= Tremont Theatre, Boston (1889) =

Coordinates: 42°21′11.29″N 71°3′51.6″W

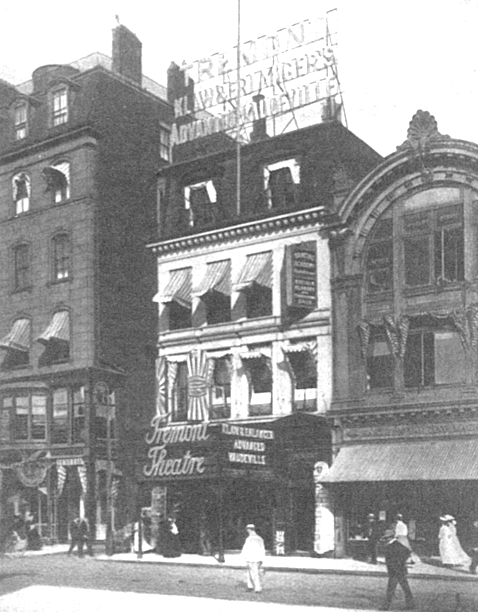
Tremont Theatre, Boston, c. 1910s

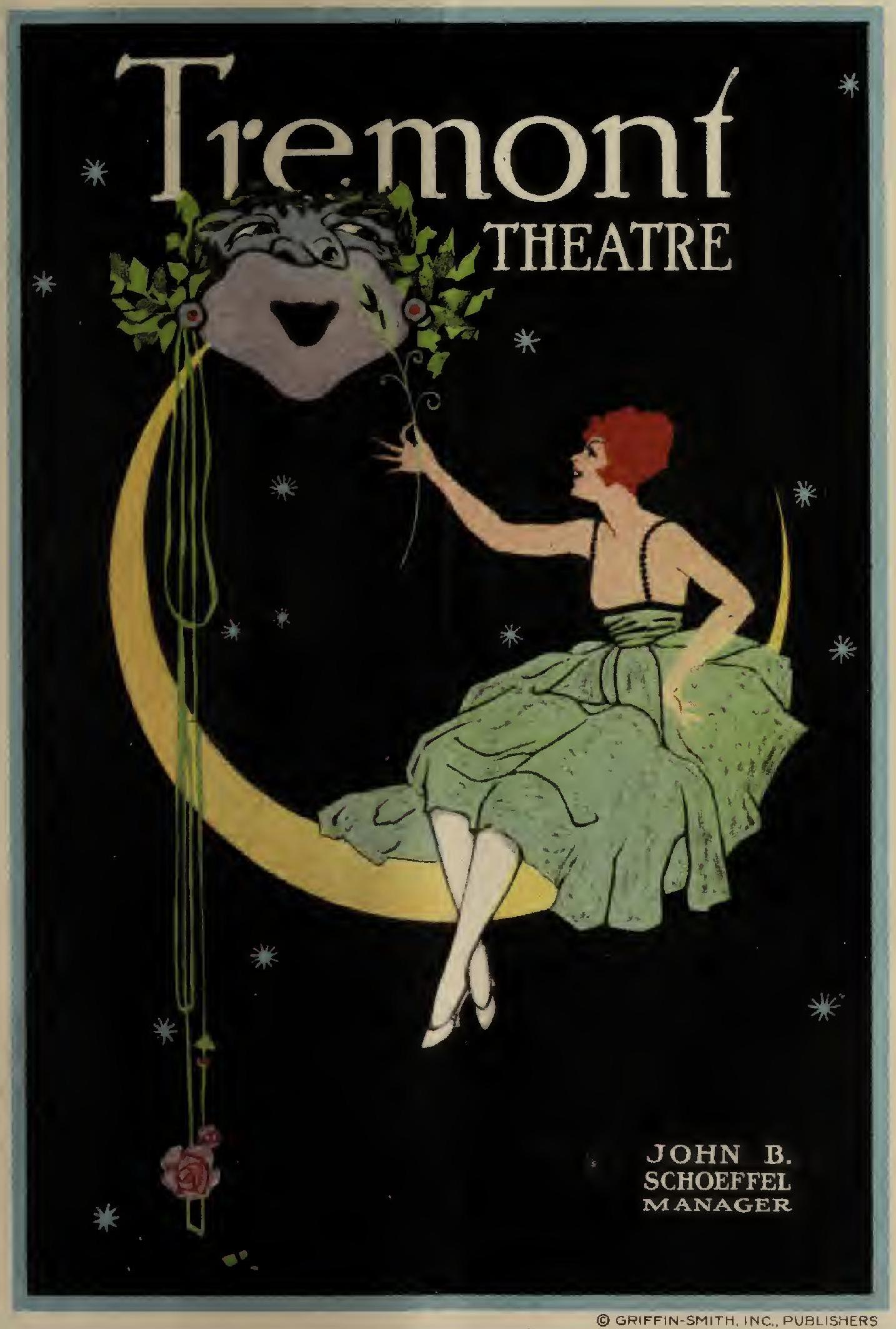
1918 cover art from Tremont Theatre

The Tremont Theatre (est. 1889) was a playhouse in Boston, Massachusetts, in the late 19th and early 20th centuries. Henry E. Abbey and John B. Schoeffel established the enterprise and oversaw construction of its building at no.176 Tremont Street in the Boston Theater District area. Managers included Abbey, Schoeffel and Grau, Klaw & Erlanger, Thos. B. Lothan and Albert M. Sheehan.

A traveller's guidebook described the space in 1899: "The auditorium is 75 feet high of the same width and 80 feet deep. It is fashioned on the plan of a mammoth shell. ... The ten oddly fashioned private boxes on either side of the proscenium give a novel effect to the interior. The decoration of the main ceiling is modernized Renaissance treated in Gobelin tapestry effect and the coloring of the walls is in harmonizing shades. The stage is 73 by 45 feet, with a height of 69 feet to the rigging loft. The house has 2,000 seats."

"In 1947 the Tremont became a movie theater named the Astor and briefly, before its demise, a juice bar." "After a fire in 1983, the building was demolished." "AMC Boston Common 19 Movie Theater now occupies the site."

== Performances ==
=== 1880s–1890s ===
- Justin McCarthy's "The Candidate," with Charles Wyndham and Mary Moore
- Sarah Bernhardt
- 1492 Up to Date, presented by Edward E. Rice's "Surprise party"
- Pauline Hall's "Puritania," music by Edgar Stillman Kelley
- "Niobe," with Abbott & Teal's comedy co.
- Garrett P. Serviss' "Wonders of America"
- W.S. Gilbert's "His Excellency," with George Edwardes' Comic Opera Co.
- "Two Little Vagrants"
- J.M. Barrie's "The Professors Love Story," with E.S. Willard
- "Half a King," with Francis Wilson
- Augustus Thomas' "The Hoosier Doctor," with Digby Bell
- Augustus Thomas' "The Jucklins," with Stuart Robson
- DeWolf Hopper and the Boston Cadet Band
- De Koven and Smith's "The Highwayman," with Broadway Theatre Opera Co.

=== 1900s ===
- Pixley & Luders' "Prince of Pilsen"
- Winston Churchill's "The Crisis," with James K. Hackett
- Roland MacDonald's "The Sword of the King," with Henrietta Crosman
- David Belasco & John Luther Long's "Darling of the Gods," with Blanche Bates
- "Mr. Pickwick," with DeWolf Hopper
- The Cingalee, with Augustin Daily Musical Co.
- Jesse Lynch Williams' "The Stolen Story"
- De Koven's "The Student King"
- Geo. Broadhurst's "Man of the Hour"
- Kitty Grey
- "A Knight for a Day"

=== 1910s ===
- Ziegfeld Follies
- Cohan's "7 Keys to Baldpate"
- D.W. Griffith's The Birth of a Nation
- Harry James Smith's "A Tailor-Made Man," with Grant Mitchell
- "Three Faces East"
- Winchell Smith and John E. Hazzards's "Turn to the Right" with Edgar Nelson and Jason Robards, September 17, 1917

=== 1920s ===
- Ed Wynn Carnival
- Little Nellie Kelly
- The O'Brien Girl
- "Just A Minute" Phil Morris and H.C Greene -"11 scenes and 90 people"
- Avery Hopwood's "The Gold Diggers"
- "Shavings," with Harry Beresford
- "Captain Applejack," with Wallace Eddinger and Mary Nash
- "The Girl in the Spotlight"

=== 1930s-1940s ===
- Green Grow the Lilacs
- "Confidential Service"
- "Divorce Me, Dear"

== Images ==
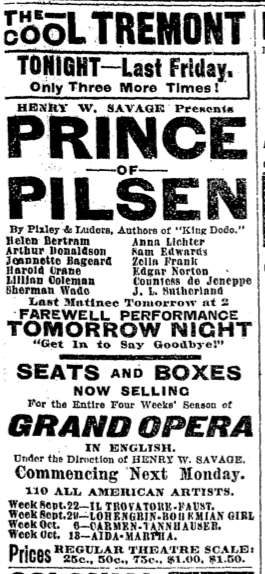
Advertisement for "the cool Tremont," 1902

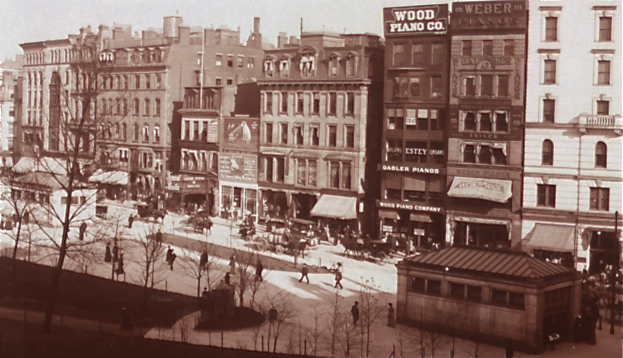
Tremont Street, 1903, across from Boston Common. (Tremont Theatre 6th building from right)

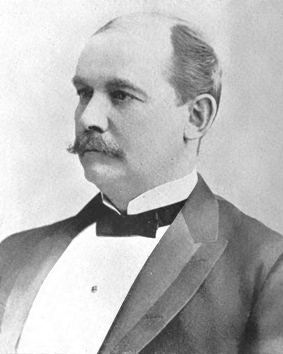
Portrait of John B. Schoeffel, one of the proprietors

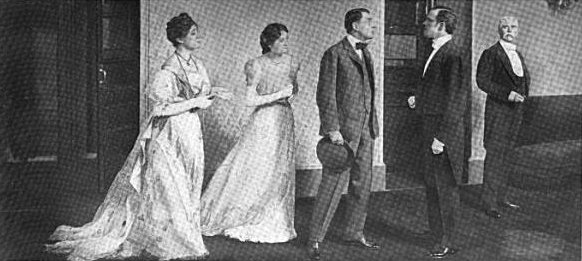
Performance of "The Stolen Story" at the Tremont Theatre, c. 1906

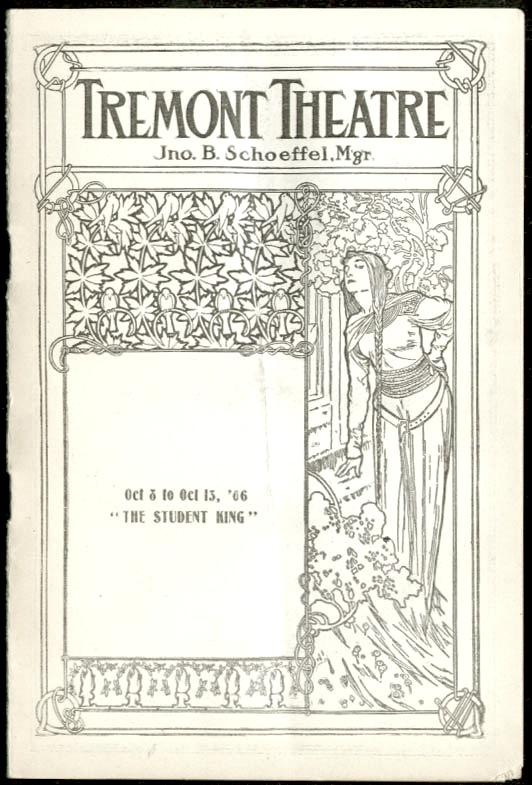
Programme from "The Student King," 1906

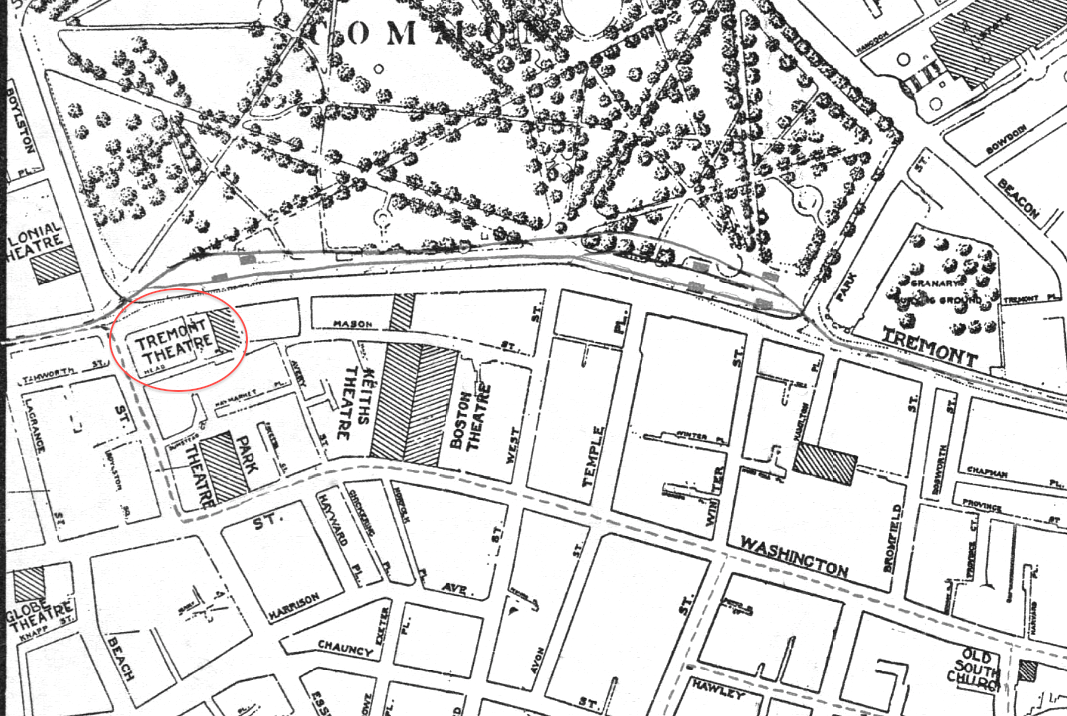
Detail of 1911 map of Boston, showing Tremont Theatre
