= Park Theatre (Boston) =

Coordinates: 42°21′9.86″N 71°3′45.35″W

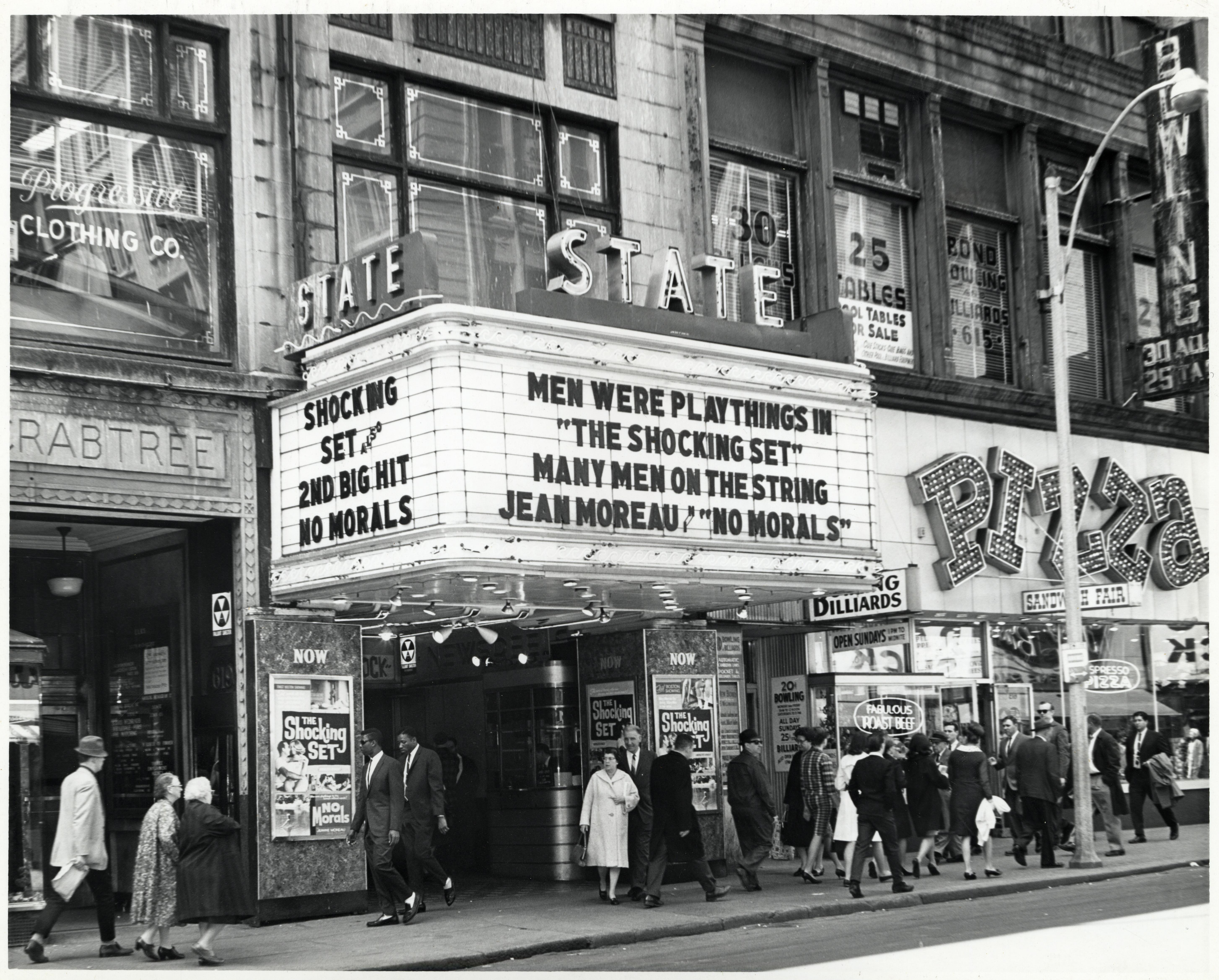
Image of the Park Theatre (Boston)

The Park Theatre (est.1879) was a playhouse in Boston, Massachusetts, in the late 19th and early 20th centuries. It later became the State cinema. Located on Washington Street, near Boylston Street, the building existed until 1990.

== History ==
In 1879 Henry E. Abbey, proprietor of Abbey's Park Theatre in New York, opened Boston's Park Theatre. Abbey was one half of the theatrical management firm Abbey and Schoeffel, along with his backer John B. Schoeffel. Schoeffel was assistant manager.

It occupied the building of the former Beethoven Hall, "reconstructed and practically rebuilt;" its 1,184-seat auditorium was "60 feet wide, 63 from the state to the doors, and 50 feet high." The architect of the rebuilt theatre was Abel C. Martin. It sat on Washington Street at the corner of Boylston Street in today's Chinatown/Theatre district.

In the 1890s it presented "farcical comedy." Managers and proprietors included Henry E. Abbey; Jack A. Crabtree; Lotta Crabtree; Charles Frohman, Rich & Harris; Lawrence McCarty; John B. Schoeffel (Abbey, Schoeffel and Grau); John Stetson Jr.; and Eugene Tompkins.

Louis Baer led the 11-piece orchestra in the 1890s.

In the 20th century the building became "Minsky's Park Burlesque," the "Hub," "Trans-Lux," and then "The State" cinema. The building survived until its razing in 1990.

== Images ==
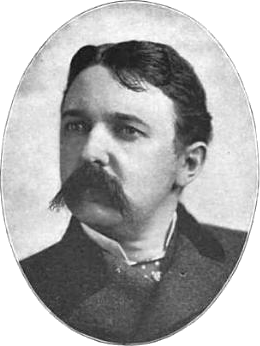
Theatre manager Henry E. Abbey, 19th century

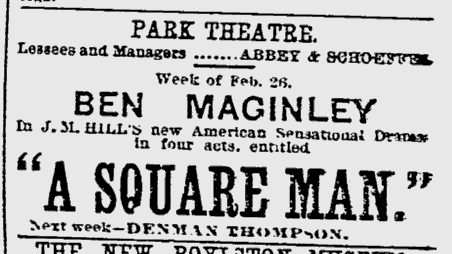
Advertisement, 1883

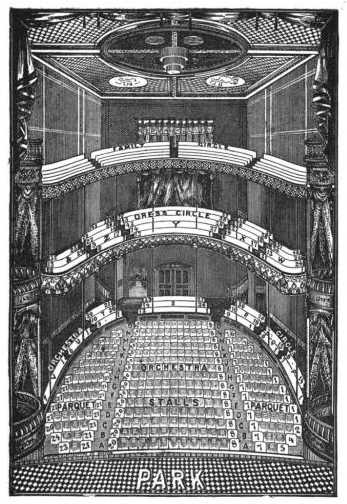
Interior, 1883

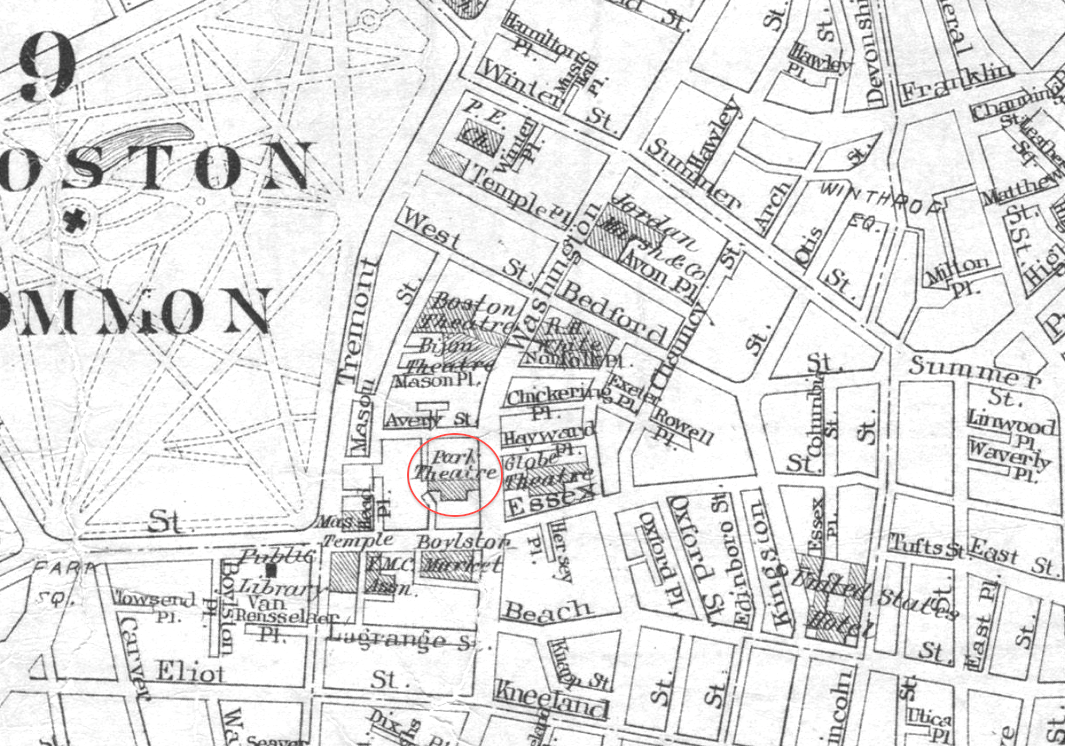
Detail of map of Boston, showing Park Theatre, 1886

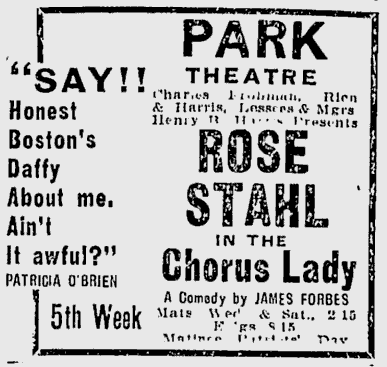
Advertisement, 1908

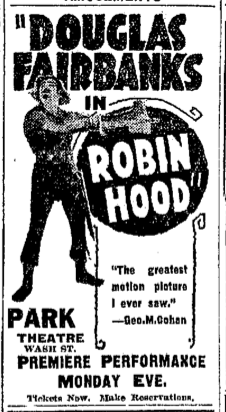
Advertisement for Robin Hood film at the Park Theatre, Boston, 1922

== Performances ==
=== 1870s–1880s ===
- Fedora, with Fanny Davenport and Robert Mantell
- Gunter's Prince Karl
- Andrea
- Gretchen
- Fun in a Photograph Gallery

=== 1890s ===
- James A. Herne's Sag Harbor
- Merchant of Venice, with Sidney Woollett
- 1492
- C.A. Byrne and Louis Harrison's Venus
- Trilby
- Lost, Strayed or Stolen
- Dumas Clemenceau Case.

=== 1900s ===
- Choir Invisible
- Henry Arthur Jones' The Hypocrites
- R.A. Barnet's Cap of Fortune and the Show Girl
- Fay Davis Whitewashing Julia

=== 1910s ===
- The Dancing Girl
- The Girl of the Golden West
- Maternity, starring Alice Brady
- The Soul of a Magdalen, starring Olga Petrova

=== 1920s ===
- On with the Dance
- Robin Hood
