= Abbey's Park Theatre =

Former theatre in Manhattan, New York

Coordinates: 40.740°N 73.992°W

Abbey's Park Theatre or Abbey's New Park Theatre was a playhouse at 932 Broadway and 22nd Street in what is now the Flatiron District of Manhattan in New York City. It opened as the New Park Theatre in 1874, and was in use until 1882 when it burned down and was never rebuilt as a theatre.

== Description ==
The theatre stood on a plot of land 60 x 100 feet (20 x 30 meters). The façade was "plain and substantial, rather than ornamental." It was made of Philadelphia brick with trimmings of Nova Scotia stone.

The auditorium was 60 x 60 feet (20 x 20 m) with a parquet or orchestra circle, dress circle, and gallery. There were 12 proscenium boxes, six on each side of the stage. The stage was 34 x 60 feet and 52 feet to the girders. The proscenium was 26 feet wide and 24 feet to the top of the arch. The cost of the building (exclusive of the plot of land upon which it stood) was expected to be $100,000.

The color scheme in the auditorium was French gray, and gold, with lines of red for relief.

== History ==
=== Construction ===
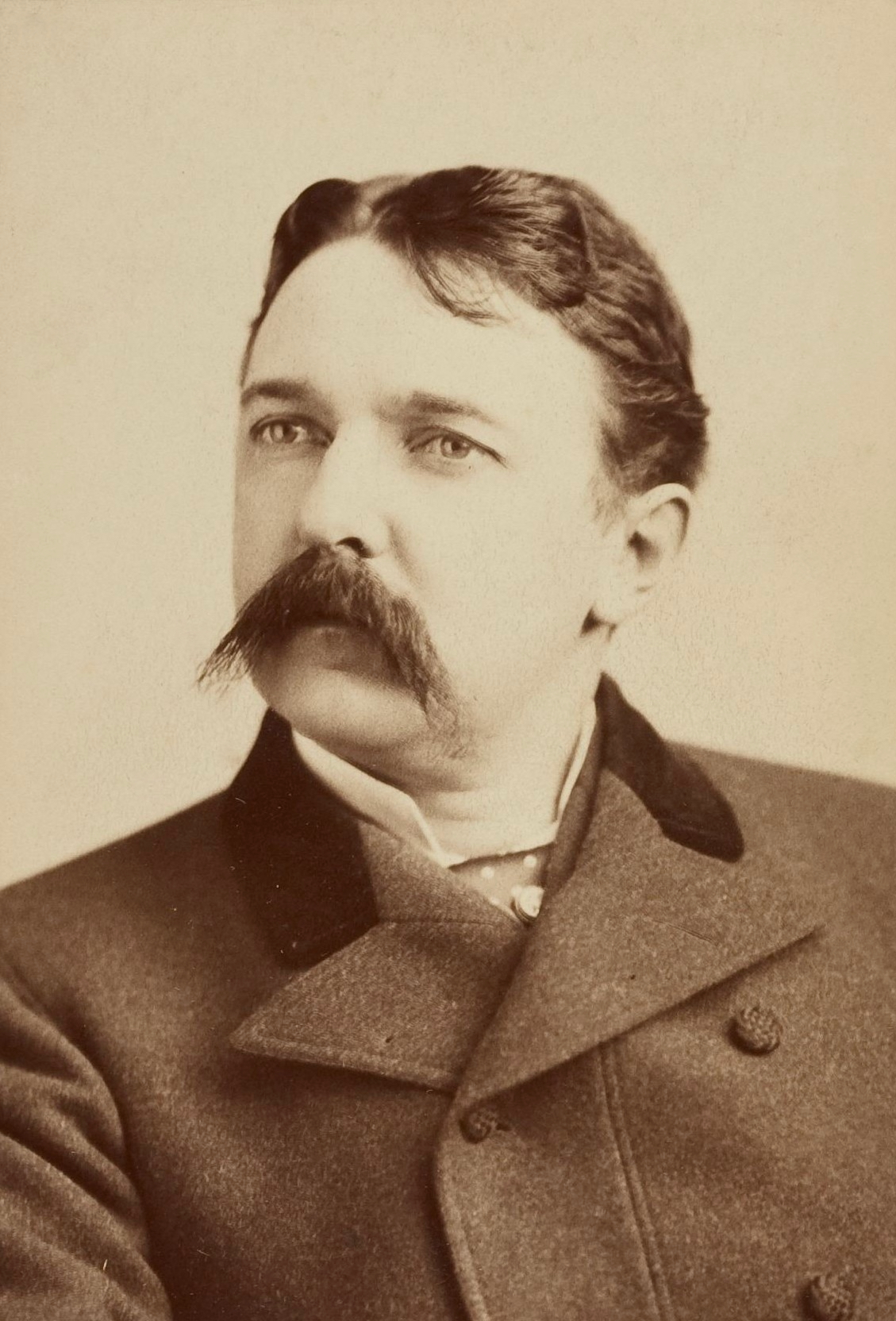
Henry E. Abbey in c. 1896

The New Park Theatre, designed by Frederic Draper, was built on the site of a previous theatre from May 1873 – March 1874 by Dion Boucicault and William Stuart at a cost of $100,000. They had previously been involved with the Winter Garden Theatre, which Boucicault left in 1860 and was destroyed in March 1867 in a fire which almost cost Stuart his life.

An advance description of the New Park appeared in the New York Times on May 31, 1872. In July 1872 Draper, the architect, put forward an enlarged design. This included buying an adjacent plot of land, whose rightful ownership was mired in litigation. The theatre was meant to open in October 1873 but a deadlock in litigation dragged on for so long that Boucicault and Stuart cancelled the opening. In the end another suitable plot came up for sale, and work progressed. The available artistes were re-engaged. By the end of March 1874 the work was nearly complete.

=== Opening ===
Boucicault had been announced to be interested in the management, but withdrew just before the theatre opened: and Stuart teamed up instead with the actor, playwright and theatre manager Charles Fechter to run the house. The New Park Theatre opened on April 13 or April 15, 1874 with William Stuart as manager, and Fechter appearing in his own play Love's Penance, an adaptation of Le médecin des enfants by Count d'Avrigny. Edwin Booth, who had been with Stuart at the Winter Garden, was fairly scathing about the whole enterprise:

"I should like to hear of Stuart's success – but I doubt it, for I fear Fechter is unlucky, & Stuart really possesses very little, if any theatrical business capacity. F's remarkable talents both as actor and as stage manager shd. ensure the success of any theatre – could he be managed; otherwise I doubts the safety of any enterprise he has to do with."

Love's Penance closed on May 6, 1874, and shortly after Fechter withdrew from the management and retired. Stuart suffered financial embarrassments, and the theatre may have been shut down by the Sheriff on more than one occasion. The house remained closed until the fall of 1874, when John T. Raymond performed Mark Twain's Colonel Sellers for 100 nights. This was followed by the Grau-Chizzola company in Charles Lecocq's Giroflé-Girofla, and George Fawcett Rowe appeared in his own play Brass.

The following season Stuart presented Mr. & Mrs. William J. Florence in Benjamin E. Woolf's The Mighty Dollar which reached its 100th performance on December 13, 1875. Gold medals were struck for the occasion, but the calamitous failure of Oakey Hall (former Mayor of New York 1869–1872) in his own play The Crucible, and an unprofitable production of F. Marsden's The Clouds early in the winter season of 1876 left him unable to carry on, and Stuart swiftly relinquished control of his theatre.

=== Henry E. Abbey ===
In November 1876 Henry E. Abbey took over the management of the house and renamed the New Park Theatre to Abbey's Park Theatre. Abbey was associated with John B. Schoeffel, and later with Maurice Grau in the theatrical management partnership of Abbey, Schoeffel and Grau.

The shows were light comedies and farces; and the theatre saw the beginning of the combination of Stuart Robson and W. H. Crane. Acts like Helena Modjeska, and Thomas W. Keene in Shakespeare (especially Richard III) performed there.

Abbey put on popular successes like Our Boarding House, set in Chicago, by Leonard Grover, starring Stuart Robson, W. H. Crane and William E. Sheridan. It opened on January 29, 1877 and played for 104 performances, running for at least eight weeks to March 1877. Among Abbey's many artistes one of the biggest names was Lotta, a light-comedy star. She was one of the highest-paid actress in America, earning sums of up to $5,000 per week.

Boucicault's Dot, a dramatisation of Charles Dickens's The Cricket on the Hearth with John E. Owens played at the Park Theatre from January 20, 1879. Divorçons by Victorien Sardou opened at Abbey's New Park Theatre on April 1, 1882.

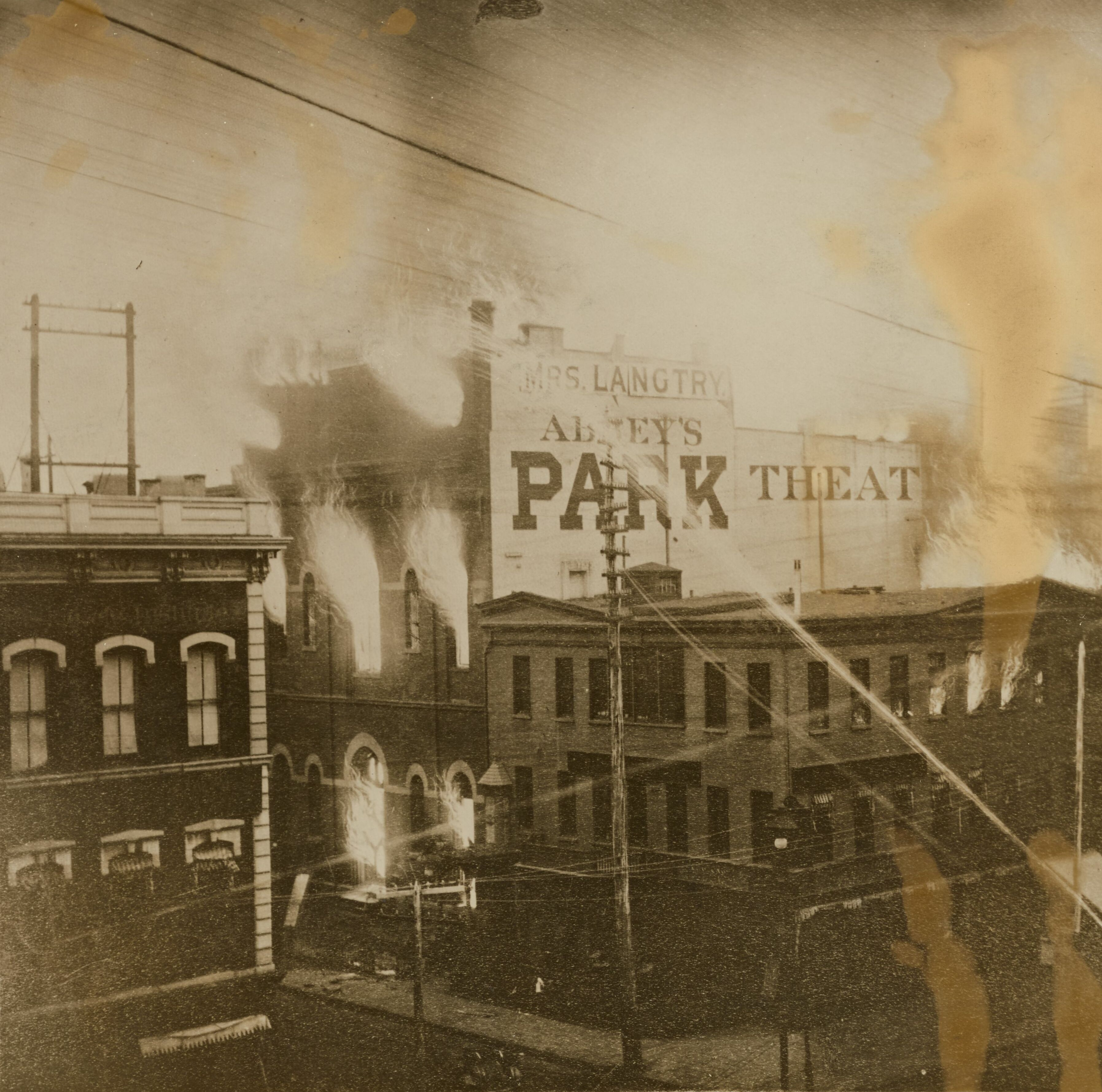
The burning of Abbey's Park Theatre in New York on October 30, 1882.

=== Destruction ===
On one of his trips to Europe looking for new stars, Abbey saw Lilly Langtry perform in Edinburgh, and offered her a season in America. Langtry's tour of the US was due to open at the Park Theatre on October 30, 1882, but during the day the building was completely demolished by fire and was never rebuilt.

The next day the papers implicated Langtry in the misfortune. They declared that the burning of the Park Theatre was the biggest and costliest advertisement ever designed to welcome a star to America's shores. Langtry presented Tom Taylor's An Unequal Match a week later to capacity houses at Wallack's Theatre instead.

== Aftermath ==
With Abbey's theatre—and one main source of income—gone, he and Schoeffel invited Maurice Grau to join them in partnership. The theatrical management firm of Abbey, Schoeffel and Grau went on to lease and manage the brand-new Metropolitan Opera House (the 'Old Met') for its opening season of 1883–4. It was a critical success but a financial disaster: Abbey as manager was personally responsible for losses of $250,000.

== Similarly named theaters ==
Soon after Abbey's Park Theatre burned down in October 1882, another New Park Theatre opened at 1331 Broadway in 1883. It was leased by David Belasco, who survived the 1883-1884 season with a new version of his The Stranglers of Paris, adapted from a story by Adolphe Belot. It played at his New Park Theatre on November 12, 1883. Belasco's adaptation of Uncle Tom's Cabin (a 'Tom show') probably also played there. The New Park Theatre was renamed as the Herald Square Theatre in 1894.
