= Edmund O'Flaherty =

Irish-American politician and businessman

Edmund O'Flaherty (1821– New York, 27 December 1886), also known as William Stuart, was an Irish MP who hurriedly emigrated to the United States in 1854. In New York City, he was the business partner of the actor-managers Dion Boucicault and Edwin Booth. He leased and managed the Winter Garden Theatre with them. He also managed the New Park Theatre on Broadway from 1874 to 1876.

== Biography ==
=== Early life ===
A native of Knockbane, Moycullen, County Galway, he was educated at Eton when Cardinal Wiseman was headmaster.

O'Flaherty became the private secretary to the Duke of Newcastle, who wanted to ally with the Peelite party and that of the Irish MPs. O'Flaherty's ability was recognised by the Duke, who employed him as an emissary to Ireland and gave him a Commissionership of Income Tax in Galway.

He was active in Irish politics in the middle years of the 19th century. Described as "a man of great warmth, cleverness and inexhaustible resource", he was a friend of William Keogh and John Sadleir.

In 1854, he disappeared from London and rumours were current throughout the city that warrants were out against him for forgery. Persons concerned included Lord Bolingbroke, Lord Dunkellin, Bernal Osborne and Sir William Gregory, the late Governor of Ceylon.

=== 'William Stuart' ===
O'Flaherty escaped via Denmark (which had no extradition treaty with Britain) to the U.S. under the alias of 'Captain William Stuart'. To earn a living he began by writing for the papers, made some money, and formed a partnership with the actor Dion Boucicault, another expatriate Irishman. Together they leased Wallack's Theatre in 1855-1856 and put on a short season at the Washington Theatre in Washington D.C.

After this, they took over the Winter Garden Theatre, where Stuart was joint lessee and manager. It opened in September 1859 with John Jefferson in Boucicault's Dot, an adaptation of Charles Dickens's The Cricket on the Hearth. Boucicault's The Octoroon opened on 8 8 December 1859, but arguments over money and ownership of the play led to Boucicault and his wife Agnes leaving for Laura Keene's Theatre at 622-624 Broadway, and then for England. Stuart remained at the Winter Garden.

He was still heavily involved in recruiting American help for a free Ireland, as a letter dated 5 October 1861 from New York to John O'Mahony, later founder of the Fenian Brotherhood makes clear:

"I would remind [the expectants] that another famine ever imperils Ireland, the result of a wet summer and harvest. If matters go on thus much longer there will be no Irish Nation for us to free. If we are to redeem our country, we must do it soon, or not at all [...]

"I now leave our cause in the hands of her patriot sons in America [...] I trust the 'Centres' throughout the States will rally round you. If they work they will get all the power required and Ireland must be free. If they fail in their duty, to God and their Country, then is Ireland doomed—doomed to become an integral part of the British Empire as Scotland, once Celtic and now Saxon—more Saxon than England herself. [I pray] that Heaven will send us labourers for the work.

Edwin Booth joined Stuart as co-lessee in the management of the Winter Garden On 21 February 1863. On November 26, 1864, Booth played the lead role in the first of what became known as the “100 nights Hamlet", a record which stood for fifty-six years.

The Winter Garden Theatre burned down on 23 March 1867. Stuart at the time of the discovery was in his sleeping apartment in the theatre, only partially dressed, and was compelled to leave his watch and pocket-book on the table when he made his hurried exit. Stuart, who was wholly uninsured, barely escaped with his life. A performance of The Black Crook on 27 March 1867 at Niblo's Garden was given as a benefit for him.

Stuart turned to writing for the New York Herald for some time, and again in partnership with Boucicault, he built the New Park Theatre in 1873–1874. However, Boucicault withdrew just before the theatre opened, and Stuart teamed up instead with actor, playwright and theatre manager Charles Fechter as stage manager.

The New Park Theatre opened on 13 April or 15 April 1874 with Stuart as manager, and Fechter appearing in his own play Love's Penance, an adaptation of Le médecin des enfants by Count d'Avrigny. Edwin Booth, who had been with Stuart at the Winter Garden, was fairly scathing about the whole enterprise:

"I should like to hear of Stuart's success - but I doubt it, for I fear Fechter is unlucky, & Stuart really possesses very little, if any theatrical business capacity. F's remarkable talents both as actor and as stage manager shd. ensure the success of any theatre - could he be managed; otherwise I doubt the safety of any enterprise he has to do with."

Love's Penance closed on 6 May 1874, and shortly after Fechter withdrew from the management and retired. Stuart continued to run the New Park Theatre until the fall of 1876 when he sold it to Henry E. Abbey.

=== Retirement and death ===
O'Flaherty/Stuart had become successful and again famous for his hospitality and parties. It was well known that there was something against him, but it was presumed that he left England unable to pay his debts. Englishmen of great position, on their return from America, told how they had been entertained by the pleasantest and wittiest of Irishmen, Captain Stuart. He spent the large income he was making, fell into poverty, and died in New York on 27 December 1886.

Justin Huntly McCarthy, M.P., wrote of him:

[John Sadleir's] lieutenants were his brother, James Sadleir, Mr. William Keogh, and Mr. Edmund O'Flaherty: these men were all adventurers, and most of them swindlers. O'Flaherty became Commissioner of Income Tax. Then they broke up. John Sadleir had embezzled, swindled, forged; he ruined half Ireland with his fraudulent bank; he made use of his position under Government to embezzle public money. O’Flaherty hurried to Denmark, where there was no extradition treaty, and then to New York, where he lived under another name, a familiar figure in certain circles of New York society, famous as a diner-out, as a good story-teller, and a humourist—a sort of combination of Brillat-Savarin and the later Richelieu, with a dash of Gines de Pasamonte.

== See also ==
- Muintir Murchada
- Iar Connacht
- Murchadh an Chapail Ua Flaithbheartaigh, King of Maigh Seóla/Iar Connacht, died 1036.
- O'Flaherty
