= Academy of Music (Buffalo, New York) =

Former theatre in the United States

Coordinates: 42.8806°N 78.8758°W

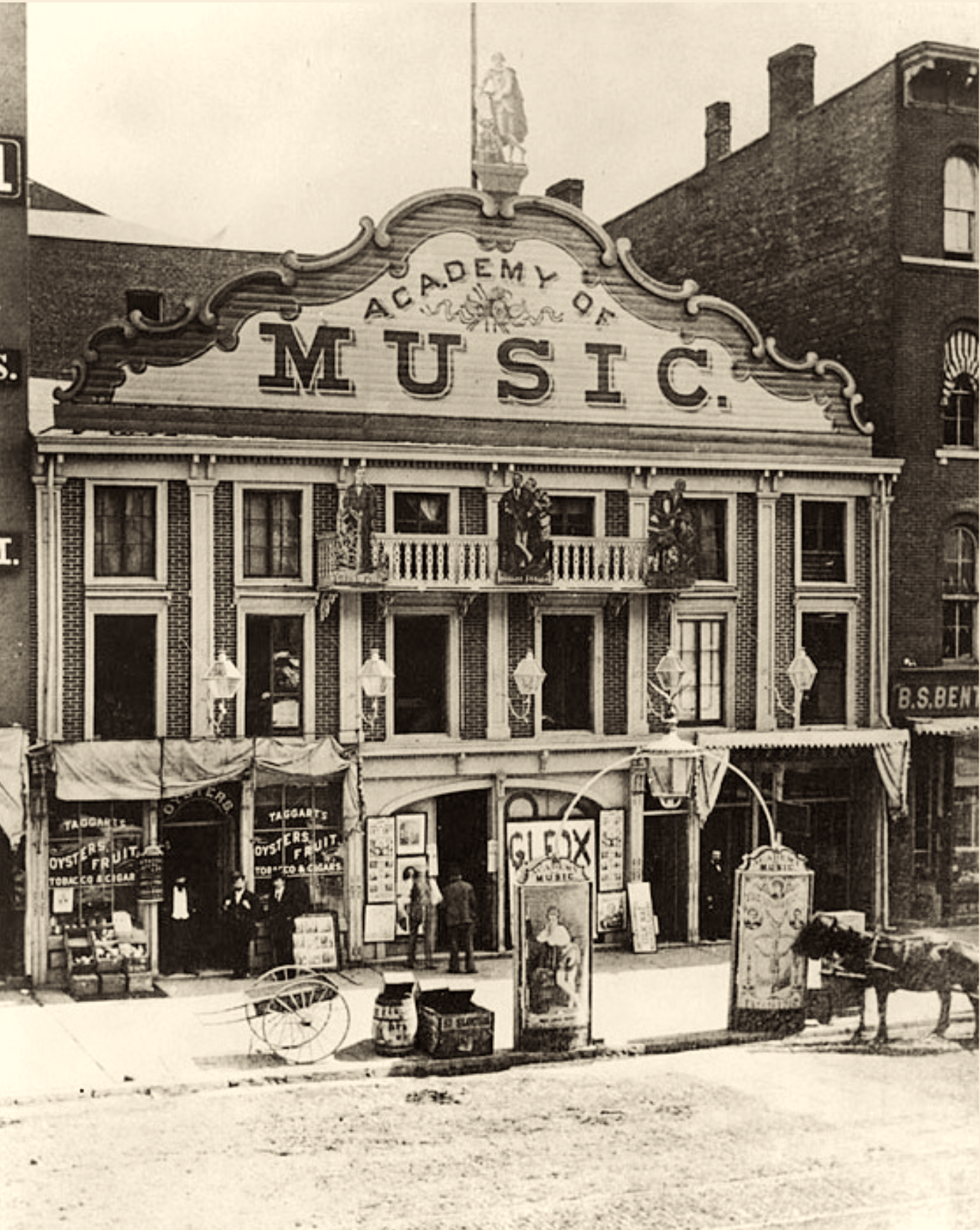
1868 photograph of the Academy of Music in Buffalo.

The Academy of Music was a theatre in Buffalo, New York located near the corner of Main Street and Seneca Street. Originally called the Metropolitan Theatre, the performance venue was built and opened in 1852. Its name was changed to the Academy of Music in 1868. The theatre was demolished in 1955.

== History ==
New York theatre impresario Henry T. Meech built the Metropolitan Theatre in 1852. The theatre's inauguration took place on October 15, 1852; an event which began with an opening address written by the writer Anson G. Chester (1827–1911) and read by the actress Anna Cora Mowatt. The grand opening also featured Mowatt in a production of John Tobin's The Honey Moon. The theatre was initially leased to C. T. Smith during its first season. Smith joined with Thomas Carr and Henry Warren to co-manage the theatre during its second year. The firm of Carr, Warren, & Smith also managed a theatre in Rochester, New York, and Smith left Buffalo to look after the firm's interests in Rochester. Carr & Warren co-managed the theatre for approximately three seasons, before Carr bought his partners out and continued to manage theatre on his own for a brief period.

In 1857 Carr left the Metropolitan Theatre after failing to make it financially profitable, and Henry Meech took over the management of the theatre for a short period. The theatre then came under the management of Olney & Whitman, but they too failed to make the theatre profitable. Meech took back control of the theatre and continued to manage it until 1865 when he relinquished control of the theatre to his son, John H. Meech. In 1868 the theatre was re-named the Academy of Music after undergoing extensive remodeling. It was given a grand re-opening under that name on July 28, 1868.

Henry Meech died on December 6, 1870, after which John H. Meech was joined by his brother, Henry L. Meech, in the management of the theatre. In 1875-1876 the Meech brothers leased the theatre to Henry E. Abbey and John B. Schoeffel. In 1882 the theatre was renovated once again, and its main entrance was moved from Seneca Street to Main Street. The newly renovated theatre re-opened on September 4, 1882 with a production of Bob starring Lotta Crabtree.

The Academy of Music was demolished in 1955.
