= Abbey, Schoeffel and Grau =

American theatre management and production firm

Abbey, Schoeffel and Grau, originally Abbey and Schoeffel, was an American theatre management and production firm. The firm was established in 1876 when a partnership was formed between Henry Abbey and John Schoeffel. Fellow theatre manager and producer Maurice Grau began collaborating with the pair as early as 1880, but did not formally join the firm until 1887 when it became Abbey, Schoeffel and Grau. They managed and ran a number of theatres in New York and Boston, including the Metropolitan Opera House ("the old Met"). Abbey was the sole manager and lessee of the Metropolitan Opera during its first season in 1883-1884 with Schoeffel uninvolved with the Met at this time. Grau was hired by Abbey to serve as the Met's unofficial business manager during its first season but did not have a formal title on the Met's staff. Later, Abbey, Schoeffel and Grau were the official co-managers of the Met from 1891 until 1896 when Abbey died. The firm dissolved at the conclusion of the Met's 1896-1897 season, and Grau became the sole manager of the Metropolitan Opera from 1896-1903.

Abbey, Schoeffel and Grau
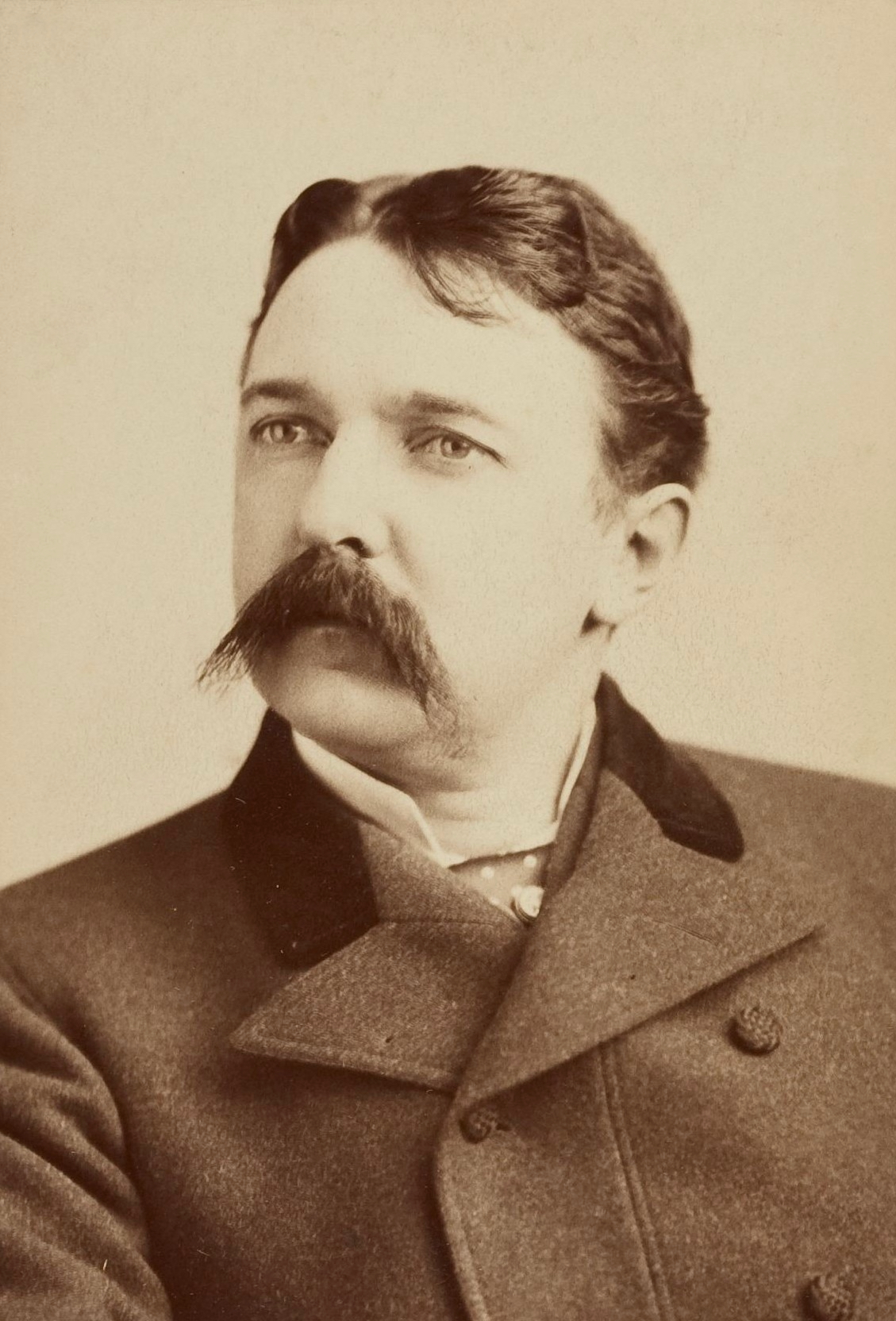
Henry E. Abbey
(1846–1896)

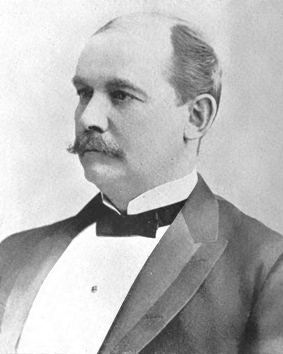
John B. Schoeffel
(1846–1918)

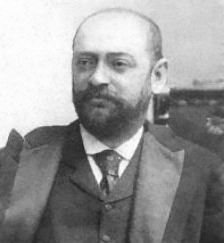
Maurice Grau
(1849–1907)

== Abbey and Schoeffel ==
=== Establishing the firm ===
The firm of Abbey and Schoeffel was established in 1876 when theatre managers and producers Henry Abbey and John Schoeffel formed a partnership. Abbey was responsible for the artiste management and Schoeffel looking after the business side. They began by hiring the Academy of Music, Buffalo, NY (1852–1956) in 1876–7 with Lotta, and later at Abbey's Park Theatre from 1876 to 1882 (when it burned down). In Boston they rebuilt the Beethoven Hall as the Park Theatre in 1879. They took the lease of Booth's Theatre, New York City, from Dion Boucicault on 1 January 1880 until 1 May 1881. They engaged Helena Modjeska] at Booth's Theatre in 1880 and 1881, and secured the lease of the Grand Opera House (formerly Pike's Opera House) in 1882. The duo managed Christina Nilsson, Henry Irving and Lillie Langtry on tours of the US; the latter's début was delayed when Abbey's New Park Theatre burned down on October 30, 1882.

=== Early collaboration with Grau and the Met's first season ===
Abbey and Schoeffel first collaborated with Maurice Grau in 1880 when they co-organized Sarah Bernhardt's first tour of the United States; a highly profitable venture which earned them both money and artistic acclaim. At that time, Grau was already a prominent theatre manager and producer not only in New York but on the national stage who had played an instrumental role in popularizing French opera bouffa and more generally the musical among American audiences during the 1870s. He had been managing and producing light opera companies since 1872 and brought numerous European artists to the United States, including Jacques Offenbach. He branched out into grand opera with the Maurice Grau Opera Company, which in 1881 had given a five-week season at the Teatro Solis in Montevideo, Uruguay. With a Brazilian conductor named Gravenstein they presented a mix of grand opera and operettas: La traviata in French, Carmen, Donizetti's La fille du régiment, Thomas' Mignon, Victor Massé's Paul et Virginie, Offenbach's La Périchole and Lecocq's Giroflé-Girofla.

Following the success of Bernhardt's tour, Abbey enlisted Grau to be his business manager at the newly created Metropolitan Opera in 1883. Schoeffel was not involved with this project, and Abbey was the sole lessee and manager of the Met during its first season. Grau, while doing the work of the Met's business manager, did not have an official position on the Met's managerial staff at this time. The 1883-4 opening season of the 'old' New York Metropolitan Opera House, was a critical success but a financial failure. Abbey as manager was personally responsible for losses of $250,000. The London-based banker Henry F. Gillig lost $200,000 in the Met debut.

=== Other work ===
Abbey and Schoeffel returned to light opera and touring European acts including Henry Irving and Ellen Terry from 1884.

== Abbey, Schoeffel, and Grau ==
Maurice Grau joined with Abbey and Schoeffel to form the firm of Abbey, Schoeffel and Grau in 1887 immediately following another successful collaboration between the three men in which they organized and managed another tour featuring the French actress Sarah Bernhardt. From 1887 to 1888 they leased the Star Theatre (844 Broadway at 13th Street, previously Wallack's Theatre), and also from 11 October 1887 to July 1888 the then current Wallack's Theatre on 30th Street and Broadway. They built the Tremont Theatre, Boston in 1888, managed by Schoeffel.

Abbey, Schoeffel and Grau again took up the challenge of grand opera, with a short season with Adelina Patti in 1887 at the Met, and in 1888 at the Teatro Solis, Montevideo; this was followed by a season of grand opera at the Auditorium Theatre in Chicago in 1889, and tours of the US with Patti, Nordica, and Albani in 1890. They built the Broadway playhouse Abbey's Theatre (at 1396 Broadway and West 38th Street) in 1893.

In 1891 Abbey, Schoeffel and Grau became co-managers of the Metropolitan Opera; succeeding Edmund C. Stanton whose focus on German opera had fallen out of favor. This co-leadership continued until the death of Abbey on October 17, 1896. At the time of his death the firm was in a poor state of affairs, largely due to Abbey's mismanagement which cost him all his fortune and deprived Mr. Grau as well of his savings.

By 1895 the firm of Abbey, Schoeffel and Grau was in severe financial difficulties, and asked for extension of time to meet their obligations. The indebtedness was completely paid off. However, on 22 May 1896 the company failed with unsecured liabilities of $369,419.36 and actual assets of $162,54.85. Abbey had been ill. On June 30 the directors of the Metropolitan Opera and Real Estate Company renewed their lease and continued with their contract to produce grand opera. The creditors received 40% preferred stock and 60% in notes of the firm of Abbey, Schoeffel and Grau, which had been newly incorporated in July 1896 with $500,000 capital, of which $200,000 was preferred stock. The new organisation started free from debt, but Abbey died in October 1896.

The firm of Abbey, Schoeffel and Grau did not survive after the death of Abbey. It dissolved after the conclusion of the Met's 1896-1897 season. Grau was the sole manager of the Met from 1897 until his retirement in 1903. He concurrently was director of the Royal Opera House in London from 1897-1900. He retired to Paris and died in 1907. Schoeffel continued to manage the Tremont Theatre in Boston until his death in 1918.
