= John B. Schoeffel =

American theatre manager, producer, and businessman (1846–1918)

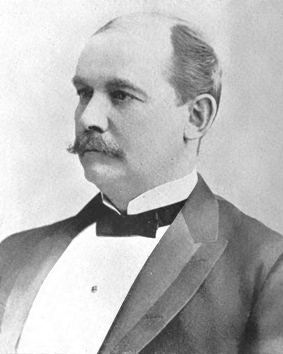
Schoeffel in 1896

John Baptist Schoeffel (May 11, 1846 – died Boston, August 31, 1918), was an American theatre manager and producer, and hotel owner.

With Henry E. Abbey he co-founded the theatre management and production firm Abbey and Schoeffel in 1876. Together, they managed the Academy of Music in Buffalo, New York, and Abbey's Park Theatre in Manhattan until both were destroyed by fire in 1882. They also presented European theatrical stars in tours of the United States, including Henry Irving and Ellen Terry.

In 1880, Schoeffel and Abbey collaborated with fellow theatre impresario Maurice Grau to manage and produce actress Sarah Bernhardt's first tour of the U.S. Grau later worked under Abbey, but without Schoeffel, as business manager of New York City's Metropolitan Opera (The Met) during its first season in 1883.

The trio re-united in 1887 to manage a second American tour by Bernhardt, and immediately following this Grau, joined Schoeffel and Abbey to form the firm Abbey, Schoeffel and Grau. From 1891 until Abbey's death in 1896, the three men co-managed The Met. Grau and Schoeffel continued on until the close of The Met's 1896–1897 season at which point the firm was dissolved. Alone, Schoeffel continued to manage the Tremont Theatre in Boston, Massachusetts, until his death in 1918.

== Career ==
John B. Schoeffel was born in Rochester, New York, on May 11, 1846. He began his career in the theatre business working as an usher at Buffalo's Hayes Opera House.

In 1876, he co-founded the theatre management and production firm of Abbey and Schoeffel with fellow impresario Henry E. Abbey. Together, they managed Buffalo's Academy of Music from 1876 until it was destroyed by fire in 1882. They also co-managed Abbey's Park Theatre in Manhattan.

Schoeffel was resident manager of Boston's Park Theatre when it was built in 1879, and manager of Boston's Tremont Theatre until his death.

Abbey and Schoeffel managed the ten-year-old pianist Josef Hofmann when he toured the U.S., but he was stopped from playing because of overwork. A letter from Schoeffel from the Tremont Theatre dates from this period.

Hofmann's agent in London was Narciso Vert, whose business became the firm of Ibbs and Tillett. He and Abbey managed opera singers, including Adelina Patti, Christina Nilsson, Ernestine Schumann-Heink, Francesco Tamagno and Fyodor Chaliapin in their tours of opera houses in Boston, Chicago and New York.

Fellow theatre manager and producer Maurice Grau began collaborating with Abbey and Schoeffel as early as 1880 when the three men co-produced and managed Bernhardt's first U.S. tour. Grau did not officially join the firm of Abbey and Schoeffel until 1887 after Bernhardt's second tour under their management which is when Abbey, Schoeffel and Grau was officially established.

When Abbey became the first managing director The Met in 1883, Schoeffel was not involved with The Met at this time. Grau was hired by Abbey to run the business affairs of The Met during its first season; although he did not have an official title or role on the staff of The Met at this point.

Later, Abbey, Schoeffel and Grau were appointed co-managers of The Met in 189, a role they maintained until Abbey's death in 1896. The firm was in a financially bad state at that time, and it was disestablished in 1897 at the conclusion of The Met's 1896–1897 season.

Schoeffel produced some plays at Daly's Theatre on Broadway in 1904 after Grau retired. One of these, Henrik Ibsen's Hedda Gabler, starred Nance O'Neill, a close friend of Lizzie Borden.

== Personal life ==
In 1885, he married the Australian actress Agnes Booth (née Marion Agnes Land Rookes) (October 4, 1841? – January 2, 1910), the widow of Junius Brutus Booth Jr. (brother of John Wilkes Booth and Edwin Booth, owner of Booth's Theatre) as her second husband.

Together, they managed the huge Masconomo hotel in Manchester-by-the-Sea, Massachusetts, until her death in 1910. He purchased the property outright at public auction in 1911, which changed hands before its complete destruction by fire in 1919.

=== Death ===
Schoeffel died at Boston's Massachusetts General Hospital on August 31, 1918, after a stroke two weeks earlier. He was buried at the Mount Hope Cemetery in Rochester.
