= Akron Opera House =

- U.S. National Register of Historic Places
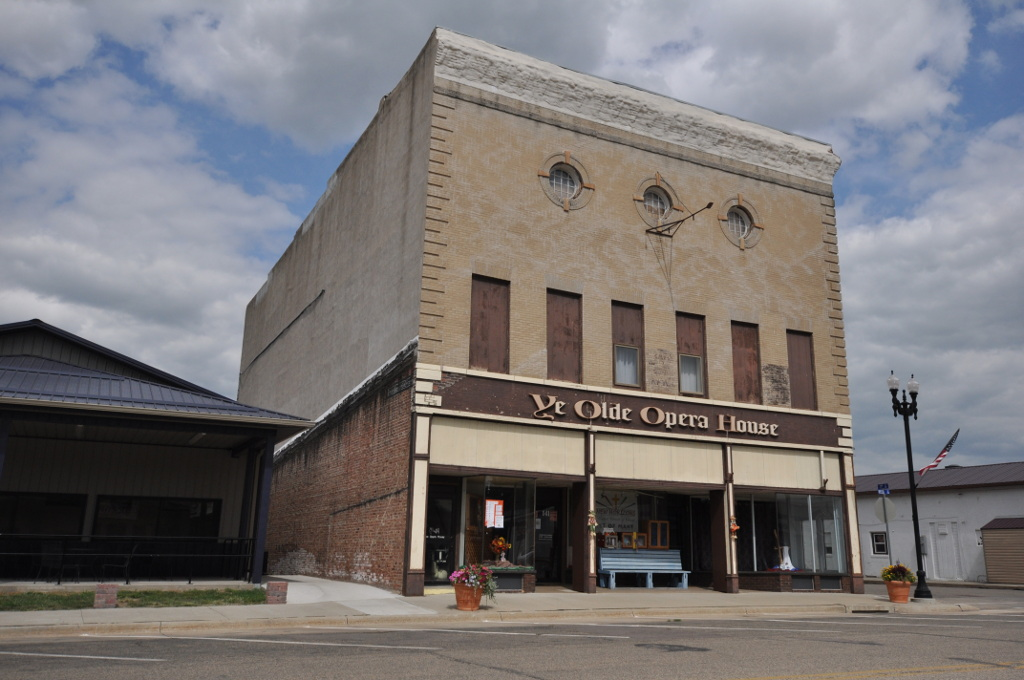

- Location within Iowa Location within the United States
- Location: 151 Reed St. Akron, Iowa
- Coordinates: 42°49′44.3″N 96°33′35.1″W
- Area: less than one acre
- Built: 1906
- Architectural style: Late 19th and 20th Century Revivals
- MPS: Footlights in Farm Country: Iowa Opera Houses MPS
- NRHP reference No.: 12000403
- Added to NRHP: July 10, 2012

Akron Opera House is a historic building located in Akron, Iowa, United States. The American Insurance Company of Des Moines promised the local citizens that if they bought enough insurance policies they would build the town an opera house. The $18,000 building was completed in 1905, with the interior completed the next year. The first floor housed commercial space, with the opera house occupying the second and third floors. The 600-seat theatre featured a stage on the north end and balcony and main floor seating. The first play was the disappointing The Homeseekers on February 15, 1906. The first opera was The Rajah of Altara on February 28, 1906. Akron was on a circuit that brought traveling companies of actors, musicians and politicians to rural communities. In addition to musical and theatrical performances, the theatre hosted lyceum speakers, medicine shows, school events, boxing matches, basketball games, dances, Chautauqua’s, political gatherings, and church activities. The building was listed on the National Register of Historic Places in 2012.
