= Maurice Grau =

Austrian-born American impresario (1849–1907)

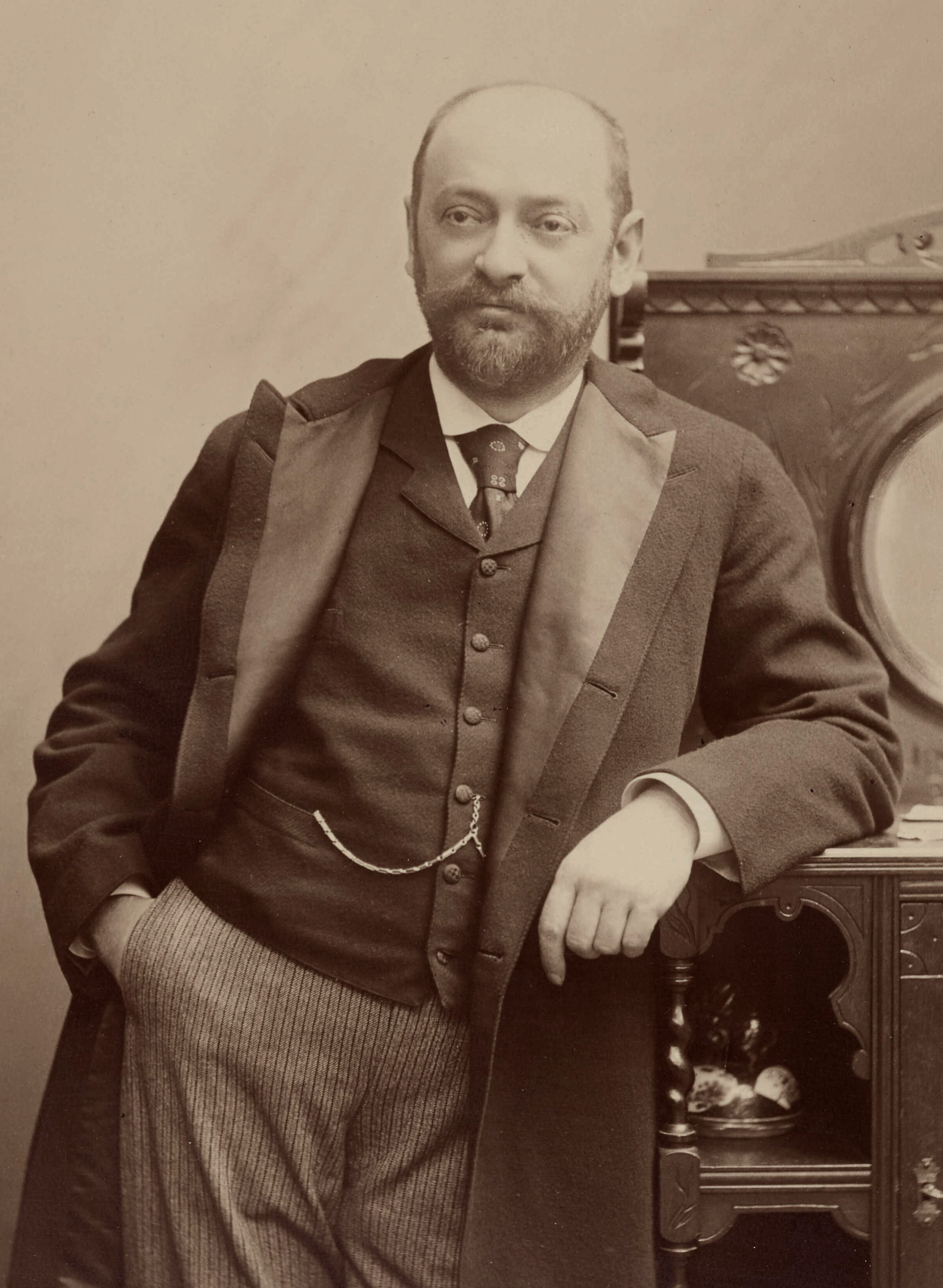
- Grau, c. 1896 (photo by Aimé Dupont, New York)
- Born: 1849; Brünn, Austrian Empire
- Died: 14 March 1907 (aged 57–58); Paris, France

Maurice Hermann Grau (1849 – 14 March 1907) was an Austrian-born American impresario, opera director, and theatre manager and producer. The Americana: A Universal Reference Library stated that "from 1872 until 1903 [Grau] was the most prominent operatic manager in America". He was a named partner in the US theatre management and production firm Abbey, Schoeffel and Grau which managed numerous theaters in Boston and New York City, including the Metropolitan Opera House. As part of this firm Grau co-managed the Metropolitan Opera (the Met) from 1891 until Abbey's death in 1896 when he took over sole management of the Met. He remained the manager of the Met until 1903 when he retired. He was also concurrently the manager of the Royal Opera House in London from 1897 to 1900.

The Oxford Companion to American Theatre stated that, "Although best known for his successful tenure as head of the Metropolitan Opera, he was also important in the growth of popular musical theatre in America." He should not be confused with his cousin, also named Maurice Grau (1857–1934), who was a theatre agent.

== Early life and education ==
Maurice Grau was born in 1849 in Brünn, Austrian Empire (now Brno, Czech Republic) to Moravian parents Emmanuel and Rosalie Grau. The Grau family immigrated to the United States in 1854 when Maurice was five years old, settling in New York City where Emmanuel and Rosalie operated a boarding house. Maurice was educated in the New York City public school system and then attended the New York Free Academy (now City College of New York) where he graduated in 1867. He then matriculated to Columbia Law School and while a student there was an apprentice in the law firm of Morrison, Lauterbach & Spitgarn.

Grau abandoned his law ambitions in favor of a career in the theatre, largely due to the influence of his uncle, Jacob Grau, who was a theatre impresario specializing in importing French opéra bouffe to the United States. Maurice began working for his uncle as a child, selling libretti to patrons at his uncle's opera house. His uncle was appointed director of the Academy of Music in New York in 1862, but after a difficult tenure there during the American Civil War he left to take over the management the Theatre Français in 1866. At this time Maurice began working for his uncle in more serious theatre business endeavors at the age of seventeen, and in 1872 he ultimately decided to not pursue the legal profession but embrace a career in artist management.

== Early arts management career with Carlo A. Chizzola ==
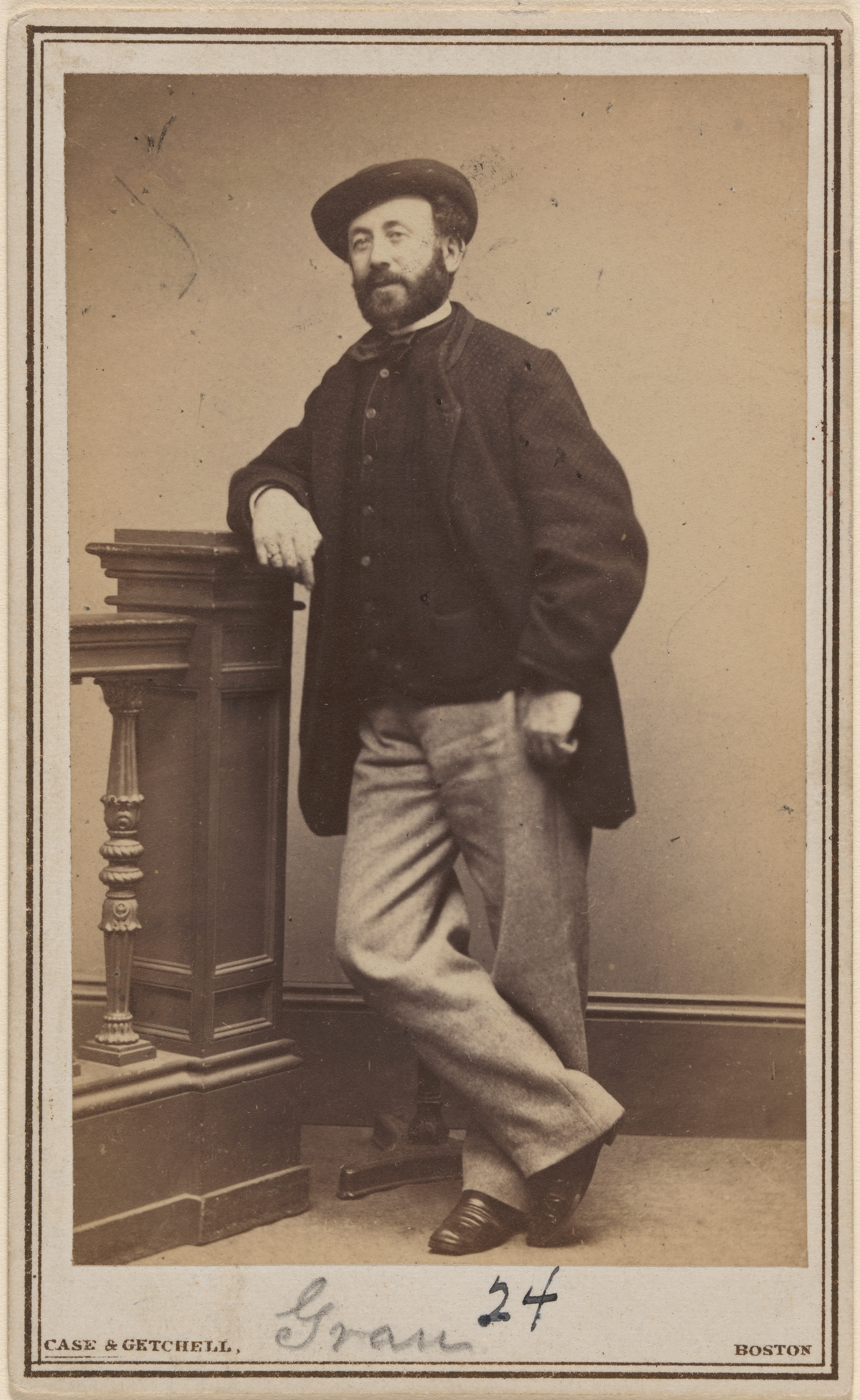
Grau, c. 1863 (photo by Case and Getchell, Boston)

Grau began his career as a theatre manager and producer in 1872 when he formed a partnership with Carlo A. Chizzola. Their partnership resulted in the first significant achievement of Grau's career: bringing the French soprano Marie Aimée to the United States. Grau and Chizzola became Aimée's manager on 12 February 1872. Theatre scholars Gerald Bordman and Thomas S. Hischak credited Aimée's American appearances with popularizing not only the genre of opéra bouffe in the United States but also setting the foundation for the popularity of the musical in the country.

Grau was also responsible for bringing Anton Rubinstein to the United States for his much lauded and profitable 1872–1873 American tour. This tour was organized under the auspices of the Steinway & Sons company, as was another tour Grau oversaw that year featuring the violinist Henryk Wieniawski. In 1873 he co-founded the English Opera Company with Clara Kellogg, but this venture proved financially unsuccessful. He next brought the Italian actor Tommaso Salvini to the United States, but his American tour of plays by William Shakespeare performed in Italian also failed to make money. After this, Grau became the manager of New York's Fourteenth Street Theatre (FST) in 1874 but continued to struggle financially. Entertainers whom Grau brought to New York to star in productions at the FST included actresses Clara Rousby, Adelaide Ristori, and Adelaide Neilson; actor John Lawrence Toole; and the English Opera Bouffe Company, led by its manager and star Emily Soldene.

In 1875, amidst a financial crises, Grau and Chizzola's partnership ceased.

== Bringing Offenbach and other European artists to America ==
Grau rebounded with a 1876 tour featuring the French composer Jacques Offenbach. While publicly considered a triumph for Grau, the composer's high fees made it financially a losing proposition. Offenbach's thirty performances at Madison Square Garden were a monetary failure, but these were offset partly by record-breaking box office sales of a production of La Vie parisienne staged at Broadway's Booth Theatre, produced by Grau and featuring Offenbach as conductor and Marie Aimée as its star. Grau's finances were further improved by money forfeited to him by the actor Ernesto Rossi who abandoned his contract with Grau to come to New York in favor of staying in Paris.

Grau made a large amount of money when he brought a French theatre troupe led by Paola Marie and Victor Capoul to the United States in a highly successful tour in 1879. The tour also included a further seventeen months of performances across South America, Mexico, and Cuba. He also organized a tour featuring soprano Adelina Patti. Other prominent European artists he brought to the United States included actors Benoît-Constant Coquelin, Jean Mounet-Sully, and Henry Irving; and actresses Sarah Bernhardt, Gabrielle Réjane, and Jane Hading.

== Abbey, Schoeffel and Grau and the Metropolitan Opera ==
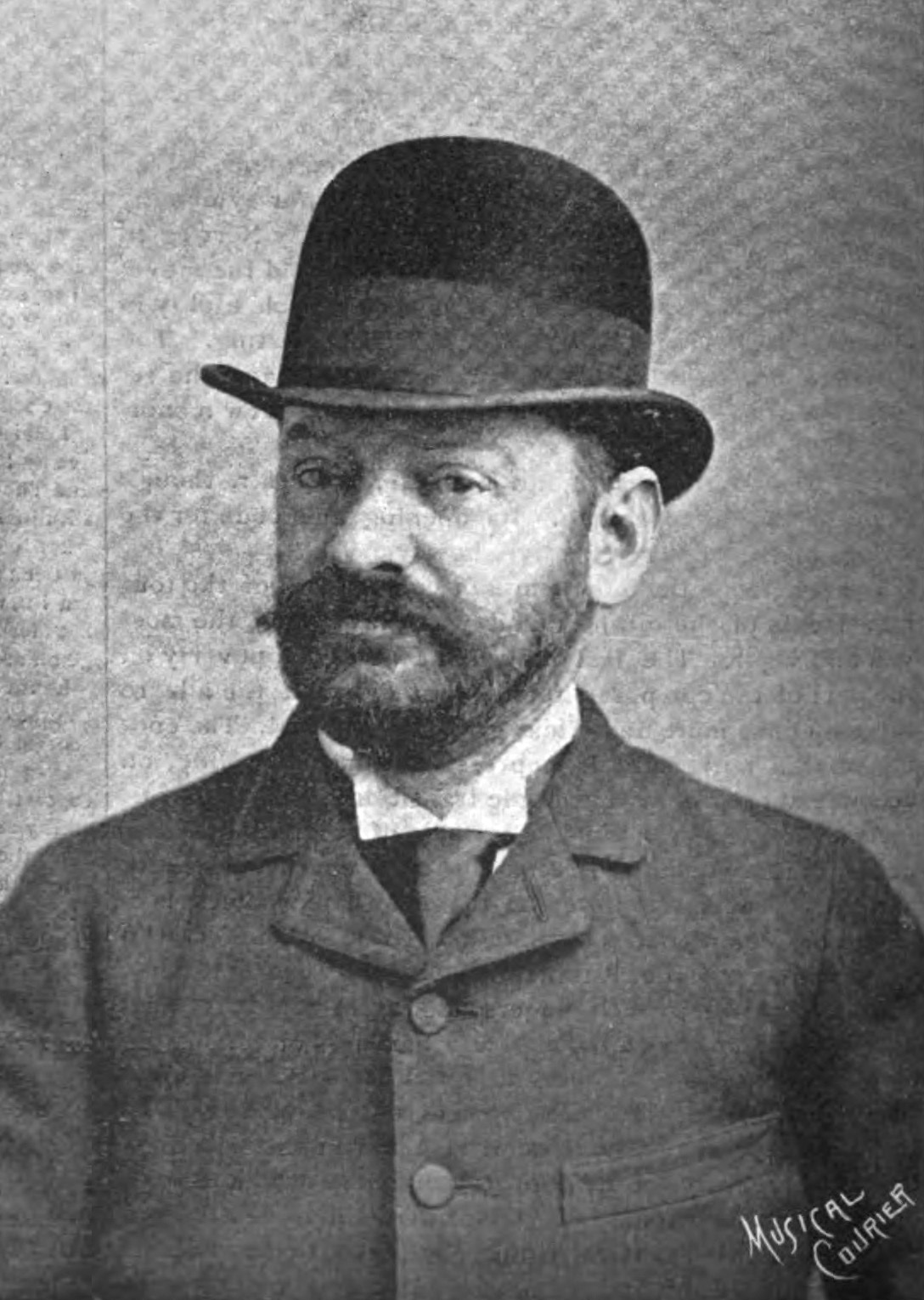
Grau, c. 1891 (Musical Courier)

Grau's collaborative relationship with fellow theatre managers and producers Henry Eugene Abbey and John B. Schoeffel extended to as early as 1882. A formally structured partnership between the three men however, did not materialize until five years later. In 1883 Grau married opera singer Maria Louise Durand (also known as Marie Durand). In the same year he played a significant though unofficial role in the newly created Metropolitan Opera in New York when Abbey served as the Met's first managing director. Grau did not hold an official title at this point, but did the work of the Met's business manager for Abbey during its first season. Abbey did not renew his contract with the Met after its first year. It was rumored that Grau was a leading contender for his replacement, but Grau chose not to apply for the position.

In 1887 Grau joined forces with Schoeffel and Abbey to organize a tour featuring the French stage actress Sarah Bernhardt. The tremendous success of this tour led the men to establish the theatre management and production firm Abbey, Schoeffel and Grau immediately following this tour.

Grau's association with the Metropolitan Opera was renewed in 1890 when he partnered with Abbey to bring a special series of 21 opera performances to the Met stage. On 15 January 1891, Abbey, Schoeffel and Grau were officially named co-managers of the Met, initially with the intent that the three would transform the Met from a German repertoire-only opera house into a company that focused on works from the Italian and French opera canons. This was deemed necessary as the public had expressed weariness with the operas of Richard Wagner. The three men successfully implemented this shift, although during the six years that they co-managed the Met they also slowly brought German repertory back into its performance rotation.

Grau was the Met's sole manager from 1898 to 1903. As the Met's manager he was known for putting together casts consisting of "all stars".

== Later life and death ==
Poor health caused Grau to announce his retirement from the Metropolitan Opera in 1902, stating that he would end his career at the conclusion of the 1902–1903 season. He became more seriously ill in December 1906. He died at his home in Paris on 14 March 1907.

He was named a Chevalier of the Legion of Honour by the Government of France.
