= Henry Eugene Abbey =

American theatre manager and producer

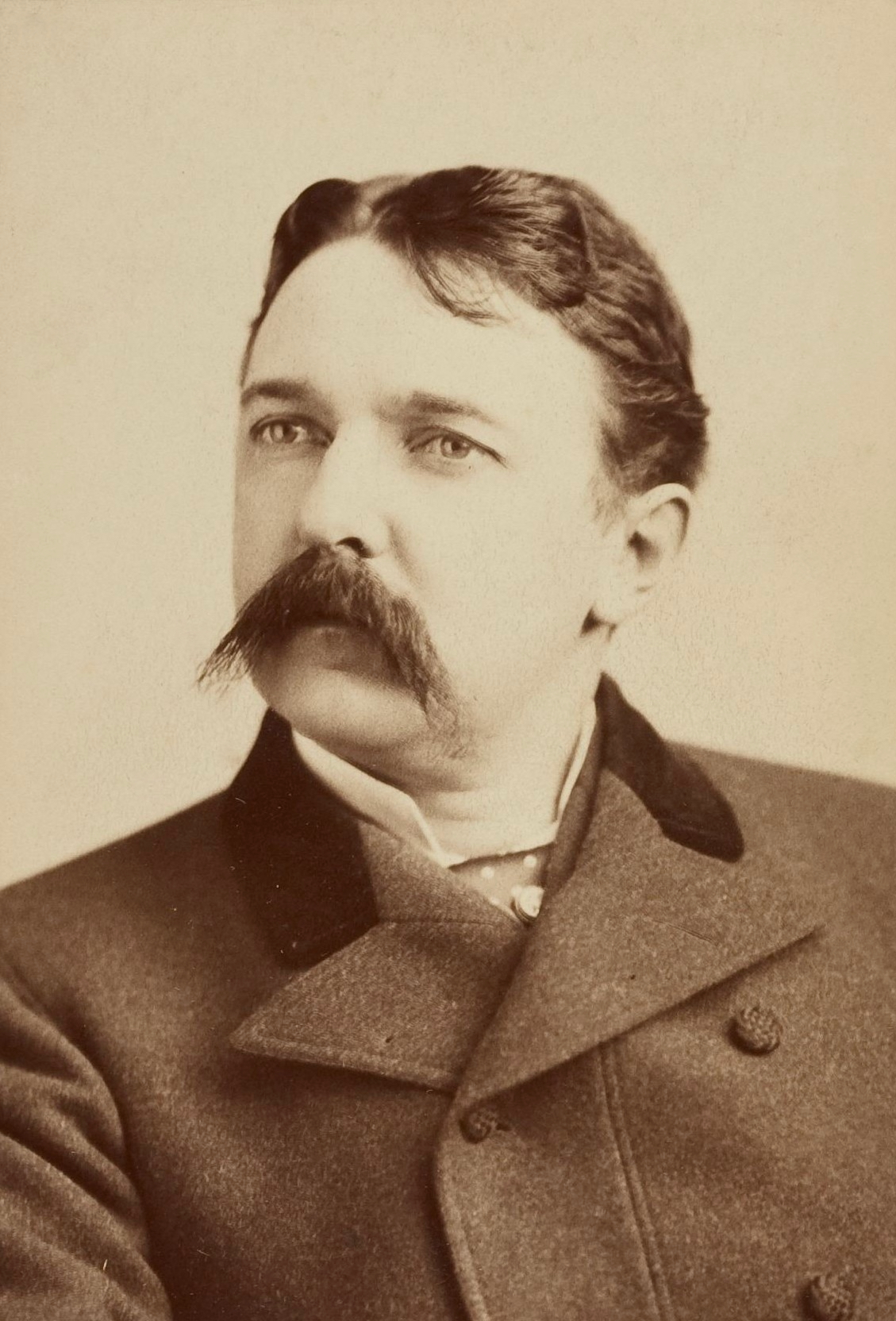
- Portrait of H. E. Abbey
- Born: June 27, 1846; Akron, Ohio, U.S.
- Died: October 17, 1896 (aged 50); New York City, U.S.
- Occupation: Manager
- Years active: 1870–1896
- Spouses: Kate Kingsley, Florence Gerard
- Parents: Henry Stephen Abbey (father); Elizabeth Smith Abbey (mother)

Henry Eugene Abbey (June 27, 1846 – October 17, 1896) was an American theatre manager and producer.

== Early life ==
Henry E. Abbey was born in Akron, Ohio on June 27, 1846, to clockmaker Henry Stephen Abbey and Elizabeth Smith Abbey. He engaged in business with his father, a jeweller, until 1869, when he leased the Akron Opera House.

== Career ==
During the 1870s - 1890s, he managed such prominent Broadway theatres as Booth's, Wallack's, Abbey's Theatre and Abbey's Park Theatre promoting the talents of some of the foremost American actors of his day, as well as European stars. In 1882 with John B. Schoeffel and Maurice Grau he formed the theatrical management partnership of Abbey, Schoeffel and Grau.

Abbey was the first lessee and manager of the inaugural season in 1883 of the 'old' Metropolitan Opera House, with Grau's own Opera Company and stars. The season was a critical success but a financial flop. Abbey as manager was personally responsible for losses of $250,000. Christina Nilsson's and Marcella Sembrich's cachets, known to be high, explain 40% of this losses.

He managed the tours of Adelina Patti, Francesco Tamagno and the London Gaity in America, and he introduced Sarah Bernhardt to America. He opened Boston's Park Theatre in 1879. He also opened Abbey's Theatre in 1890, one of the first theatrical managers to present expensive shows outside of the major cities.

Abbey, Schoeffel and Grau returned to the 'Met' in 1891, and Abbey continued as manager there until his death. He died in New York City on October 17, 1896, at the age of 50.

== Legacy ==
One of his longest lasting legacies was his bringing a group of Spanish performers, known as the Spanish Students, to the United States. These performers inspired imitators and gave rise to the widespread playing of the mandolin in the United States, where it was previously unknown.

== Personal life ==
He married Kate Kingsley in 1876, and had two children with her. He married again in 1886, to the actress Florence Gerard. She appeared at the new Wallack's Theatre at 30th Street and Broadway while Abbey was manager there.
