= Stuart Robson (actor) =

American actor (1836–1903)

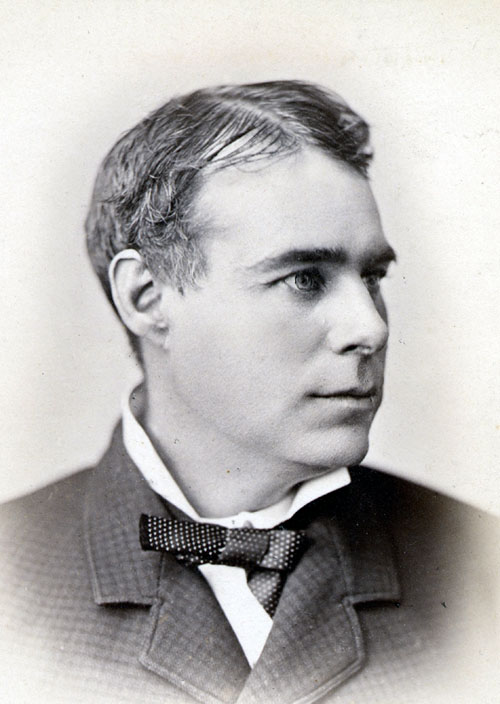
Stuart Robson

Stuart Robson (born Henry Robson Stuart, March 4, 1836 – April 29, 1903) was a comedic stage actor.

== Early life ==
He was born Henry Robson Stuart in Annapolis, Maryland, United States. His parents were Charles Stuart and the former Alicia Ann Thompson.

== Career ==
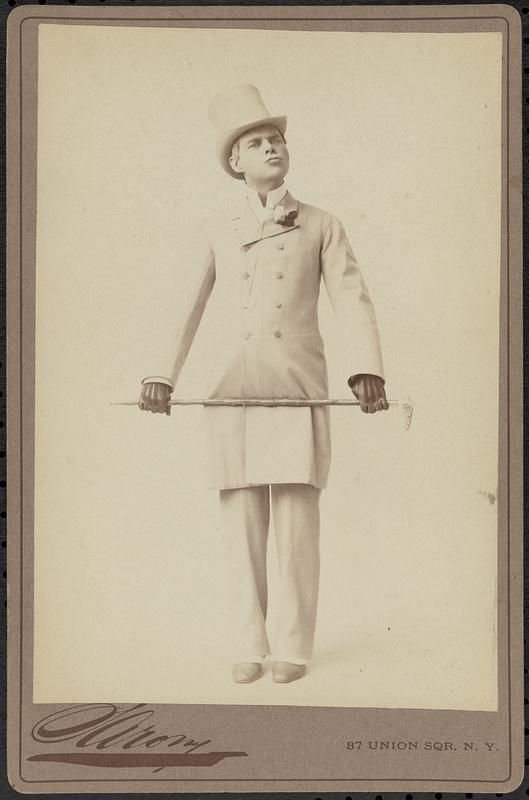
Stuart Robson, ca. 1877-1895; from the Cabinet Card Collection of the Boston Public Library

He appeared in many theatrical productions from the 1860s to the early 1900s in New York City, Boston, and London. He was best known for his long collaboration with William H. Crane, which lasted over ten years. They appeared together in Our Bachelors, Sharps and Flats, The Henrietta, The Merry Wives of Windsor, and She Stoops to Conquer. They were perhaps most popular as the two Dromios in The Comedy of Errors.

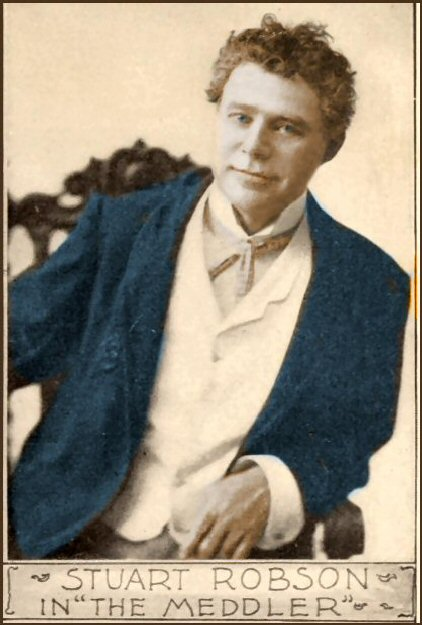
Stuart Robson, American actor

Robson was an eccentric comedian who had a curious voice that was often described as the "Robson Squeek". His first marriage was to Margaret Eleanor Johnson in about 1858. They had a daughter, Alicia Virginia Robson. Margaret died in 1890. Robson married Mary Dougherty, an actress who went by the stage name of May Waldron, in 1891. They had a son, Stuart Robson, Jr., who also acted briefly on the stage in New York and subsequently ran a magic shop there for many years.

== Later years ==
Stuart Robson lived for many years in Cohasset, Massachusetts on the same road as fellow actors William H. Crane and Lawrence Barrett. The road was nicknamed Actors Row. He died in New York City in 1903, and was buried in Cohasset. His second wife, who survived him, continued to appear on the stage under the name May Robson until she died in 1924. She should not be confused with the actress of the same name, May Robson, who appeared in many films in the 1930s.
