= Booth (actor) =

Booth (actor) may refer to:

- Barton Booth (1681–1733), one of the most famous dramatic actors of the first part of the 18th century.
- Edwin Booth, (1833–1893), a famous 19th-century American actor.
- Junius Brutus Booth (1796–1852), an English actor and father of:
  - Junius Brutus Booth Jr. (1821–1883), an American actor and theatre manager.
  - Edwin Thomas Booth (1833–1893), the foremost American tragedian of the mid-to-late 19th century.
  - John Wilkes Booth, (1838–1865), an American actor who assassinated President Abraham Lincoln.
- Agnes Booth (1843–1910), born Marion Agnes Land Rookes, was an Australian born American actress (married to Junius Brutus Booth Jr.)
- Booth Colman (1923–2014), a film, television and stage actor.
- James Booth (1927–2005), an English actor.
- Antony Booth (1931–2017), an English actor, best known for his role as Mike Rawlins in the BBC series Till Death Us Do Part.
- Billy Booth (actor), (1949–2006), an American child actor, perhaps best known for his role as Jay North's best friend Tommy Anderson on the sitcom Dennis the Menace.
- Tim Booth (born 1960), an English singer, dancer, and actor best known as the lead singer from the band James.
- Stefan Booth (born 1979) is an English actor and singer.
- Zachary Booth (born 1982), an American actor.
- Douglas Booth (born 1992), an English actor known for his portrayal of Boy George in the BBC Two television drama Worried About the Boy.
- Cornelius Booth an actor best known for his role as Colonel Fitzwilliam in the 2005 adaptation of Pride & Prejudice.
- Matthew Booth (actor), an English actor from Normanton, West Yorkshire.

See also

- Booth family
- Booth's Theatre
- Lillian Booth Actors Home
