= Mary Booth =

Mary Booth may refer to:

- Mary Ann Booth (1843–1922), American microscopist
- Mary Devlin Booth (1840–1863), American stage actress
- Mary H. C. Booth (1831–1865), American poet
- Mary Louise Booth (1831–1889), American writer and translator, founding editor of Harper's Bazaar, 1867–1889
- Mary McVicker Booth (1848–1881), American stage actress and singer
- Mary Josephine Booth (1876–1965), American librarian, Librarian of Eastern Illinois University, 1904–1945
- Mary Booth (died 1865), close friend and associate of German-American activist and suffragette Mathilde Franziska Anneke
- Lady Mary Booth, wife of Harry Grey, 4th Earl of Stamford, daughter of George Booth, 2nd Earl of Warrington
- Mary Moss (1791–1875), second wife of Samuel Booth, mother of William Booth who founded The Salvation Army
- Mary Booth (physician) (1869–1956), Australian physician and welfare worker
