= John Sleeper Clarke =

American comedian and actor (1833–1899)

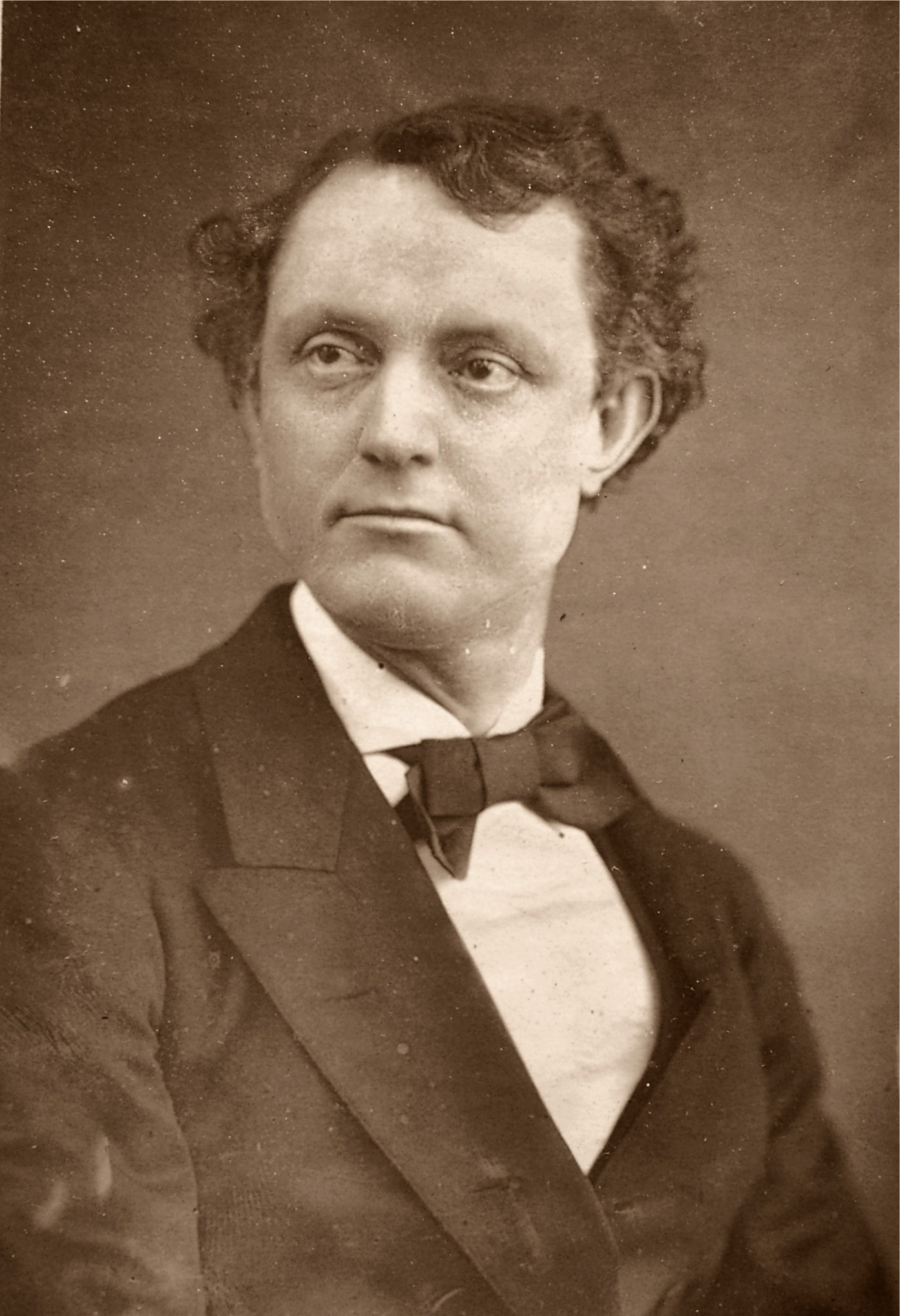
- Born: John Clarke Sleeper (changed to John Sleeper Clarke as his stage name); September 3, 1833; Baltimore, Maryland, U.S.
- Died: September 24, 1899 (aged 66); London, England
- Occupation: Comedic actor
- Spouse: Asia Booth Clarke (m. 1859; died 1888)
- Children: 8

John Sleeper Clarke (September 3, 1833 – September 24, 1899) was a 19th-century American comedian and actor.

== Life ==
He was born in Baltimore, Maryland to George W. Sleeper and Georgianna Sleeper (née Clarke), and was educated for the law. In his boyhood he was a schoolmate of Edwin Booth who was born in the same year as he, and with whom he engaged in amateur dramatic readings as members of the Baltimore Thespian Club.

He made his first appearance in Boston as Frank Hardy in Paul Pry in 1851, at the Howard Athenæum. The next year he went to Philadelphia. Clarke's first appearance in New York City was made at the Metropolitan Theatre – afterward called the Winter Garden – on May 15, 1855, as Dickory in The Spectre Bridegroom, but it was not until he returned in 1861–1862 to the same theatre that he made a conspicuous mark. In 1859 he became part of the Booth family when he married Asia Booth, daughter of Junius Brutus Booth, and sister of John Wilkes Booth. Clarke was associated with his brother-in-law Edwin Booth in the management of the Winter Garden Theatre in New York, the Walnut Street Theatre in Philadelphia and the Boston Theatre.

Following the 1865 assassination of US president Abraham Lincoln by Clarke's brother-in-law, John Wilkes Booth, Clarke came into the possession of two letters, from his wife, written by the assassin. He turned them over to The Philadelphia Inquirer, which printed one of the two letters. His actions led to his arrest and imprisonment in the Capitol Prison in Washington D.C. for a month. Once released, he notified his pregnant wife that they must divorce. He wanted to distance himself professionally from the name of Booth. She refused to divorce him, even as their relationship grew increasingly strained. However, they remained married in name only. "...He lives a free going bachelor life and does what he likes..." wrote Asia to her brother Edwin. She died May 16, 1888, at the age of 52.

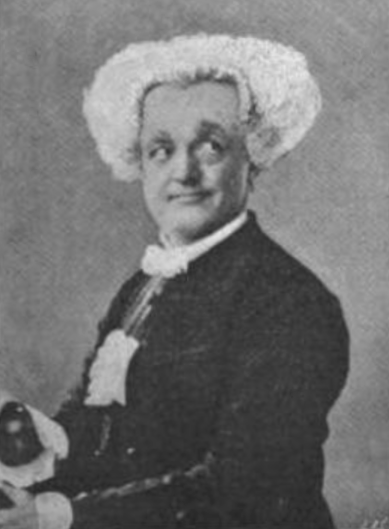
As Dr. Pangloss in The Heir at Law

In August 1865, just months after the assassination, Asia gave birth to twins Creston and Lilian.

In 1867, Clarke moved his family to London, where Asia became a poet and a writer. Clarke made his first appearance at the St James's Theatre as Major Wellington de Boots in Stirling Coyne's Everybody's Friend, rewritten for him and called The Widow's Hunt. At the Princess's in February 1868, he was Salem Scudder in a revival of The Octoroon, and later, at the Strand, was the first Young Gosling in Fox versus Goose. On July 26, 1869, he was the first Babington Jones in John Brougham's Among the Breakers. At the same house he also played Toodles, Dr. Pangloss in The Heir at Law, and other parts. His success was so great that he remained in England for the rest of his life, except for four visits to America.

Among his favorite parts were Timothy Toodle in William E. Burton's The Toodles, which ran for 200 nights at the Strand Theatre, and two roles from plays by George Colman "the Younger": Dr. Pangloss in The Heir at Law, and Dr. Ollapod in The Poor Gentleman. At the beginning of his career Clarke wished to play tragedy, but he later turned to comic roles. He managed several London theatres, including the Haymarket, where he preceded the Bancrofts. He retired in 1889.

== Death and legacy ==
Clarke died suddenly, in London, at 66 years old, on September 24, 1899. Four days later, his remains were interred at Teddington Cemetery in what is now the London Borough of Richmond upon Thames. Among the mourners were Mr. and Mrs. Clement Scott, Charles Hawtrey, the staff of the Strand Theatre, and Clarke's two sons, Creston and Wilfred. Many beautiful wreaths were placed upon the coffin.

He and his wife Asia had nine children. Their sons Creston and Wilfred went on to become actors.

== See also ==
- List of show business families

== Sources ==
- This article incorporates text from a publication now in the public domain: Knight, John Joseph (1901). "Clarke, John Sleeper". In Lee, Sidney (ed.). Dictionary of National Biography (1st supplement). London: Smith, Elder & Co.
- Swanson, James L. (2006). Manhunt – The Twelve Day Chase for Lincoln's Killer. HarperCollins. ISBN 0-06-051849-9 – via Internet Archive.
- Winter, William, (1913). "John Sleeper Clarke" in The Wallet of Time. Volume One. New York: Moffat, Yard and Company. pp. 278–282.
