= Ben DeBar =

American actor-manager

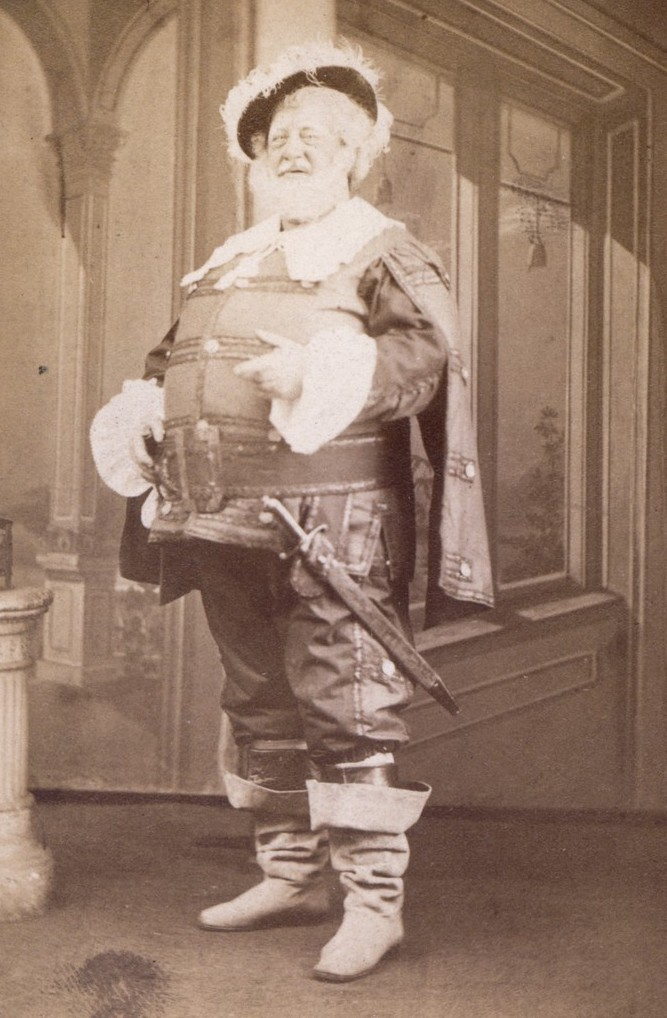
DeBar as Falstaff

Benedict DeBar (1812–1877) was a prominent American actor-manager. He is associated with operating a major theater in St. Louis, and best known for portraying the role of Falstaff. He was also connected by marriage with the Booth family of actors.

== Career ==
Born in England, he came to America as an equestrian performer in 1837. He was the stage manager for Noah Ludlow and Sol Smith (uncle of Sol Smith Russell) for their St. Charles Theater in New Orleans and, when they retired in 1843, he assumed ownership of their New Orleans and St. Louis theaters.

Upon the outbreak of the American Civil War, he moved St. Louis, but retained ownership of the St. Charles Theater in New Orleans until 1876. In 1873, he moved from the St. Louis Theatre to DeBar's Grand Opera House. He remained active as a performer even while managing his theatrical companies. For example, he opened the 1862–1863 season in war ravaged St. Louis in September 1862, started the season with a company that included himself as a comedian, Emma Maddern as the stock 'chambermaid', and Ella and Mary Maddern as the 'walking ladies.'

DeBar is credited for first presenting Emma Maddern, mother of actress Emily Stevens and community theater director Robert Stevens, as an actress. He was also associated with Thomas Davey, who managed a circuit of theaters in the old Southwest. Davey was also married to Elizabeth Maddern, sister of Emma Maddern and mother of actress Mrs. Fiske.

=== Falstaff ===
As an actor, DeBar was best known for portraying William Shakespeare's character Falstaff. In 1878, a statue of Shakespeare was dedicated in Tower Grove Park, St. Louis; on the east face of the monument base is a depiction of DeBar as Falstaff. He was perhaps motivated to explore this character, as he grew corpulent with age.

== Family ==
DeBar married twice, first in 1838 in New York City to Mary Conduit, an opera singer who had been a widow. DeBar and Conduit, together, had a daughter, Alma DeBar, who, on April 28, 1864, in Saint Louis, Missouri, married James Vila Dexter (1836–1899). Mary Conduit DeBar died of consumption October 29, 1841, aboard the steamboat Maid of Kentucky on the Mississippi River, near Cape Girardeau, Missouri, 140 miles (225 km) south of St. Louis. She was buried in Cape Girardeau.

DeBar again married in 1843 to Henrietta Emma Adalaide Vallée (1828–1894), who died at the Edwin Forrest House in Philadelphia.

=== Lincoln assassination ===
Clementine DeBar Booth (1810–1874), sister of Ben DeBar, was the mother of Blanche Booth (1844–1930), who was the daughter of Junius Brutus Booth Jr., and the niece of John Wilkes Booth, the assassin of Abraham Lincoln. Junius and Clementine divorced when Blanche was a child, and Ben DeBar adopted her. Following the assassination of Abraham Lincoln, The DeBar house in St. Louis was thoroughly searched. Ben DeBar was known in St. Louis as a Southern sympathizer ("At the outbreak of the war he was several times admonished by the Provost Marshals for pandering to rebel tastes on the stage of his Theater"), but the investigation into the assassination concluded that as the war was drawing to a close, he had modified his sympathies to protect his pecuniary interests. Blanche was an actress, using her mother's (and adopted father's) name, Blanche DeBar.

== Death ==
He died August 28, 1877, in St. Louis of "disease of the brain". His estate was contested in St. Louis Probate Court by his widow—filed January 24, 1878)—who claimed that a power of attorney given to John G. Priest, executor – which deprived her of her right of dower involving a large amount of real estate claimed by Ben DeBar's creditors – was a forgery.
