= Mary Devlin Booth =

American actress

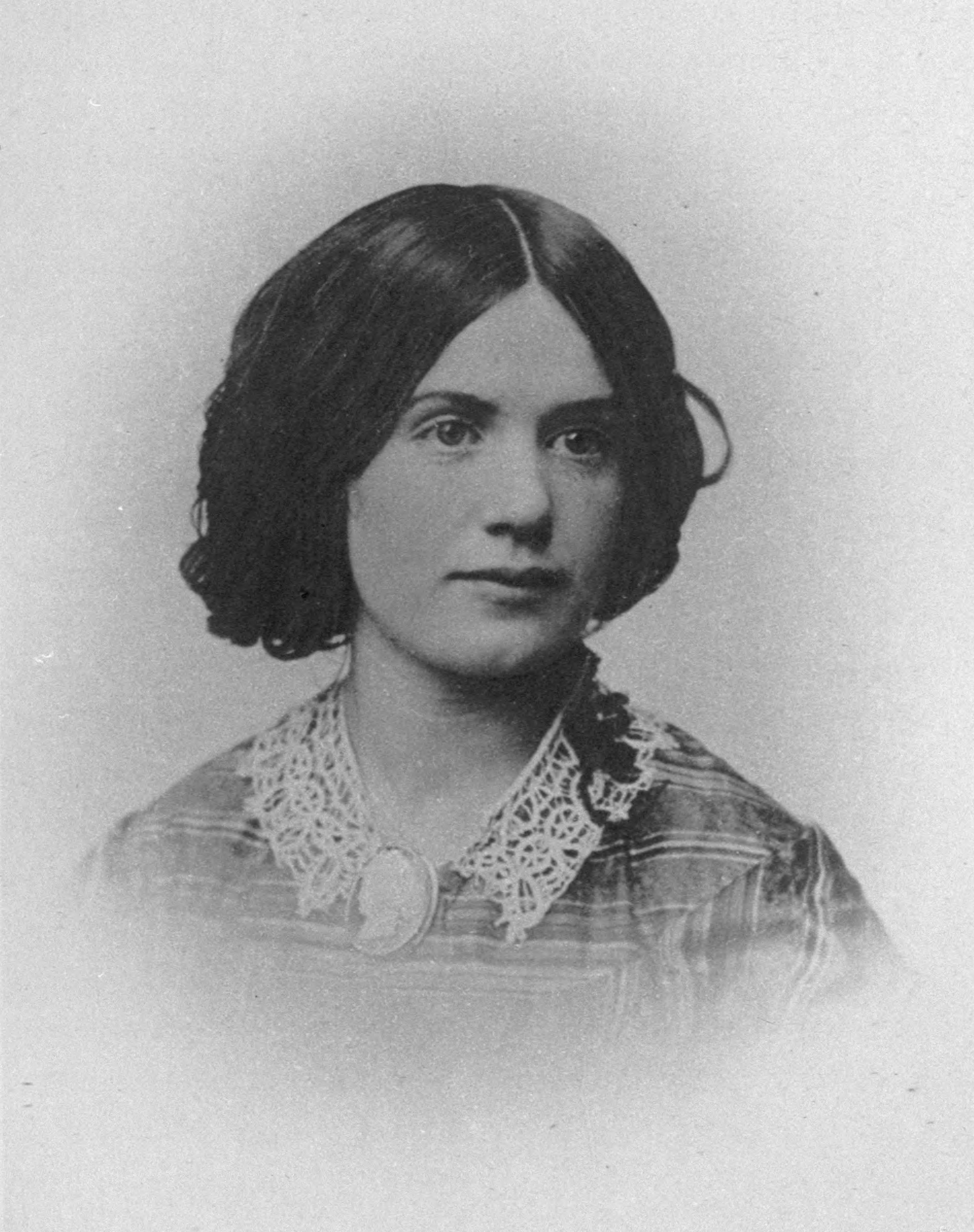
- Born: Mary Devlin; April 19, 1840; Troy, New York
- Died: February 20, 1863 (aged 22)
- Resting place: Mount Auburn Cemetery
- Occupation: Actress
- Spouse: Edwin Booth (m. 1860)
- Children: Edwina Booth Grossman

Mary Devlin Booth (May 19, 1840 – February 21, 1863) was an American stage actress and the first wife of actor Edwin Booth.

== Private life ==
Booth was born Mary Devlin in Troy, New York, on May 19, 1840. She married Edwin Booth on July 7, 1860, at which point she retired from acting. Through this marriage, she became a part of the prominent Booth family. The couple had one child together, Edwina Booth Grossman.

Booth died on February 21, 1863, after which Edwin Booth briefly retired from acting. She is buried at Mount Auburn Cemetery in Cambridge, Massachusetts beside her daughter and husband.

== Career ==
In 1860, Booth appeared as Juliet in a production of Romeo and Juliet, alongside actress Charlotte Cushman, who played Romeo.

Booth was portrayed by actress Maggie McNamara in the 1955 film Prince of Players.
