= Booth's Theatre =

Former theatre in Manhattan, New York

Coordinates: 40°44′33″N 73°59′34″W

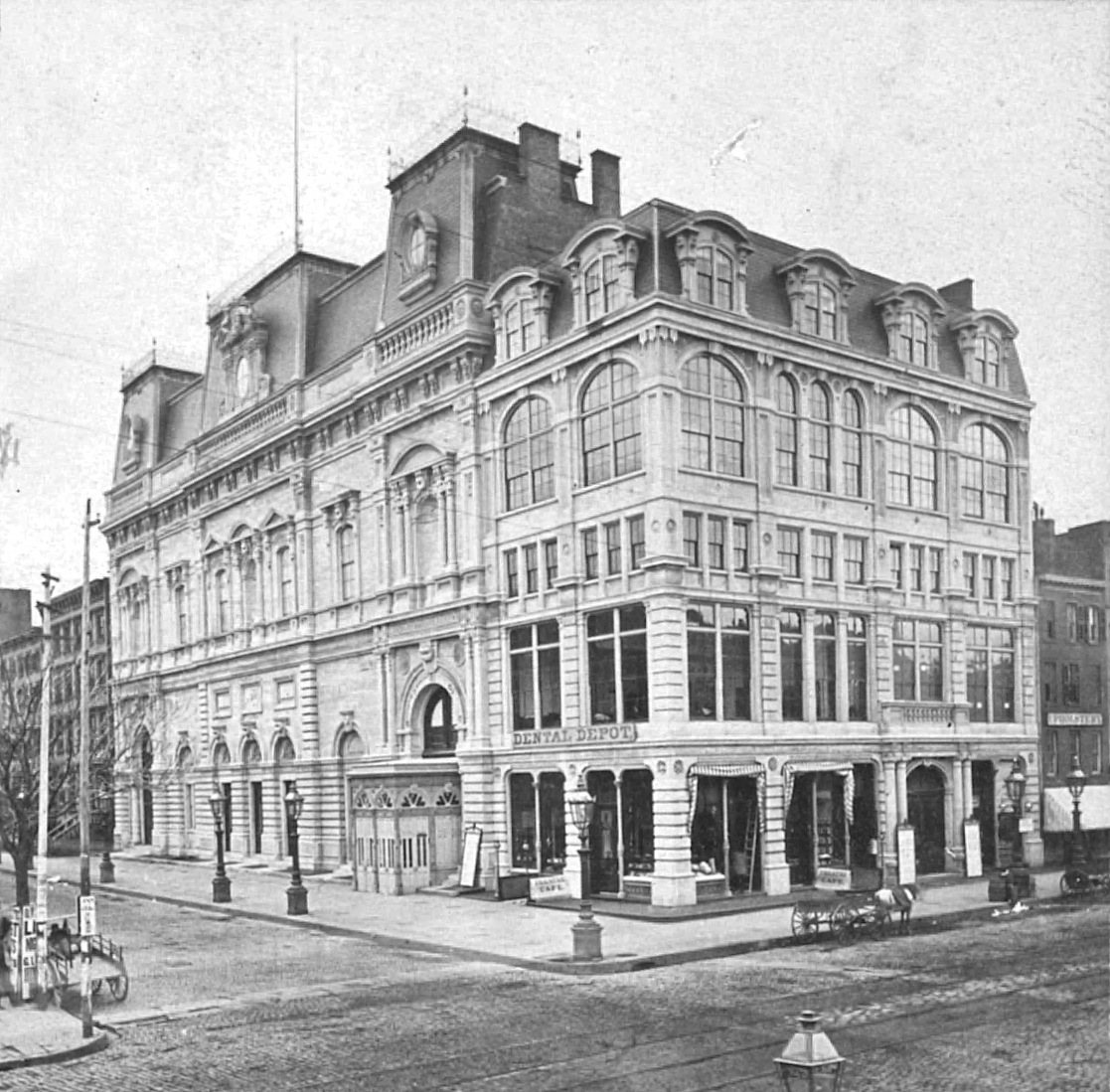
- Photograph of the exterior of Booth's Theatre, viewed from diagonally across the intersection of 23rd Street and Sixth Avenue
- Interactive map of Booth's Theatre

Booth's Theatre was a theatre in New York built by actor Edwin Booth. Located on the southeast corner of 23rd Street and Sixth Avenue, Booth's Theatre opened on February 3, 1869.

The theatre featured a grand vestibule with Italian marble floors and a large statue of Edwin Booth's father, the Shakespearean actor Junius Brutus Booth, by the sculptor Thomas Ridgeway Gould. The auditorium was similarly elaborate in its decor, and featured a large chandelier, as well as a stage that incorporated the most modern machinery in use at the time, such as hydraulic rams to raise and lower scenery, and stage lights that could be completely extinguished during the performance, a first in the United States.

Despite the appearances by important talent of the times, Booth could not make the theatre a financially viable enterprise. It was sold in December 1881, and was converted into McCreery & Co. department store until 1965, when it was demolished to make room for a parking lot.

== History ==
In 1869, Edwin Booth, then one of the world's most distinguished stage tragedians and arguably America's greatest Prince Hamlet, opened his theatre, Booth's Theatre, in Manhattan on the southeast corner of 23rd Street and Sixth Avenue.

Central to the identity of Booth's theatre was the stage background of Edwin Booth. Booth belonged to the Booth family dynasty, which ruled the American stage in the 19th century. After his father's death in 1852, Booth toured internationally, visiting Australia and Hawaii and briefly settling in California before returning to the East Coast.

Booth had been drawn to the idea of erecting his own theatre, particularly after he purchased the Walnut Street Theatre in Philadelphia. Plans overtook Booth when a tragic fire of 1867 consumed The Winter Garden Theatre—Booth's usual performing home in New York—-and with it much of Booth's personal wardrobe. The new theatre was to be one of the finest of its time, called in the press "A fitting temple for the presentation of Shakespearean drama."

Booth's Theatre remained Booth's new performing home for several years, during which time Booth and his elder brother Junius Brutus Booth Jr., presented productions of the classics and hosted guest artists, such as Joseph Jefferson in his popular Rip Van Winkle and Milnes Levick in Julius Caesar. Finally, due in part to bad management, Booth lost the theatre to bankruptcy in 1874, and "never again participated in theatrical management." In 1883 the theatre was converted into a department store, which was demolished in 1965. Presently, the land is occupied by a Best Buy electronics store.

=== Construction ===
On April 8, 1868, after the removal of several old structures and blasting out an unexpected "stone ledge" at the corner of Twenty Third and Sixth Avenue, Edwin Booth, after "Masonic observances", laid the cornerstone for his new theatre. Designed by the architectural firm of Renwick and Sands the theatre was made of granite in the Second Empire style, with an impressive front, iron-trimmed facing north on Twenty Third Street of one hundred and fifty feet in length. An additional wing extending to Sixth Avenue to the west, housed construction shops, studios and additional rooms—one of which was reserved for Edwin Booth. North to south, the theatre was one hundred feet, and stood at a height of one hundred and twenty feet, topped with a mansard roof, including three towers. Under the side walk along Twenty Third Street was the carpenter's shop, as well as a boiler-room with a steam engine used to heat the theatre through extensive hot-air pipes. The entire theatre was heated and cooled with forced air.

Several arched doors led to a grand vestibule, where a large statue of Edwin Booth's father, the great Shakespearean actor, Junius Brutus Booth, by the sculptor Thomas Ridgeway Gould, greeted the audience. The floor was Italian marble, the ceiling was covered with frescoes. In the theatre, a large chandelier, lit by gas-jets and ignited by electricity, hung above the auditorium. Marble pillars, adorned with statues, surrounded the box seats. In the center, above the proscenium arch stood a statue of Shakespeare by the Italian sculptor Signor G. Turini. Portrait busts of David Garrick, Edmund Kean and other great actors adorned the proscenium arch.

The stage itself was equipped with the most modern stage machinery then in use. The deck of the stage had double-floors. Two spiral staircases at the rear corners of the stage led to four fly galleries. Scenery was raised and lowered by hydraulic rams under the stage.

These were but some of the innovations that made the theatre an architectural marvel in New York. Others included one of New York's first sprinkler systems for fire prevention, and, backstage, sets of hydraulic rams were used to raise moving bridges and platforms to change scenery.

In addition, stage lights—for the first time in the United States—could be completely extinguished both in the auditorium and on the stage during the performance through the use of an electric spark ignition system. This allowed crews to plunge the entire theatre—both stage and auditorium—into complete darkness during a performance of Booth's Hamlet.

Booth's Theatre, modeled after the finest theatres of Europe, and using American inventiveness, was a marvel of technology and a palace of theatrical pleasure.

=== Opening night ===
Booth chose to open his new theatre with a sumptuous production of William Shakespeare's Romeo and Juliet, starring leading actress Mary F. McVicker as Juliet and Booth as Romeo, supported by a "full and efficient company" of actors. The program also noted that "The tragedy will be produced in strict accordance with historical propriety, in every respect, following closely the text of Shakespeare".

Opening night was called "a great event in theatrical circles" by the New York Times. Seats for the opening performance were sold at public auction for a total of $10,000.

The popular run of Romeo and Juliet lasted ten weeks, earning nearly sixty thousand dollars, then considered an exceptional triumph. Two years before Booth had played Hamlet to McVicker's Ophelia at the famous McVicker's Theatre in Chicago, leading to his invitation for her to play opposite Booth in New York. McVicker's performance at Booth's Theatre marked her New York stage debut. That same season she played Desdemona to Booth's Othello at Booth's Theatre, and, on May 29, 1869, made her farewell performance in that role. A little over a week later, Booth married McVicker, and then returned to acting at his theatre.

For five years—called "five brilliant but disastrous seasons" in the New York Times—Edwin Booth struggled to make his theatre a profitable enterprise, but it was not to be. Despite his performing on the stage, and booking some of the leading talent at Booth's Theatre, such as his friend Joseph Jefferson, it was not possible to pay the bills. As William Winter, Booth's friend and eventual biographer wrote:

"Booth was a dreamer; and in every part of his life as it was known to me during an intimacy extending over a period of about thirty years, I saw the operation of Hamlet's propensity to view all things as transitory and immaterial, and to let everything drift. He was happier as an actor than as a manager."

Try as he might, Booth could not make his theatre into a viable business enterprise. Once again he turned to touring with his successful productions of Hamlet, Othello, and Richelieu, to raise funds he sent back to New York, but nothing could produce enough money to keep the doors of Booth's Theatre open. He relied on the advice and "experience of others" to run the theatre, but it was not in his nature. The press, in writing of Booth's departure from managing his own theatre, suggested that "it is true that the frames have sometimes outshone the pictures," meaning that the spectacle of lavish sets and costumes at times upstaged the performances of the actors in Booth's productions, especially, apparently, the performances of the women. Even when shows were financial successes, such as the revival of the popular The Little Detective and the hit drama Little Nell and the Marchioness both starring the renowned Charlotte Crabtree in 1871, the theatre was still in debt. Finally, in 1874, only five years after the triumphant opening Romeo and Juliet, Booth lost the theatre to bankruptcy, and "never again participated in theatrical management".

=== Closing ===
After being sold by Booth, the theatre was owned by several different managers, including the theatrical impresarios Augustin Daly, Dion Boucicault and Henry E. Abbey.

Despite the appearances by important talent of the times, such as Dion Boucicault Jr., who made his stage début in his father's play, Louis XI, Joseph Jefferson as Rip Van Winkle, Polish born actress Helena Modjeska as Juliet, and the French-born "devine Sarah" – Sarah Bernhardt – who appeared in her acclaimed production of Adrienne Lecouveur in 1881, and despite successful runs of comedies, such as Bronson Howard's smash hit Love in the Green Room, and spectacular productions featuring lavish historical recreations such as Shakespeare's Henry V (see photo, left), the theatre could not sustain itself. In 1882 Oedipus Rex was performed there to a sold-out audience which included Oscar Wilde, Robert Barnwell Roosevelt, his mistress Marion O'Shea Fortescue, the mother of Granville Roland Fortescue, and composer Joaquin Miller, but even such well regarded operas and elegant audiences couldn't revive the theater.

Booth's Theatre ended as it began, with Shakespeare's Romeo and Juliet. The last performance at Booth's Theatre was played by the famed actress Helena Modjeska, portraying the role of Juliet in Romeo and Juliet in 1883. The production was given as a benefit performance (as was common in the era), for Andrew Boyd, beloved janitor of the building – a fitting farewell, perhaps, to one of New York's great theatres. After the production closed, the building was turned into a large department store.

On December 31, 1881, a headline in the New York Times read:

BOOTH'S THEATRE SOLD
THE PLAY HOUSE TO BE MADE A DRY GOODS STORE

Booth's Theatre was sold yesterday for $550,000, less than half its original cost. The building will be devoted by its new owners to business purposes, and it is probable that as early as next May the work of altering it will be begun, although it may be continued as a theatre for another year. It is rather a singular coincidence that one of the gentlemen interested in the present purchase of the property should be a gentlemen who sold the original site to Mr. Booth when he conceived of the idea of erecting a theatre that should be a fitting temple for the presentation of Shakespearean drama.

The building lived on as the McCreery & Co. department store, and was finally demolished in 1965 to make room for a parking lot.

In December 1878, Booth wrote an open letter in The Christian Union, in which he observed:

If the management of theatres could be denied to speculators, and placed in the hands of actors who value their reputation and respect their calling, the stage would at least afford healthy recreation, if not, indeed, a wholesome stimulus to the exercise of noble sentiments. But while the theatre is permitted to be a mere shop for gain,—pen to every huckster of immoral gim-cracks,—there is no other way to discriminate between the pure and base than through the experience of others.

Yours truly,

Edwin Booth,

December, 1878.
