= Winter Garden Theatre (1850) =

Former theatre in Manhattan, New York

Coordinates: 40.7259°N 73.9962°W

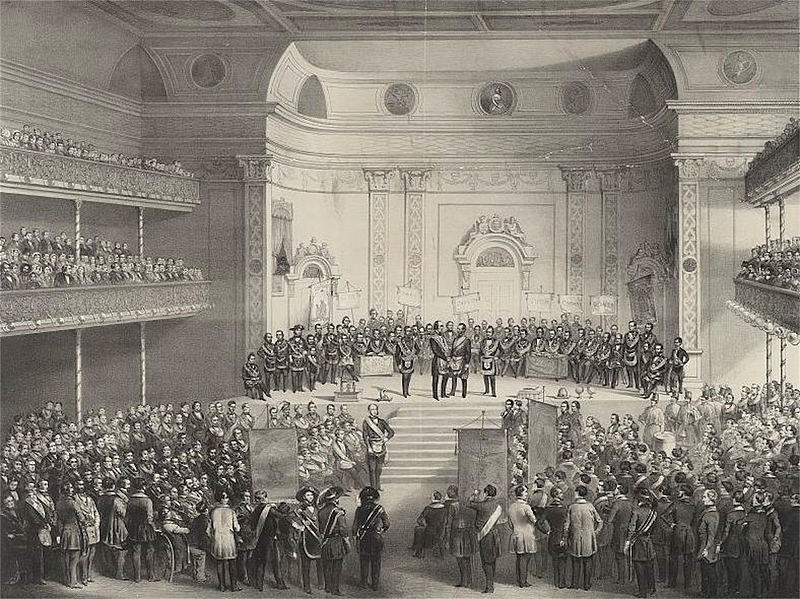
Interior of Tripler Hall, 1850. In 1854 it burned down and was replaced by The New York Theatre, which was renamed The Winter Garden Theatre by the impresario Dion Boucicault after extensive remodeling in 1859.

The first theatre in New York City to bear the name The Winter Garden Theatre had a brief but important seventeen-year history (beginning in 1850) as one of New York's premier showcases for a wide range of theatrical fare, from variety shows to extravagant productions of the works of Shakespeare. Initially known as Tripler's Hall or Metropolitan Hall, it burned down in 1854 and was rebuilt as The New York Theatre. It rose from the ashes under different managers, bearing various names, to become known as one of the most important theatres in New York history. It nearly burned again in November 1864, in a plot hatched by Confederate sympathsizers, and burned to the ground a second time in 1867.

== Showcase ==
Some of the leading actors and theatre managers of the 19th century worked at The Winter Garden Theatre, from Jenny Lind (1820–1887), and Laura Keene (1826–1873), to Dion Boucicault (1820–1890), and Edwin Booth (1833–1893).

One of the most significant and politically influential productions in American theatre history took place at The Winter Garden Theatre on November 25, 1864. Junius Brutus Booth Jr. (1821–1883), Edwin Booth, and John Wilkes Booth (1838–1865), three sons of Junius Brutus Booth (1796–1852), one of America's great acting tragedians, staged a benefit performance of William Shakespeare's Julius Caesar to raise funds to commission a sculpted bronze statue of the playwright by artist/sculptor John Quincy Adams Ward (1830–1910), for New York City's new expansively landscaped Central Park. Four months later on April 14, 1865, John Wilkes Booth fatally shot 16th President Abraham Lincoln at Ford's Theater in Washington D.C., while shouting the historic words of senator Brutus in ancient Rome, upon joining in the murder of Julius Caesar. Throughout its short 17-year existence, The Winter Garden Theatre played a significant role in the history and various notable performances / events of American theatre.

== Groundbreaking ==
The so-called "Jenny Lind Hall", detail from a poster of 1850 before the concert hall was finished.

The theatre was originally planned in 1850 for the first engagement of Jenny Lind, an internationally known singer known as the "Swedish Nightingale". Located at 667 Broadway, Lower Manhattan, New York, across from Bond Street, and south of Amity Street (today's West Third Street), the new theatre was to be "one of the largest musical halls in the world," boasting one of the largest stages in New York City.

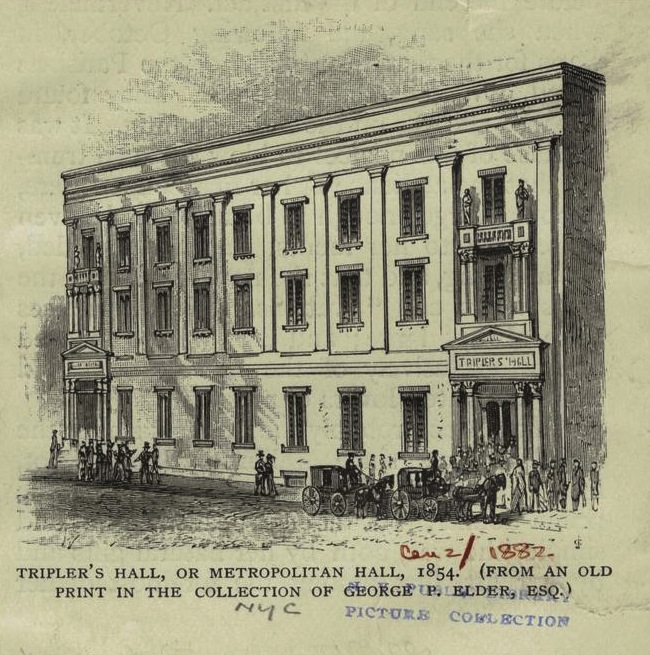
On Mercer Street. The theatre burned to the ground on January 8, 1854 and was replaced by a new theatre structure that same year.

Delays in construction resulted in the theatre not being ready for Miss Lind's first show. She arrived to great fanfare and a reported gathering of over 40,000 (all arranged by her manager, the famed promoter (and later circus founder / owner), Phineas Taylor ("P.T.") Barnum, 1810–1891), and opened at New York City's other famed venue, the Castle Garden theatre. The theatre that was to have opened with "the name of Jenny Lind [that] would attract attention all over the country", was later opened as Tripler Hall (also known later as the Metropolitan Hall). It had productions of numerous minstrel shows, which were fashionable and popular on the American stage in that 19th and early to mid-20th centuries era.

Tripler Hall also was used for other large gatherings. In December 1850 it was the site of an important ceremonial meeting of the Freemasons of New York City, which was attended by thousands of men. It was described as "the event was regarded and still is regarded [1899] as a landmark in the history of Freemasonry in the history of New York."

In February 1852, a memorial service was held at Tripler Hall for James Fenimore Cooper (1789–1851), the renowned American author / novelist. Noted statesman and influential U.S. Senator Daniel Webster (1782–1852), of Massachusetts presided, and eulogies were said by fellow literary figures Washington Irving (1783–1859), and William Cullen Bryant (1794–1878). That same year English author William Thackeray concluded a national tour with a lecture at Tripler Hall.

Several different managers had control during this period, with each manager naming the theatre as he or she pleased. When the theatre was used for the American Art-Union Prizes Distribution, a report in the famed British newspaper, The Illustrated London News in London, England, described the event and the interior of Tripler Hall:

Never – not even on the nights of the "Nightingale" – has the capacity of Tripler Hall been more fully booked than the evening appointed for the distribution of the Art Union prizes. The immense floor (30 feet wider than Kester Hall), the aisles, the galleries before the stage, and beside the doors, were crowded to excess."

On May 15, 1855, new management took over the venue, presenting a musical by John and Morris Barnett called Monsieur Jacques. John Lafarge, owner of the famed Lafarge House which adjoined the theatre, assumed management and renamed it as Metropolitan Hall (a.k.a. as the Metropolitan Concert Hall).

== Laura Keene ==
Laura Keene's Variety Theatre, 1856

On December 27, 1855, the actress and manager Laura Keene reopened the theatre as Laura Keene's Varieties with Old Heads and Young Hearts.

Here the leading female impresario of New York produced an eclectic form of entertainment which she would perfect in subsequent productions such as the musical Seven Sisters five years later.

A rare etching of the interior of the theatre at this time depicts a production by Laura Keene in her theatre; From the point of view of the stage, it depicts what is probably the production of a classical text, with two figures in historical costumes standing downstage close to the footlights. This etching, from the actors' point of view, gives a rare glimpse into theatrical production on the American stage in the pre-Civil War era.

Despite the success of the theatre under Laura Keene, the Panic of 1857 bankrupted the theatre, and it was forced to close once again.

This house was reopened Sept. 8, 1856 as Burton's New Theatre, managed by William Evans Burton, with The Rivals. In 1858, Joseph Jefferson performed in the burlesque Mazeppa by F. A. Brady. He was drawn across the stage atop a Crandall horse.

== Dion Boucicault ==
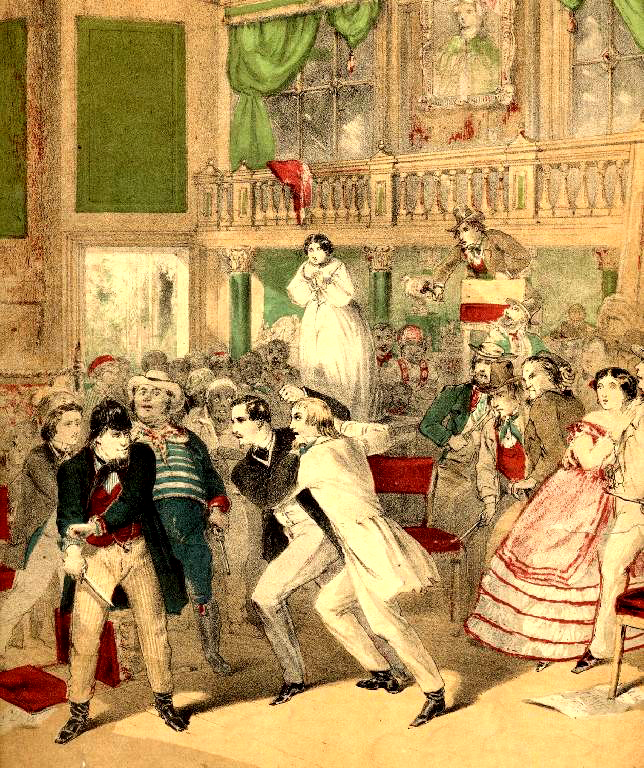
The Octoroon, Act IV, (1859). The premiere of this controversial melodrama became the "sensation" of the entertainment season of 1859. (Compliments of Special Collections, Templeman Library, University of Kent, Kent, England, United Kingdom).

During the summer of 1859, the daring actor–playwright–manager Dion Boucicault (1820–1890), called "the most conspicuous English dramatist of the 19th century", tried his hand at management, took over the theatre, and gave the theatre its final name of The Winter Garden Theatre with the opening of his original burlesque Chamooni III on October 19, 1859. The theatre was aptly named The Winter Garden because Boucicault remodeled the theatre extensively, surprisingly cutting the auditorium in half and installing "artificial tropical plants after a Parisian prototype." Boucicault effectively turned the theatre into a "winter garden" in the fall of the year. Among Boucicault's stable of first-rung actors were Joseph Jefferson (1829–1905), Agnes Kelly Robertson (1833–1916), and Mrs. John Wood (born Matilda Charlotte Vining, 1831–1915). Boucicault's dramatization of Charles Dickens's (1812–1870) Christmas story Cricket on the Hearth was his opening production, starring Jefferson as Caleb Plummer and Robertson as Dot. This immensely popular production eventually toured, as one critic has said, to "every possible playhouse in English-speaking America."

=== The Octoroon ===
That winter, on December 5 of 1859, Boucicault premiered one of his most popular – and controversial – melodramas The Octoroon, subtitled "Life in Louisiana", which he had adapted from the novel The Quadroon by Thomas Mayne Reid (1818–1883). The Octoroon, dealing with people of mixed white and African heritage, caused nothing short of a sensation, to see on the stage a drama that provoked discussions about race and politics. About this new phenomenon, The New York Times wrote that it had become "the great dramatic sensation of the season":

Everybody talks about the Octoroon, [sic] wonders about the Octoroon, goes to see the Octoroon; and the "Octoroon" thus becomes, in point of fact, the work of the public mind...the public having insisted on rewriting the piece according to its own notions, interprets every word and incident in wholly unexpected lights; and, for aught we know, therefore, the "Octoroon" may prove after all to be a political treatise of great emphasis and significance, very much to the author's amazement.

The newly named Winter Garden Theatre eventually became home to a series of musical extravaganzas and burlesques: Cinderella with music by Charles Koppitz and a text by Charles Dawson Shanley on September 9, 1861; The Wizard's Tempest by Charles Gayler, on June 9, 1862; and King Cotton by Charles Chamberlain on June 21, 1862.

== Edwin Booth ==
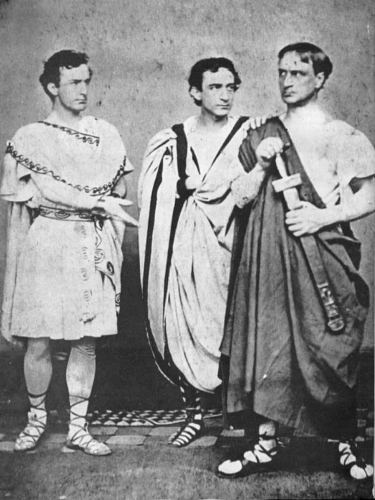
Performing the William Shakespeare play Julius Caesar from the 16th century, at the Winter Garden Theatre, in Manhattan, New York City; with famed acting Booth family brothers: John Wilkes Booth, Edwin Booth, and Junius Brutus Booth Jr., November 25, 1864.

On February 21, 1863, Edwin Booth (1833–1893), took on the management of the Winter Garden Theatre (together with his brother-in-law, John Sleeper Clarke, 1833–1899) with the intention of shifting the focus from musicals and burlesques to classical dramas. This enterprise included a toga-clad, one-night production of Julius Caesar on the evening of November 25, 1864, Evacuation Day holiday (New York City celebration, marking the leaving of the seven years occupying British Army from the town at the end of the American Revolutionary War, after the signing / ratification of the Treaty of Paris earlier in 1783), played by Edwin and his brothers, John Wilkes Booth and Junius Brutus Booth Jr.

The goal of staging the 16th century play Julius Caesar for just one night was to raise funds for the erection of a sculpted bronze statue of William Shakespeare designed by sculptor/artist John Quincy Adams Ward (1830–1910), in the decade-old new Central Park on the northern outskirts (then) of Manhattan. Tickets went for sale for a (then) astounding price of five dollars. Considering the way history was to unfold, it is curious that it was middle brother Edwin Booth who played the role of ancient Roman senator Brutus, assassin of Julius Caesar, and the role of Marc Antony was played by youngest brother John Wilkes Booth, while "lean and hungry" Cassius was given to the heavier built oldest brother Junius Brutus Booth Jr.

In the handbill promoting the production (illustrated at right), it stated that there would appear, for one night only, "The Three Sons of the Great Booth." The three Booth brothers were then listed, from oldest to youngest, Junius, Edwin, and John, and beneath this, the ancient Latin phrase that left no doubt that the entire production was dedicated to their father, the great actor / tragedian Junius Brutus Booth: Filii Patri Digno Digniores.

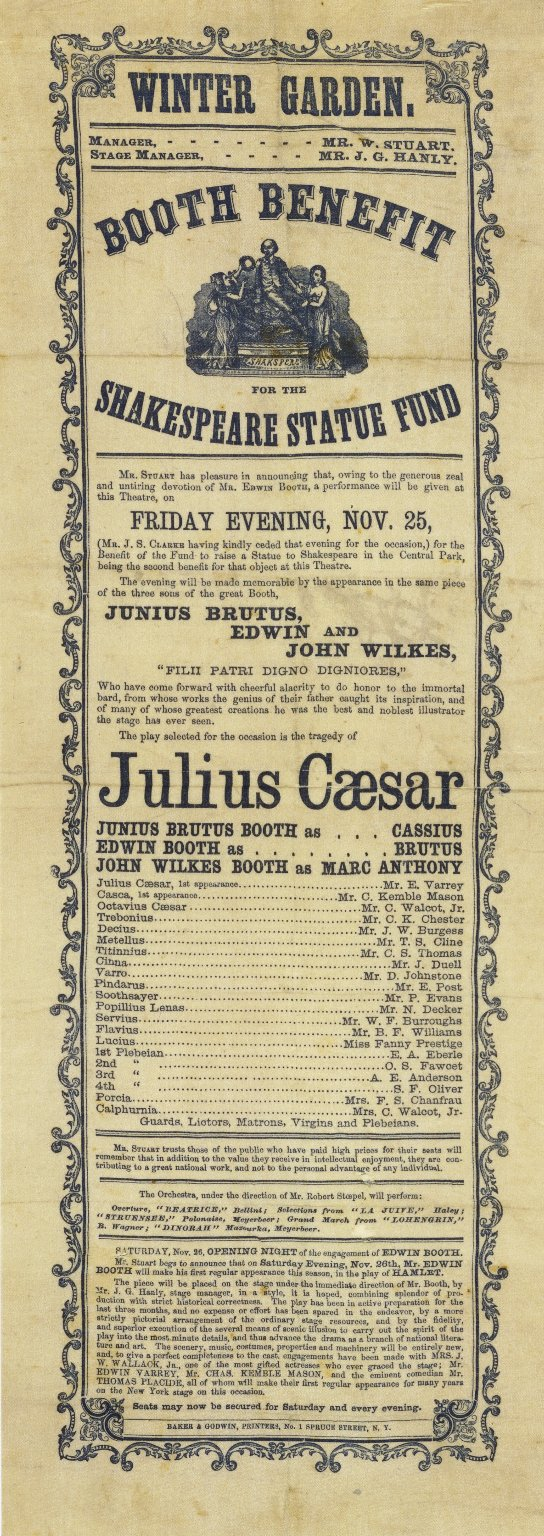
Distributed handbill / poster for the one-night benefit performance of William Shakespeare's 16th century play Julius Caesar at the Winter Garden Theatre, Manhattan, New York City, November 25, 1864, with acting greats of Booth family brothers: Junius Brutus Booth Jr., Edwin Booth, and John Wilkes Booth

As their mother watched on from a box on the aisle, the three Booth brothers reenacted the tragedy of Julius Caesar before an audience in The Winter Garden Theatre that was "packed to the rafters." During the performance the clanging of fire bells could be heard from the streets of New York, as confederate sympathizers during the ongoing American Civil War tried to burn the city to the ground, which included fires set in the Lafarge House, which abutted the rear of The Winter Garden Theatre. About a half-hour into the performance, during the first scene of Act Two, when Brutus was pacing in his orchard, contemplating his pending assassination of Caesar, the clang and clatter of horse-drawn fire engines could be heard from the street outside. It seemed that there was a fire next door in the Lafarge House which threatened to engulf The Winter Garden Theatre. Before panic could consume the audience, Edwin stepped to the footlights to calm the audience.

=== Julius Caesar and the burning of New York City ===
The fire at the Lafarge House that almost spread to the Winter Garden Theatre had been set by sympathizers to the cause of the collapsing southern Confederacy near the end of the American Civil War (1861–1865), with the intention of possibly causing great damage by burning much of New York to the ground during these, the last months of the conflict further south. At the Lafarge House, someone had set fires in the front parlor and had emptied a bottle of phosphorus on the furniture throughout a room on the third floor.

In describing this "diabolical plot to burn the City of New York," which the then 13-year-old daily newspaper The New York Times called "one of the most fiendish and inhuman acts known in modern times," it was reported under a banner heading:

THE EXCITEMENT AT WINTER GARDEN

On November 26, 1864, confederate rebels set fire to the Lafarge House. The house was located next to the Winter Garden Theatre, and the rebels had the intention of spreading the fire and burning down New York. A woman was arrested at the Metropolitan Hotel after witnesses had seen her leaving each building right before they caught on fire. She was suspected of using phosphorus to help start the fires and was detained. The fire marshal Baker was in charge of investigating how the fires were started, while police tracked down other suspected people. The New York Times said that this rebel attempt was "one of the most fiendish and inhuman acts known in modern times."

When the alarm of fire was given at the Lafarge the excitement became very intense among the closely-packed mass of human beings in [the] Winter Garden Theatre adjoining the Lafarge, and but for the presence of mind of Mr. BOOTH, who addressed them from the stage of the theatre, telling them there was no danger, it is fearful to think what would have been the result. There was only the usual number of policemen and watchmen in attendance, and the panic was such for a few moments that it seemed as if all the audience believed the entire building was in flames, and just ready to fall upon their devoted heads. In addition to what Mr. BOOTH said from the stage, Judge McCLUNN rose in the dress circle, and in a few timely remarks admonished them all to remain quietly in their places, and at the same time tried to show them the danger which would attend a pell-mell rush for the doors, and especially the uselessness of it, inasmuch as the theatre part of the building was known to be on fire. The presence of a squad of policemen soon after so reassured the audience that with a few exceptions, they remained until the close of the performance.

The city was saved, as was The Winter Garden Theatre. The production of Julius Caesar proceeded. The production was the first – and only – time that the three sons of one of America's great tragedians, Junius Brutus Booth, performed together on the same stage. The production raised $3,500 for the building of the statue of Shakespeare in Central Park, which stands there today.

=== The "Hundred Nights Hamlet" ===
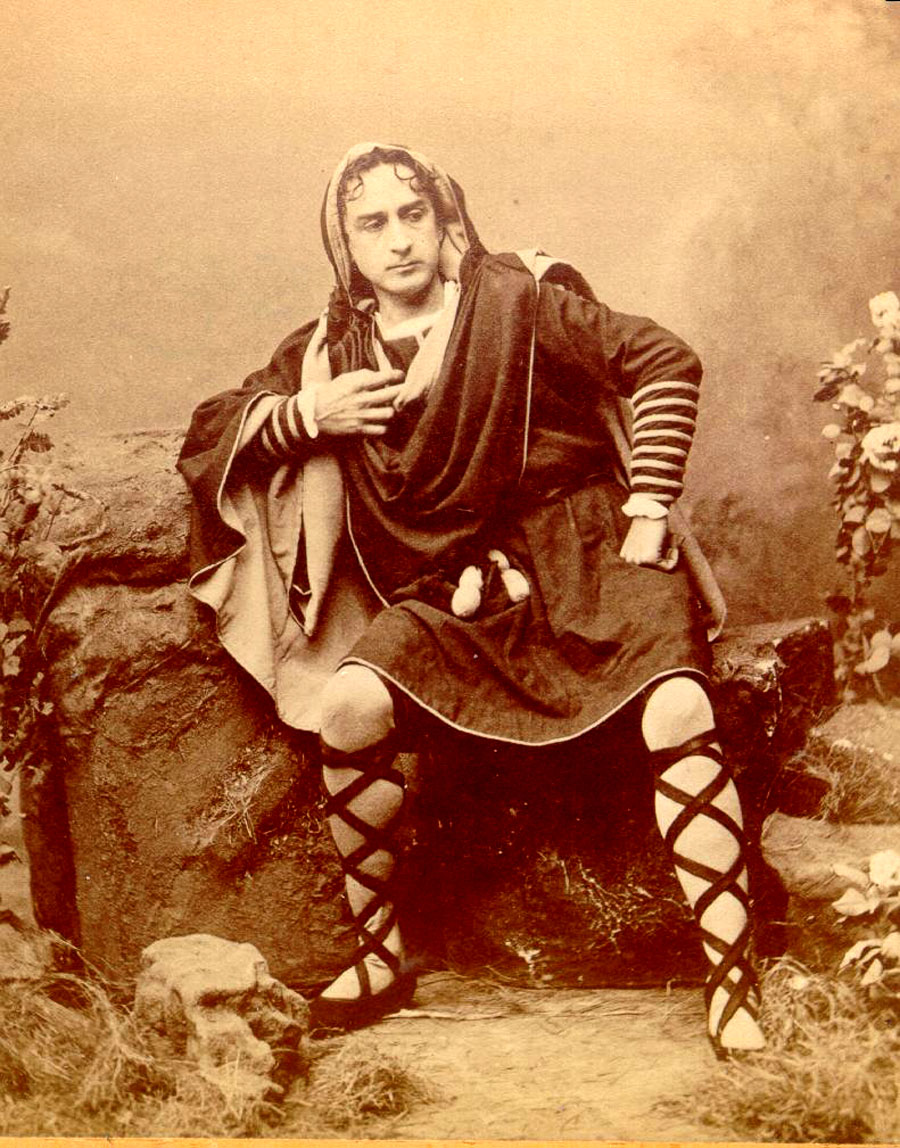
Edwin Booth as Hamlet at the Winter Garden Theatre, 1864

The following night, on November 26, 1864, Booth played the lead role in what became known as the "100 nights Hamlet", a record which stood for 56 years, until John Barrymore's Hamlet role in 1920 (of another famous acting family, the Barrymore-Drew family).

The Hamlet of Edwin Booth is well documented in reviews and diaries of those who saw the production. One review, appearing in Harper's magazine shortly after the run of "the hundred nights Hamlet" summarized what Edwin Booth had accomplished during this important portrayal – a production which, perhaps more than any other single production in American stage history, solidified one of the great roles in dramatic history with a single actor. As a critic from the era then wrote: "A really fine actor is as uncommon as a really great dramatic poet. Yet what Garrick was in Richard III or Edmund Kean in Shylock, we are sure Edwin Booth is in Hamlet."

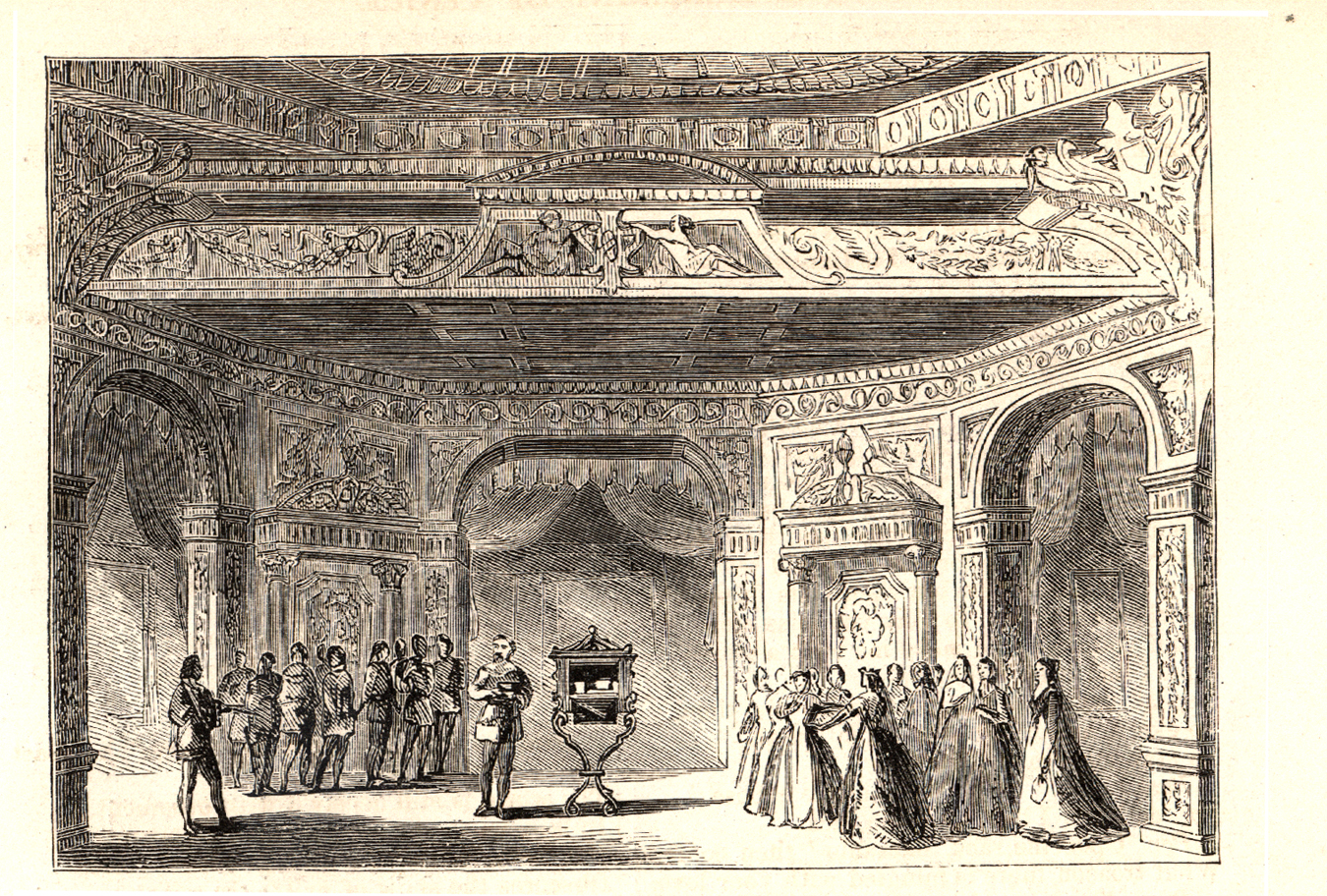
Set design for Edwin Booth's famous acclaimed production of the Merchant of Venice, of Act IV, Scene 1, An Apartment in Portia's House, January 1867, by Charles Witham.

After that, Booth followed his Hamlet marathon on March 23, 1865, with a series of what he called "Grand Revivals": a series of classical dramas sumptuously produced at the Winter Garden playhouse that began with a highly acclaimed production of Othello, with Booth (as usual) in the title role.

After President Lincoln's assassination on April 14, 1865, older brother Edwin Booth went int a self-imposed retirement and privately asked successor 17th President Andrew Johnson for his younger brother's body remains and had him quietly buried at the Booth family plot at the historic Green Mount Cemetery in Baltimore, in an unmarked grave later that year of 1865.

Finally, ten months later in February 1866, he returned to the stage and played his acclaimed character of Richelieu, followed in January 1867 by a spectacular production of the Merchant of Venice that was considered one of the finest productions of that play during the 19th century.

== Demise ==
On Saturday, March 23, 1867, a fire broke out under the stage which eventually burned the Winter Garden Theatre to the ground.

A fire broke out about 8:40 o'clock on Saturday morning beneath the stage of the Winter Garden Theatre, resulting in the entire destruction of that establishment, and doing considerable damage to the Southern Hotel, formerly known as the Lafarge House. Although the Fire Department was promptly on hand, in an incredibly short space of time the flames had wrapped the entire interior of the Winter Garden in a sheet of fire, and the firemen were unable to work therein owing to the intense heat...By 9 o'clock the flames had reached their limit and the spectacle was one of peculiar grandeur and effect...At 9:15 the roof of theatre fell...The aggregate loss is roughly estimated at $250,000. Both the theatre and the hotel are owned by the Lafarge estate, as also the "stock" scenery and properties of the former...Messrs. EDWIN BOOTH and W. STUART also suffer severe losses. These gentlemen were the joint lessees and managers of the Winter Garden, and their extensive and valuable wardrobes, used in the recent Shakespearean revivals, as well as a large amount of new scenery and properties, were all destroyed by the flames. These articles were valued at $60,000 and uninsured...Mr. Booth is a heavy loser by the total destruction of his private wardrobe and many valuable presents. This wardrobe was considered to be the most extensive and valuable one in the possession of any single actor on this continent.

Included in the wardrobe and also lost was Edwin Booth's famous Hamlet costume. Rather than rebuild the theatre once again, Booth decided to erect his own theatre twenty blocks uptown on newly fashionable West Twenty-Third Street on the corner of Sixth Avenue, to be called Booth's Theatre.

The site was then occupied by the Grand Central Hotel, and is today the location for the New York University School of Law's Mercer Street Residence.

== Names ==
667 Broadway
| As of | Name | Managers | Source page |
|---|---|---|---|
| October 17, 1850 | Tripler Hall | N/A | 424 |
| December 1851 | Metropolitan Hall | N/A | 425 |
| January 8, 1854 | [destroyed by fire] | N/A | 426 |
| September 18, 1854 | New York Theatre and Metropolitan Opera House | N/A | 426 |
| September 30, 1854 | Great Metropolitan Theatre | N/A | 427 |
| September 3, 1855 | The Metropolitan | N/A | 429 |
| December 27, 1855 | Laura Keene's Varieties | Laura Keene | 431-2 |
| September 8, 1856 | Burton's New Theatre | William Burton | 435 |
| April 4, 1859 | The New Metropolitan | N/A | 445 |
| September 14, 1859 | Winter Garden Theatre | Dion Boucicault and Edwin Booth | 446 |
| March 23, 1867 | [destroyed by fire] | N/A | 467 |

== See also ==
- Winter Garden Theatre – the current theatre
