= Asia Booth Clarke =

American writer (1835–1888)

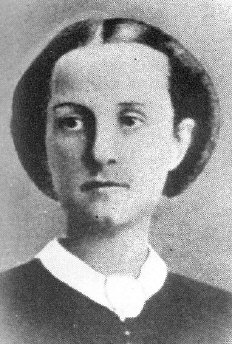
- Booth Clarke in the 1850s
- Born: Asia Frigga Booth; November 19, 1835; Bel Air, Harford, Maryland, U.S.
- Died: May 16, 1888 (aged 52); Bournemouth, Hampshire, England
- Occupations: Essayist; memoirist; poet
- Spouse: John Sleeper Clarke (m. 1859)
- Children: 8
- Parent: Junius Brutus Booth
- Relatives: Junius Brutus Booth Jr. (brother); Edwin Thomas Booth (brother); John Wilkes Booth (brother); Edwina Booth Grossman (niece)
- Family: Booth family

Asia Frigga Booth Clarke (November 19, 1835 – May 16, 1888) was a 19th-century American writer.

== Early years ==
Asia Frigga Booth was the eighth in the family of ten children born to Junius Brutus Booth and his wife Mary Ann Holmes. Her famous brothers were Junius Brutus Booth Jr., Edwin Thomas Booth, and John Wilkes Booth (who later became the assassin of U.S. President Abraham Lincoln). Originally, her father, who admired all religions equally, had wished to name her "Ayesha" after Muhammad's wife, or "Frigga" after the Norse goddess, because she was born on a Friday. Aged two, she finally received the name "Asia". Asia was named for the continent where her father thought the Garden of Eden had been located.

== Career ==
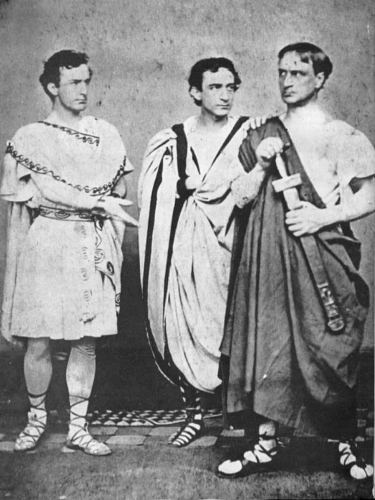
Left to right: Asia's brothers, John, Edwin, and Junius Jr. in Julius Caesar

On April 28, 1859, Asia married John Sleeper Clarke at St. Paul's Episcopal Church, in Baltimore, Maryland. The couple had eight children, two of whom, Creston (1865–1910) and Wilfred (1867–1945), became actors. Wilfred would later marry actress Victory Bateman.

Because the assassination of Abraham Lincoln in 1865 was committed by her brother, John Wilkes Booth, she and her husband emigrated to England, where they stayed until the end of their lives. Asia became a poet and writer, and through her work some insight was gained into the lives of the Booths, particularly John Wilkes. The Unlocked Book: John Wilkes Booth, a Sister's Memoir was written in 1874, but she kept its existence secret, fearing it would upset her husband. He had been imprisoned and forced to testify at the Lincoln assassination co-conspirators' trials, because of his family connection.

The memoir was published in 1938 by G. P. Putnam's Sons, when her heirs felt the public would be receptive. It was re-edited and republished in 1996 as John Wilkes Booth: A Sister's Memoir. Her other family memoirs, which she was able to publish during her lifetime, focused on the acting careers of her father and her brother Edwin Booth. The first, titled Booth memorials: Passages, incidents, and anecdotes in the life of Junius Brutus Booth (the Elder) by His Daughter, was published in December 1865, within a year of Lincoln's assassination.

Asia Booth Clarke is buried in the family plot at Greenmount Cemetery in Baltimore.

== Selected works ==
- The Unlocked Book: John Wilkes Booth, a Sister's Memoir. 1938.
- Personal Recollections of the Elder Booth. privately printed. 1902.
- The Elder and the Younger Booth. Boston: J.R. Osgood. 1881.
- Booth Memorials: Passages, Incidents, and Anecdotes in the Life of Junius Brutus Booth (the Elder.). New York: Carleton. 1866.

== See also ==
- List of show business families
