= Edwina Booth Grossman =

American writer (1861–1938)

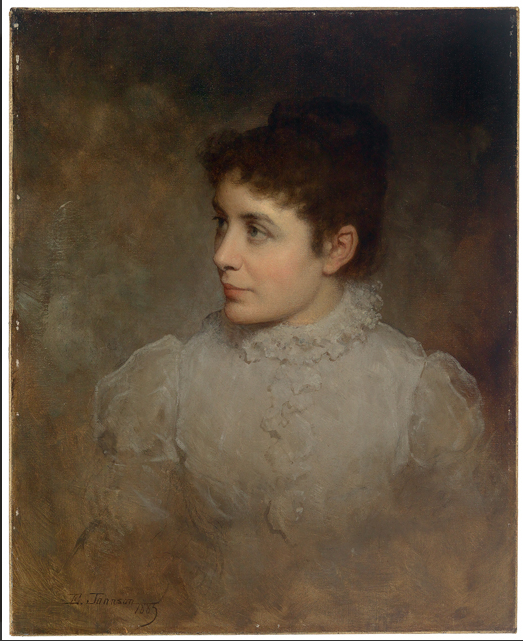
- Oil portrait of Edwina Booth Grossman by Eastman Johnson, 1885
- Born: Edwina Booth; December 9, 1861
- Died: December 26, 1938 (aged 77)
- Notable work: Edwin Booth: Recollections by His Daughter, Edwina Booth Grossman, and Letters to Her and to His Friends (1894)
- Spouse: Ignatius R. Grossman (m. 1885)
- Children: 2
- Relatives: Edwin Booth (father); John Wilkes Booth (uncle); Junius Brutus Booth Jr. (uncle); Asia Booth Clarke (aunt); Junius Brutus Booth (grandfather)
- Family: Booth family

Edwina Booth Grossman (December 9, 1861 – December 26, 1938) was an American writer and the daughter of Shakespearean actor Edwin Booth. In 1894, she published the book Edwin Booth: Recollections by His Daughter, Edwina Booth Grossman, and Letters to Her and to His Friends in an effort to protect her father's legacy after the 1865 assassination of Abraham Lincoln by her uncle, John Wilkes Booth.

== Early life and education ==
Grossman was born Edwina Booth on December 9, 1861.

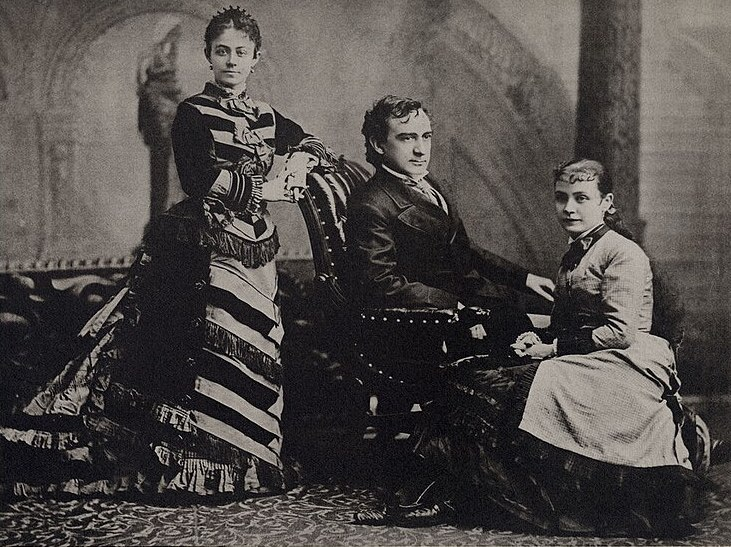
Mary McVicker Booth, Edwin Booth, and Edwina Booth (right)

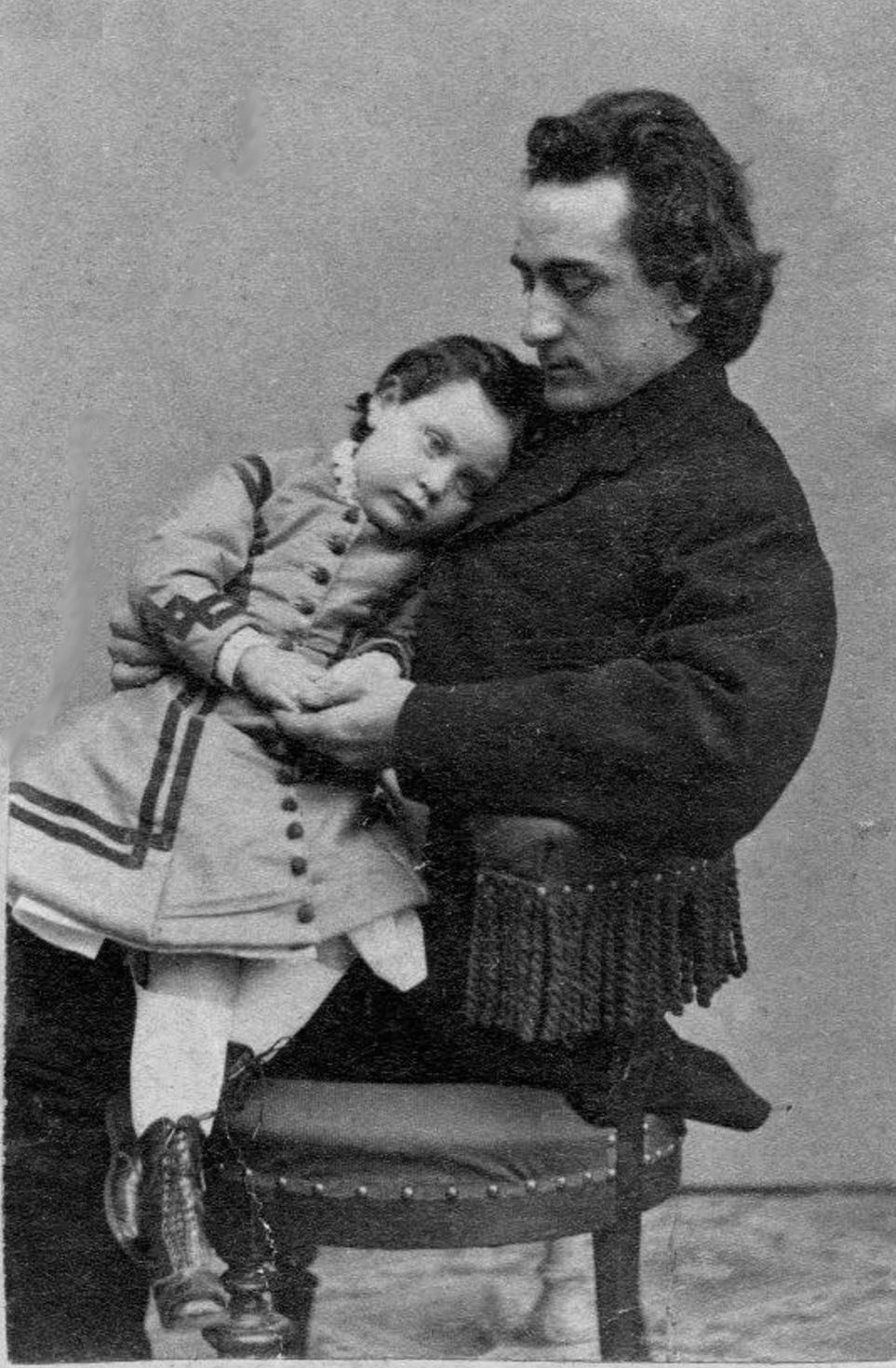
Edwina Booth Grossman as a child in the lap of her father, Edwin Booth, c. 1864

Members of the prominent Booth family, Grossman's parents, Edwin Booth and Mary Devlin Booth, were well-known Shakespearian actors. Grossman's paternal grandfather was Junius Brutus Booth and John Wilkes Booth was her paternal uncle. Mary Devlin Booth died in 1863, when Grossman was two years old. Edwin Booth married actress Mary McVicker in 1869.

== Career ==
In 1894, Grossman published a book about her father, Edwin Booth, reportedly concerned that his legacy as an actor would be marred by his brother's assassination of Abraham Lincoln in 1865. The volume was titled Edwin Booth: Recollections by His Daughter, Edwina Booth Grossman, and Letters to Her and to His Friends. As the title suggests, the book describes Grossman's memories of her father and contains edited transcripts of letters written by him.

== Private life ==
On May 16, 1885, Edwina Booth married banker Ignatius R. Grossman (sometimes spelled "Crossman"). The couple had two children, Clarence Edwin Booth Grossman, who became an artist, and Mildred Booth Grossman. Grossman's granddaughter, Edwina Booth Waterbury, eventually married actor Richard H. Cutting.

Grossman was reportedly at her father's side at the time of his death in June 1893.

Edwina Booth Grossman died on December 26, 1938.
