= Mary McVicker Booth =

American actress

Mary Frances McVicker
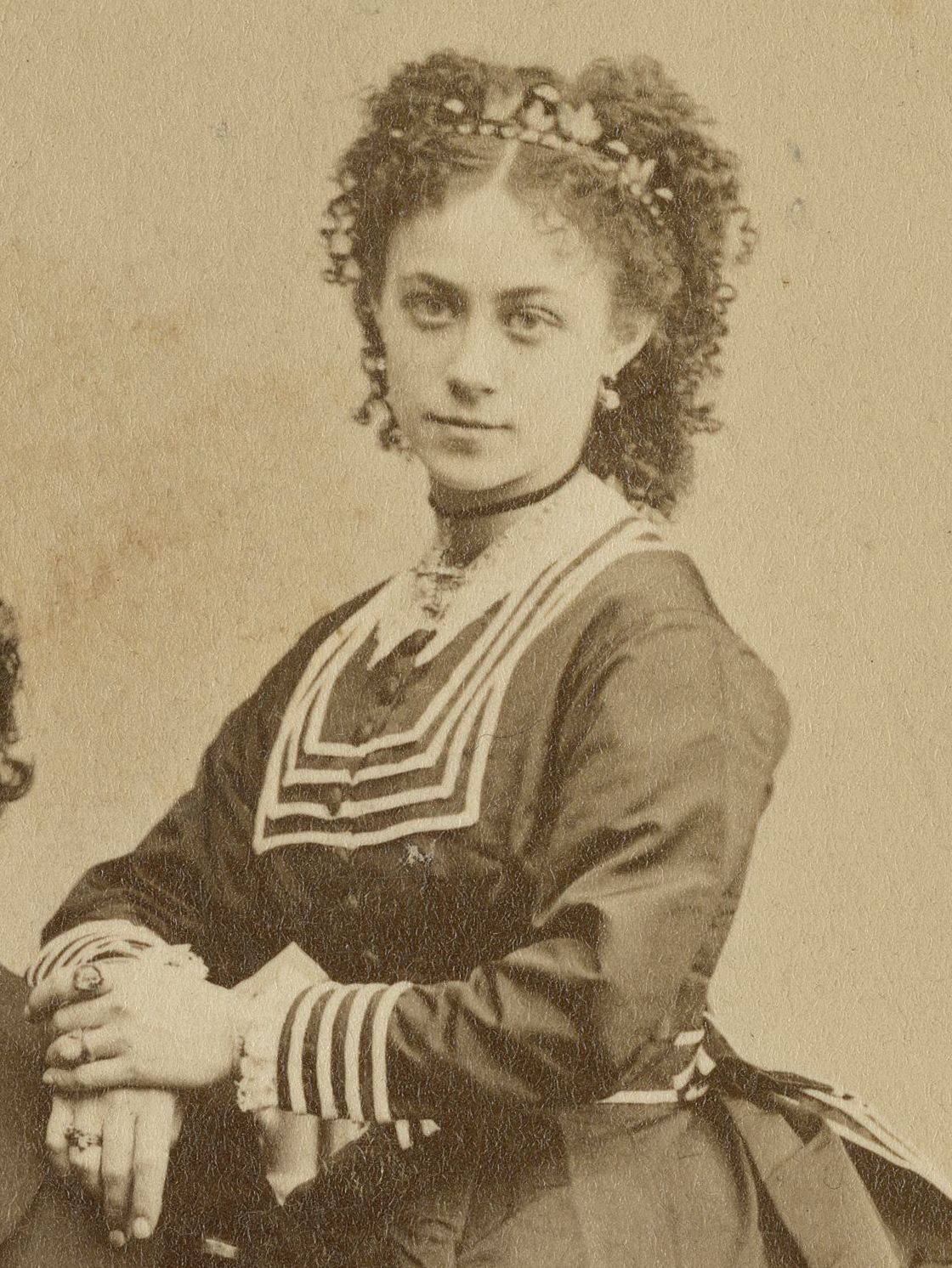
- Born: May Frances Runnion; September 17, 1848
- Died: November 13, 1881 (aged 33)
- Occupations: Actress, singer
- Spouse: Edwin Booth (m. 1869)

Mary Frances McVicker (born Mary Frances Runnion, also known as Mary McVicker Booth; September 17, 1848 – November 13, 1881) was an American stage actress and singer perhaps best known for her partnership with actor Edwin Booth, to whom she was married.

== Biography ==
Mary Frances Runnion was born on September 17, 1848. Her mother was Harriet G. Myers Weaver Runnion. Her stepfather, J.H. McVicker, was a prominent theatre owner in the Midwest. McVicker made her stage debut in one of her stepfather's theatres in 1858. She later received positive critical attention for her performance as Eva in Uncle Tom's Cabin. She performed in other productions, some of which were written for her. She performed material from Hamlet. She was known for her singing; she performed with Signor Brignoli. She also did imitations of Italian opera singers and the popular French actress Rachel. McVicker left the stage to attend school when she was thirteen years old.

Author Arthur W. Bloom describes McVicker as "witty, sharp-tongued, domineering, physically strong, an astute businesswoman and eventually, perhaps always, mentally ill".

McVicker first met Edwin Booth, an established stage actor from the Booth family, when she was nine years old; she danced for him at dinner. Booth was fourteen years her senior. McVicker encountered Booth again in 1867 when she was an adult; this was only a few years after his brother, John Wilkes Booth, had assassinated President Abraham Lincoln. McVicker and Booth worked together in a number of productions over the next few years. They played the title characters in Romeo and Juliet in 1869 in the inaugural performance at Booth's Theatre in New York City; one reviewer wrote, "the Juliet of Miss McVicker was a very creditable performance". McVicker played Desdemona opposite Booth in the title role of Othello in April 1869; this production was poorly received, with one reviewer writing that McVicker "dresses nicely, looks nicely, sings quite nicely, and doesn't act at all".

They lived together for over a year before their marriage and they moved to New York together. McVicker and Booth were married by her grandfather in June 1869 at her parents' summer home in Long Branch, New Jersey.

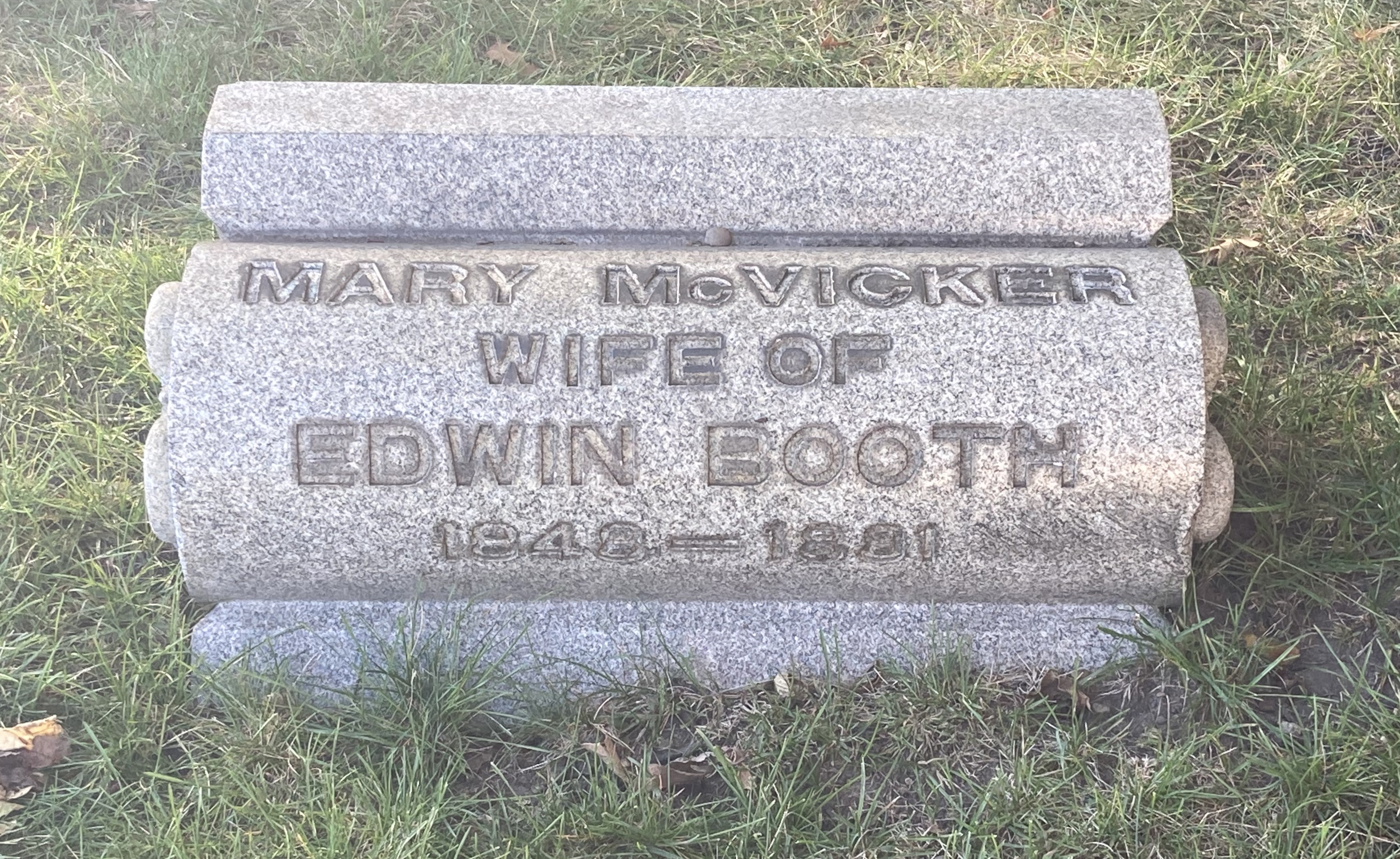
Booth's grave at Rosehill Cemetery

Her career as an actress ended with the 1869 season; she worked managing Edwin and his daughter from his previous marriage, Edwina. They lived in Cos Cob, Connecticut, at a home called Cedar Cliff. Their son, Edgar, died shortly after birth in 1870; a subsequent pregnancy ended in miscarriage. Following the loss of Edgar, McVicker suffered from mental and physical illness for the rest of her life. She contracted tuberculosis.

McVicker died in New York following her return from a trip to Europe on November 13, 1881; on her husband's birthday. A memorial service held at St. Paul's Universalist Church in Chicago was led by Dr. W.H. Ryder and Professor David Swing. She was buried at Rosehill Cemetery in Chicago.

== Legacy ==
A portrait of McVicker is held at the National Portrait Gallery.

McVicker appears as a character in Angela Iannone's play This Prison Where I Live.
