= Junius Brutus Booth Jr. =

American actor and manager (1821–1883)

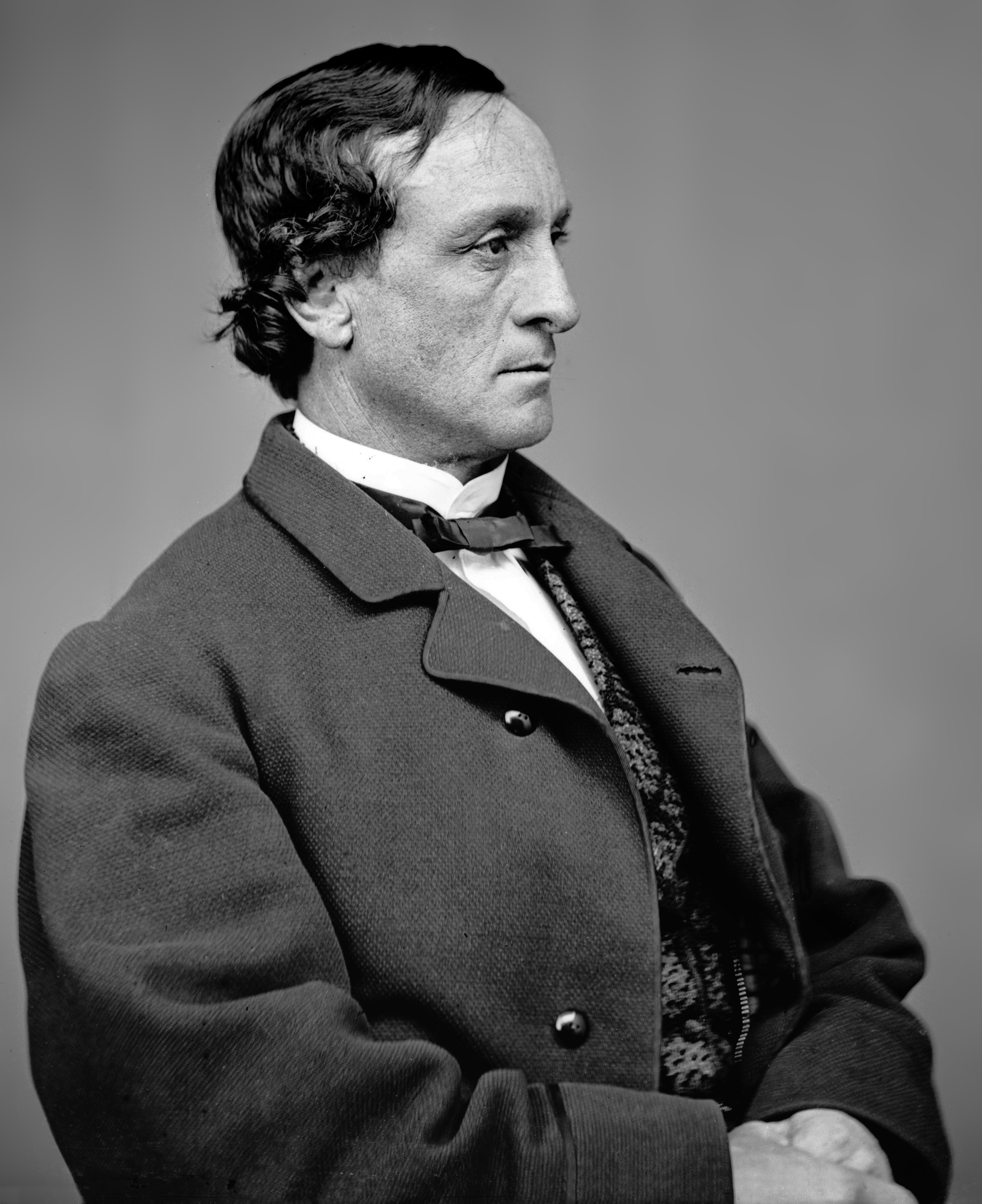
- Booth, c. 1855–1865
- Born: December 22, 1821; Charleston, South Carolina, U.S.
- Died: September 17, 1883 (aged 61); Manchester-by-the-Sea, Massachusetts, U.S.
- Occupations: Actor, theatre manager
- Spouses: Clementine DeBar (m. 1845, divorced) Harriet Mace (m. 1851; died 1859) Agnes Perry (m. 1867)
- Children: 5
- Parent(s): Junius Brutus Booth; Mary Ann Holmes
- Relatives: John Wilkes Booth (brother); Edwin Booth (brother); Asia Booth Clarke (sister); Edwina Booth Grossman (niece)
- Family: Booth family

Signature
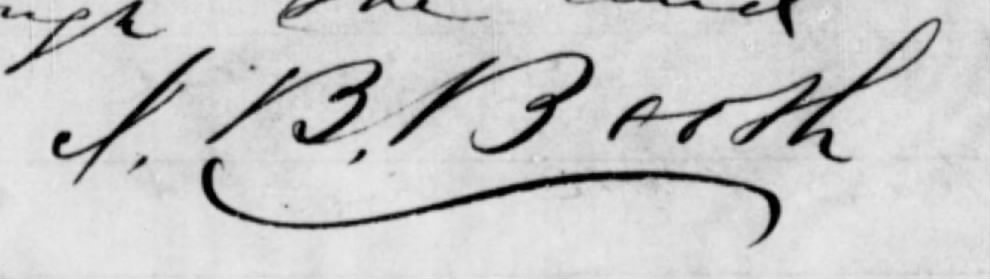

Junius Brutus Booth Jr. (December 22, 1821 – September 17, 1883) was an American actor and theatre manager.

== Biography ==
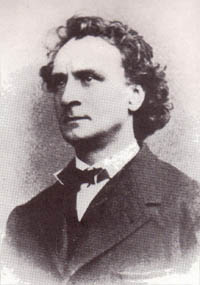
Booth, c. 1865

As a member of the Booth family of actors, Junius Brutus Booth Jr. was overshadowed by his father Junius Sr. and brothers Edwin and John Wilkes (the assassin of Abraham Lincoln) and later by his wife Agnes, a successful actress.

Booth was married three times. His first marriage was to Clementine DeBar, sister of comedian and theatrical manager Ben DeBar; the marriage ended in divorce. He then married actress Harriet Mace (1833-1859), who performed first in Boston with Junius on July 21, 1851, on the steamer Tennessee from Panama with three others from their troupe to perform at the new Pacific Theatre as announced on August 20, 1851, in Sacramento. Harriet Booth died from complications in childbirth in August 1859. His third marriage, upon returning East in 1867 and becoming manager of The Boston Theatre, was to Agnes Perry (née Rookes), who thereafter was known professionally as Agnes Booth.

Booth had five children in total. A daughter Marion Rosalie Edwina (1859–1932) from his second marriage and four sons from his third marriage, of whom two survived to adulthood: Junius Brutus III (1868–1912; died by suicide), Algernon (1869–1877), Sydney Barton (1873–1937), and Barton J. (1874–1879). It is disputed whether Blanche De Bar Booth (1844–1930), the daughter of his first wife Clementine, was his daughter as she was born before their marriage.

Booth managed the Boston Theatre, Walnut Street Theatre, Winter Garden Theatre, and Booth's Theatre, where his brother Edwin was the star attraction. Junius Jr. was highly regarded for his performances as King John and as Cassius in Julius Caesar. In 1864 he performed Julius Caesar alongside his brothers Edwin (as Brutus) and John Wilkes (as Mark Antony).

Junius Brutus Booth Jr. himself was briefly imprisoned in Washington, D.C., after his brother assassinated Abraham Lincoln. At the time of the assassination, he was fulfilling an acting engagement at Pike's Opera House in Cincinnati. Booth left Cincinnati by train on April 17 and arrived in Philadelphia on April 19. Booth notified the U.S. Marshal of his presence in the city and was arrested and hurried by train to the Old Capitol Prison, where he was interrogated and released.

Booth retired in 1881 to Masconomo House in Manchester-by-the-Sea, Massachusetts, where he died on September 17, 1883. He was buried in Manchester's Rosedale Cemetery. Although Agnes Booth remarried in 1885, she continued performing under the Booth name and was buried next to him when she died in 1910.
