= Edwin Booth =

American actor (1833–1893)

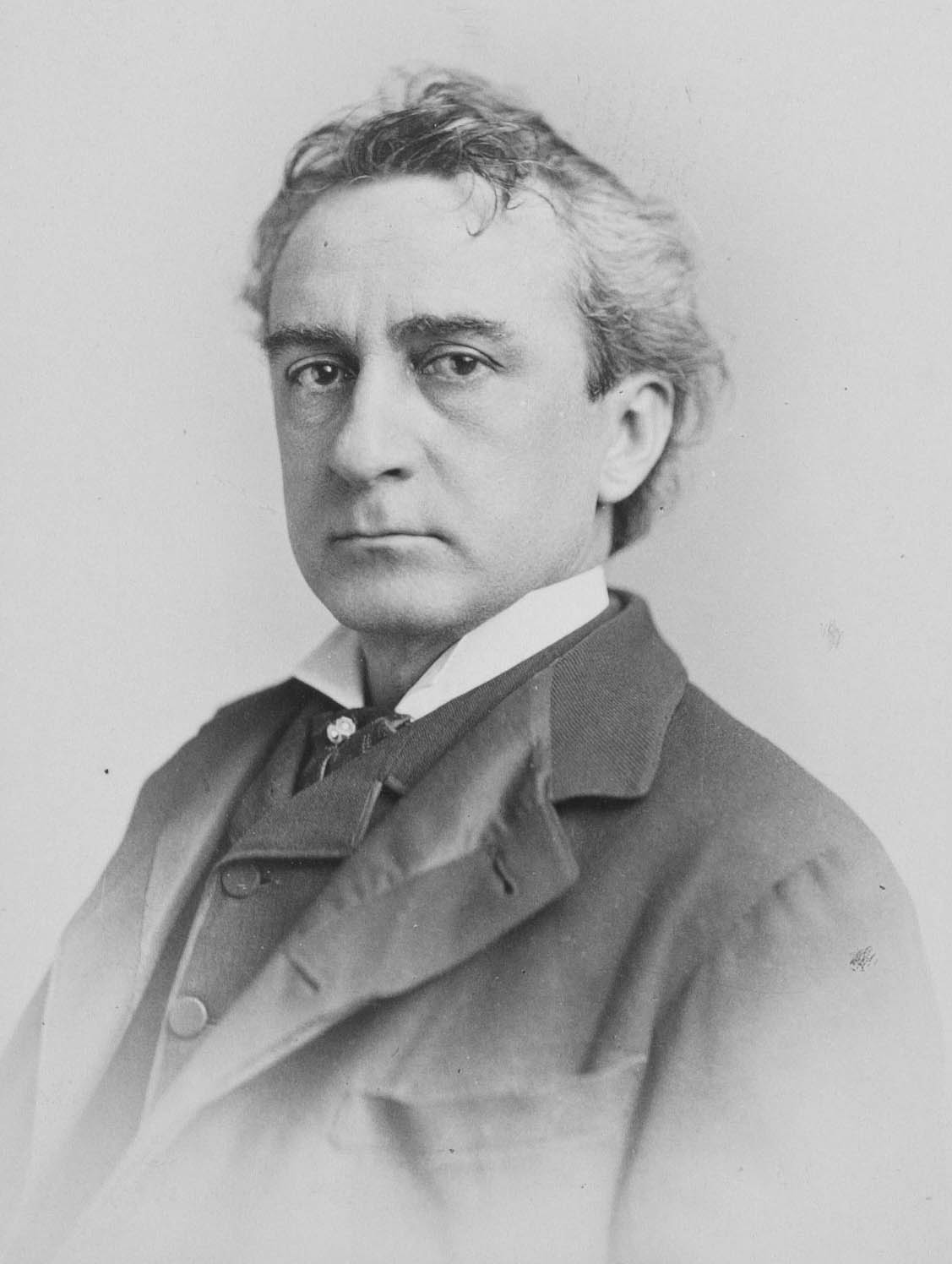
- Booth, c. 1886
- Born: Edwin Thomas Booth; November 13, 1833; Bel Air, Maryland, U.S.
- Died: June 7, 1893 (aged 59); New York City, U.S.
- Resting place: Mount Auburn Cemetery; Cambridge, Massachusetts
- Other name: "The Master"
- Occupation: Actor
- Spouses: Mary Devlin (m. 1860; died 1863) Mary McVicker (m. 1869; died 1881)
- Children: 2, including Edwina
- Parents: Junius Brutus Booth (father); Mary Ann Holmes (mother)
- Relatives: John Wilkes Booth (brother); Junius Brutus Booth Jr. (brother); Asia Booth Clarke (sister)
- Family: Booth family

Edwin Thomas Booth (November 13, 1833 – June 7, 1893) was an American stage actor and theatrical manager who toured throughout the United States and the major capitals of Europe, performing Shakespearean plays. In 1869, he founded Booth's Theatre in New York. He is considered by many to be the greatest American actor of the 19th century. However, his achievements are often overshadowed in modern discourse by his relationship with his younger brother, actor John Wilkes Booth, who assassinated the 16th president of the United States, Abraham Lincoln.

== Early life ==
Booth was born in Bel Air, Maryland, into the Anglo-American theatrical Booth family. He was the son of the famous actor Junius Brutus Booth, an Englishman, and his mistress (later wife) Mary Ann Holmes. He was named after Edwin Forrest and Thomas Flynn, two of Junius' colleagues. He was the younger brother of Junius Brutus Booth Jr. and the elder brother of John Wilkes Booth.

Nora Titone, in her book My Thoughts Be Bloody, recounts how the shame and ambition of Junius Brutus Booth's three actor sons, Junius Jr. (who never achieved the level of stardom of his younger brothers), Edwin, and John Wilkes, spurred them to strive, as rivals, for achievement and acclaim. Politically Edwin was a Unionist; John supported the Confederacy and later became notorious as the assassin of President Abraham Lincoln.

Junius Brutus Booth was "famously peculiar ... . Several sons succeeded him in his career ... and his idiosyncrasies: Edwin had an abiding fear of ivy vines and peacock feathers."

== Career ==
In early appearances, Booth usually performed alongside his father, making his stage debut as Tressel or Tressil in Colley Cibber's version of Richard III in Boston on September 10, 1849. His first appearance in New York City was in the character of Wilford in The Iron Chest, which he played at the National Theatre in Chatham Street, on September 27, 1850. A year later, on the illness of the father, the son took his place in the character of Richard III.

After his father's death in 1852, Booth went on a worldwide tour, visiting Australia and Hawaii, and finally gaining acclaim of his own during an engagement in Sacramento, California, in 1856.

Before his brother assassinated Lincoln, Edwin had appeared with his two brothers, John Wilkes and Junius Brutus Booth Jr., in Julius Caesar in 1864. John Wilkes played Marc Antony, Edwin played Brutus, and Junius played Cassius. It was a benefit performance, and the only time that the three brothers appeared together on the same stage. The funds were used to erect a statue of William Shakespeare that still stands in Central Park just south of the Promenade. Immediately afterwards, Edwin Booth began a production of Hamlet on the same stage, which came to be known as the "hundred nights Hamlet", setting a record that lasted until John Barrymore broke the record in 1922, playing the title character for 101 performances.

From 1863 to 1867, Booth managed the Winter Garden Theatre in New York City, mostly staging Shakespearean tragedies. In 1863, he bought the Walnut Street Theatre in Philadelphia.

After John Wilkes Booth's assassination of President Lincoln in April 1865, the infamy associated with the Booth name forced Edwin Booth to abandon the stage for many months. Edwin, who supported the Union and had been feuding with his pro-Confederate brother John before the assassination, disowned him afterward, refusing to have John's name spoken in his house. Shortly after John's death, Edwin wrote to his sister Asia, "Think no more of him as your brother; he is dead to us now, as he soon must be to all the world, but imagine the boy you loved to be in that better part of his spirit, in another world." He made his return to the stage at the Winter Garden Theatre in January 1866, playing the title role in Hamlet, which would eventually become his signature role.

In 1874, he played the titular role in Othello in Chicago, trading off with James O'Neill. Casting O'Neill, an Irish American actor who was called Black Irish because of his black hair, has been marked as one possible origin of disputes about whether the character Othello was meant to merely have black hair and swarthy skin, rather than to be of sub-Saharan African origin.

Booth was accomplished in many roles. In May 1876, while on tour in Toronto, Canada, he performed as Hamlet, Claude Melnotte in The Lady of Lyons, as Richard II, as Cardinal Richelieu in Richelieu, Shylock in The Merchant of Venice, Benedick in Much Ado About Nothing and as Othello on consecutive days at the Grand Opera House.

== Later life ==
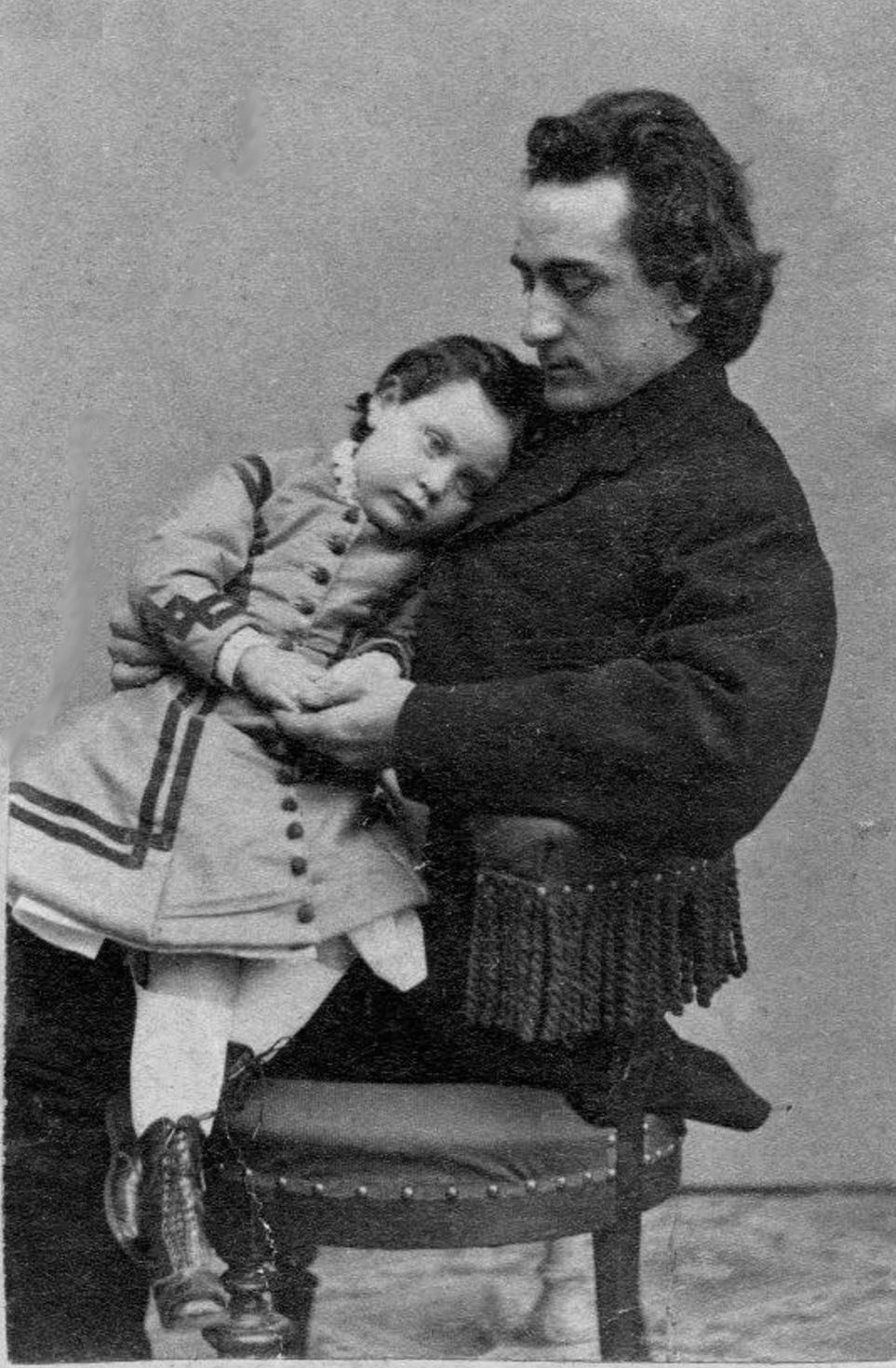
Booth with his daughter Edwina, c. 1864

Booth was married to Mary Devlin Booth from 1860 until her death in 1863. They had one daughter, Edwina, born on December 9, 1861, in London. He later remarried, to his acting partner Mary McVicker Booth in 1869. Their only child, a son named Edgar, died shortly after birth. Booth became a widower again in 1881.

In 1869, Edwin acquired his brother John's body after repeatedly writing to President Andrew Johnson pleading for it. Johnson finally released the remains, and Edwin had them buried, unmarked, in the family plot at Green Mount Cemetery in Baltimore.

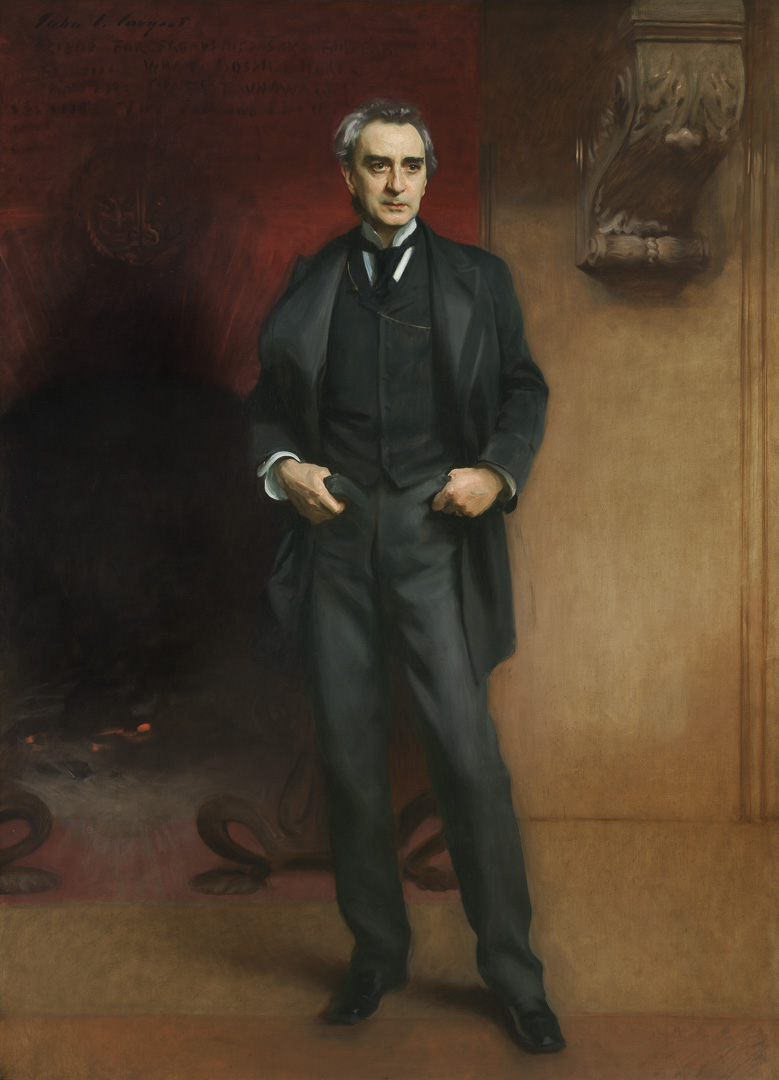
Portrait of Booth by John Singer Sargent, 1890

On April 23, 1879, Mark Gray, a traveling salesman from Keokuk, Iowa, fired two shots from a pistol at Booth. Booth was playing the title role in Richard II at McVicker's Theatre in Chicago, Illinois, during the final act of the William Shakespeare tragedy. Gray gave as his motive a wrong done to a friend by Booth. Gray's shots, which were fired from a distance of thirty-four feet, missed Booth, burying themselves in the stage floor. The would-be assassin was jailed at Central Station in Chicago. Booth was not acquainted with Gray, who worked for a St. Louis, Missouri dry goods firm. A letter to a woman in Ohio was found on Gray's person. The correspondence affirmed Gray's intent to murder Booth. The attempted assassination occurred on Shakespeare's supposed birthday and came at a time when Booth was receiving numerous death threats by mail.

In 1888, Booth founded The Players, a private club for performing, literary, and visual artists and their supporters, purchasing and furnishing a home on Gramercy Park as its clubhouse.

His final performance was, fittingly, in his signature role of Hamlet, in 1891 at the Brooklyn Academy of Music.

=== Robert Lincoln rescue ===
Edwin Booth saved Abraham Lincoln's son, Robert Todd Lincoln, from serious injury or even death. The incident occurred on a train platform in Jersey City, New Jersey. The exact date of the incident is uncertain, but it is believed to have taken place in late 1863 or early 1864. Robert Lincoln recalled the incident in a 1909 letter to Richard Watson Gilder, editor of The Century Magazine.

The incident occurred while a group of passengers were late at night purchasing their sleeping car places from the conductor who stood on the station platform at the entrance of the car. The platform was about the height of the car floor, and there was of course a narrow space between the platform and the car body. There was some crowding, and I happened to be pressed by it against the car body while waiting my turn. In this situation the train began to move, and by the motion I was twisted off my feet, and had dropped somewhat, with feet downward, into the open space, and was personally helpless, when my coat collar was vigorously seized and I was quickly pulled up and out to a secure footing on the platform. Upon turning to thank my rescuer I saw it was Edwin Booth, whose face was of course well known to me, and I expressed my gratitude to him, and in doing so, called him by name.

Booth did not know the identity of the man whose life he had saved until some months later, when he received a letter from a friend, Colonel Adam Badeau, who was an officer on the staff of General Ulysses S. Grant. Badeau had heard the story from Robert Lincoln, who had since joined the Union Army and was also serving on Grant's staff. In the letter, Badeau gave his compliments to Booth for the heroic deed. The fact that he had saved the life of Abraham Lincoln's son was said to have been of some comfort to Edwin Booth following his brother's assassination of the president.

=== Booth's Theatre ===
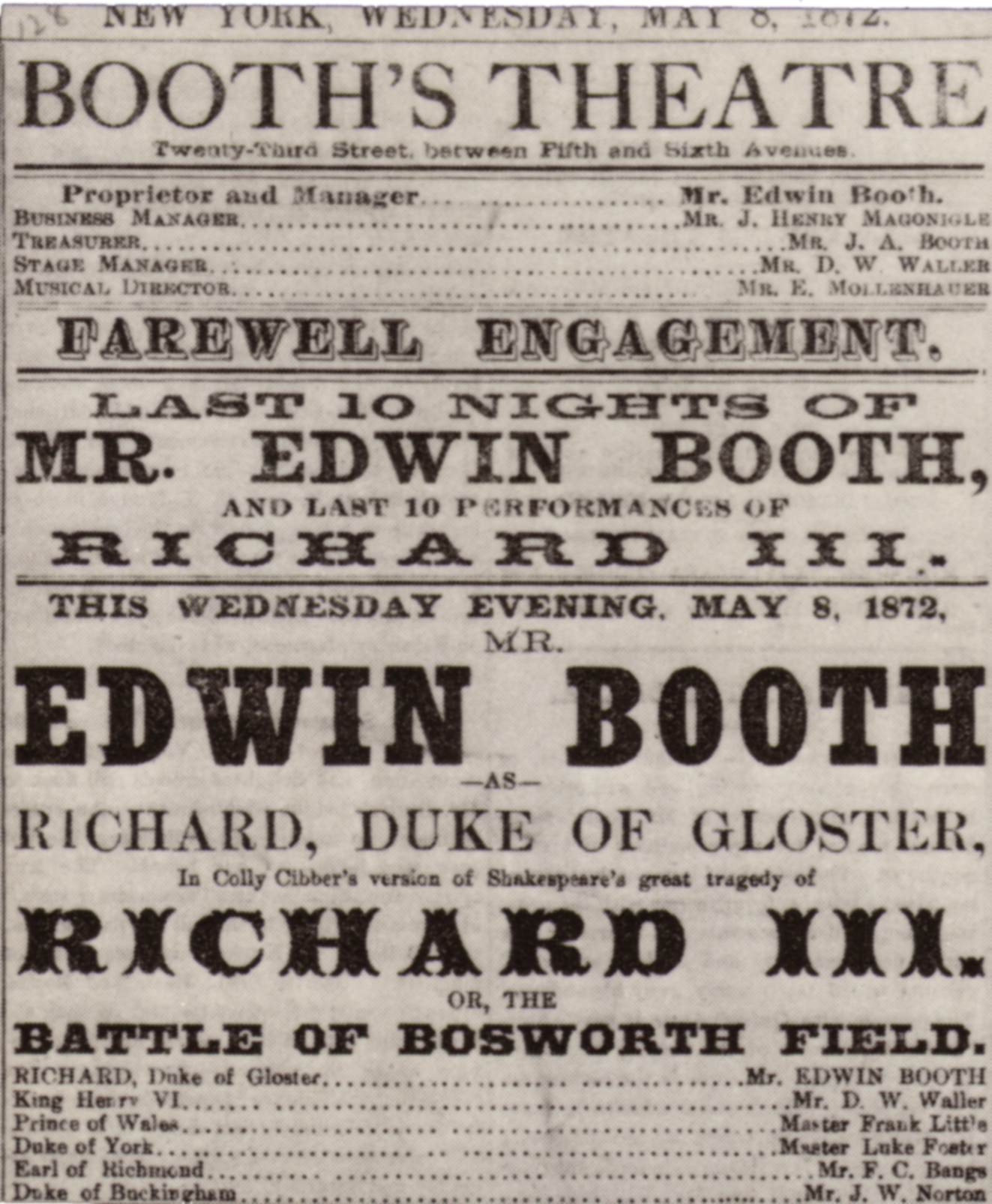
Booth's Theatre Playbill of his Richard III circa 1872

In 1867, a fire damaged the Winter Garden Theatre, resulting in the building's subsequent demolition. Afterwards, Booth built his own theatre, an elaborate structure called Booth's Theatre in Manhattan, which opened on February 3, 1869, with a production of Romeo and Juliet starring Booth as Romeo, and Mary McVicker as Juliet. Elaborate productions followed, but the theatre never became a profitable or even stable financial venture. The panic of 1873 caused the final bankruptcy of Booth's Theatre in 1874. After the bankruptcy, Booth went on another worldwide tour, eventually regaining his fortune.

=== Boothden ===
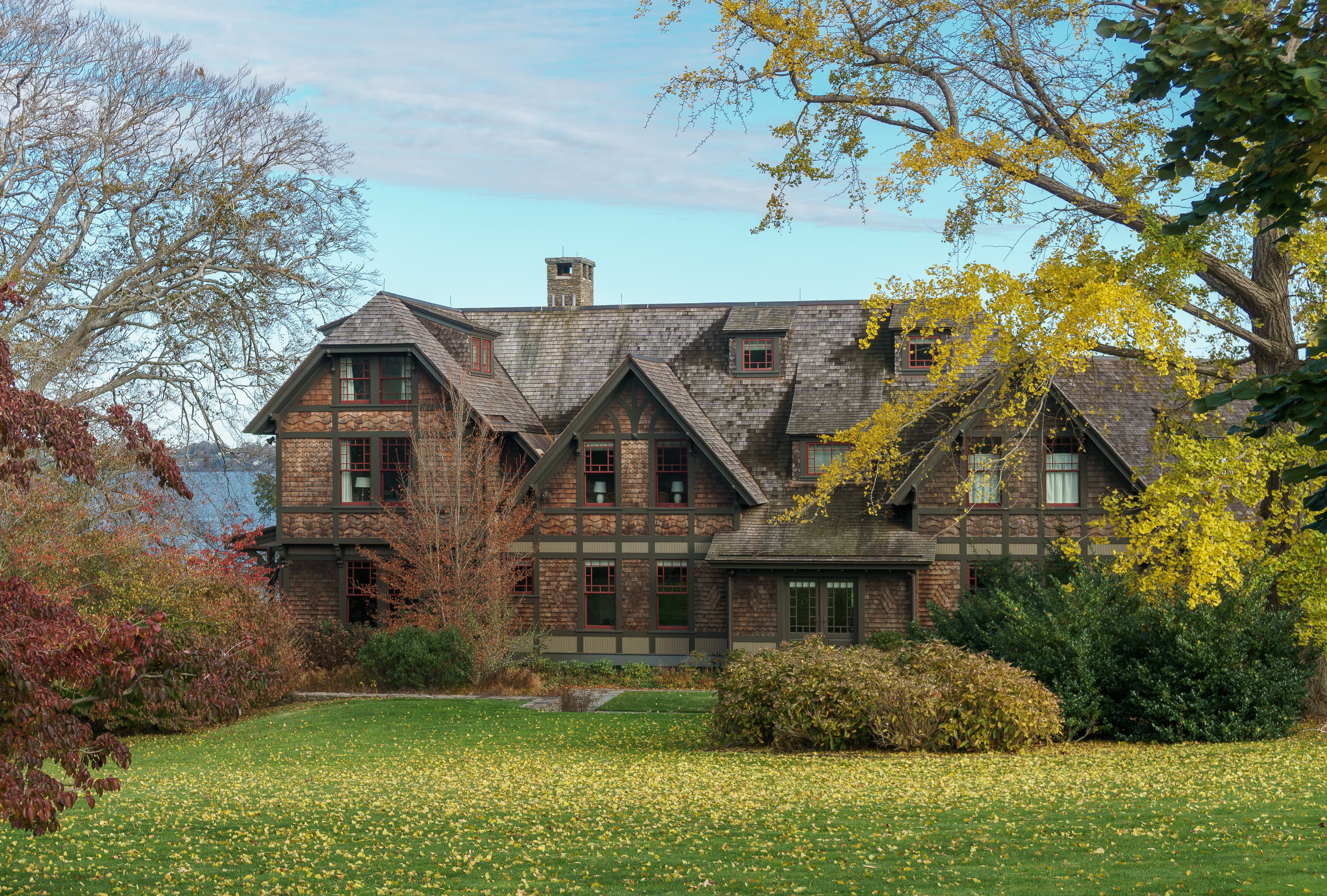
Boothden

In 1879, Booth purchased land in Middletown, Rhode Island on the Sakonnet River; he hired Calvert Vaux, whose son Downing Vaux was (briefly) engaged to Booth's daughter Edwina, to design a grand summer cottage estate there. "Boothden" was completed in 1884, a wooden house set on a stone foundation, designed in the Queen Anne Revival style with Stick style motifs and large plate glass windows. Boothden featured a dance hall, stables, boathouse, and a windmill folly with a henhouse at its base. Booth enjoyed ten years at Boothden, willing it to Edwina on his death in 1893. After Edwina sold Boothden in 1903, the house passed through a series of owners, including Time editor T. S. Matthews. The property saw a full restoration in 2008.

== Death ==
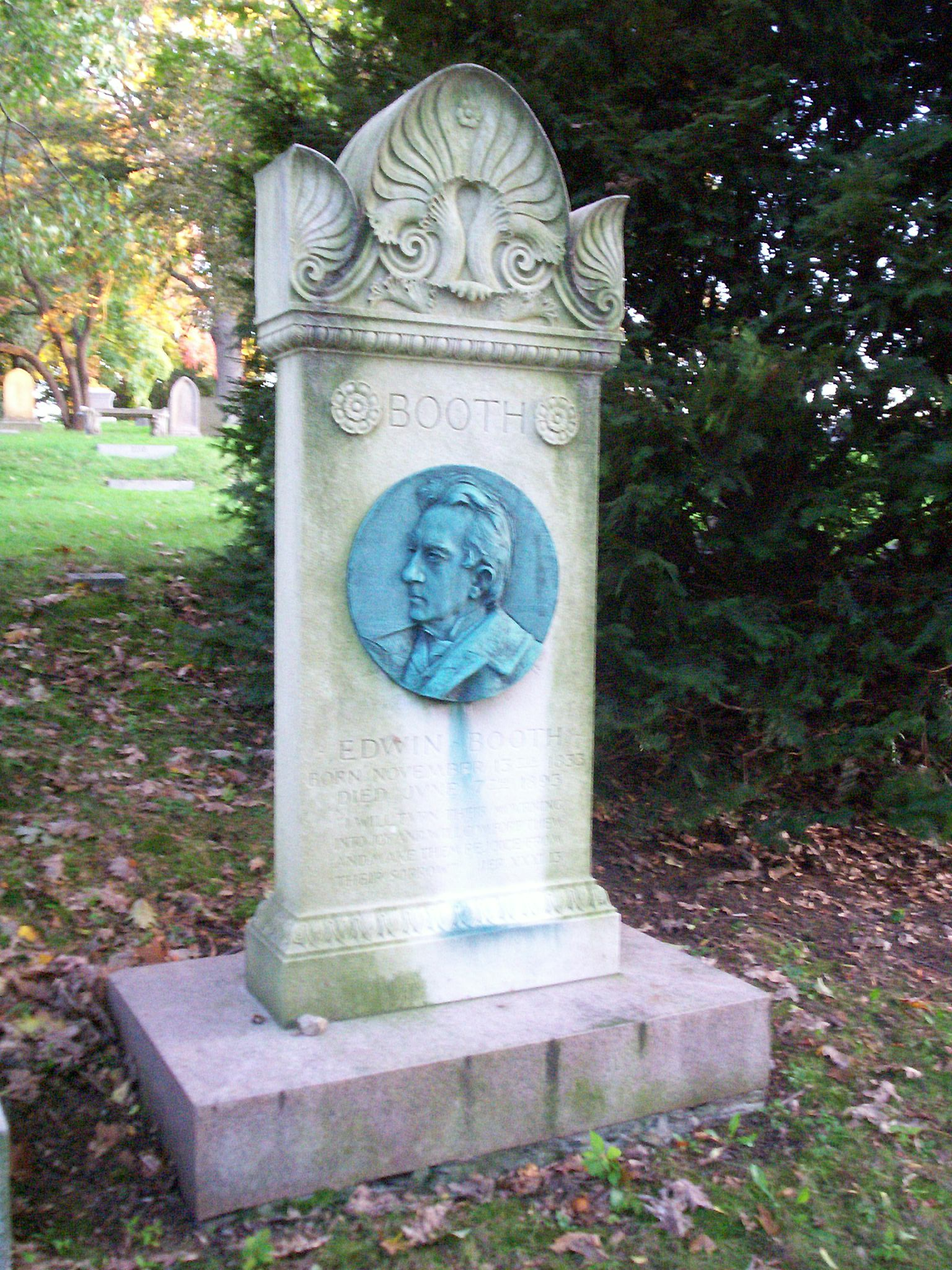
Booth's grave in Massachusetts

Booth had a small stroke in 1891, which precipitated his decline. He suffered another stroke in April 1893 and died June 7, 1893, in his apartment in The Players clubhouse. He was buried next to his first wife at Mount Auburn Cemetery in Cambridge, Massachusetts. His bedroom in the club has been kept untouched since his death.

=== Exhumation request ===
In December 2010, Booth's descendants reported that they obtained permission to exhume the Shakespearean actor's body to obtain DNA samples to compare with a sample of his brother John's DNA to refute the rumor he had escaped after the assassination. However, a spokesperson from the Mount Auburn Cemetery, where Booth is buried, denied reports that the family had contacted them and requested to exhume Edwin's body. The family hopes to obtain DNA samples from artifacts belonging to John Wilkes, or from remains such as vertebrae stored at the National Museum of Health and Medicine in Maryland. On March 30, 2013, museum spokesperson Carol Johnson announced that the family's request to extract DNA from the vertebrae had been rejected.

== Dramatizations ==
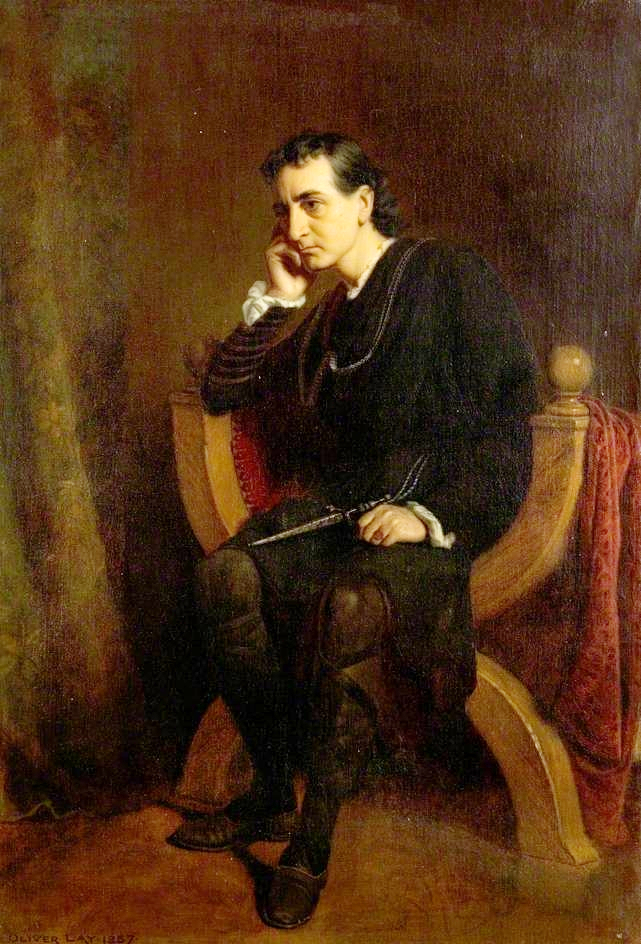
Edwin Booth as Hamlet, 1887 by Oliver Ingraham Lay

A number of modern dramatizations have been made of Edwin Booth's life, on both stage and screen.

One of the best known is the 1955 film Prince of Players written by Moss Hart, based loosely on the popular book of that name by Eleanor Ruggles. It was directed by Philip Dunne and stars Richard Burton and Raymond Massey as Edwin and Junius Brutus Booth Sr., with Charles Bickford as Prescott, producer of their Shakespeare tour. The cast also includes Eva Le Gallienne, who plays Gertrude to Burton's Hamlet, and who is listed on the opening credits as "Special Consultant on Shakespearean Scenes". The film depicts events in Booth's life well before, and then surrounding, the assassination of Lincoln by Booth's younger brother.

The opening scenes of Prince of Players are very similar to scenes in the earlier 1946 John Ford western My Darling Clementine. In that movie, the character of Granville Thorndyke (as acted by Alan Mowbray) is an obvious nod to Booth's father Junius, and the scenes portray essentially the same sequence where the great actor has to be retrieved from a bar and dragged back to the theatre where he is overdue to give a performance in front of a restless audience.

In 1958, José Ferrer produced, directed, and played the title role in a play Edwin Booth. It ran for three weeks.

In 1959, the actor Robert McQueeney played Booth in the episode "The Man Who Loved Lincoln" on the ABC/Warner Brothers western television series, Colt .45, starring Wayde Preston as the fictitious undercover agent Christopher Colt, who in the story line is assigned to protect Booth from a death threat.

In 1960, the anthology series television series Death Valley Days broadcast "His Brother's Keeper", in which Booth visits a small town after the Lincoln assassination, with one of the town's influential citizens trying to have him run out of town.

In 1966, Martin Landau played Edwin Booth in the episode "This Stage of Fools" of the NBC western television series, Branded, starring Chuck Connors as Jason McCord. In the story line, McCord takes a job as the bodyguard to the actor Edwin Booth, brother of the presidential assassin, John Wilkes Booth.

The Brothers BOOTH!, by W. Stuart McDowell, which focuses on the relationships of the three Booth brothers leading up to the assassination of Lincoln, was workshopped and given a series of staged readings featuring David Strathairn, David Dukes, Angela Goethals, Maryann Plunkett, and Stephen Lang at the New Harmony Project, and at The Guthrie Theatre Lab in Minneapolis, and later presented in New York at the Players' Club, the Second Stage Theatre, and the Boston Athenaeum. It was given its first fully staged professional production at the Bristol Riverside Theatre outside Philadelphia in 1992. A second play by the same name, The Brothers Booth, which focuses on "the world of the 1860s theatre and its leading family" was written by Marshell Bradley and staged in New York at the Perry Street Theatre in 2004.

Austin Pendleton's play, Booth, which depicts the early years of the brothers Edwin, Junius, and John Wilkes Booth and their father, was produced off Broadway at the York Theatre, starring Frank Langella as Junius Brutus Booth Sr. In a review, the play was called "a psychodrama about the legendary theatrical family of the 19th century" by The New York Times. Pendleton had adapted this version from his earlier work, Booth Is Back, produced at Long Wharf Theatre in New Haven, Connecticut, in the 1991–1992 season.

The Tragedian, by playwright and actor Rodney Lee Rogers, is a one-man show about Booth that was produced by PURE Theatre of Charleston, South Carolina, in 2007. It was revived for inclusion in the Piccolo Spoleto Arts Festival in May and June 2008.

A play by Luigi Creatore called Error of the Moon played off-Broadway on Theatre Row in New York City from August 13 to October 10, 2010. The play is a fictionalized account of Booth's life, hinging on the personal, professional, and political tensions between brothers Edwin and John Wilkes, leading up to the assassination of Lincoln.

In 2013, Will Forte played Edwin Booth in the "Washington, D.C." episode of the Comedy Central series, Drunk History, created by Derek Waters.

In 2014, Edwin Booth was played by Gordon Tanner in The Pinkertons episode, "The Play's the Thing" (S1:E3). In the episode, both the "Hundred nights Hamlet" and Edwin's rescue of Robert Lincoln are mentioned.

In 2023, Tyrants, an original musical about the life of Edwin Booth, was presented at the National Archives Museum in Washington, D.C. With music and lyrics by Alexander Sage Oyen and a book by Nora Brigid Monahan, the musical starred A.J. Shively as Edwin Booth, under the direction of John Simpkins.

Booth was portrayed by Nick Westrate in the 2024 Apple TV+ miniseries series Manhunt.

== Legacy ==
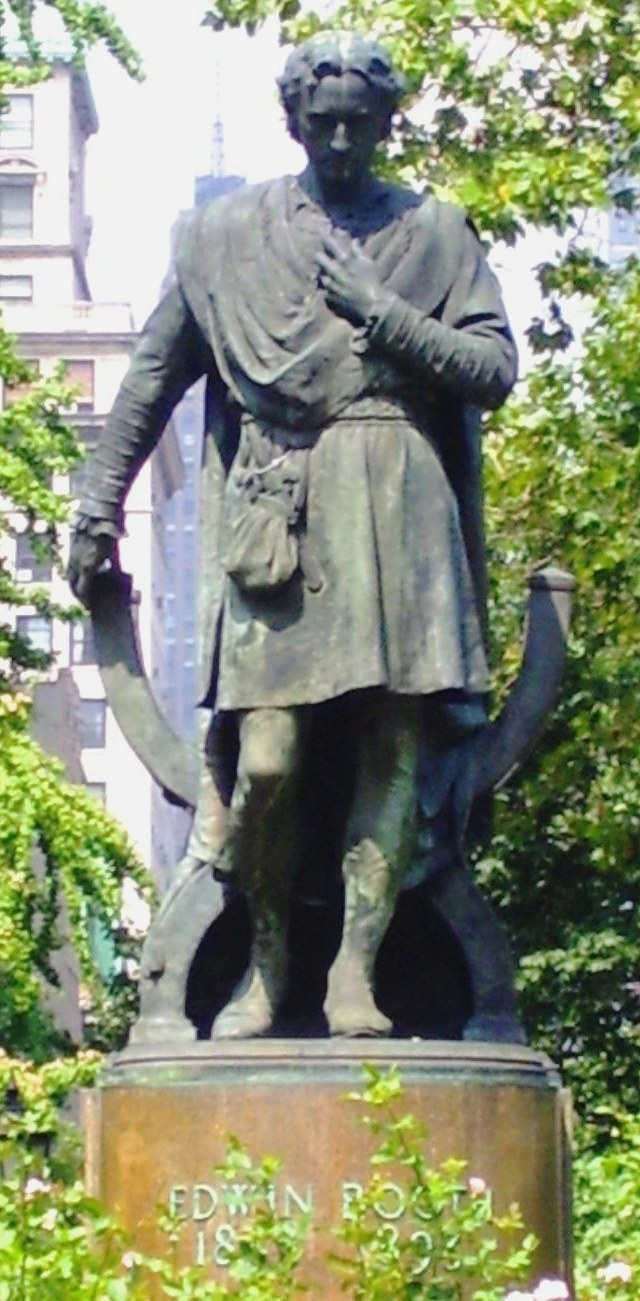
Statue of Booth as Hamlet in Gramercy Park, Manhattan

Booth left a considerable estate upon his death. He left charitable bequests that furthered the development of the acting profession and the treatment of mental illness. He left bequests of $5,000 each (almost $150,000 in 2021 dollars) to the Actor's' Fund, the Actors' Association of Friendship of the City of New York (Edwin Forrest Lodge), The Actors' Association of Friendship of the City of Philadelphia (Shakespeare Lodge), the Asylum Fund of New York and the Home for Incurables (West Farms, New York). Other examples of his legacy include:

- The Players still exists in its original clubhouse at 16 Gramercy Park South in Manhattan. A statue of Booth, by Edmond Thomas Quinn, has been the centerpiece of the private Gramercy Park since 1916. It can be seen by the public through the south gate of the park.
- Booth left a few recordings of his voice preserved on wax cylinder. One of them can be heard on the Naxos Records set Great Historical Shakespeare Recordings and Other Miscellany. Another place to hear his preserved voice is on the site shown here [3:34]. Booth's voice is barely audible with all the surface noise, but what can be deciphered reveals it to have been rich and deep.
- Memorials of Booth can still be found around Bel Air, Maryland. In front of the courthouse is a fountain dedicated to his memory. Inside the post office is a portrait of him. Also, his family's home, Tudor Hall, still stands and was bought in 2006 by Harford County, Maryland, to become a museum.
- A chamber in Mammoth Cave in Kentucky is called "Booth's Amphitheatre" – so called because Booth visited the cave and allegedly entertained visitors there.
- The Booth Theatre was the first, and remains the oldest, Broadway theatre to be named in honor of an actor.
- James Tyrone, in Eugene O'Neill's Long Day's Journey into Night, describes having received high praise from Booth after having acted opposite him; this reflected O'Neill's father James O'Neill (the prototype for Tyrone) having been complimented by Booth for his way with Shakespeare.
- Stephen Sondheim's musical Assassins mentions Booth in "The Ballad of Booth" with the lyrics: "Your brother made you jealous, John/You couldn't fill his shoes".
- Booth is a member of the American Theater Hall of Fame and the Hall of Fame for Great Americans.
- The Edwin Booth Family Collection archives are held in the University Library at California State University, Northridge.
- A memorial window for Booth was given to the Church of the Transfiguration by The Players in 1898.

In 1894, Booth's daughter, Edwina Booth Grossman, published a book about her father, reportedly concerned that his legacy as an actor would be marred by his brother's assassination of Abraham Lincoln in 1865. The volume was titled Edwin Booth: Recollections by His Daughter, Edwina Booth Grossman, and Letters to Her and to His Friends. As the title suggests, the book describes Grossman's memories of her father and contains edited transcripts of letters written by him.
