= Booth family =

English American theatrical family of the 19th century

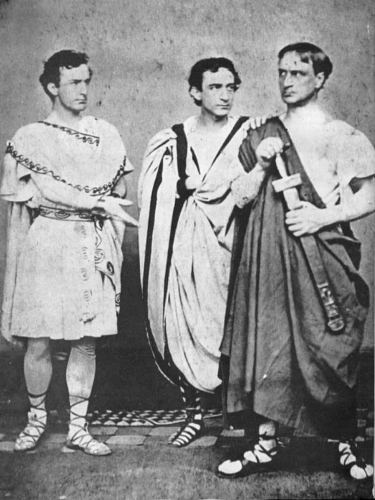
John Wilkes Booth, Edwin Booth and Junius Brutus Booth Jr. in Shakespeare’s Julius Caesar in 1864

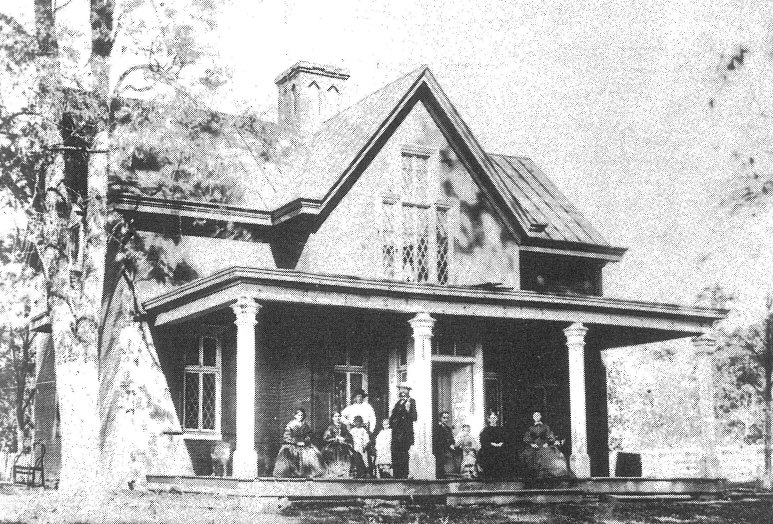
Tudor Hall in 1865

The Booth family was an English American theatrical family of the 19th century. Its most known members were brothers Edwin Booth, one of the leading actors of his day, and John Wilkes Booth, a fellow actor most remembered for assassinating Abraham Lincoln.

The patriarch, Junius Brutus Booth, was a London-born lawyer's son who eventually became an actor after he attended a production of Othello at the Covent Garden theatre. The prospects of fame, fortune, and freedom were very appealing to young Booth, and he displayed remarkable talent from an early age, deciding on a career in the theatre by the age of 17. He performed roles in several small theaters throughout England and joined a tour of the Low Countries in 1814, returning the following year to make his London debut.

Booth abandoned his wife and their young son in 1821 and ran off to the United States with Mary Ann Holmes, a London flower girl. They settled on some 150 acres in Harford County near Baltimore and started a family; they had 10 children, six of whom survived to adulthood.

Junius Sr. and Edwin toured in California during the gold rush. Edwin bought an interest in the Winter Garden Theatre at 667 Broadway in New York City with his brother-in-law John Sleeper Clarke. The brothers John Wilkes, Edwin, and Junius Brutus Jr. performed there in the play Julius Caesar at a benefit in 1864, the only time they were seen together on a stage, playing Mark Antony, Brutus, and Cassius, respectively.

== Members ==
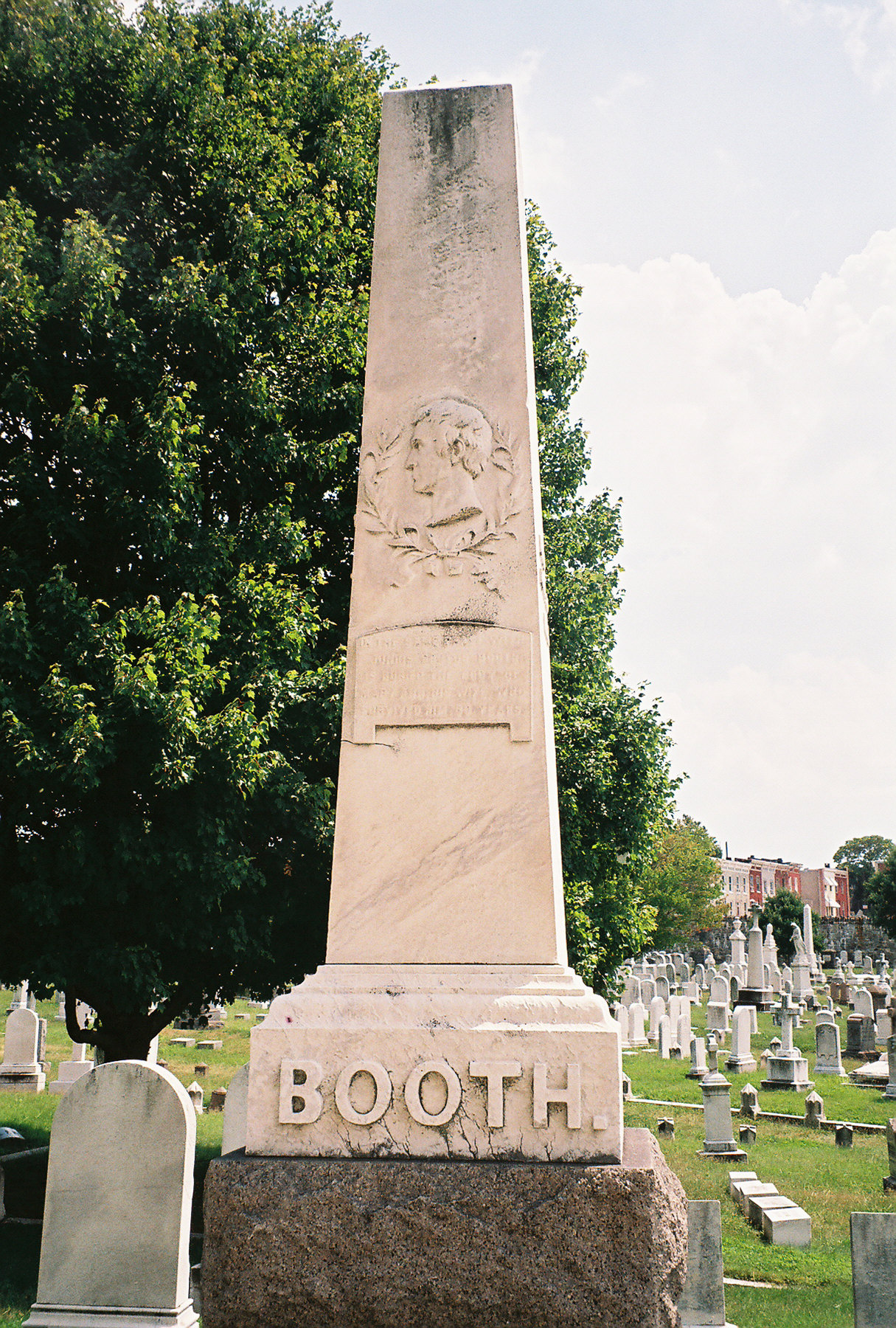
The Booth Family gravesite, Green Mount Cemetery

- Junius Brutus Booth (1796–1852) brought his mistress Mary Ann Holmes, who bore him 10 children, to the United States.
  - He also wrote many letters in fits of drunken anger and madness to President Andrew Jackson threatening assassination. He requested that two prisoners who had been sentenced to death for piracy, named De Ruiz and De Soto, be pardoned, or else: "I will cut your throat whilst you are sleeping." This letter would later be recanted by Junius, stating, "May god preserve General Jackson and this happy republic."
- Junius Brutus Booth Jr. (1821–1883) was married to Agnes Booth. Junius Jr. never achieved the same fame as his brothers, but his third wife Agnes was popular.
  - Their son Sydney Barton Booth (1877–1937) was an actor well into the era of modern film
- Edwin Thomas Booth (1833–1893) came to be the foremost American Shakespearean actor of his day. He founded The Players, a New York City actors' club which continues to the present day. His second wife, Mary McVicker, was an actress.
  - Edwin's grandson Edwin Booth Grossman was a painter of some note.
- Asia Frigga Booth (1835–1888) married John Sleeper Clarke, an actor/comedian who was briefly imprisoned in the aftermath of the assassination. They then emigrated to Britain, where he became a successful theatre manager.
  - Creston Clarke and Wilfred Clarke, sons of John and Asia, were noted actors in their day.
- John Wilkes Booth (1838–1865) was a popular young star in less serious fare than his brothers.
  - A Confederate sympathizer during the American Civil War, during a play attended by Abraham Lincoln, Booth took advantage of his access to the theatre to invade the President's box and assassinate the President. He was killed 12 days later by Union soldier Boston Corbett.
- Edwina Booth Grossman (1861–1938) daughter of Edwin Booth, and the author of Edwin Booth: Recollections by His Daughter, Edwina Booth Grossman, and Letters to Her and to His Friends (1894).

== See also ==
- Booth baronets
- Tony Booth (1931–2017), an English actor, was wrongly said to be a descendant of Algernon Booth (1798–1803), brother of Junius Sr.
- Cherie Blair, daughter of Tony Booth and the wife of former UK Prime Minister Tony Blair, was wrongly said to be a descendant of Algernon Booth (1798–1803).
- List of show business families
- John Wilkes Booth § In popular culture
