= Edmiston =

Edmiston is a surname. Notable people with the surname include:

- Althea Brown Edmiston (1874–1937), African-American teacher and missionary
- Andrew Edmiston Jr. (1892–1966), American politician
- Jeremy Edmiston (born 1964), Australian American architect
- Leona Edmiston, Australian fashion designer
- Liz Edmiston (1945–2008), British actress
- Paul L. Edmiston, chemistry professor
- Robert Edmiston (born 1946), British motor trade entrepreneur and philanthropist
- Sarah Edmiston (born 1975), Australian Paralympic athlete
- Walker Edmiston (1925–2007), American actor
- William S. Edmiston (1857–1903), Canadian politician
