= Maggie McNamara =

American actress and model (1928–1978)

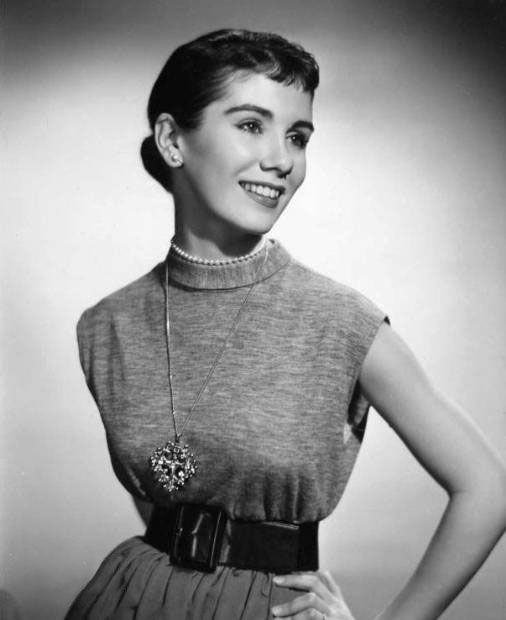
- Studio Publicity Photo, 1953.
- Born: Marguerite McNamara; June 18, 1928; New York City, U.S.
- Died: February 18, 1978 (aged 49); New York City, U.S.
- Resting place: Saint Charles Cemetery; Farmingdale, New York, U.S.
- Education: Textile High School
- Occupations: Actress; model
- Years active: 1951–1964
- Known for: The Moon Is Blue; Three Coins in the Fountain
- Spouse: David Swift (m.1951; div. 1957)

Marguerite McNamara (June 18, 1928 – February 18, 1978) was an American stage, film, and television actress and model. McNamara began her career as a teenage fashion model. She first came to public attention as Patty O'Neill in the 1951 national tour of F. Hugh Herbert's The Moon Is Blue which ran concurrently with the original Broadway production. In 1952 she succeeded Barbara Bel Geddes in that role in the Broadway production. Both productions were directed by Otto Preminger, and Preminger also directed McNamara in that role in the controversial 1953 film adaptation of that work. She earned an Academy Award nomination for Best Actress for her role in the film.

She appeared in only three films after The Moon Is Blue, with her last being The Cardinal in 1963. After five guest-starring roles in television series in the early 1960s, she retired from acting. For the remainder of her life, she worked as a typist in New York City. On February 18, 1978, McNamara died of an intentional barbiturate overdose at the age of 49.

== Early life ==
McNamara was born in New York City, one of four children of Timothy and Helen (née Fleming) McNamara. Her father was of Irish descent, while her mother was born in England to Irish parents. McNamara had two sisters, Helen and Cathleen, and a brother, Robert. Her parents divorced when she was nine years old.

She attended Textile High School in New York. As a teenager, McNamara was discovered when modeling agent John Robert Powers saw photos of her taken at a friend's home. With her mother's encouragement, McNamara signed with his agency and, while still in high school, began working as a teen model. She was one of the most successful teen models of the time and appeared in Seventeen, Life, Harper's Bazaar and Vogue. McNamara later commented on her modeling days:

I was terribly shy, and I used to work on myself to keep from showing it. When I was facing a camera, I pretended that neither it nor the photographer were there. I played a game with myself according to the clothes I was wearing...You have to feel right in what you are wearing, to have it look right. Just as each period has its own fashion, each person has his own style. When you find it, I think you should stay with it. When I was modeling I had to dress exactly as Vogue wanted the picture to be. But any good quality becomes something else when it is overdone, and I feel that this applies to being too clothes conscious. I don't care what the fashion dictator says. I will not follow if it's not right for me. But your overall impression consists of more than clothes. Your grooming, posture, the sound of your voice, and your perfume play a part in the total picture you create.

In April 1950, McNamara appeared on the cover of Life magazine for a second time. After seeing her on the cover, producer David O. Selznick offered her a film contract. She turned it down and continued to model while studying dance and acting.

== Career ==
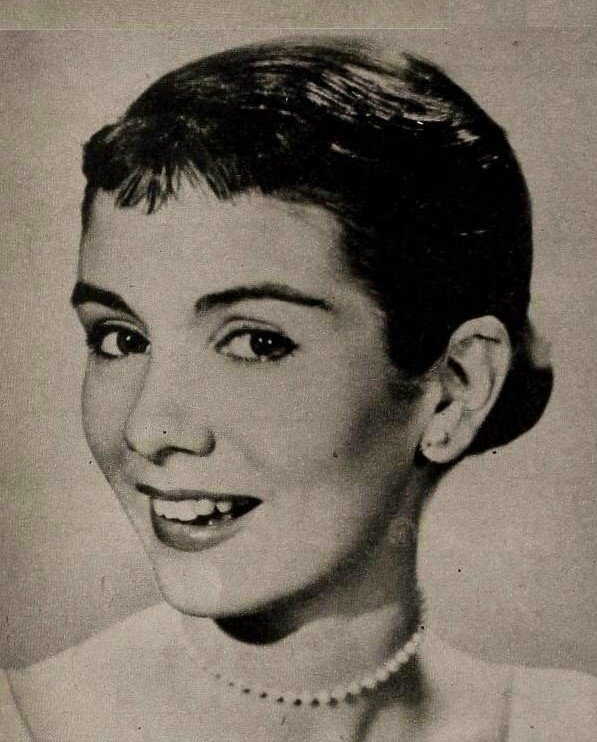
Maggie McNamara in 1954

McNamara made her professional stage debut on January 29, 1951, at the McCarter Theatre in Princeton, New Jersey as Una Brehony in the United States premiere of Michael J. Molloy's comedy The King of Friday's Men. Directed by John Burrell, the play had enjoyed a lengthy run previously under Burrell's direction at the Abbey Theatre for the National Theatre of Ireland. The production moved to Broadway's Playhouse Theatre; marking McNamara's Broadway debut on February 21, 1951. Short lived, it ran for just four performances.

McNamara next portrayed Alice in George S. Kaufman and Moss Hart's You Can't Take It with You at the Lenox Hill Playhouse in late March and April 1951. Soon after, she appeared as Patty O'Neill in the national touring production of The Moon Is Blue which began its run in Detroit on April 20, 1951, under the direction of Otto Preminger. Written by F. Hugh Herbert, the play was already a Broadway hit starring Barbara Bel Geddes as Patty O'Neill under Preminger's direction. McNamara left the national tour to take over the role of Patty O'Neill on Broadway in June 1952.

In 1953, McNamara went to Hollywood to reprise her role in Preminger's film adaptation of The Moon Is Blue. The film was highly controversial at the time due to its sexual themes and frank dialogue (the play and the film contain the words "virgin", "pregnant,” “mistress”, and "seduce"). As a result, the film failed to secure the seal of approval from the MPAA. United Artists, who produced The Moon Is Blue, decided to release the film anyway. It was promptly banned in Kansas, Maryland and Ohio and given a "Condemned" rating by the National Legion of Decency. Despite the controversy, the film was a success and earned $3.5 million at the box office. While box office returns were strong, The Moon Is Blue received mixed reviews. McNamara's performance earned her an Academy Award nomination for Best Actress and a BAFTA nomination for Most Promising Newcomer to Film.

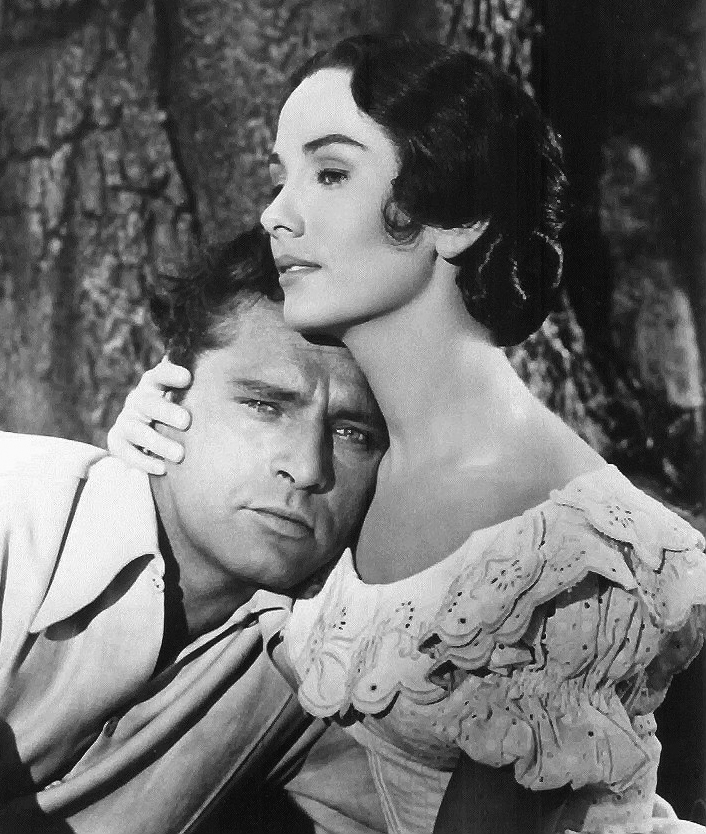
Richard Burton and Maggie McNamara in Prince of Players (1955)

After filming, McNamara signed with 20th Century Fox and was cast in the 1954 romantic drama film Three Coins in the Fountain. The film was generally well received and helped to boost McNamara's popularity. The following year, she co-starred opposite Richard Burton in the biographical film Prince of Players. Although McNamara's career started well, she made only one more film after Prince of Players. Part of the reason why her career stalled has been attributed to her refusal to move to Los Angeles. She also reportedly refused to do publicity for her films or pose for the cheesecake shots that studios generally expected their female stars to do. Her career troubles were furthered by emotional problems. In his 1977 memoir, director Otto Preminger wrote that, "Maggie suffered greatly after becoming a star. Something went wrong with her marriage to director David Swift. She suffered a nervous breakdown."

After 1955, McNamara did not accept any screen roles for the remainder of the decade. In 1962, she returned to acting in the Broadway play Step on a Crack. Later that year, she performed in a production of Neil Simon's Come Blow Your Horn with Darren McGavin at the Royal Poinciana Playhouse in Florida. She had previously worked with McGavin on a one-night only performance of Shakespeare's Measure for Measure. The following year, Otto Preminger cast her in a small role in The Cardinal. It proved to be her final film role. In 1963, McNamara turned to television. She guest starred on an episode of Ben Casey and starred as the title character in the Season 5 Twilight Zone episode "Ring-a-Ding Girl". McNamara's last onscreen appearance was in the July 1964 episode of The Alfred Hitchcock Hour entitled "Body in the Barn", opposite Lillian Gish.

== Personal life ==
In March 1951, McNamara married actor and director David Swift. The couple had no children and later divorced (Swift remarried in 1957). McNamara never remarried. After her divorce, she had a relationship with screenwriter Walter Bernstein.

== Later years and death ==
After her last onscreen role in 1964, McNamara fell out of public view. For the remaining 15 years of her life, she worked temporary jobs as a typist to support herself. Her obituary noted she had been writing scripts, including one titled The Mighty Dandelion, which had been purchased by a production company at the time of her death.

On February 18, 1978, McNamara was found dead on the couch of her apartment in New York City. She had deliberately taken an overdose of sleeping pills and tranquilizers and left a suicide note on her piano. According to police reports, she had a history of mental illness, and friends reported that she had suffered from severe depression. McNamara is interred in Saint Charles Cemetery in Farmingdale, New York.

== Broadway productions ==
Theater work by Maggie McNamara
Year	Title	Roles
1951	The King of Friday's Men	Una Brehony
1962	Step on a Crack	Naomi Mazer

== Filmography ==
Film and television work by Maggie McNamara
Year	Title	Role	Notes
1953	The Moon Is Blue	Patty O'Neill	Nominated: Academy Award for Best Actress; Nominated: Most Promising Newcomer to Film BAFTA Award
1953	Die Jungfrau auf dem Dach	Tourist	Uncredited; Alternative title: The Girl on the Roof
1954	Three Coins in the Fountain	Maria Williams	
1955	Prince of Players	Mary Devlin Booth	
1963	The Cardinal	Florrie Fermoyle	Final film appearance
1963	Ben Casey	Dede Blake	Episode: "The Last Splintered Spoke of the Old Burlesque Wheel"
1963	The Twilight Zone	Barbara "Bunny" Blake	Season 5, episode 13: "Ring-a-Ding Girl"
1964	The Great Adventure	Laura Drake	Episode: "The Colonel from Connecticut"
1964	The Greatest Show on Earth	Moira O'Kelley	Episode: "Clancy"
1964	The Alfred Hitchcock Hour	Camilla	Episode: "Body in the Barn" (final appearance)

== Awards and nominations ==
Accolades for Maggie McNamara
Year	Award	Category	Nominated work	Result
1954	26th Academy Awards	Academy Award for Best Actress	The Moon Is Blue	Nominated
1955	8th British Academy Film Awards	BAFTA Award for Most Promising Newcomer to Leading Film Roles	The Moon Is Blue	Nominated
