= Bernard and Anne Spitzer School of Architecture =

Architecture school at City College of New York

Spitzer School of Architecture
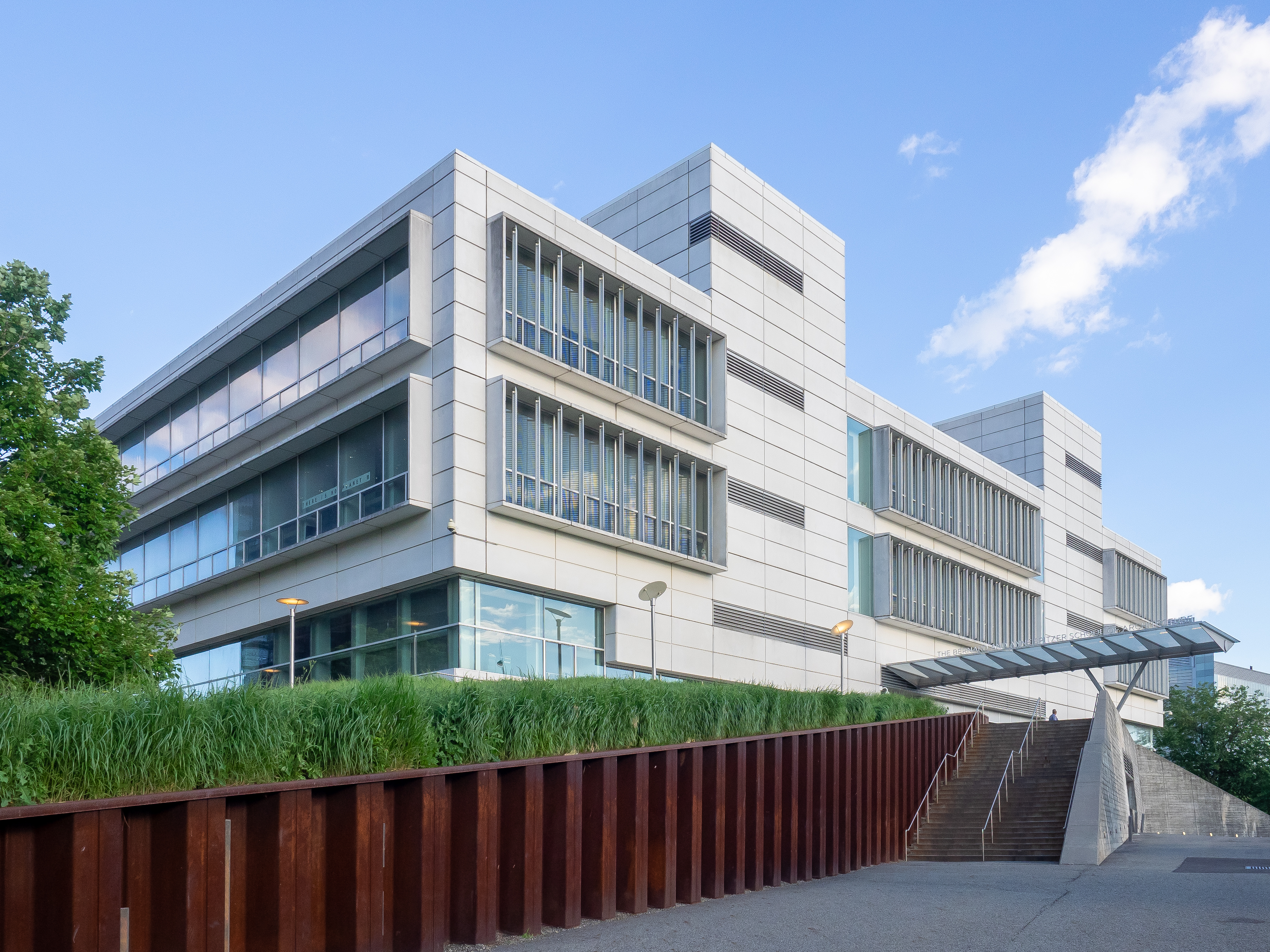
- The Bernard and Anne Spitzer School of Architecture
- Type: Public
- Established: 1969; 57 years ago
- Parent institution: City College of New York
- Dean: Marta Gutman
- Undergraduates: 400
- Postgraduates: 120
- Location: 141 Convent Ave, New York, New York, New York, 10031, United States; 40.817740°N 73.950684°W
- Campus: Urban
- Website: ssa.ccny.cuny.edu

The Bernard and Anne Spitzer School of Architecture is one of the eight schools and colleges of City College of New York. The school offers bachelor's and master's degrees in architecture that are accredited by the National Architectural Accrediting Board (NAAB). The school provides the only public Master of Architecture and Master of Landscape Architecture programs in New York City.

== History ==
The architecture program at City College, originally a part of the School of Engineering, moved from Goethals Hall to a former garage at 3300 Broadway in the 1960s. After receiving NAAB accreditation in 1969, the school appointed its first dean, Bernard Spring, with cofounder Norval White as chair. Spring was followed by M. Rosaria Piomelli who became the first woman dean of an architecture school in the United States in 1980. The school moved back to the City College campus in 1984 under the leadership of Donald P. Ryder, who had taught at City College since 1972.

In 1999 Rafael Viñoly was hired to design a new facility to house the school, which opened in 2009 at the south end of the City College campus in a former library building. The school was officially renamed following a multi-million dollar donation from Bernard Spitzer in the same year as the school's move.

In 2019, architect Lesley Lokko was appointed dean, a post from which she resigned less than two years later. Founded in 1969, City College's was the only public school of architecture in New York City until 2023, when the New York City College of Technology received accreditation for a BArch program.

== Academics ==
Spitzer's undergraduate program enrolls nearly 400 students and leads to a Bachelor of Architecture (BArch) degree. The graduate program enrolled 120 students in 2021 and offers Master of Architecture, Master of Landscape Architecture, and post-professional Master of Science in Architecture programs. The school also offers programs in Urban Design and Sustainability.

== Faculty ==
There are 25 full-time and 35 part-time faculty members. Notable instructors include Horst Berger, Marshall Berman, Hillary Brown, Richard Dattner, Jerrilynn Dodds, Jeremy Edmiston, M. Paul Friedberg, Gordon Gebert, George Ranalli, Michael Sorkin, Joseph Tanney, and June Williamson.

== Notable alumni ==
- Alan Hantman (BArch 1966)
- Deborah Berke (MUP)
- Oral Selkridge (BArch 1987)
