= Marta Gutman =

American architect

Marta Gutman is an American architect and current dean of the Bernard and Anne Spitzer School of Architecture. She was appointed interim dean in 2021 alongside Michael Miller, the school's interim associate dean, and became dean in 2022, following the resignation of Lesley Lokko in 2020. She received the Catherine W. Bishir prize in 2021.

== Early life and education ==
Gutman was born in a secular Jewish family as the third generation of Eastern European immigrants. She was raised in New York City and attended Brown University, graduating with a bachelor's degree in art. At Columbia University, she obtained a master's degree in architecture, and completed her Ph.D. at The University of California, Berkeley.

== Bibliography ==
- A City for Children: Women, Architecture, and the Charitable Landscapes of Oakland, 1850-1950 (2014)
