= New Cambridge Lofts =

Condominium in Edmonton, Alberta

- Location within Edmonton

General information
- Status: Completed
- Type: Residential, Commercial
- Location: 10024-Jasper Avenue; Edmonton, Alberta, Canada
- Coordinates: 53°32′29″N 113°29′29″W
- Completed: 1968

Technical details
- Floor count: 18

Design and construction
- Architect: Richards Berretti Jellenick

New Cambridge Lofts is an eighteen-storey historic building located in Downtown Edmonton. Converted from an office building into condos, New Cambridge Lofts now contains over 200 residential and commercial condo units.

== History ==
Completed in 1968, New Cambridge Lofts was designed by architectural firm Richards Berretti Jellenick in the style of modern architecture. As an office building, New Cambridge Lofts was the corporate home of some of the city's largest law firms and housed in its lower floor a large high-end restaurant and bar called Churchill's. The existing tower is only one-half of the architects' original plan; another matching tower was supposed to be constructed to the east of the Cambridge but was never completed.

In 2002, New Cambridge Lofts was converted into condominiums by Worthington Properties, who divided the former office tower into more than 200 residential and commercial units. In 2011, an architecturally significant penthouse was constructed using the shell of the building's former mechanical room. This project was featured in several architectural and design publications including Dwell (magazine), Western Living magazine, Avenue magazine and the Edmonton Journal.

Also notable are the renovations made to New Cambridge Lofts between 2012 and 2015, including glass elevator interiors designed by Edmonton architect Sherri Shorten and a large lobby feature wall painted with a mural by Edmonton artist Jason Blower.
