= Galanter & Jones =

American design company

- Company type: Private
- Industry: Design & Manufacturing
- Founded: 2012
- Founders: Aaron and Miranda Jones
- Headquarters: San Francisco, United States
- Area served: United States
- Products: Heated furniture
- Website: galanterandjones.com

Galanter & Jones is a San Francisco-based design and fabrication studio known for its heated seating.

== History ==
The studio was founded by the siblings Aaron and Miranda Jones in 2012. The company debuted with heated outdoor seating.

The company is known for its heated furniture which is an alternative to traditional outdoor heating methods.

In 2015, Galanter & Jones was awarded Best Outdoor at Dwell on Design.

In 2018, the company won the Furniture Innovation award at San Francisco Design Week.

Galanter & Jones has received coverage from various publications such as Elle Decor, House Beautiful, and Dwell among others.
