= Walter Macken =

Irish actor and writer (1915–1967)

Walter Macken (Irish: Uaitéar Ó Maicín; 3 May 1915 – 22 April 1967) was an Irish writer of short stories, novels and plays.

== Biography ==
Macken was born in Galway. He was initially an actor, principally with the Taibhdhearc (where he met his wife, Peggy) in Galway, and the Abbey Theatre in Dublin. He played lead roles on Broadway in M. J. Molloy's The King of Friday's Men and his own play Home Is the Hero. He also acted in films, notably in Arthur Dreifuss' adaptation of Brendan Behan's The Quare Fellow.

The success of his third book, Rain on the Wind (winner of the Literary Guild award in the USA), enabled him to focus on writing. He is perhaps best known for his trilogy of Irish historical novels: Seek the Fair Land, The Silent People, and The Scorching Wind.

In September 1966 he moved to the small Gaeltacht village of Menlo, County Galway. Many of Macken's works are rooted in the Galway area of Connemara.

He died suddenly at home on 22 April 1967, survived by his wife and two sons. His son Ultan Macken is a print and broadcast journalist, and wrote a biography of his father, Walter Macken: Dreams on Paper.

== List of works ==
=== Plays ===
- Mungo's Mansion (Macmillan, 1946)
- Vacant Possession (Macmillan, 1948)
- Home is the Hero (Macmillan, 1952)
- Twilight is the Warrior (Macmillan, 1956)

=== Novels ===
- Quench the Moon (Macmillan, 1948)
- I Am Alone (Macmillan, 1949)
- Rain on the Wind (London, MacMillan, 1950)
- The Bogman (MacMillan, 1952)
- Sunset on the Window Panes (Macmillan, 1954)
- Sullivan (Macmillan, 1957)
- Seek the Fair Land (MacMillan, 1959)
- The Silent People (MacMillan, 1962)
- The Scorching Wind (MacMillan, 1964)
- Brown Lord of the Mountain (Macmillan, 1966)

Two further novels, 'And then No More' (1946) and 'Cockles and Mustard' (1947) remain unpublished.

=== Novels for children ===
Macken wrote some 5 collections of short stories for children, and also:

- Island of the Great Yellow Ox (MacMillan, 1966)
- Flight of the Doves (MacMillan, 1963), which was adapted for the cinema.

=== Short story collections ===
- The Green Hills (MacMillan, 1956)
1. Gaeglers and the Wild Geese
2. The Currach Race
3. The Gauger
4. The Young Turk
5. The Proud Man
6. The Green Hills
7. Barney's Maggie
8. The Sailor
9. The Hurling Match
10. Duck Soup
11. The Fair Lady
12. The Lady and the Tom
13. The Atheist
14. The Wasteland
15. Tuesday's Children
16. Hallmarked
17. The Eyes of the Cat
18. Foreign Fish
19. The Boy and the Brace
20. The River
21. The King
- God Made Sunday and other Stories (Macmillan, 1962)
1. God Made Sunday
2. Patter O'Rourke
3. The Big Fish
4. Solo and the Nine Irons
5. The Match Maiden
6. The Conjugator
7. Solo and the Simpleton
8. Light in the Valley
9. This Was My Day
10. Solo and the Sinner
11. No Medal for Matt
12. The Red Rager
13. The Lion
- The Coll Doll and other Stories (Macmillan, 1969)
1. The Coll Doll
2. The Currach Race*
3. Duck Soup*
4. The Kiss
5. Characters in Order of Appearance
6. Gaeglers and the Wild Geese*
7. The Wasteland*
8. The Fair Lady*
9. The Eyes of the Cat*
10. A Talk in the Dark
11. My Neighbour
12. Foreign Fish*
13. The Hurling Match*
14. The Green Hills*
15. Tuesday's Children*
16. The Lady and the Tom*
17. Janey is a Girl
18. Barney's Maggie*
19. The Dreamer
20. The River*
21. Three Witnesses

* Previously published in The Green Hills (MacMillan, 1956)

- City of the Tribes (Brandon, 1997)
1. Ambition
2. Battle
3. The Passing of the Black Swan
4. New Clothes for the Giolla
5. Dad
6. Deputy Johnny
7. Tail of a Kid
8. Saga
9. Dovetail and the Turkey
10. Homecoming
11. Homing Salmon
12. Spanish Joe
13. Colm comes to the Citie
14. The Citie
15. An Act of Charity
16. Pugnug
17. The New Broom
18. Gaeglers and the Greyhound
- The Grass of the People (Brandon, 1998)
1. The Grass of the People
2. What will we do with the Yanks
3. Solo and the Sailor
4. This Was My Day**
5. The Storm is Still
6. How to Poach a Salmon
7. Sukos
8. The Mare with Foal at Foot
9. The Green Dream
10. Challenge the River
11. The Tangler
12. The Bachelor
13. The Coll Doll*
14. The Kiss*
15. Characters in Order of Appearance*
16. A Talk in the Dark*
17. My Neighbour*
18. Jane is a Girl*
19. The Dreamer*
20. Three Witnesses*

* Previously published in The Coll Doll and other Stories (Macmillan, 1969)
** Previously published in God Made Sunday and other Stories (Macmillan, 1962)

=== Filmography ===
- Flight of the Doves (1971)
- The Quare Fellow (1962)
- Home Is the Hero (1959)
