= Stanlee Gatti =

American event designer

Stanlee Ray Gatti
- Born: October 28, 1955 (age 70); Raton, New Mexico, U.S.
- Education: University of Northern Colorado; University of Oregon
- Occupations: event designer, arts administrator

Stanlee Ray Gatti (born October 28, 1955) is an American event designer and arts administrator, based in San Francisco, California. Gatti is recognized for his innovation and unique style in the decoration and design of large and lavish parties.

He has served in leadership roles at the San Francisco Arts Commission, and California Art Council. Gatti founded the annual art fair, Fog Fair.

== Early life and education ==
Gatti was born in a small mining town of Raton, New Mexico, and is the second youngest of five children born to mother Ann Simovich Gatti and father Larry Gatti. His father who was a coal miner and a master craftsman was born in Arpino, Italy. His mother was born in Van Houten, New Mexico, and is of Montenegrin descent. Gatti is proud of his cultural heritage and always responds to anyone who simplifies his heritage as Italian merely by his surname saying, "I am half Italian and half Montenegrin."

Gatti studied at both the University of Northern Colorado and the University of Oregon. After college he briefly returned home to coordinate events at the local country club, and worked as a department store window dresser. Within the year, he moved to Aspen, Colorado to participate in the Aspen Music Festival and worked in a local plant store. In August 1978, he moved to San Francisco and landed a job at the St. Francis Hotel flower shop. Later he was hired to work for the hotel in the capacity of Hospitality Manager, a position created for him by Bill Grzywacz, a hotel executive who later became Gatti's partner and most trusted advisor.

== Event planning ==
In 1985 the Hotel St. Francis catering director, Larry Dean asked Gatti to design a table for a group of women who were on the planning committee for the 75th Anniversary of the San Francisco Symphony. The committee consisted of Danielle Walker, founder of the California Culinary Academy, Nancy Bechtle, Genelle Relfe, and Barri Ramsey.* During that era the Hotel was the largest caterer of San Francisco society events and was hired to cater the SFS Anniversary gala. Once the women saw the table, Walker reportedly exclaimed “who did this?” and the committee asked Gatti to design the Gala, although he had never done anything on that scale before.

In Gatti’s first professional effort, he stirred up the traditional staid Symphony crowd with unusually bold colors and design. By the morning after the gala Gatti was receiving calls from San Francisco social doyennes and within three months, Gatti left his position at the hotel and started his own firm, Stanlee R. Gatti Designs.

He soon joined the ranks of the San Francisco elite, not only creating events but attending, hosting, and having parties thrown for him. According to his mother, “Stan never meets a stranger”. A local blog, the SFist ran a “Stanlee Gatti count” to list his mentions in San Francisco gossip columns. In 1998 San Francisco Examiner Rob Morse deemed him one of the three most powerful people in San Francisco.

Gatti’s event design career has been covered in numerous publications including: W Magazine, Town and Country Magazine, People magazine, InStyle magazine, San Francisco Chronicle Magazine.

== Civic involvement and positions ==
In 1996, Mayor Willie Brown appointed Gatti as the President of the San Francisco Arts Commission, an important agency that manages a set-aside art fund of two percent of all city building projects. Gatti used his position to push the boundaries of San Francisco’s famously conservative taste in public art. His best-received initiatives were installations by Vito Acconci, Ned Kahn, Robert Arneson and Bill Viola. Gatti brought ten Keith Haring sculptures to San Francisco, one of which remains at Moscone Center. Gatti generated as much controversy as admiration. He jokingly proposed to mount a 30 foot Louise Bourgeois spider atop the dome of San Francisco’s City Hall which created turmoil within the community. A more serious proposal to install a sculpture in the panhandle of Golden Gate Park of a giant peace symbol by artist Tony Labat ran afoul by neighborhood activists and was subsequently rejected by the Recreation and Parks Commission. In 1999, an already approved commission for a stainless steel sculpture of a giant foot by artist Buster Simpson to be placed by the Ferry Building was criticized by members of the public and by the San Francisco Board of Supervisors who ultimately defunded the project. Gatti unexpectedly resigned from the commission during the midterm of Mayor Gavin Newsom.

In 1999, Gatti was appointed to the California Art Council by Governor Gavin Newsom. He is a trustee of the board of directors of the California College of the Arts, a trustee of The San Francisco War Memorial Board and a founding member of the FOG Fair. He is a past member of the Yerba Buena Center for the Arts board of directors, and the San Francisco Zoo board of directors.

== Fog Fair ==
In 2008, Gatti founded a San Francisco-based art and design fair titled SF20, which, several years later was renamed, FOG FAIR and was created to benefit SFMOMA. The fair serves as one of the preeminent art and design fairs nationwide. FOG Fair has a volunteer board of directors consisting of Gatti, Katie Schwab Paige, Allison Spear, Douglas Durkin, and Susan Swig. The fair entrance is consistently designed and created by Gatti in what has become the conic installation titled 21POP.

== Personal life ==
He was best man at the wedding of Governor Gavin Newsom to former wife Kimberly Guilfoyle, and designed Governor Newsom’s subsequent Montana wedding to Jennifer Siebel.

His notable acquaintances included Robin Williams, Jason Lewis, Danielle Steel, Joni Mitchell, Steve Silver, Ann and Gordon Getty, Helen and Chuck Schwab, Charlotte and George Shultz, and David Blaine.

Gatti has been photographed by notable photographers including Larry Sultan.

== Design style ==
His style is spontaneous and focuses heavily on color. He is responsible for inventing many event design techniques which have become the standard in the event world.

== Stanlee R. Gatti Designs ==
Mr. Gatti’s company Stanlee R Gatti Designs produces events where the focus is on the design and aesthetic experience. His work involves the fabrication and installation of decorations, interior design, tents, and other temporary structures, lighting, flowers, costumes, entertainment, and table settings. Some are mise-en-scene installations, such as simulating a forest inside a tent (including a black night sky, mulch floor, live pine trees, fog, and cold temperature) to celebrate San Francisco’s Presidio becoming a part of the National Park Service.

His staff of 55 people produces weddings, galas, and all forms of events worldwide.

=== Solo installations ===
- Yerba Buena Center for the Arts, "Stanlee's Brain", 2006
- Conservatory of Flowers, "One: An Earth Installation", 2007.

=== Commissioned projects ===
- City of San Francisco, approximately 100 events including inauguration of Mayors Willie Brown and Gavin Newsom
- San Francisco Symphony, various projects including 75th anniversary gala (1987), season openings, and Black and White Ball
- Fairmont Hotel, luncheon for Mikhail Gorbachev, 1990
- Giorgio Armani, fashion show, 1997
- Matrix Fillmore nightclub, San Francisco, designer and partner, 2002.
- InStyle Magazine, Sir Elton John's Oscar party, 2003 and 2004
- Fleur de Lys Restaurant, Las Vegas, Nevada, interior design, 2004
- Jack Falstaff Restaurant, San Francisco, California, interior design, 2004
- Lucasarts, Letterman Digital Arts Center grand opening, 2005.
- People magazine, Screen Actors Guild awards and post-award party, 2004 through 2007.
- Charles Koch, birthday dinner, 2005
- Gordon Getty, birthday party, 2003, 2006 2007, and 2009
- American Conservatory Theater, 40th Anniversary event, 2007
- SFMOMA, Modern Ball, 2005, 2007, 2010, 2012, 2014, 2016, 2018 and other projects
- California College of the Arts, Threads Gala, 2007
- Kanye West and Kim Kardashian, engagement at AT&T Park, 2013
- Arista Records, 25th Anniversary gala, 1999

=== Weddings ===
- Susie Russell and Mark Buell, 1996
- George P. Shultz and Charlotte Mailliard, 1997
- Danielle Steel and Tom Perkins, 1998
- Lara Hedberg and Christopher Deam, 2001
- Christy Turlington and Edward Burns, 2003
- Gavin Newsom and Jennifer Siebel, 2008
- Vanessa Traina & Maxwell Snow, 2012
- Ivy Getty and Tobias Alexander Engel, 2021
- Eve Jobs and Harry Charles, 2025
