= The King of Friday's Men =

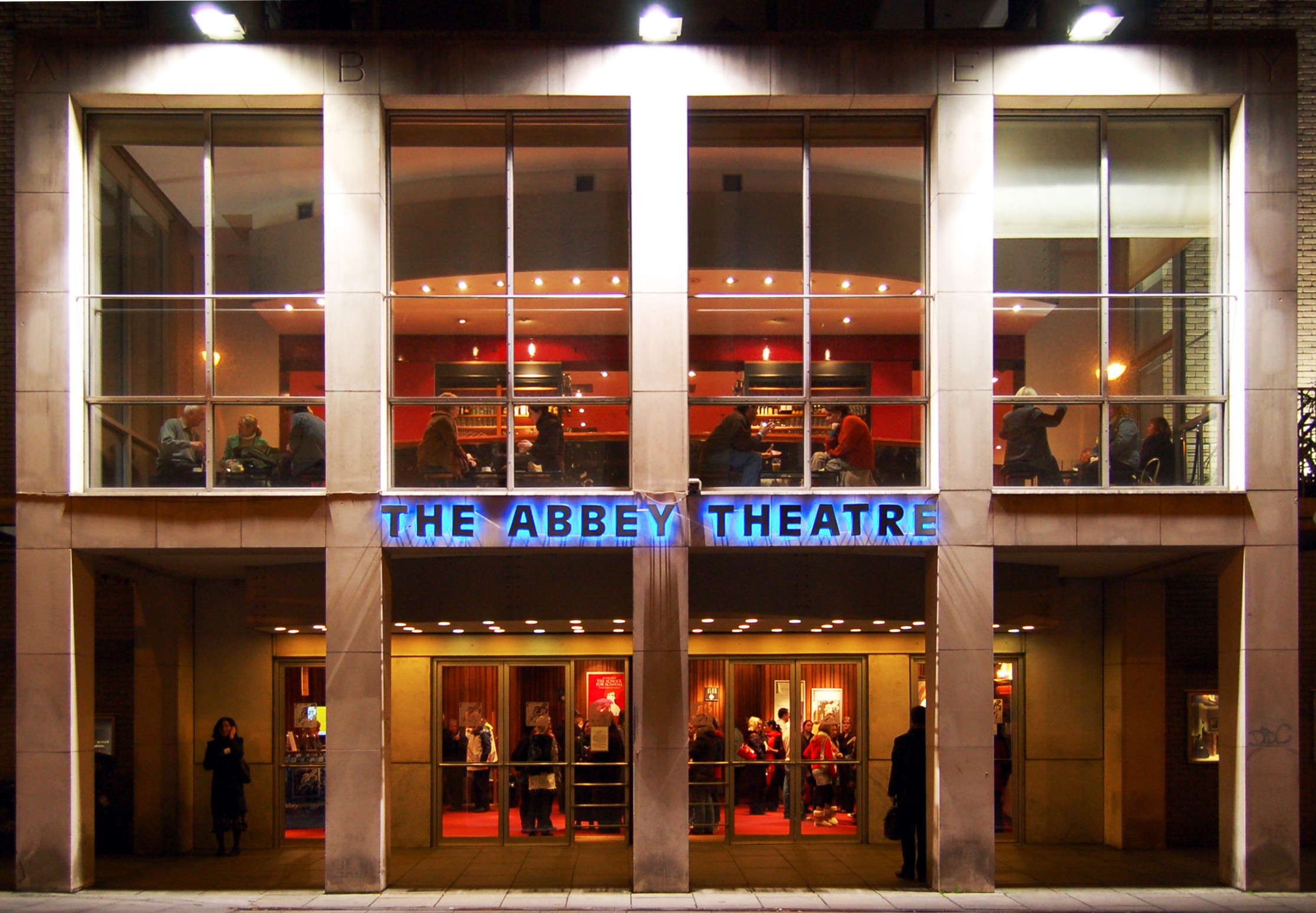
The Abbey Theatre in Ireland (2006)

King of Friday's Men (1948) is an Irish play in three acts by Michael Joseph (M.J.) Molloy and is considered his first masterpiece. The first production was on October 18, 1948, in the Abbey Theatre in Dublin, Ireland.

== Plot ==
The story is set in 1787, in Ireland, where a young woman, Una Brehony, is rescued by an aged man, Bartley Dowd, from an Anglo-Irish landlord, Caesar French, who sought her "for the first night" before she was marry her future husband, which was disturbing and frightful. Dowd, although an elderly man, is capable of fighting with the shillelagh or wooden walking stick in the process of rescuing her. The story has twist and turns as Brehony has actually used Dowd to rescue the man she actually loves, her future husband.

The play brings up the issue of claims that feudal lords had Droit du seigneur or lus primae noctis (right to the first night) from serfs in medieval Europe. Dowd beings to see himself a servant of the Christian messiah, one of the men of "The King of Friday's Men". An ancient prayer in Ireland refers to Jesus as "The King of Friday" due to his death on Good Friday.

== Abbey Theatre Productions ==
The show premiered at the Abbey Theatre in Dublin in 1948. The following year was the same production. The show then premiered in the United States.

== US Productions ==
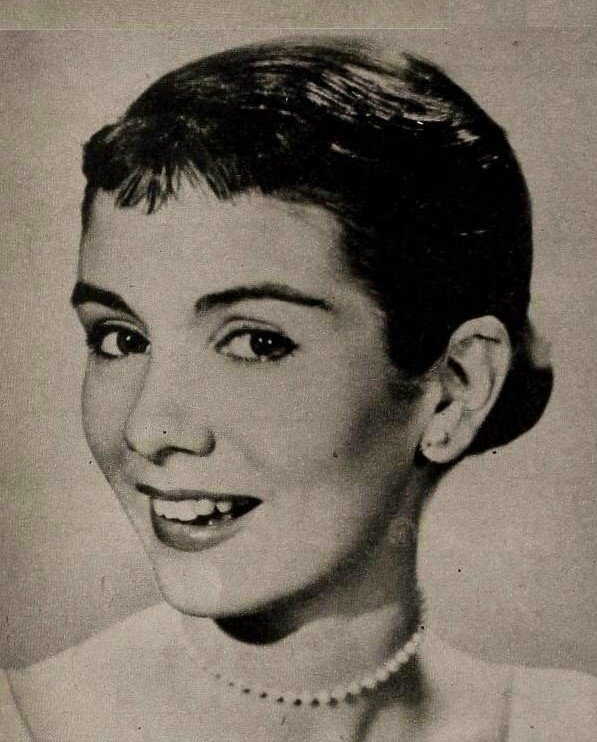
Maggie McNamara (1954) was in the 1951 Broadway production.

The show was at the McCarter Theater in Princeton, New Jersey in 1951 and then moved to the Broadway's Playhouse Theater later that year. John Burrell was originally the director and waived being in the program billing after he has been supplanted by David Alexander. Set design was by Stewart Chaney. Unfortunately, the show only lasted four performance on Broadway.

=== Cast for the Broadway Production (1951) ===
Maggie McNamara: Una Brehony

Sean McClory: Rory Commons

Walter Macken: Bartley Dowd.

The character of Bartley Dowd was first played in Ireland by author and actor Walter Macken, who also played the same character in the Broadway production in the US.

== Returning Back to the Abbey Theatre ==
The show returned to the stage of the Abbey Theatre for a 1952 production. Following that, there was a 1973 production with Sean Kenny as the theatre designer. Twelve years later, there was a 1985 production. Nineteen years after that, there was a 2004 production.

== Characters ==
Bartley Dowd: Aged gentleman who rescues Una Brehony and considers himself a servant of the Lord .

Una Brehony: The young lady who is rescued by Bartley Dowd

Rory Commons: The Landlord

== Book version of play ==
The play was later published as the book King of Friday's Men: A Play in Three Acts (1953)

== Reception ==
In one production of the show, a cast member described the play as follow:

“My character is a ‘tallywoman', she’s a lower class, single woman who is forced by her landlord to be his lover. It’s hard to stomach, but this is something that really went on. The fact that the situation is so repulsive to a modern audience shows how far we’ve come with women’s rights, but with all of the abuse and misconduct from high profile men that has come to light this year, it’s easy to see how far we have yet to go.”
