= Joseph Tanney =

American architect

- Born: 23 March 1961 (age 65); Chicago, Illinois, US
- Education: Ohio State University
- Occupation: Architect
- Awards: AIA Design Award, American Architecture Award
- Practice: Resolution: 4 Architecture
- Buildings: The Dwell Home
- Website: Official Website

Joseph Tanney (born March 23, 1961) is an American architect based in New York City. He is known for his work in prefabricated housing. He gained international attention with the Dwell Home, the winner of a 2003 international competition, which is considered a modern prefab icon.

Tanney is the principal and cofounder of Resolution: 4 Architecture, a New York firm known for its high-design modular architecture. He is the recipient of several AIA awards.

== Career ==
Tanney attended the Ohio State University, where he studied architecture under Charles Gwathmey and Peter Eisenman, obtaining his BA in 1984 and MA in 1987, and winning the award for outstanding leadership in the Ohio State architectural community.

After working in the offices of Eisenman Robertson and Gwathmey Siegel, Tanney founded his own architectural firm, Resolution: 4 Architecture (RES4), together with Robert Luntz in 1990. Most of their work consisted of transforming New York City lofts and apartments into modern spaces. In the wake of 9/11 attacks, however, the company had to lay off much of its staff, and Tanney started doing research into both academic and practical uses of prefab and modular houses built in factories.

In 2003, Tanney's design for a high-scale prefabricated home won the international competition of Dwell Magazine, seen as a 21st-century version of the Case Study Houses program. His Dwell Home was hailed as a resurgence of prefab, a "contemporary architecture for people who think they cannot afford architects". By 2008, his firm had built 25 prefab homes, becoming the leading modernist prefab company in the Northeast. By 2015, RES4 had built about 120 prefab houses, including over 60 single-family houses.

In 2013, Princeton Architectural Press published the book Modern Modular: The Prefab Houses of Resolution: 4 Architecture, written by Tanney and Luntz, with a preface by Allison Arieff. Tanney has been a lecturer and guest critic at numerous American universities and schools of architecture. He taught at City College in New York (2001–04), the University of Kentucky (2005-06), and was a visiting professor at Harvard University for their summer professional development program (2002–03). In 2013, he was Visiting Distinguished Professor of Architecture at City College of New York, Bernard and Anne Spitzer School of Architecture.

== Works ==
Tanney's most famous work is the Nathan Wieler and Ingrid Tung Home, better known as the Dwell House, in Pittsboro, North Carolina. He designed it for a 2003 competition to build a 2,000-square-foot house for no more than $200,000, excluding land, site work, and fees. Together with his partner Luntz, he came up with a series of rectangular "modules of use" to be combined in different ways to accommodate differing sites, needs and budgets. For the Dwell Home, one of these units was mounted atop another at right angles, adding various decks to connect the structure to the outdoors. Combining traditional wood framing with high-tech modular design, the Dwell Home became a modern prefab icon, and RES4 were hailed as modern prefab pioneers.

It became the basis for RES4's "Modern Modular", a method where dozens of predefined typologies are formed from a series of standard modules. All of such houses are constructed using a series of long, factory-built Lego-like boxes that are connected and finished on the site, so that there are no two houses that look the same. Tanney compared the method to the "customizable structure available in purchasing personal computers".

Another notable work is the "Bronx Box", the first modern prefab home in New York City, built in 2008. When Hurricane Sandy hit the area, the surrounding houses were devastated, but Bronx Box remained intact, with the owners staying inside through the whole crisis. The same disaster was survived by his Dune Road Beach House.

His Brown-Johnson cabin, also known as Lost River Modern, built in West Virginia in 2006, has been described as one of "stylish, higher-end houses designed by architects interested in homes that are built in a way that’s more labor and energy efficient and less wasteful than site-built houses".

== Awards and honors ==
Tanney has won several awards, including:

- 20th Annual Interiors Awards, Best Large Office, McCann-Erickson 16th Floor, 1999
- AIA Award, New York, Thunderhouse, 2000
- The American Architecture Award by the Chicago Athenaeum, 2005
- The Boston Society of Architects Honor Award for Design Excellence, 2006
- National AIA Housing Award for Concepts in Innovative Housing, 2006
- AIA Connecticut Design Merit Award for Pool House in Sharon, Connecticut, 2012

His houses in Lido Beach and Long Beach included in Arcadia/Suburbia: Architecture on Long Island, 1930–2010, the exhibition of the most significant modernist architecture on Long Island at the Heckscher Museum of Art in 2010.
