= Bring Yourself Back to Me =

"Bring Yourself Back To Me" is a song written by Don Gould (a former member of the 1960s group the Applejacks) and Lynsey de Paul (credited as her real name "Rubin") in 1971. It was recorded by Jack Wild and released as a track on his 1971 album, Everything's Coming Up Roses, which was produced by Brian Lane. The song was also released as the B-side to his 1971 single ""Everything's Coming Up Roses" that received a "Special Merit Spotlight" singles review in Billboard. In a review of both sides of the single, Record World stated "First for label packs plenty of teen appeal". It reached number seven on the Billboard Bubbling Under chart, as well as listed as being hit bound on KKAR radio. AllMusic lists the song as one of Jack Wild's song highlights. It is also listed in the books "The Directory of American 45 R.p.m. Records, Volume 2" "Goldmine Standard Catalog of American Records". According to "Do You Remember", the song is a fan favourite.
