= Flight of the Doves =

1971 Irish-British children's film by Ralph Nelson

- Film Poster
- Directed by: Ralph Nelson
- Written by: Frank Gabrielson; Ralph Nelson
- Based on: The Flight of the Doves; 1967 novel by Walter Macken
- Produced by: Ralph Nelson; William S. Gilmore
- Starring: Ron Moody; Jack Wild; Dorothy McGuire; Stanley Holloway; Noel Purcell; Dana Rosemary Scallon; Niall Tóibín; Brendan O'Reilly
- Cinematography: Harry Waxman
- Edited by: John Jympson
- Music by: Roy Budd
- Distributed by: Columbia Pictures
- Release dates: April 2, 1971 (USA); August 1, 1971 (UK)
- Running time: 101 minutes
- Country: United Kingdom
- Language: English

Flight of the Doves is a 1971 Irish-British Eastmancolor children's film directed by Ralph Nelson and starring Jack Wild, Dorothy McGuire and Stanley Holloway. It was written by Frank Gabrielson and Nelson, based on the 1967 novel of the same title by Irish writer Walter Macken. The film was based and filmed in Ireland.

== Premise ==
Two Liverpool children set out in search of love after many years of receiving abuse from their "Uncle" Toby Cromwell. Cromwell is stepfather to the Dove children, their mother having married Cromwell after the death of her first husband, the children's father. Cromwell was granted custody after her death.

Finn Dove and his sister Derval are tired of their stepfather's constant abuse and neglect, and they run away to Ireland to find their grandmother in County Galway. The children are unaware that they are heirs to their grandfather's estate and stand to inherit a large fortune, around $10,000 each, upon his death. However, if the children are either dead or missing, the money would go to their uncle "Hawk" Dove. Hawk Dove is an unsuccessful actor known for his temper and willingness to do just about anything to get what he wants. When Hawk discovers their fortune, he wants to make sure the Dove children never are seen again.

They arrive in Dublin on St Patrick's Day. The Dove children's journey across Ireland isn't easy, and they are discovered missing. Their stepfather had been informed of the inheritance (by Hawk disguised as a lawyer). Toby decides to bring in the police, and Hawk and Toby are close on their trail. The chase takes them to a St Patrick's Day parade, a synagogue, Dublin's Ha'penny Bridge, a travellers' encampment, and other places.

== Cast ==
- Ron Moody as John Cyril Dove - "Hawk" / Maxwell Perdon / DCI Wolcott / Miss Heather Marblestone / Dermot Corcoran
- Jack Wild as Finn Dove
- Dorothy McGuire as Mary Magdalene St. Bridget O'Flaherty - "Granny"
- Stanley Holloway as Judge Fenton Liffy
- Helen Raye as Derval Dove
- Willie Rushton as Tobias Cromwell, "Uncle Toby" (credited as William Rushton)
- Brendan O'Reilly as Insp. Michael Roark
- Dana as Sheila O'Ryan
- John Molloy as Mickser
- Noel Purcell as Rabbi
- Tom Hickey as Garda Pat Flynn
- Niall Tóibín as Sergeant O'Casey
- Barry Keegan as Powder O'Ryan
- Emmet Bergin as Paddy
- Robert Rietti as Irish airport TV reporter (voice)

== Production ==
=== Music ===
The film was scored by Roy Budd, who had made his film soundtrack debut in Ralph Nelson's previous film Soldier Blue. His score contains two songs: "You Don't Have to Be Irish to Be Irish", which is sung as the St Patrick's Day Parade song, and "The Far Off Place". The latter is sung by Dana, who plays the role of Sheila, an Irish Traveller, and the song is half in Irish and half in English. Both songs are about having dreams, reaching goals, and seeing "the far off place".

== Reception ==
The Monthly Film Bulletin wrote: "After Soldier Blue, Ralph Nelson here turns his erratic directorial talents to Gaelic whimsy, recounting the storybook adventures of two appealing children searching for that "far place" that features in the tinkers' nostalgic songs. The children's pursuit by a crew of comic grotesques (led by Ron Moody in some wild impersonations) involves a mixture of musical comedy, slapstick, and some droll, Blake Edwards-style, sidelong gags that dawdle on too long. The transitions in mood are perfunctory and grating, and the humour mechanical; and despite the evidence of the credits (Nelson as cowriter, producer and director), the film reveals little commitment or inspiration".
