= Resolution: 4 Architecture =

Architecture firm in New York City

- Company type: Private
- Industry: Architecture
- Founded: 1990
- Founder: Joseph Tanney, Robert Luntz
- Headquarters: New York, New York
- Website: www.re4a.com

Resolution: 4 Architecture (RES4) is a ten-person architecture firm based in New York City, founded by architects Joseph Tanney and Robert Luntz in 1990. The firm is most recognized for their work on prefabricated housing and mass customization of the single-family house.

In 2003, RES4 won the Dwell Home Design Invitational, an international competition for prefab housing design. RES4 has design over 120 prefab homes all over the United States using modular and panelized construction methods.

In 2013, Princeton University Press published a collection of RES4's works, titled "Modern Modular: The Prefab Houses of Resolution: 4 Architecture.

In 2018, Resolution: 4 Architecture's prefabricated homes were featured in an exhibit curated by Barry Bergdoll on Long Island titled, "A New Way of Modern Architecture on the North Fork."

== Modern Modular ==
RES4 began researching prefabricated construction when business declined in New York City after September 11th, with the goal of making modern homes more accessible to middle-class Americans.

In 2003, Resolution: 4 Architecture was invited to participate in the Dwell Home Design Invitational, an international design competition organized by Dwell magazine focused on innovative prefabricated housing. RES4 won the competition with their systematic design method, called Modern Modular, which used existing prefabrication processes with the intention to create custom modular homes at an affordable cost. RES4's concept sought to work within the existing constraints of factory construction with standard products and details, rather create a new fabrication process.

RES4's concept is that modules of can be composed in any number of ways for infinite home designs, each specific to a particular client and a particular site. RES4's design for the Dwell Home was an example of the Modern Modular, designed specifically for the homeowners and the site in Pittsboro, North Carolina.

In 2008, RES4 designed their first Modern Modular prefab home in an urban setting with the home named Bronx Box, located on a long, narrow lot in the Locust Point neighborhood of the Bronx. The 1800SF house was composed of two stacked 54-foot-long modules, built by Simplex Homes in Scranton, PA.
