= Eleanor Ruggles =

Eleanor Ruggles (1916–2008) was an American biographer and book reviewer. The 1955 film Prince of Players, starring Richard Burton as the 19th century American actor Edwin Booth was based on her book. She also wrote for Encyclopædia Britannica, including the page for Edwin Booth.

== Early life ==
Eleanor Ruggles was the daughter of Daniel Blaisdell Ruggles, a judge on the Nantucket circuit, and Alice (Morrill) Ruggles She grew up in Jamaica Plain and then Beacon Hill, and was educated at Winsor School, Boston. She earned a bachelor's degree in English and theater arts from Vassar College, graduating in 1938.

== Personal life ==
She married Robert Semmes O'Leary of New Orleans, a Harvard University faculty assistant, who was later an editor of the New England Medical Journal.

== Publications ==
- Gerard Manley Hopkins-A Life (1945)
- Journey Into Faith: The Anglican Life of John Henry Newman (1948)
- Prince of Players: Edwin Booth (1953)
- The West-going Heart: A Life of Vachel Lindsay (1959)
