= Now Take My Wife =

- Genre: Sitcom
- Starring: Sheila Hancock; Donald Houston; Liz Edmiston; Ruth Kettlewell
- No. of series: 1
- No. of episodes: 14

Original release
- Network: BBC1
- Release: 1 April – 6 December 1971

Now Take My Wife is a British television sitcom that broadcast one series of 14 episodes on BBC1 in 1971.

It starred Sheila Hancock and Donald Houston as a suburban middle-class couple, Claire and Harry Love. He would start each episode by turning to the camera and saying "Now ... take my wife" (except for one episode where they were supposed to be very drunk when he said "Now wake my tife").

They had a teenage daughter, played by Liz Edmiston (in real life in her mid-20s). Their next-door neighbour was an eccentric German woman (played by Ruth Kettlewell), who also had a daughter (played by Kate Brown).

Of the 14 episodes, two are currently missing from the BBC archives; they were either wiped to reuse the tapes or possibly lost at one stage after their first broadcast.

Several years later, in a Guardian interview, Hancock indicated that she was not very happy with the programme, seeing it as an example of the sort of stereotyped role for women actors she landed. However, her character often got the better of her husband during each episode.

== Cast ==
- Sheila Hancock – Claire Love
- Donald Houston – Harry Love
- Liz Edmiston – Jenny Love
- Ruth Kettlewell – Mrs. Wagner
- Kate Brown
- Ruth Meyers
- Eleanor Summerfield – Celia Fairweather
- Gordon Peters
- Lynne Frederick – Jenny Love
- Tony Beckley – Tom
- Lally Bowers – Lady Bunting
- Sam Kydd – Orlando Punt
- Geoffrey Palmer – Don Maxwell
- Jack Allen
- Colin Bean – Dirty Mackintosh Man
- George Benson
- Peter Clay
