= David Alexander (director) =

American television director

David Alexander (December 23, 1914 – March 6, 1983) was an American television director. He directed episodes of the CBS series The Best of Broadway and several popular 1960s television shows, including: My Favorite Martian, Petticoat Junction, Get Smart, The Munsters, F Troop and The Brady Bunch. He also directed two episodes of Star Trek: The Original Series: "Plato's Stepchildren" and "The Way to Eden".

On Broadway, he directed the 1952 revival of the musical Pal Joey. This production had the longest run of any revival of a musical in the history of the Broadway theatre at the time. In the previous year, he was the director of the Broadway production of The King of Friday's Men (1951).
