= Liz Edmiston =

British actress (1945–2008)

- Born: Elizabeth Edmiston; 21 May 1945; Gosport, Hampshire, England
- Died: 10 April 2008 (aged 62); On board the liner MV Oriana (1995)
- Occupation: Actress
- Years active: 1970–2008
- Spouse: Eric Carte (m. 1979)

Liz Edmiston (21 May 1945 – 10 April 2008) was a British actress.

== Early life and education ==
Edmiston was born in Gosport, Hampshire. She trained as a dancer at the Royal Ballet school at White Lodge, but after she was diagnosed with diabetes at age 13, she turned to acting instead.

== Career ==
Edmiston began her acting career on stage. In 1964 she toured in South America as part of the Shakespeare quatercentenary, performing with Ralph Richardson. She had roles in the West End, including in Funny Girl with Barbra Streisand, Little Me with Bruce Forsyth, and Mr and Mrs with John Neville and Honor Blackman. She also appeared in many trade show productions in the 1970s.

Edmiston appeared in several TV series including Sentimental Education (1970), Now Take My Wife (1971), Dickens of London (1976) and Forgotten (1999), and starred opposite Jack Wild in the 1973 film The 14. She also made appearances in episodes of Oh No It's Selwyn Froggitt! (1974) and Keeping Up Appearances (1993).

== Personal life ==
Edmiston married fellow actor Eric Carte in 1979. She received a kidney transplant in 1997. She died in 2008, while acting on board the liner MV Oriana (1995), at the age of 62.
