= Seek the Fair Land =

1959 Irish historical novel, beginning a trilogy, by Walter Macken

First edition

Seek the Fair Land is a novel by Irish author Walter Macken, first published by Macmillan and Company in 1959. It is the first book in his trilogy of Irish historical novels and was followed by The Silent People in 1962 and The Scorching Wind in 1964.

== Plot ==
The narrative takes place during the Cromwellian conquest of Ireland (1649–53). Dominick Macmahon's wife is killed during the Siege of Drogheda, in County Louth and after the ensuing massacre of the town's inhabitants he flees to the west of Ireland with his young son and daughter and a wounded priest, Father Sebastian. After two years of barely surviving Cromwell's marauding soldiers who are in search of peasants to sell as slaves, the group make it to the wild, mountainous and beautiful province of Connaught in the west of Ireland. There a clan-leader and sympathiser to their cause, Murdoc, grants them land on which to live. But danger continues to stalk them in the form of Sir Charles Coote, the Cromwellian ruler of Connaught. The ‘fair land’ sought by Macmahon seems as remote as ever, unless Murdoc and his clan can find some means of resisting the invading forces.

== Sequels ==
The Silent People (1962) follows a descendant of the family from around 1825 to the first years of the famine in Ireland, 1845 and 1846. The young educated man from Connacht is reluctantly drawn into the political unrest of the time.

The concluding book of the trilogy, The Scorching Wind (1964), deals with the events of the Anglo-Irish War, starting with the Easter Rising in 1916, and the beginning of the Irish Civil War, through the experiences of two brothers.

== Critical response ==
Seek the Fair Land received mostly positive reviews. On its release the New York Herald Tribune described the novel as ‘action-packed entertainment…an explosive segment of history, filled with contagious emotion.’ The Times Literary Supplement said of it: ‘It is an adventure story that is both exciting and moving.’ Kirkus Reviews described the novel as ‘an adventure story against a little known period and background. And the telling has the Irish lilt and poetry and drama, characteristic of Macken's earlier half-fey writings.’ The literary review website Reading Matters said: Macken's prose is vividly descriptive if the style is somewhat stodgy and old fashioned. But this does not take away from the dramatic storyline and the moving way in which he depicts his character's struggles against a despicable enemy.

== See also ==
List of Irish novelists
