= Home Is the Hero =

1959 Irish film by Fielder Cook

- Directed by: Fielder Cook
- Written by: Philip Howard; Henry Keating
- Based on: play by Walter Macken
- Produced by: Emmet Dalton
- Starring: Walter Macken
- Cinematography: Stanley Pavey
- Edited by: John Ferris
- Release date: 1959
- Running time: 83 minutes
- Country: Ireland
- Language: English

Home Is the Hero is a 1959 Irish drama film directed by Fielder Cook. It was entered into the 9th Berlin International Film Festival.

== Cast ==
- Walter Macken – Paddo O'Reilly
- Eileen Crowe – Daylia O'Reilly
- Arthur Kennedy – Willie O'Reilly
- Joan O'Hara – Josie O'Reilly
- Maire O'Donnell – Maura Green
- Harry Brogan – Dovetail
- Maire Keane – Bid
- Philip O'Flynn – Trapper
- Pat Layde – Mr. Green
- Eddie Golden – Mr. Shannon
- John Hoey – Finnegan
- Michael C. Hennessy – Manchester Monaghan
- Michael O'Brian – 1st Pub Customer
- Dermot Kelly – 2nd Pub Customer
