= Prince of Players =

1955 film by Philip Dunne

- Original film poster
- Directed by: Philip Dunne
- Written by: Moss Hart
- Based on: Prince of Players; 1953 book by Eleanor Ruggles
- Produced by: Philip Dunne
- Starring: Richard Burton; Maggie McNamara; John Derek; Raymond Massey; Charles Bickford; Elizabeth Sellars; Eva Le Gallienne
- Cinematography: Charles G. Clarke
- Edited by: Dorothy Spencer
- Music by: Bernard Herrmann
- Production company: 20th Century Fox
- Distributed by: 20th Century Fox
- Release date: January 11, 1955
- Running time: 102 min
- Country: United States
- Language: English
- Budget: $1,570,000
- Box office: $650,000 domestic rentals

Prince of Players is a 1955 20th Century Fox biographical film about the 19th century American actor Edwin Booth. The film was directed and produced by Philip Dunne from a screenplay by Moss Hart, based on the book by Eleanor Ruggles. The music score was by Bernard Herrmann and the cinematography by Charles G. Clarke. The film was made in CinemaScope and in DeLuxe Color.

The cast featured Richard Burton, Maggie McNamara and John Derek, along with Raymond Massey, Charles Bickford, Elizabeth Sellars and Eva Le Gallienne.

== Plot ==
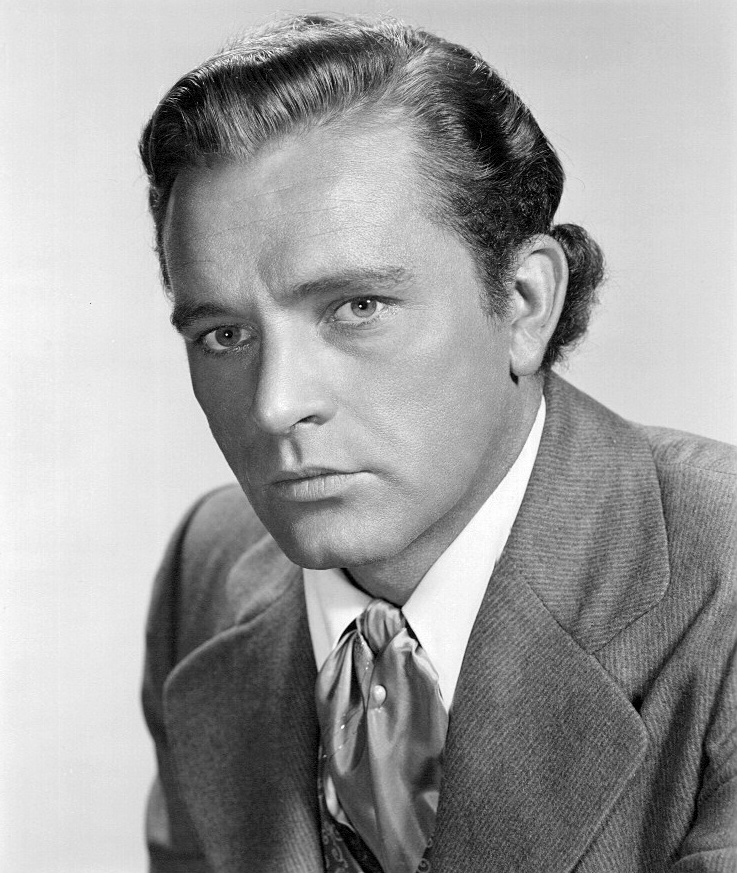
Richard Burton as Edwin Booth in Prince of Players

Edwin "Ned" Booth is the son of the noted thespian Junius Brutus Booth and the older brother of another actor, John Wilkes Booth. Beginning In 1848, as a boy, and into early manhood, he travels with and assists Junius, who is often drunk and seems at times on the brink of madness.

Several years go by. A theater owner, Dave Prescott, eagerly anticipates a Junius performance in San Francisco, but the actor is again unable to perform and decides to leave the theatrical run. Junius hands over his crown – a literal theatrical crown worn during his rendition of Richard III, to Ned, who has memorized his father's lines. Ned's first performance is of Richard III during a show at a mining camp, where the miners, disappointed at first, are ultimately pleased by what they see. Prescott, however, breaks the news shortly after that Junius has died.

Ned returns east, where John is starring in The Taming of the Shrew to great acclaim at Ford's Theatre in Washington, D.C. Billed as the son and successor to Junius, John is planning a tour and asks Ned if he will be his manager along with their younger sister, Asia Booth. Somewhat contemptuous of his upstart brother's early success as an actor, Ned declines. He tells his younger brother that he hasn't learned the craft the way he, Ned, has by traveling with, hearing the performances, and looking after their father for many years. Ned begins a theater tour of his own with Dave Prescott. He travels to New Orleans, where he meets, then soon marries, Mary Devlin, a member of a theatrical company who plays Juliet Capulet opposite Ned's role as Romeo Montague in a production of Romeo and Juliet.

The Civil War breaks out and John is said to be working steadfastly for the Confederacy's cause. He declines an offer from Ned to go to London together for a production of Hamlet, and when a pregnant Mary falls ill, Ned begins drinking heavily and missing performances.

Mary's death turns Ned morose. Then comes the terrible news one night that John has assassinated President Abraham Lincoln by gunshot at Ford's Theatre. Weeks after the assassination, and his brother's subsequent death on a farm in Virginia, Ned has decided to return to the stage in Hamlet. On opening night the theater is packed by a mob incensed by the murder of President Lincoln and blaming not only the Booths but all actors and theaters in general. One protester says Lincoln "died in the very doorway to hell" because he was murdered in a theater.

Backstage, Dave tells Ned that the show must be canceled. Ned insists that he wants to go on for his profession as well as his family name, remembering that the late Mary once said that acting was his gift, his purpose in life and he must "never be derelict" to that purpose.

Ned is seated center stage on the throne as the curtain comes up. The mob hurls insults, vegetables, and other objects at Ned as the other actors rush off the stage. Ned remains seated, immobile, and absorbs the abuse until the crowd's fury exhausts itself. Finally one of the protesters declares "he's got guts", shouts "Booth, you're alright!", and begins clapping.

Gradually more of the mob join him, the other actors return to the stage, and the film ends with Ned hearing the late Mary speaking part of Juliet's soliloquy as the crowd's approval continues to rise.

== Cast ==
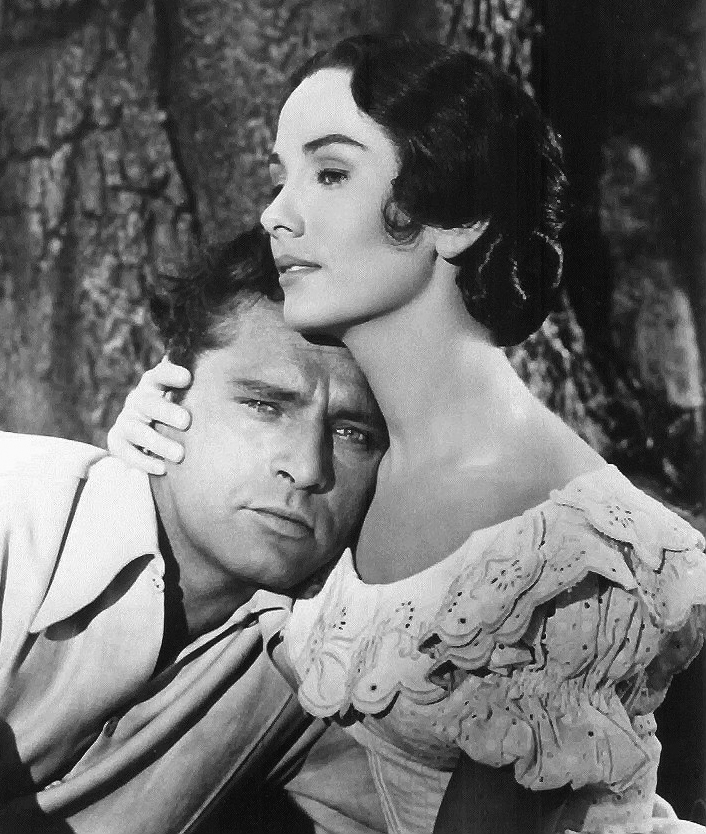
Richard Burton and Maggie McNamara in Prince of Players

- Richard Burton as Edwin "Ned" Booth
  - Christopher Cook as Young Edwin "Ned" Booth
- Maggie McNamara as Mary Devlin Booth
- John Derek as John Wilkes Booth
  - Louis Alexander as Young John Wilkes Booth
- Raymond Massey as Junius Brutus Booth
- Charles Bickford as Dave Prescott
- Elizabeth Sellars as Asia Booth
- Dayton Lummis as English physician
- Ian Keith as King Hamlet
- Paul Stader as Laertes
- William Walker as Old Ben
- Charles Cane as Theater Assistant
- Mae Marsh as Witch
- Stanley Hall as Abraham Lincoln
- Sarah Padden as Mary Todd Lincoln
- Ruth Clifford as English Nurse
- Ivan Hayes as Bernardo
- Paul Frees as Francisco
- Ben Wright as Horatio
- Melinda Markey as Young Lady
- Eleanor Audley as Mrs. Montchesington
- Percival Vivian as Polonius
- George Melford as Stage Doorman
- Ruth Warren as Nurse
- Richard H. Cutting as Doctor
- Lane Chandler as Colonel
- Steven Darrell as Major Henry Rathbone
- Tom Fadden as Trenchard
- Henry Kulky as Bartender
- Olan Soule as William Catesby
- Eva Le Gallienne as Queen Gertrude
- Jack Raine as Theater Manager
- Paul Wexler as Miner
- Ethan Laidlaw as Barfly
- Jack Mower as Man in Audience

== Production ==
=== Original book ===
The film was based on a book by Eleanor Ruggles, published in February 1953. She started researching it in 1948. The New York Times called it "an able biography." Another review in the same paper called it "enthralling". The book became a best seller.

=== Development ===
20th Century Fox bought the film rights in January 1953, before the book had been published. Richard Burton, who had a contract with the studio, was linked with the project from the beginning, although there were reports he might play John Wilkes Booth. Darryl F. Zanuck, head of Fox, reportedly wanted Laurence Olivier or Marlon Brando for Edwin Booth. Sol Siegel was the original producer. In May 1953 Moss Hart signed to write the script. In April 1953, Fox announced the film would be shot in CinemaScope.

Eventually Siegel dropped out as producer and was replaced by Philip Dunne. "Moss has done a really brilliant dramatisation of the book", said Dunne. In November 1953, Richard Burton signed a new seven-film contract with Fox, the first of which was to be the lead in Prince of Players. In June 1954, Jay Robinson was cast as John Wilkes Booth.

In July 1954, Eva Le Galliene was hired as technical consultant (listed on the credits as "Special Consultant on Shakespearean Scenes") on the recommendation of Moss Hart She later agreed to appear in the film as an actor playing Queen Gertrude in Hamlet, performing in scenes with Edwin (Burton) in character as Prince Hamlet. It was her first film. Dunne later said, "I couldn't find a director whom I thought could do justice to the script so Zanuck said 'direct it yourself'." In July Dunne was appointed director as well as producer. Jay Robinson lost the part of John Wilkes Booth to John Derek.

=== Shooting ===
Filming started August 1954. "On the first day, I was terrified", said Dunne. "There looking at me were Richard Burton, Raymond Massey, Eva Le Galliene and up walks Charlie Bickford, old, cantankerous, and known to punch out directors before breakfast.' Anyone here you want me to kick real hard?' old Charlie asked." Dunne said directing was "fun when you have a good story and players who know what they're supposed to do." Dunne later said Hart's script was about half an hour too long and that Dunne trimmed it by cutting within scenes.

== Reception ==
The film was a financial failure, the first movie in CinemaScope to lose money. Dunne said he thought "it was too larded with Shakespeare".

FilmInk argued "there’s great material here – Edwin Booth had a controlling father, a wife who died, a brother who shot Lincoln – but the material is treated like a musical biopic with renditions of Shakespeare instead of musical numbers (Burton recites the verse rather than acts it)."

== See also ==
- List of American films of 1955
