= The 14 =

1973 British film by David Hemmings

- Film poster
- Directed by: David Hemmings
- Written by: Roland Starke
- Produced by: Frank Avianca; Robert Mintz
- Starring: Jack Wild; June Brown
- Cinematography: Ousama Rawi
- Edited by: John Shirley
- Music by: Kenny Clayton
- Production company: Avianca Productions (London) Ltd
- Distributed by: MGM-EMI
- Release date: 19 December 1973
- Running time: 105 minutes
- Country: United Kingdom
- Language: English

The 14 (also known as Existence; U.S. title: The Wild Little Bunch) is a 1973 British drama film directed by David Hemmings and starring Jack Wild and June Brown. It was written by Roland Starke.

Its plot, based on fact, concerns the fate of fourteen children in west London who are orphaned after the death of their single mother.

== Plot ==
The film focuses on a family of fourteen children who are left to fend for themselves when their mother passes away. Reg, the eldest who is turning 18, is left in charge of the family until the child welfare come in and send them all to a children's home. However, Reg is always determined to fight to keep his family together no matter what.

== Cast ==
- Jack Wild as Reg
- June Brown as the mother
- Liz Edmiston as Sylvia
- Diana Beevers as Miss Field
- Cheryl Hall as Reena
- Anna Wing as Mrs. Booth
- John Bailey as Mr. Sanders
- Alun Armstrong as Tommy
- Keith Buckley as Mr. Whitehead
- Tony Calvin as Father Morris
- Chris Kelly as Roy (as Christian Kelly)
- Frank Gentry as Terry
- Peter Newby as Billy
- Paul Daly as Freddy
- Richard Haywood as John (as Richard Heyward)
- Malcolm Tierney as Mr. Michael

== Production ==
The film was shot on location in west London and Berkshire and at Pinewood Studios, London, England.

== Release ==
The film won the Silver Bear at the 23rd Berlin International Film Festival.

== Critical reception ==
The Monthly Film Bulletin wrote: "The 14 is largely concerned to tell it straight, short on sentiment and with barely a trace of fake moralising concern. ... Everyone officially involved with this extraordinary family emerges sympathetically, from the hard-pressed and utterly dedicated social workers to the harassed priest watching the little monsters disrupt the orderly calm of his children's home, and even the professional foster-mother, pelted with her mashed potato as she lectures her unruly brood on good manners. These fourteen children were obviously a very wild bunch, and the film doesn't pretend otherwise. ... David Hemmings, directing his second film, has mostly evaded the dangers implicit in this misfits-as-heroes approach, though there are times when the difference between the real children and the screen children turns them into mere lovable rogues. ... [Although] the film does well enough on its own terms, it might have done better within a documentary framework"

Variety wrote: "Far from the oversentimental tearjerker it could easily have become, pic – which is based on a real-life story – emerges as a terse, intermittently humorous yet ultimately moving tale of the struggle of a 14-child family whose father and later mother both die, to work their united way against adversity and into society. ... Uncompromisingly, Roland Stark's script and actor David Hemmings' direction ... refuse to let the kids become cute or winning: to the contrary. ... Acting is good throughout, with Jack Wild getting more individual chances than the rest, and doing his job well. ... Technical credits on the all-location (or almost) pic are fine, with only an obtrusive, over-insistent musical score providing a jarring note."
