= Jerrilynn Dodds =

American art historian

Jerrilynn Dodds OMC
- Born: February 11, 1951 (age 75)
- Children: 2
- Awards: Guggenheim Fellowship; Orden del Mérito Civil

Academic background
- Education: Harvard University (MA, PhD); Barnard College (BA)

Academic work
- Discipline: Art history
- Sub-discipline: Medieval Studies, Religious Studies, Islamic Art
- Institutions: Columbia University; City College of New York; Metropolitan Museum of Art; Sarah Lawrence College; University of Oxford
- Notable works: The Arts of Intimacy (2008); NY Masjid: The Mosques of New York (2002); Architecture and Ideology in Early Medieval Spain (1990)
- Notable ideas: La Convivencia

Jerrilynn Denise Dodds OMC is an American art historian and curator. She currently holds the Harlequin Adair Dammann Chair in Islamic Studies at Sarah Lawrence College, where she previously served as Dean of the College and Chief Academic Officer. Her publications include Architecture and Ideology in Early Medieval Spain (1990); NY Masjid: The Mosques of New York (2002); and The Arts of Intimacy: Christians, Jews, and Muslims in the Making of Castilian Culture (2008), which was named a Times Literary Supplement Book of the Year, and most recently, Visual Histories from Medieval Iberia. Arts and Ambivalence (2024).

From 1992 to 2007 Dodds worked as a consultant, curator, and lecturer at the Metropolitan Museum of Art. In 2020 she was named Slade Professor of Fine Art at the University of Oxford.

== Biography ==
Dodds received her B.A. in Art History from Barnard College, Columbia University and her M.A. and Ph.D. in the History of Art and Architecture from Harvard University.

From 1980 - 1989 she was as an assistant professor in the Department of Art History and Archaeology at Columbia University. From 1989 - 2009 she was a Distinguished Professor of Architecture and Theory at The Bernard and Anne Spitzer School of Architecture, where she also served as Senior Faculty Advisor to the Provost for Undergraduate Education. From 2009 - 2015 she served as the Dean of Sarah Lawrence College, where he currently holds the Harlequin Adair Dammann Chair in Islamic Studies. Throughout much of her career, Dodds research has focused on transculturation and artistic interchange between Christians, Muslims, and Jews in Medieval Spain.

Her publications include Architecture and Ideology in Early Medieval Spain (1990); NY Masjid: The Mosques of New York (2002); and, as co-author, The Arts of Intimacy: Christians, Jews, and Muslims in the Making of Castilian Culture (2008), which was named a Times Literary Supplement Book of the Year, and Visual Histories from Medieval Iberia. Arts and Ambivalence (2024).

In addition to her academic work, Dodds served as a consultant, curator, and lecturer at the Metropolitan Museum of Art. Select exhibitions include Al Andalus: The Arts of Islamic Spain, The Arts of Medieval Spain, and Convivencia: The Arts of Jews, Christians and Muslims in Medieval Iberia. Also a prolific filmmaker, Dodds directed four documentaries for the Met, including Journey to St. James: A Pilgrim's Guide (1993), An Imaginary East (1995), NY Masjid (1996), and Hearts and Stones: The Bridge at Mostar (2004). Her films have been awarded two MUSE Awards from New York Women in Film & Television, as well as the 1995 Cine Golden Eagle Award for Best Documentary Film.

In 2016 Dodds was awarded a Guggenheim Fellowship in Fine Arts Research. In 2017, she was awarded the Slade Professorship of Fine Art at the University of Oxford for the 2020–2021 academic year. In 2018, she was knighted by the Felipe VI of Spain, and inducted into the Orden del Mérito Civil. Jerrilynn Dodds (Art History) | Faculty at Sarah Lawrence CollegeJerrilynn Dodds | Ediciones Complutense

== Publications ==
- Visual Histories from Medieval Iberia. Arts and Ambivalence (Arc Humanities Press, 2024)
- The Arts of Intimacy: Christians, Jews, and Muslims in the Making of Castilian Culture (Yale University Press, 2008)
- NY Masjid: The Mosques of New York (PowerHouse Books, 2002)
- The Art of Medieval Spain, A.D. 500–1200 (The Metropolitan Museum of Art, 1993)
- Al Andalus: The Arts of Islamic Spain (The Metropolitan Museum of Art, 1992)
- Convivencia: The Arts of Jews, Christians and Muslims in Medieval Iberia (George Braziller, Inc. 1992)
- Architecture and Ideology in Early Medieval Spain (Penn State University Press, 1990)
