= Forgotten (TV series) =

- Genre: Crime drama
- Written by: Caleb Ranson
- Directed by: Ben Bolt
- Starring: Paul McGann; Amanda Burton; Zara Turner; Karis Copp; Kathryn Howden; Tim Faraday; Ian Hogg; Adrian Rawlins
- Composer: Rob Lane
- Country of origin: United Kingdom
- Original language: English
- No. of series: 1
- No. of episodes: 3

Production
- Executive producer: Laura Mackie
- Producer: Cameron McAllister
- Cinematography: Gavin Finney
- Editor: Frances Parker
- Running time: 50 minutes
- Production company: LWT

Original release
- Network: ITV
- Release: 15 February – 1 March 1999

Forgotten is a three-part British television drama series, created and written by playwright Caleb Ranson, that first broadcast on ITV on 15 February 1999, it was produced by LWT for the ITV network. The series stars Paul McGann and Amanda Burton, and follows Ben Turner (McGann), a happily-married father to a six-year-old daughter, whose life is turned upside down by the arrival of a letter in the mail, whose writer claims to have information relating to his involvement in a murder several years earlier. Events are further complicated when Rachel Monroe (Burton), the mother of the victim, arrives at Turner's bed & breakfast in an attempt to discover the truth behind the crime.

The series broadcast over three consecutive nights, with the concluding episodes following on 22 February and 1 March 1999. The first episode drew 12 million viewers, while the second attracted 11.2 million, and the final episode attracted 11.9 million. The series aired as part of PBS' Mystery! strand in the United States, and was released on Region 1 DVD on 2 October 2001; however, this title is now out of print. The series is yet to be released on Region 2 DVD.

== Production ==
Amanda Burton, when interviewed by PBS regarding her role as Rachel Monroe, commented: "Rachel can be mischievous... I must admit that it's nice being a bit wicked or devilish as Rachel."

== Reception ==
Larisa Lomacky Moore for Amazon.com wrote; "The end is guaranteed to surprise and disturb even the most astute armchair detective."

== Cast ==
- Paul McGann as Ben Turner
- Amanda Burton as Rachel Monroe
- Zara Turner as Natalie Turner
- Karis Copp as Emmy Turner
- Kathryn Howden as DCI Parris
- Tim Faraday as DS Harding
- Ian Hogg as Ch. Supt. Dexter Alan
- Adrian Rawlins as Oliver Fraser
- Geraldine Alexander as Stella Cannon
- Christopher Villiers as Andrew Cannon
- Gwyneth Strong as Denise Longden
- Mark Bagnall as Robin
- Lloyd McGuire as Ed
- Anna Keaveney as Eileen
- Edward Jewesbury as Bernard Clivedon
- Liz Edmiston as Alma Todd
- Sally Faulkner as Mrs. Arthur

== Episodes ==
No.	Title	Directed by	Written by	Airdate	UK viewers (million)
1	"Episode 1"	Ben Bolt	Caleb Ranson	15 February 1999	12.00
Rachel Monroe, still grieving for the daughter snatched from her by a murderer 15 years previously, persists in blaming a happily married second-hand book dealer for the crime, even though he has always maintained his innocence.
2	"Episode 2"	Ben Bolt	Caleb Ranson	22 February 1999	11.20
3	"Episode 3"	Ben Bolt	Caleb Ranson	1 March 1999	11.90
