= Lara Hedberg Deam =

American magazine founder

Lara Hedberg Deam (born 1967) is the founder of architecture and design magazine Dwell.

== Background ==
Hedberg was raised in Janesville, Wisconsin, United States, and is the daughter of Don and Gerry Hedberg, who are the founders of Lab Safety Supply. After her family sold the company, Hedberg involved herself in philanthropy. When she moved to Mill Valley, California, in 1994, Hedberg's experience in renovating her house inspired her to found the magazine.

She is married to Christopher Deam, and has twins born in 2003.
