= Jack Wild =

English actor and singer (1952–2006)

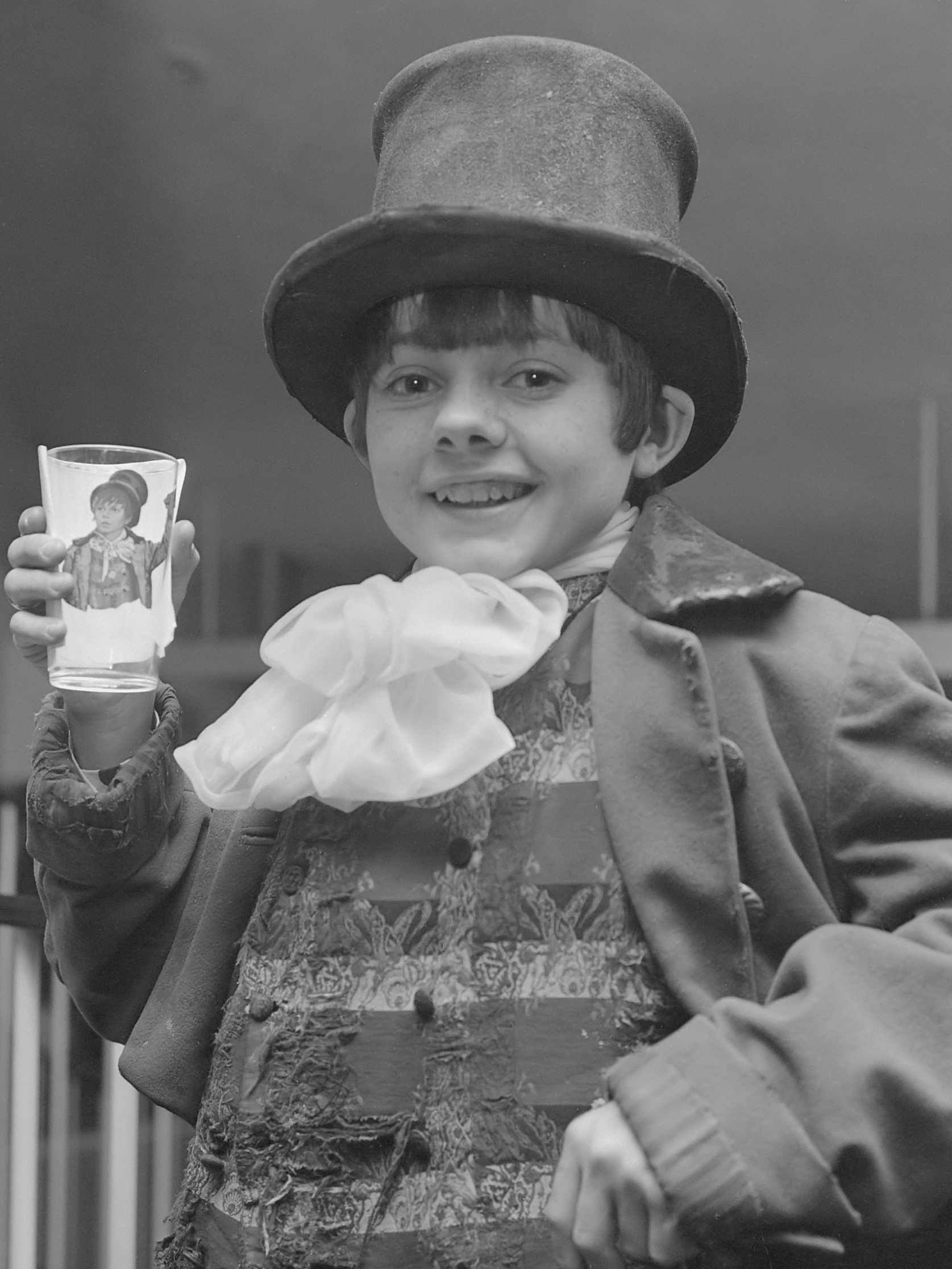
- Wild as the Artful Dodger in Oliver! (1968)
- Born: 30 September 1952; Royton, Lancashire, England
- Died: 1 March 2006 (aged 53); Tebworth, Bedfordshire, England
- Resting place: Toddington Parish Cemetery
- Occupations: Actor; singer
- Years active: 1964–2005
- Spouses: Gaynor Jones (m. 1976; div. 1985); Claire Harding (m. 2005)

Jack Wild (30 September 1952 – 1 March 2006) was an English actor and singer. He is best known for his role as the Artful Dodger in the film Oliver! (1968), for which he received an Academy Award nomination for Best Supporting Actor at the age of 16. As of 2026, Wild is the fourth-youngest nominee in the category. He also received BAFTA Award and Golden Globe Award nominations for the role.

Wild also starred in the television series H.R. Pufnstuf (1969) and its film adaptation Pufnstuf (1970), as well as in the films Melody (1971) and Robin Hood: Prince of Thieves (1991).

== Early life and education ==
Wild was born into a working-class family in Royton, Lancashire, on 30 September 1952. In 1960, at the age of eight, with his parents and his elder brother Arthur, he moved to Hounslow, in Middlesex, where he got a job helping a milkman, which paid about five shillings. While playing football with his brother in the park, he was discovered by theatrical agent June Collins, mother of Phil Collins. June Collins enrolled both Jack and Arthur at the Barbara Speake Stage School, an independent school in Acton, west London.

== Acting career ==
=== Oliver! ===
Jack Wild (right) with Oliver! co-star Mark Lester at the 41st Academy Awards, 14 April 1969

The Wild brothers sought acting roles to supplement their parents' income. In the autumn of 1964, the pair were cast in the West End theatre production of Lionel Bart's Oliver! – Arthur in the title role and Jack as Charley Bates, a member of Fagin's gang. Wild was chosen to play the Artful Dodger for the 1968 movie version of Oliver! His performance received critical acclaim and several nominations:

- Academy Award for Best Supporting Actor – nominated at the 41st Academy Awards
- Golden Globe Award for Most Promising Newcomer – nominated at 26th Golden Globe Awards
- BAFTA Award for Most Promising Newcomer – nominated at 22nd British Academy Film Awards

=== TV work ===
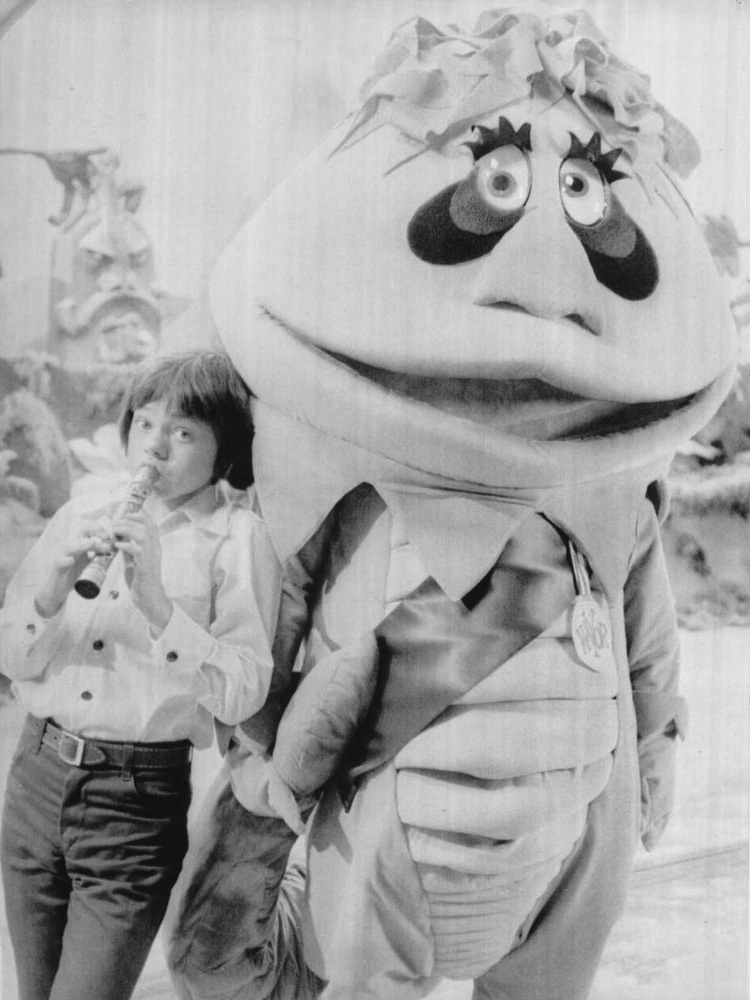
Wild with the title character in the NBC children's series H.R. Pufnstuf, 1969

In the spring of 1966, Wild left the stage show of Oliver! to make the film serial Danny the Dragon for the Children's Film Foundation. Wild's first speaking roles on TV were in an episode of Out of the Unknown, and in the third part of the BBC's version of the Wesker trilogy, I'm Talking About Jerusalem. He also appeared in episodes of Z-Cars, The Newcomers, and George and the Dragon.

=== After Oliver! ===
At the 1968 premiere of Oliver!, Wild met brothers Sid and Marty Krofft, who thought he would make a good lead for a show they were developing called H.R. Pufnstuf. Wild starred as Jimmy in Pufnstuf's only season (1969), as well as in the film Pufnstuf (1970), which was released shortly after the show concluded.

Wild then appeared in Melody (1971, with Oliver! co-star Mark Lester) and Flight of the Doves (1971, with another Oliver! co-star, Ron Moody). In 1972, Wild appeared as a stowaway in an episode of BBC TV's The Onedin Line. In 1973, he played Reg in The 14, a film directed by David Hemmings. On television, Wild appeared in a BBC adaptation of Our Mutual Friend in 1976. In 1999, Wild lamented,

"When I first entered in the show business, of course I didn't mind playing younger roles. However, it did bug me when I would be 21 being offered the role of a 13-year-old. I'm not saying I didn't enjoy playing these roles; I had barrels of fun, I just wanted more serious and dramatic roles; it's that simple."

He also embarked on a recording career, releasing The Jack Wild Album for Capitol Records, which contained the single "Some Beautiful". In the early 1970s, Wild also released the albums Everything's Coming Up Roses and Beautiful World for Buddah Records.

=== Later career ===
Wild returned to the big screen in a few minor roles, such as in the 1991 Kevin Costner film Robin Hood: Prince of Thieves and as a peddler in Basil (1998). For the most part, he spent the remainder of his career working in theatre. Wild's last major appearance was as the male lead, Mouse, in Tayla Goodman's rock musical Virus. The show ran for two weeks at the Theatre Royal, Nottingham, in 1999. For his final film appearance, he had a minor role in Moussaka & Chips (2005), in which he once again worked with Ron Moody.

== Personal life ==
Wild first met Welsh-born actress Gaynor Jones when they were around 12 years old at the Barbara Speake stage school. After he left in 1966, he did not see her again until Christmas 1970. They married on 14 February 1976. She left him in 1985 because of his chronic drinking. Wild met his second wife, Claire Harding, when he was working with her in Jack and the Beanstalk in Worthing. They married in Bedford in September 2005.

In 2001, Wild was diagnosed with oral cancer; he blamed the disease on his drinking and smoking habits. He underwent chemotherapy immediately, and had his tongue and voice box removed in July 2004, leaving him unable to speak. Wild had to communicate through his wife for the rest of his life.

=== Alcoholism ===
By age 21, Wild was an alcoholic. After exhausting his remaining fortune, he lived with his retired father for a few years. His alcoholism caused three cardiac arrests and resulted in numerous hospital stays. He was diagnosed with diabetes on 14 March 1983. His alcoholism ruined both his career and first marriage, as his wife left him in 1985 because of his drinking.

During the mid-1980s, he often drank three to four bottles of vodka a week, and typically drank half a bottle of vodka and two bottles of wine every day. He later admitted his alcoholism was so debilitating that he was incapable of performing any kind of work. He once attended a drying-out clinic for drug addicts and alcoholics, run by Pete Townshend, but after being "dry" for six weeks, he bought a bottle of champagne to celebrate that he had stopped drinking. Wild eventually became sober on 6 March 1989, after joining a support group, Alcoholics Victorious.

== Death and legacy ==
Wild was 53 when he died of oral cancer on 1 March 2006. He is buried in Toddington Parish Cemetery, Bedfordshire. He was unable to speak for the last two years of his life following the operation in which his vocal cords and part of his tongue were removed. His gravestone has musical notation carved on it, showing the first few bars of "The Entertainer" by Scott Joplin.

At the time of his death, he and his wife had been working on his autobiography. She said: "All the material was there when Jack died, it just needed rearranging, editing, and in certain sections, writing out from transcripts Jack and I made as we recorded him talking about his life." The book, It's a Dodger's Life, was published in 2016 with a foreword by Pufnstuf co-star Billie Hayes, an afterword by Clive Francis, and an epilogue by Wild's wife.

== Filmography ==
List of acting performances in film and television
Title	Year	Alternate titles	Role	Notes
Poor Cow	1967		Boy Playing Football [Wearing Hat]	Uncredited
Danny the Dragon	1967		Gavin	
Oliver!	1968		The Artful Dodger	First film to act alongside Mark Lester and Ron Moody; Nominated – Academy Award for Best Supporting Actor; Nominated – BAFTA Award for Most Promising Newcomer; Nominated – Golden Globe Award for Most Promising Newcomer
H.R. Pufnstuf	1969		Jimmy	TV series, 1 Season, 17 Episodes (Segment: H.R. Pufnstuf; 2 episodes unreleased)
Pufnstuf	1970	Pufnstuf Zaps the World	Jimmy	
Melody	1971	S.W.A.L.K.	Ornshaw	Second and last film to act alongside Mark Lester
Flight of the Doves	1971		Finn Dove	Second film to act alongside Ron Moody
The Pied Piper	1972		Gavin	
The Onedin Line	1972		Peter Thompson	Season 2, Episode 3
The 14	1973	Existence (USA); The Wild Little Bunch (USA)	Reg	
Sigmund and the Sea Monsters	1973		Himself	Guest appearance
Keep It Up Downstairs	1976		Peregrine Cockshute	
Everyday Maths	1978		Mike Selby	BBC Schools and Colleges
The Ravelled Thread	1979-1980		Gegor	
Alice	1982		Mock Turtle	
Robin Hood: Prince of Thieves	1991		Much the Miller's Son	
Basil	1998		Peddler	
Lock, Stock...	2000		Bill Bishop	Episode 4: Lock, Stock and Spaghetti Sauce
Moussaka & Chips	2005		Durgen Fleece	Third film to act alongside Ron Moody; final film role

== Discography ==
=== Albums ===
- The Jack Wild Album (1970)

A1 "Sugar and Spice"
A2 "Early in the Morning"
A3 "Fish And Chips"
A4 "Some Beautiful"
A5 "A Picture of You"
B1 "Wait For Summer"
B2 "Maxwell's Silver Hammer"
B3 "Melody"
B4 "When I'm Sixty-Four"
B5 "Lazy Sunday"

- Everything's Coming Up Roses (1971)

A1 "(Holy Moses!) Everything's Coming Up Roses"
A2 "The Pushbike Song"
A3 "Cotton Candy"
A4 "Bring Yourself Back To Me"
A5 "Hello (Jack)"
B1 "The Old Man Song (Na Na Na Na)"
B2 "Apeman"
B3 "Takin' It Easy"
B4 "Ob-La-Di, Ob-La-Da"
B5 "What Have They Done to My Song Ma"

- A Beautiful World (1972)

A1 "A Beautiful World"
A2 "Punch and Judy"
A3 "Sweet Sweet Lovin'"
A4 "Bird in the Hand"
A5 "The Lord"
B1 "Beggar Boy"
B2 "Songs of Freedom"
B3 "Being With You"
B4 "E.O.I.O."
B5 "Bunny Bunny"

=== Singles ===
The Jack Wild Album

List of singles, with selected chart positions
Title	Year	Peak chart positions		Album
Title	Year	UK	US	Album
"Some Beautiful"	1970	46	92	The Jack Wild Album
"Wait For Summer"	1970	-	115	The Jack Wild Album
"Melody"	1970	-	-	The Jack Wild Album and Melody (Soundtrack)
"Working On It Night and Day"	1971	-	-	Melody (Soundtrack)
"(Holy Moses!) Everything's Coming Up Roses"	1971	-	107	Everything’s Coming Up Roses
"Cotton Candy" (Japan only)	1971	-	-	Everything’s Coming Up Roses
"Punch and Judy"	1972	-	-	A Beautiful World
"I Need More Loving"	1973	-	-	Non-album single
"Universal Song"	1974	-	-	Non-album single
"—" denotes releases that did not chart.

== See also ==
- List of British actors
- List of oldest and youngest Academy Award winners and nominees – Youngest nominees for Best Actor in a Supporting Role
- List of British Academy Award nominees and winners
- List of actors with Academy Award nominations

== Bibliography ==
- Wild, Jack. Autobiography: It's A Dodger's Life, Fantom Films 2016. Hardback edition ISBN 978-1-78196-266-4
- Holmstrom, John. The Moving Picture Boy: An International Encyclopaedia from 1895 to 1995, Norwich, Michael Russell, 1996, p. 296. ISBN 978-0859551786
- Dye, David. Child and Youth Actors: Filmography of Their Entire Careers, 1914-1985. Jefferson, NC: McFarland & Co., 1988, p. 239. ISBN 9780899502472
