= Paul L. Edmiston =

American chemistry professor

Paul Edmiston is a professor of chemistry at The College of Wooster in Wooster, Ohio.

== Education ==
Edmiston received a B.S. from Pepperdine University in 1993 and his Ph.D. from University of Arizona in 1997. Since that time, Edmiston has taught and researched at the College of Wooster and published and co-published over 25 articles.

== Discovery of Osorb ==
Edmiston is known for his discovery of Osorb. His work is specialized in the study and engineering of nanotechnology. During tests with his students, an undergraduate by the name of Colleen Burkett noted a very unusual characteristic in the particular glass she was using. This glass, later trademarked Osorb, swelled to absorb acetone added to the substance drop-wise. After Burkett showed Edmiston the reaction, Osorb became the focus of his studies.

== Awards and recognition ==
Edmiston and his work have been recognized by the Chronicle of Higher Education, The Wooster Daily Record, Crain Communications, and local news stations.

With his work, his company has been awarded over seven grants and loans:

- 2009 (July 23) NEOinc Innovation Fund Award
- 2009 NorTech Materials Science Innovation of the Year
- 2009 National Science Foundation Advanced Engineering Research Grant. Awarded to ABSMaterials and the College of Wooster
- 2009 (May 7) MIT Clean Energy Prize: Won by wholly owned subsidiary, Produced Water Absorbent (PWA)
- 2010 National Science Foundation SBIR
- 2010 Department of Energy SBIR
- 2010 National Science Foundation RAPID Grant

== Publications ==
A list of Edmiston's publications to date taken from the College of Wooster website are copied below:

- Edmiston, P. L.; Underwood, L. A. Absorption of Dissolved Organic Species from Water Using Organically Modified Silica that Swells. Separation and Purification Technology (2009) in press.
- Burkett, C. M.*; Underwood, L. A.*, Volzer, R. S.*; Baughman, J. A.*; Edmiston, P. L. Organic-Inorganic Hybrid Materials that Rapidly Swell in Non-Polar Liquids: Nanoscale Morphology and Swelling Mechanism. Chemistry of Materials 20, 1312-1321 (2008).
- Jourden, M. J.*; Clarke, C. N.*; Palmer, A. K.*; Barth, E. J.*; Prada, R. C.*; Hale, R. N.*; Fraga, D. Snider, M. J.; Edmiston, P. L. Changing the Substrate Specificity of Creatine Kinase from Creatine to Glycocyamine: Evidence for a Highly Evolved Active Site”Biochim. Biophys. Acta, 1774, 1519-1527 (2007).
- Walker, N. R.*; Linman M. J.*; Timmers, M. M.*; Dean S. L.*; Burkett, C. M.*; Lloyd, J. A.*; Keelor, J. D.*; Baughman, B. M.*; Edmiston, P. L.. Selective Detection of Gas-Phase TNT by Integrated Optical Waveguide Spectrometry Using Molecularly Imprinted Sol-Gel Sensing Films. Analytica Chimica Acta, 593, 82-91 (2007).
- Ohren, J. F.; Kundracik, M. L.*; Borders, C. L.; Edmiston P. L.; and Viola R. E. Structural Asymmetry and Intersubunit Communication in Muscle Creatine Kinase. Acta Crystallogr. D63, 381-389 (2007).
- Carlson, C. A.*; Lloyd, J. A.*; Dean, S. L.*; Walker, N. R.*, Edmiston, P. L. Sensor for Fluorene Based on the Incorporation of an Environmentally Sensitive Fluorophore Proximal to a Molecularly Imprinted Binding Site, Anal. Chem., 78 (11), 3537 -3542 (2006).
- Burkett, C. M.*; Edmiston P. L.; Highly Swellable Sol-Gels Prepared by Chemical Modification of Silanol Groups Prior to Drying. J Non-Crystalline Solids, 351, 3174-3178 (2005).
- Jourden, M. J.*; Geiss, P.*; Thomenius, M. J.*; Horst, L. A.*; Barty, M. M.*; Brym, M. J.*; Mulligan, G.B.*; Almeida, R.M.*; Kersteen, E.A.*; Myers, N.R.*; Snider, M. J.; Borders Jr., C. L.; Edmiston, P.L.; Transition State Stabilization by Six Arginines Clustered in the Active Site of Creatine Kinase. Biochim. Biophys. Acta, 1751, 178-183 (2005).
- Cox, J. M.*, Davis, C. A.*, Chan, C.*, Jourden, M. J.*, Jorjorian, A. D.*, Brym, M. J.*, Snider, M. J., Borders, Jr., C. L., Edmiston, P. L. Generation of an Active Monomer of Rabbit Muscle Creatine Kinase by Site-Directed Mutagenesis: The Effect of Quaternary Structure on Catalysis and Stability. Biochemistry 42, 1863-1871 (2003).
- Borders, C. L.; MacGregor, K. M.*; Edmiston, P. L.; Gbeddy, E. R. K.*; Thomenius, M. J.*; Mulligan, G. B.*; Snider, M. J. Creatine Kinase: Asparagine 285 Plays a Key Role in Transition State Stabilization and Determination of the Catalytic Mechanism. Protein Sci. 12, 532-537 (2003).
- Lloyd, J. A.*; Edmiston, P. L. Preferential Extraction of Hydrocarbons from Fire Debris Samples by Solid Phase Microextraction. Journal of Forensic Sciences. 48, 130-134 (2003).
- Graham, A. L.*, Carlson, C. A.*, Edmiston. P. L. Development and Characterization of Molecularly Imprinted Sol-Gel Materials for the Selected Detection of DDT. Anal. Chem. 74, 458-467 (2002).
- Edmiston, P. L.. A New Start to Advanced Analytical Laboratory: Comparison of the Performance Characteristics of Various Instruments. J. Chem. Ed. 79(5), 616-618 (2002).
- Borders, C. L. Snider, M. J., Wolfenden, R., Edmiston, P. L. Determination of the Affinity of Each Component of a Composite Quaternary Transition-State Analogue Complex of Creatine Kinase. Biochemistry, 41, 6995–7000. (2002).
- Thompson, R. Q. and Edmiston, P. L. Ohio's Crime Solvers: Analytical Chemistry Students Making the Case for Homicide. Anal. Chem. 73, 678A-684A (2001).
- Edmiston, P. L., Schavolt, K. L.*, Kersteen, B. A.*, Moore, N. R.*, Borders C. L. Kinetic Analysis of R95 Mutants of Rabbit Muscle Creatine Kinase, Biochem. Biophys. Acta, 1546, 291-298 (2001).
- Edmiston, P. L. and Williams, T. R. An Analytical Experiment in Error Analysis: Repeated Determination of Glucose Using Commercial Glucometers. J. Chem. Educ.77, 377-379 (2000).
- Edmiston, P. L. and Saavedra, S. S. Molecular Orientation Distributions in Protein Films III. Yeast Cytochrome c Films Immobilized on Pyridine Disulfide Capped Phospholipid Bilayers. Biophys. J. 74, 999-1006 (1998).
- Edmiston, P. L. and Saavedra, S. S. Molecular Orientation Distribution in Protein Films IV. A Multilayer Composed of Yeast Cytochrome c Bound through an Intermediate Streptavidin Layer to a Planar Supported Phospholipid Bilayer. J. Am. Chem. Soc. 120, 1665-1671 (1998).
- Wood, L. L., Cheng, S. S., Edmiston, P. L. and Saavedra, S. S. Molecular Orientation Distributions in Protein Films II. Site Directed Immobilization of Yeast Cytochrome c on Thiol-Capped, Self-Assembled Monolayers.” J. Am. Chem. Soc. 119, 571-576 (1997).
- Edmiston, P. L., Lee, J. E., Cheng, S. S. and Saavedra, S. S. Molecular Orientation Distributions in Protein Films. I. Cytochrome c Adsorbed to Substrates of Variable Surface Chemistry. J. Am. Chem. Soc. 119, 560-570 (1997).
- Edmiston, P. L. and Saavedra, S. S. Fabrication and Characterization of Uranium Oxide Doped Sol-Gel Planar Waveguides for Attenuated Total Reflectance Spectrometry. Chem. Mater. 9, 2599-2603 (1997).
- Edmiston, P. L., Lee, J. E., Wood, L. L. and Saavedra, S. S. Dipole Orientation Distributions in Langmuir-Blodgett Films by Planar Waveguide Linear Dichroism and Fluorescence Anisotropy. J. Phys. Chem. 100, 775-784 (1997).
- Kölchens, S., Phiphivong, S., Edmiston, P. L. and Saavedra, S. S. Time-Resolved Total Internal Reflection Fluorescence Microscopy of Cultured Cells using a Tb-Chelate Label. Anal. Chim. Acta 307, 403-417 (1995).
- Edmiston, P. L., Wambolt, C., Smith, M. K. and Saavedra, S. S. Spectroscopic Characterization of Albumin and Myoglobin Entrapped in Bulk Sol-Gel Glasses. J. Colloid Interface Sci. 163, 395-406 (1994).
- Edmiston, P. L., Kolchens, S., Saavedra, S. S. Temporally Gating a Slow-Scan CCD with a Liquid Crystal Shutter. Appl. Spectroscopy 47, 250 (1993).

(* denotes College of Wooster undergraduate)
