= Lesley Lokko =

Ghanaian academic and writer (born 1964)

Lesley Lokko OBE
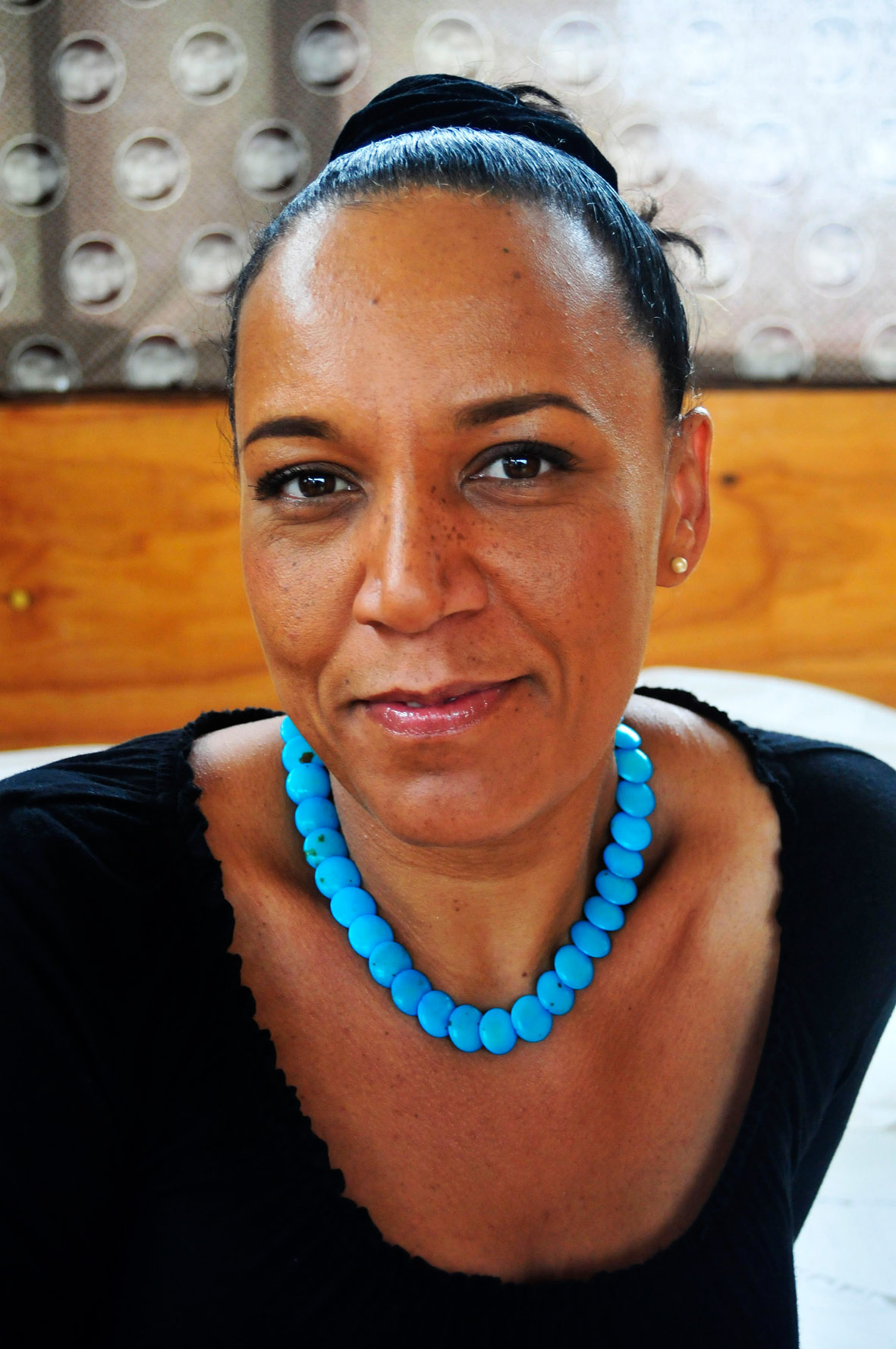
- Lokko in 2010
- Born: Lesley Naa Norle Lokko; 1964 (age 61–62); Dundee, Scotland
- Education: University College London, BSc(Arch)
- Occupations: Academic, architect, novelist
- Known for: Founder of African Futures Institute
- Awards: RIBA Annie Spink Award (2020); Ada Louise Huxtable Prize (2021); Royal Gold Medal (2024)
- Website: lesleylokko.com

Lesley Naa Norle Lokko (born 1964) is a Ghanaian-Scottish academic, architect and novelist. From 2019 to 2020, she was a professor and served as dean of the Bernard and Anne Spitzer School of Architecture at The City College of New York, in addition to holding teaching and other positions in Johannesburg, London, Accra and Edinburgh.

In 2015, Lokko established the Graduate School of Architecture (GSA) at University of Johannesburg – an African school dedicated to postgraduate architecture education. She returned to Accra, Ghana, in 2021 and established the African Futures Institute, a postgraduate school of architecture and public events platform.

In January 2024, Lokko was announced by the Royal Institute of British Architecture (RIBA) as recipient of the Royal Gold Medal, one of the world's highest honours for architecture. She was named on TIME magazine's list of the 100 Most Influential People of 2024.

== Early life and education ==
Lesley Lokko was born in 1964 in Dundee, the daughter of a Ghanaian surgeon and a Scottish Jewish mother, and grew up in Ghana and Scotland. Aged 17, she attended a private boarding school in England. She began studying Hebrew and Arabic at Oxford University, but left the programme to go to the United States. She graduated from the Bartlett School of Architecture, University College London, with a BSc(Arch) degree in 1992, and a MArch in 1995, and went on to earn a PhD in architecture from the University of London in 2007.

== Career ==
=== As writer and editor ===
Much of Lokko's writing contains themes about cultural and racial identity. She has frequently lectured in South Africa, and has also taught in the United Kingdom and the United States. She also writes regularly for The Architectural Review. She was editor of White Papers, Black Marks: Race, Culture, Architecture (University of Minnesota Press, 2000), and editor-in-chief of FOLIO: Journal of Contemporary African Architecture, as well as being on the editorial board of ARQ (Cambridge), and a series editor of Design Research in Architecture (UCL Press).

In 2004, Lokko published her first novel, Sundowners, a Guardian top 40 bestseller, following up with 11 further novels, including Saffron Skies (2005), Bitter Chocolate (2008), One Secret Summer (2010), A Private Affair (2011) and Little White Lies (2014). As characterised by The Scotsman in 2012, what Lokko writes "is 'glam lit' with women in high flying, exciting jobs who jet around the globe rubbing shoulders and other parts with devious men from the upper ranks of high society in twisting, intelligently spun tales." In 2020, she moved from Orion to PanMacmillan with her novel Soul Sisters.

She contributed an essay entitled "No more than three, please!" to the 2019 anthology New Daughters of Africa (edited by Margaret Busby).

=== Architecture ===
Lokko has taught architecture all over the globe. Before exiting the United States, She was an assistant professor in architecture at Iowa State University from 1997 to 1998 and at University of Illinois at Chicago from 1998 to 2000. In 2000, she became the Martin Luther King Visiting Professor of architecture at the University of Michigan. She then moved back to the United Kingdom for almost a decade, teaching architecture at Kingston University, University of North London and, finally, at the University of Westminster, where she established the current Master of Arts programme in the pathway of Architecture, Cultural Identity and Globalisation (MACIG).

Lokko was first appointed visiting African scholar at the University of Cape Town upon her return to South Africa. Tired of "Europe’s hand-me-downs", Lokko, in partnership with the University of Johannesburg, established the Graduate School of Architecture (GSA) in 2014/2015 and became its director. The GSA, modelled after the Graduate School of Design at Harvard University and London's Architectural Association, is the only school on the continent offering the Unit System way of teaching.

In 2015, Lokko became head of the newly established Graduate School and associate professor of architecture at the University of Johannesburg. She founded the GSA at a time of political imperatives in South Africa and witnessed the large-scale student protests, with the uprising conscious of national identity in postcolonial South Africa.

In June 2019, she was named as dean of the Bernard and Anne Spitzer School of Architecture at the City College of New York, remaining in this position until 2020.

Returning to Ghana, in 2021 she founded and is director of the African Futures Institute (AFI), a postgraduate school of architecture and public events platform in Accra.

In 2021, Lokko was appointed as the curator of the 18th Venice Biennale of Architecture, set to open in 2023. She became the first ever black curator of the Biennale. The exhibition was titled "The Laboratory of the Future", with the twin themes of decolonisation and decarbonisation providing a "a glimpse of future practices and ways of seeing and being in the world", and Lokko said: "It is impossible to build a better world if one cannot first imagine it." The RIBA Journal, acknowledging Lokko's intention to "rupture" the prevailing story of architecture that under-represented and excluded many people and places, observed that, with architects and artists from Africa and the African diaspora for the first time comprising the majority of the contributors to the Biennale, and a gender balance of 50–50, "The result is a bold, complex exhibition that seems urgent and deeply felt. It is uncomfortable and uplifting, forcing us to confront violence and environmental destruction in which architecture is complicit."

== Honours, awards and recognition ==
In 2020, Lokko was awarded the RIBA Annie Spink Award for Excellence in Architectural Education. This was followed in 2021 with the Ada Louise Huxtable Prize for Contribution to Architecture.

In 2023, Lokko was appointed Officer of the Order of the British Empire (OBE) in the New Year Honours for services to architecture and education.

In January 2024, Lokko was announced by the Royal Institute of British Architects (RIBA) as the recipient of the Royal Gold Medal, one of the world's highest honours for architecture, given in recognition of a lifetime's work to people who have had a significant influence either directly or indirectly on the advancement of architecture. As noted by Oliver Wainwright in The Guardian, she is the first African woman and only the second black architect to be chosen for the award since it was first presented in 1848.

Describing her as "[a] fierce champion of equity and inclusion in all aspects of life", RIBA president Muyiwa Oki stated: "Lesley Lokko's progressive approach to architecture education offers hope for the future – a profession that welcomes those from all walks of life, considers the needs of our environment, and acknowledges a broad range of cultures and perspectives. A visionary agent of change, Lesley has dedicated her life to championing these values, not only through academic endeavors, but through her work as an author and curator. She remains a humble revolutionary force, with her ambition and optimism etching an indelible mark on the global architectural stage."

In 2024, Lokko featured on the Time 100 list of the top 100 most influential people in the world.

In December 2024, Lesley Lokko was included on the BBC's 100 Women list.

== Selected published works ==
- 2000: White Papers, Black Marks: Race, Culture, Architecture
- 2004: Sundowners
- 2005: Saffron Skies
- 2008: Bitter Chocolate
- 2009: Rich Girl, Poor Girl
- 2010: One Secret Summer
- 2011: A Private Affair
- 2012: An Absolute Deception
- 2014: Little White Lies
- 2016: The Last Debutante
- 2021: Soul Sisters

=== As editor ===
- 2000: White Papers, Black Marks: Architecture, Race, Culture
- 2017: FOLIO: Journal of Contemporary African Architecture Vol. 1
- 2020: FOLIO: Journal of Contemporary African Architecture Vol. 2
