= M. J. Molloy =

Irish playwright (1914–1994)

Michael Joseph Molloy (3 March 1914 – 1994) was an Irish playwright. He was born and died in Milltown, County Galway.

== Early life ==
Molloy originally intended to become a priest, but contracted tuberculosis as a young man. He began writing during his long hospital stays in the 1930s.

== Career ==
His first play, Old Road, was produced at the Abbey Theatre in 1943. His plays were popular in the 1940s, 1950s, and 1960s, and generally presented by the Abbey Theatre, but only one of his later plays, Petticoat Loose (1979) was staged at the Abbey.

He has been viewed as a natural successor to Synge, by such as Professor Robert O'Driscoll, and Molloy himself saying in the Irish Times in Sept 1955 - "Does Synge influence me?. Not directly, but the people who gave him his material do. My neighbourhood at home is full of Synge characters".

His second play The Visiting House was produced at the Abbey in late 1946. It was inspired to an extent by his own visits to the house of local Milltown blacksmith Michael Silke, where stories were told and tales re-enacted. This was in a time when electricity supply had not reached the locality and, with his interest in folklore, throughout the 1940s and into the 1950s MJ travelled (by bicycle) within a ten-mile radius of Milltown recording stories and folklore from many rural households.

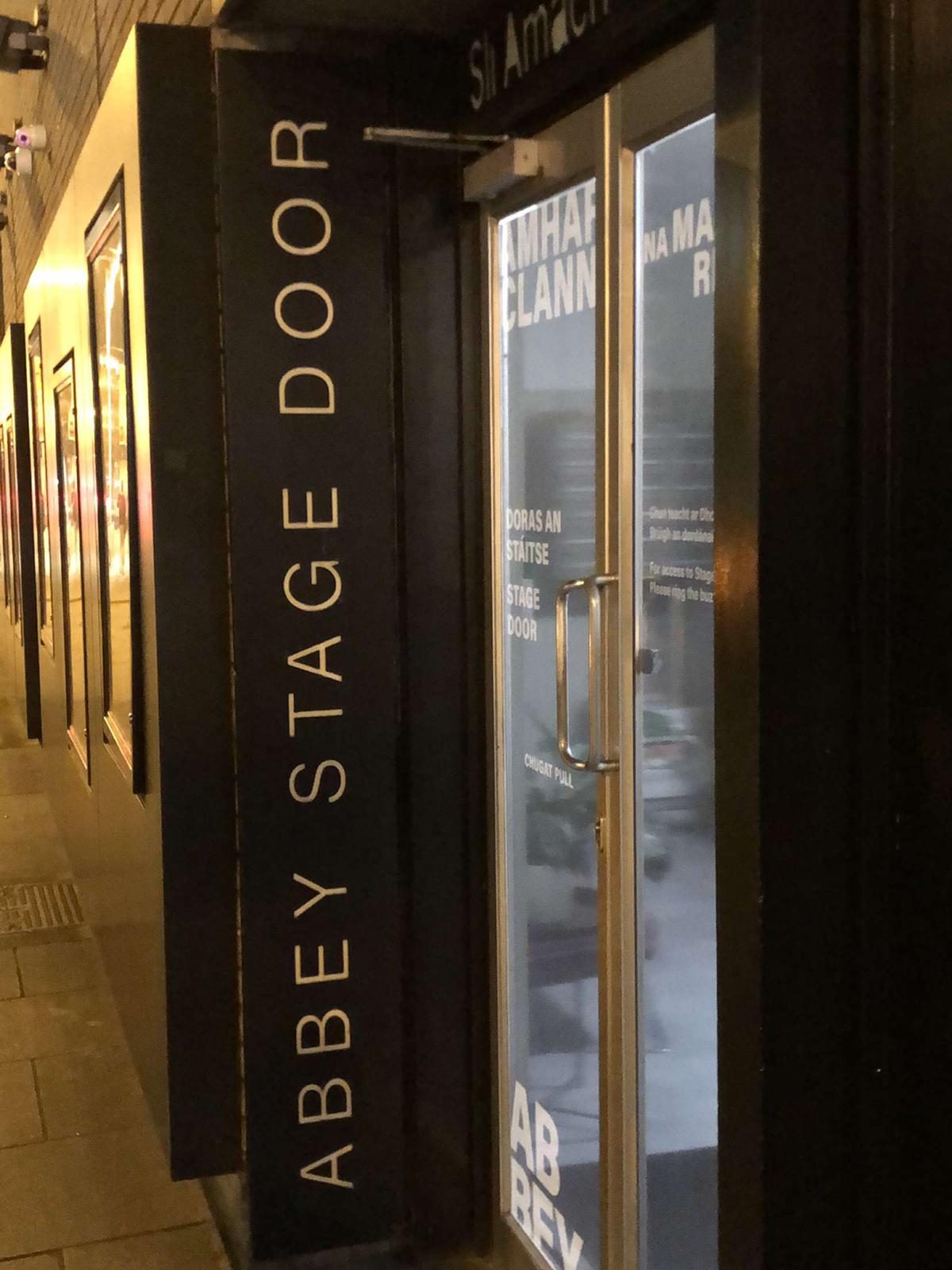
Abbey Theatre or the Abbey in Dublin, Ireland. Many of Molloy's plays were produced in this theatre.

The following are Molloy plays that were produced at the Abbey Theatre:

- Old Road (1943)
- The Visiting House (1946)
- The King of Friday's Men (1948)
- The Wood of the Whispering (1/26/1953)
- The Paddy Pedlar (9/5/1953)
- The Will and the Way (1955)
- The Wooing of Duvesna (1964)
- Petticoat Loose (1979)

Old Road by M.J.Molloy; is set in rural Galway in the spring and summer of 1939. The spectre of the Second World War looms large over a group of young people who are desperate to escape to a better life in England. Land ownership, poverty, lack of opportunity and old-fashioned marriage customs threaten to drive the younger generation away from their native Connaught. The action takes place in the household of the choleric, cantankerous and tyrannical old farmer Lordeen; who, desperate for a wife, engages the services of the mercenary matchmaker William Duffy. In the meanwhile, love blossoms between the Lord's servants, the cool and happy-go-lucky Myles Cosgrave and the damsel-in-distress Bridgeen McDonagh who do their best to deny their passion for each other. Bodhagh Merrigan, a conniving land-grabber manipulates the Lordeen's situation to lay hold of his 70-acre (280,000 m^{2}) farm, whilst Merrigan's own son Paak must go to England, denied the chance of a small holding and marriage to his first love Mary. Lordeen's other labourer, the cobbler and self-styled intellectual Luke Sweeney, is the target for the affections of the caustic, ‘black’ widow, Mrs Callaghan. Merrigan and Mrs Callaghan collude to ensure that Lordeen finds out that Myles has been trading agricultural goods to make up the shortfall in his pay. Lordeen, in a fit of Rage, calls for the Sergeant who decides not to press charges, torn between his duty to the law and what he feels to be his own Christian moral code. Myles proposes to Brigid who readily accepts and in the hope of staying in Ireland asks Merrigan to allow them to rent a small holding on his land. Believing that this is part of a scheme to dupe the Sergeant, Merrigan agrees. When the Sergeant leaves, Merrigan denies Myles the opportunity to rent and tells him to let Brigid go to England by herself. Merrigan pursues Patrick Walsh to sell him his farm, but the Lordeen clutching to the hope of finding a wife refuses to sell and is set to drink himself into oblivion. The others arrive and dissuade Brigid from marrying Myles and they leave set for an uncertain future in England.)

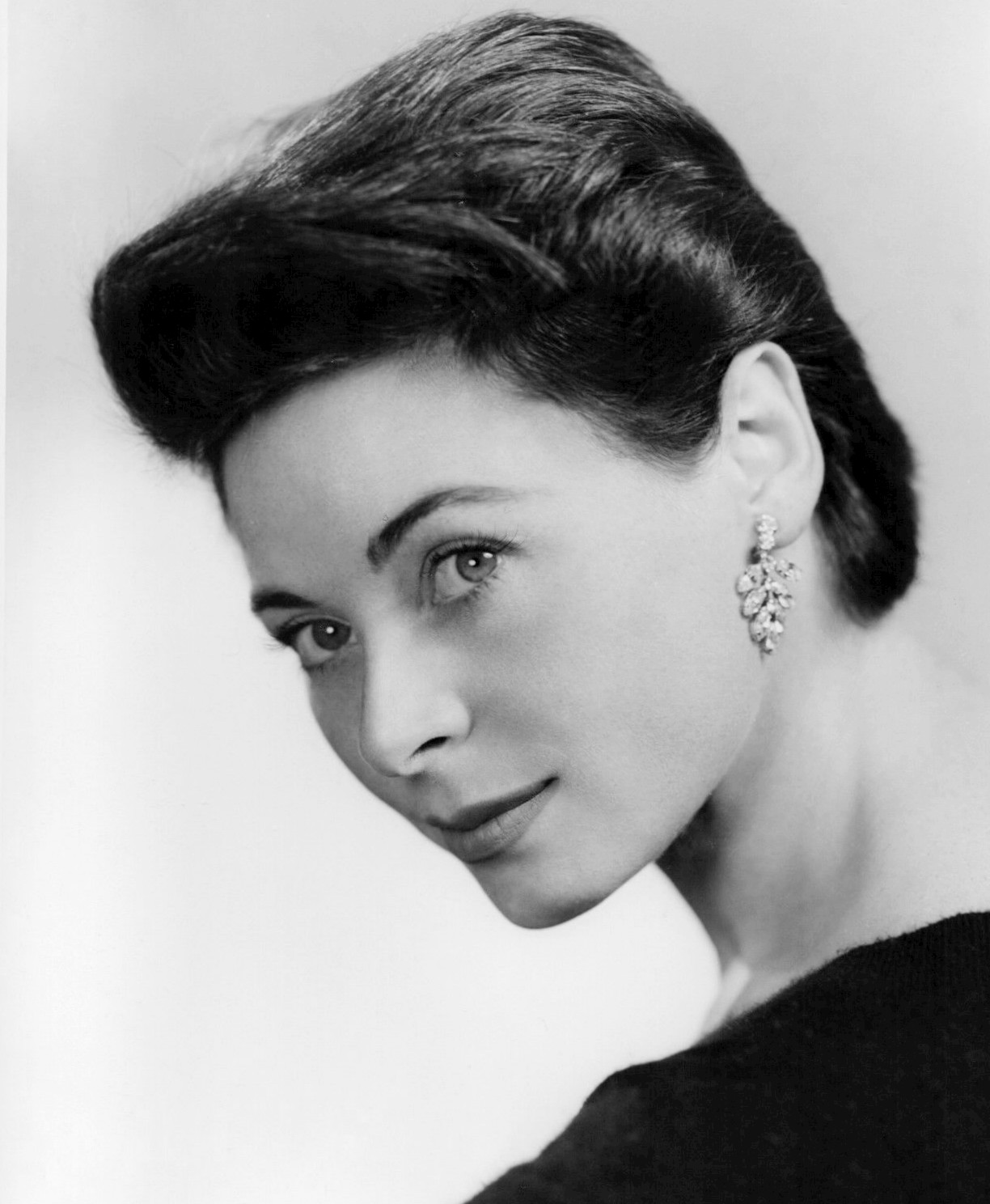
Siobhan McKenna was in Molloy's play Daughter from over the Water (1963). Image from a 1959 photograph.

His most famous and successful plays were:

- The King of Friday's Men(1948) - which was produced in both London and New York, as well as being regularly revived by the Abbey Theatre in later decades.
- The Paddy Pedlar (1952) - which had its first staging when produced by his brother Gerry with Ballina Dramatic Society in 1952, and won the All-Ireland Amateur Drama Festival Award. It was staged by the Abbey and also broadcast on BBC and RTE.
- The Wood of the Whispering (1953) - Revived by the Abbey in the 1960s, also staged at Stratford in 1963, and in the 1980s by Druid Theatre/Gary Hynes at Dublin Theatre Festival.
- Daughter from over the Water (1963) had a successful run at the Gaiety Theatre in Dublin in 1964, starring Siobhan McKenna.

== Biographical coverage ==
His brother Christy Molloy wrote a biographical sketch about M.J. Molloy in pages 250-253 of the book Milltown Sketches.

== Works ==
=== Plays ===
- Old Road (1943)
- The Visiting House (1946)
- The King of Friday's Men (1948)
- The Wood of the Whispering (1953)
- The Paddy Pedlar (1952)
- The Will And The Way (1955)
- Daughter from Over the Water (1963)
- A Right Rose Tree (1958)
- The Wooing of Duvessa (1964)
- The Bride of Fontebranda (1975)
- Petticoat Loose (1979)
- The Bachelor's Daughter (1985)
- The Bride of Fontebranda (19??) - unperformed
- Delilah (1982) - unperformed
- The Runaways (1987)
- The Fateful Princess (1993) - unperformed

=== Prose ===
- "The Visiting House" - a collection of folklore
