= John Burrell (theatre director) =

John Percy Burrell (6 May 1910–28 September 1972) was an English theatre director.

John Burrell was educated at Shrewsbury School in Shropshire, England and he led a successful theatre career afterwards. He was appointed as a co-director of the Old Vic Theatre in London, England, with Laurence Olivier and Ralph Richardson in 1948.

He later moved to the US and worked on Broadway, New York.

"He was a founder of the American Shakespeare Festival Theatre and Academy at Stratford, Connecticut, where he also taught acting, and which opened its first season in July 1955. He was then executive artistic director for CBS TV in New York, and was credited with revolutionizing design on television. Burrell's final post was as a drama professor at the University of Illinois." He served as the first director of Krannert Center for the Performing Arts, which a critic for The New York Times called “one of the most ingeniously worked out art complexes anywhere,” until his death in 1972.
