= Jeremy Edmiston =

Australian American architect

Jeremy Edmiston (1964) is an Australian American architect, founder and principal of System Architects and former director of the Masters of Architecture program at the Anne and Bernard Spitzer School of Architecture at City College, New York. He is considered a pioneer in digital prefabricated design and construction.

== Life and works ==
Edmiston was born in Brisbane, Australia, to an architect father and homemaker mother. He graduated with the University Medal at the University of Technology, Sydney, while working for Harry Seidler and Associates, in 1989 and in 1992, got his Master's degree from Columbia University’s Graduate School of Architecture, Planning and Preservation (GSAPP), as a Fulbright scholar and Harkness Fellow. He founded System Architects in 1996 as a research-driven practice, applying new digital technologies to create complex geometries, expand both design and fabrication techniques and to adapt natural processes and forms to create more environmentally sensitive building types. Arts writer Carolina Miranda has described his technique as creating "geometric shapes I can't even describe."

In conjunction with his then partner Douglas Gauthier, he designed the Wilkinson-award winning Burst House in North Haven, in New South Wales, Australia. The house was selected for inclusion in the Museum of Modern Art’s 2008 Home Delivery exhibition, and a full-size replica was constructed in the museum’s parking lot. Architectural theorist Richard Garber claimed the house demonstrated that "information models can be employed to optimize, simulate and make construction methods more efficient."

In 2010, System Architects was involved in a public controversy over the digitally-generated facade of a townhouse Edmiston designed in the historic New York City district of Tribeca. Despite initial opposition to the building, the design drew unanimous approval from the New York City Landmarks Preservation Committee. Architecture critics subsequently described the home as spearheading "a new urban language" for the city. In 2017, it won an award for "innovative architecture in a landmark district" from the New York Chapter of the Society of American Registered Architects and in 2019, it won the World Architecture News Gold award specifically for its facade.

Edmiston began teaching at City College in 1999. He has also taught at Pratt Institute, Syracuse University, Parsons School of Design and Columbia University and has lectured at Yale, Columbia and Princeton, as well as the Bauhaus in Weimar, Germany. He has contributed essays to Sites and Stations: Provisional Utopias, Techno-Fiction: Zur Kritik der Technologischen Utopien, and Yale Constructs. He is the brother of Sydney fashion designer Leona Edmiston.

== Awards and honors ==
System’s work has won the AIA Wilkinson Award (2006), a AIA New Housing New York Competition citation, an Australian Timber Design Award, a Bank of America Design Award, a World Design Award Gold Medal, a Global Future Design Award, the McGraw Hill Best Construction Award, an ArchitzerA+ Award for Architecture + Materials, a Think Brick award, an Architecture Master Prize, the Architectural League Prize, and an award from SARA NY.

Edmiston’s work has been widely published in such outlets as TIME, the Wall Street Journal, The New York Times, the Financial Times, Domus, Metropolis, The Sydney Morning Herald, ABC Australia, the New York Sun, New York Magazine and Architecture Australia. As well as being cited in numerous books, the firm’s work was the subject of a monograph, Surfaced, published by Oscar Riera Ojeda Publishers in 2015.
