= Dwell (magazine) =

U.S. residential architecture and design magazine

- Editor: William Hanley
- CEO: Zach Klein
- Categories: Architecture and Design
- Frequency: Bi-Monthly
- Publisher: Recurrent
- Total circulation: 250,000 (2017)
- Founder: Lara Hedberg Deam
- First issue: October 2000
- Company: Ziff Davis
- Country: USA
- Based in: San Francisco, California and New York, New York
- Language: English
- Website: www.dwell.com
- ISSN: 1530-5309

Dwell is a design and technology brand. It was launched with a magazine in October 2000 by CEO Lara Hedberg Deam with architecture and design critic Karrie Jacobs as its editor-in-chief. In August 2002, Jacobs left the magazine and was replaced by senior editor Allison Arieff. After Arieff, Sam Grawe held the position from 2006 to 2011, followed by Amanda Dameron from 2011 to 2017. William Hanley became the editor-in-chief in 2019. In January 2020, it was announced that Zach Klein would be taking over as Dwell's CEO.

In summer 2016, Dwell relaunched as a community publishing platform. In late 2016, the brand announced Modern by Dwell Magazine, a collection of over 200 products for Target. Designed by Dwell co-creative directors of product design Chris Deam and Nick Dine, the collection includes both furniture and decor pieces and will launch on December 27, 2016.

In 2022, Dwell was acquired by Recurrent.

In 2026, Dwell was acquired by Ziff Davis.

== Recognition ==
- April 2005 National Magazine Award for General Excellence in the 100,000-to-250,000 circulation category.
- March 2006 Adweek 2006 Creative Team of the Year award to creative director Claudia Bruno and photo editor Kate Stone.

== In popular culture ==
The Tumblr blog “Unhappy Hipsters,” which launched in 2010, pairs photos from Dwell with humorous captions that mock the ascetic lifestyle suggested by some of the photos. The blog achieved significant popularity at the time, and its creators wrote a spinoff book in 2011, It's Lonely in the Modern World.

The magazine is featured in The Simpsons episode "The Day The Earth Stood Cool" (2012).

== Dwell Home Design Invitational ==
In January 2003, Dwell invited 16 architects to participate in the Dwell Home Design Invitational, an international competition to design a modern prefab home for $200,000. The competition was conceived by Allison Arieff, after she published Prefab, a book on prefab homes in 2002. After reading Arieff's book, Nathan Wieler (an entrepreneur in North Carolina) contacted Arieff to inquire about how he and his fiancée Ingrid Tung could purchase a modern prefab home. Arieff's conversation with Wieler about a lack of affordable modern houses available inspired her to launch the competition.

The site for the Dwell Home was a 12-acre plot of land that Wieler and Tung owned in Pittsboro, North Carolina, near Chapel Hill, North Carolina.

The participating architects were:

- Anderson Anderson in Washington and California
- Anshen + Allen in California
- Michael Bell in New York
- Central Office of Architecture in California
- Claesson Koivisto Rune in Sweden
- Collins + Turner Architects in Australia
- Jones Partners: Architecture in California
- Adam Kalkin in New Jersey
- Konyk Architecture in New York
- Marmol + Radziner in California
- William Massie and NY; Resolution: 4 Architecture in New York
- Ralph Rapson & Toby Rapson in Minnesota
- Rocio Romero in Missouri
- Jennifer Siegal in California
- su11 architecture+design in New York

In May 2003, the architects submitted their proposals. Then, Wieler and Tung came to Dwell's office in San Francisco to meet with Arieff and a panel of advisors to select the winning design. Judging was based on aesthetics, adherence to the budget of $200,000, construction viability, and potential for mass production. Soon after at the International Contemporary Furniture Fair (ICFF) in New York City, Dwell announced that Resolution: 4 Architecture (RES4) won the competition.

Resolution: 4 Architecture's proposal, entitled "Modern Modular," used prefabricated modules that were affordably built in a factory, shipped to the site, and craned onto a concrete foundation, which housed the mechanical systems. RES4's concept was that prefabricated modules could be configured in countless ways for unlimited design possibilities, though their proposal also included a home designed specifically to the clients, Wieler and Tung, and to the site.

Architecturally, the 2,260-square-foot Dwell Home, composed of seven modules, reads as two intersecting bars, with the open-plan communal areas in the lower level bar and the private spaces in the second story. RES4's design used many windows and sliding glass doors for daylighting and views, and a roof deck includes an outdoor fireplace. Materials such as cedar siding, bamboo flooring, and aluminum-clad windows demonstrated the potential for customization with prefabricated construction.

Carolina Building Solutions (CBS) was the factory selected to build the Dwell Home. Resolution: 4 Architecture's plan for the Dwell Home was designed within the limitations of the highway department regulations for shipping, but CBS still spent several months on engineering the Dwell Home, working within CBS's manufacturing procedures without changing RES4's original design. CBS began constructing the modules on April 6, 2004, and finished on April 13, 2004. It took only five days to build the framing and install insulation, sheathing, rough plumbing, rough electrical, nearly all of the Sheetrock, windows and trim, weatherproofing, cabinetry and stairs. On April 21, 2004, the modules were shipped from the CBS factory in Salisbury, North Carolina, to the site. By April 23, 2004, all the modules were set on the foundation. On July 10, 2004, the Dwell Home Open House expected to receive about 500 visitors, but received nearly 2,500 visitors, coming from as far as Michigan, California, and Oregon. Initial construction cost estimates for the Dwell Home were about $87 per square foot, but the final cost in 2004 came in at about $110. The cost for the modules was $100,289.

== See also ==
- List of architecture magazines
