= Boucicault (surname) =

Boucicault is a surname.

Notable people with the name include

- Dion Boucicault (1820–1890), Irish actor and playwright, and his children:
  - Aubrey Boucicault (1868–1913), British actor
  - Dion Boucicault Jr. (1859–1929), Irish actor and stage director
  - Nina Boucicault (1867–1950), English actress

== See also ==
- Boucicaut (disambiguation)
