= Agnes Robertson =

Agnes Robertson may refer to

- Agnes Kelly Robertson (1833–1916), American actress
- Agnes Robertson (politician) (1882–1968), Australian politician
- Agnes Jane Robertson (1893–1959), British historian
