= Victory Bateman =

American silent film actress

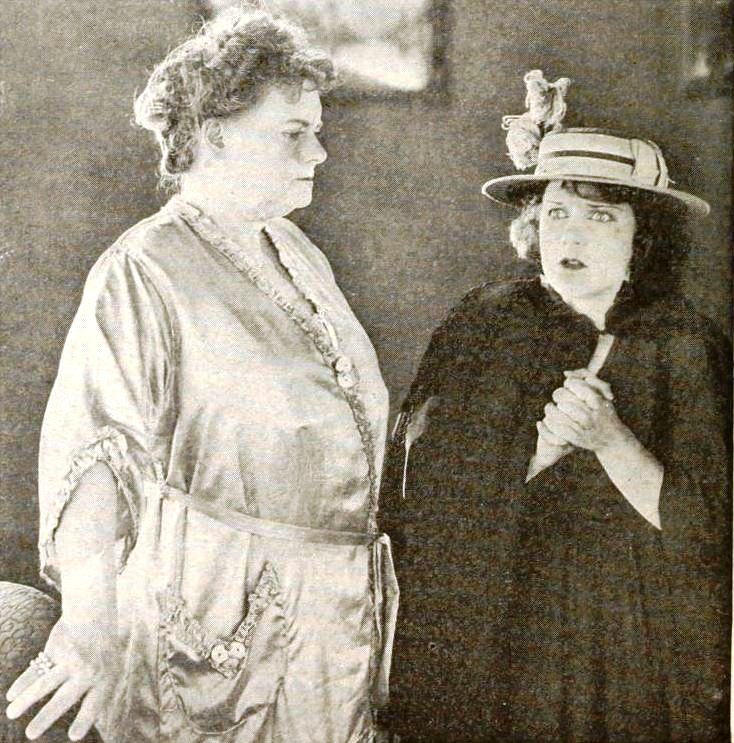
- Bateman (left) in Cinderella's Twin (1920)
- Born: Victory Creese; April 6, 1865; Philadelphia, Pennsylvania, U.S.
- Died: March 2, 1926 (aged 60); Los Angeles, California, U.S.
- Occupation: Film actress
- Spouses: Wilfred Clarke (before 1926) Harry Mestayer (m. 1900–1905) George Cleveland (m. 1910)

Victory Bateman (April 6, 1865 in Philadelphia – March 2, 1926 in Los Angeles) was an American silent film actress. Her father, Thomas Creese, and her mother, Elizabeth "Lizzie" Creese, were both actors. On stage, she appeared in the 1900 tour of "The Man From Mexico" and in the 1919 tour of "Seven Days' Leave".

Bateman was born nine days before Abraham Lincoln was assassinated, but was named Victory because of the North's eventual win over the Confederate South finishing the Civil War. In the early 1890s, she became embroiled in the divorce proceedings of actors Aubrey Boucicault and Amy Busby. Though later exonerated from all involvement in the case, Bateman was forced to resign from an all-woman's group called the Professional Woman's League. At one time, she was married to Wilfred Clarke, a son of John Sleeper Clarke and Asia Booth, and nephew of Edwin and John Wilkes Booth. They were separated for many years at the time of the Boucicault trial. She was also married, in later years, to Harry Mestayer and to George Cleveland. She and her last two husbands were eventually involved in the silent film industry.

Bateman bore a resemblance to Marie Dressler and to the later Frances Bavier, Aunt Bee on The Andy Griffith Show.

== Filmography ==
- Nicholas Nickleby (1912) as Miss La Creevy
- Her Cousin Fred (1912) as Victory, Fred's Sister
- Tangled Relations (1912) as The Widow, Florence's Mother
- Her Nephews from Labrador (1913) as The Aunt
- The Dove in the Eagle's Nest (1913)
- For Her Boy's Sake (1913)
- The Lady Killer (1913)
- Article 47, L' (1913)
- The House in the Tree (1913)
- The Hendrick's Divorce (1913)
- The Ten of Spades (1914)
- The Ring (1914)
- The Thief and the Book (1914)
- The Stronger Hand (1914)
- Freckles (1914)

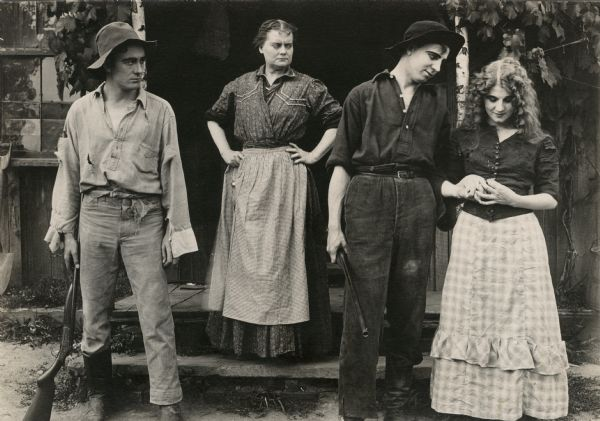
Bateman (on step) in the 1912 film After All

- The Power of Evil (1916)
- Romeo and Juliet (1916) as Lady Montague
- The Passing of the Third Floor Back (1918) as Miss De Hooley
- The Service Star (1918) as Aunt Judith
- Cinderella's Twin (1920) as Ma Du Geen
- Beautifully Trimmed (1920) as Mrs. Calkins
- Keeping Up with Lizzie (1921) as Mrs. Henshaw
- A Trip to Paradise (1921) as Mrs. Smiley
- The Idle Rich (1921) as Mrs. O'Reilly
- A Girl's Desire (1922) as Mrs. Browne
- If I Were Queen (1922) as Aunt Ollie
- Captain Fly-by-Night (1922) as Señora
- Can a Woman Love Twice? (1923) as Mary's Landlady
- Human Wreckage (1923) as Mother Finnegan
- The Eternal Three (1923) as Mrs. Tucker
- Tess of the D'Urbervilles (1924) as Joan Durbeyfield
- The Turmoil (1924) as Mrs. James Sheridan
