= Erskine Sanford =

American actor (1885–1969)

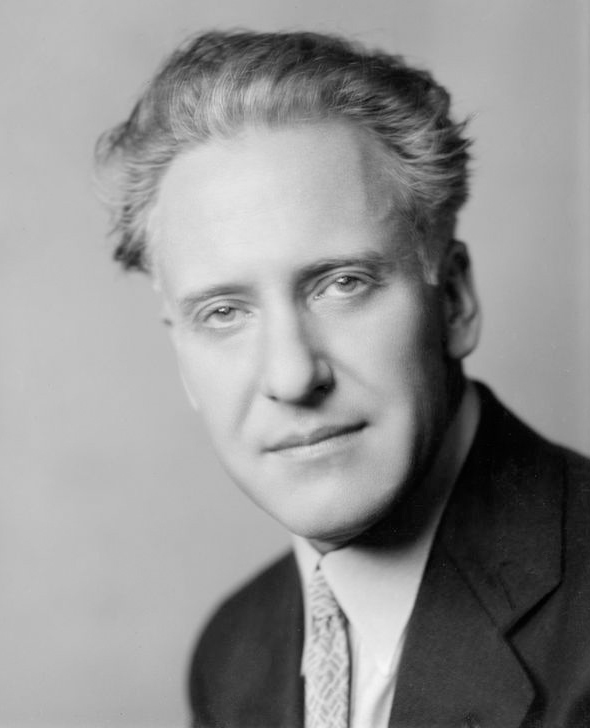
- Erskine Sanford in Porgy (1928–1930)
- Born: November 19, 1885; Trinidad, Colorado, U.S.
- Died: July 7, 1969 (aged 83); Los Angeles, California, U.S.
- Occupation: Actor
- Years active: 1904–1952
- Spouse(s): Fanny Reynolds Howe (m. 1918; 19??)
- Children: 2

Erskine Sanford (November 19, 1885 – July 7, 1969) was an American actor on the stage, radio and motion pictures. Long associated with the Theatre Guild, he later joined Orson Welles's Mercury Theatre company and appeared in several of Welles's films, including Citizen Kane (1941), in which he played Herbert Carter, the bumbling, perspiring newspaper editor.

== Biography ==
Erskine Sanford was born in Trinidad, Colorado, and was educated at the Horace Mann School in New York City. Beginning his acting career with Minnie Maddern Fiske's company, he made his professional debut in Leah Kleschna. He appeared in The Blue Bird and The Piper (1910–11) at the New Theatre in New York City, and in Shakespearean repertory with Ben Greet.

For some 15 years, he was associated with the Theatre Guild, playing roles on Broadway and on tour, including performances of Porgy and Strange Interlude on the London stage.

In Kenosha, Wisconsin, Sanford first met Orson Welles in 1922, when the seven-year-old boy came backstage to meet him after a touring performance of Mr. Pim Passes By. Years later, Sanford left the Theatre Guild to join Welles's Mercury Theatre company, and made his Mercury debut in the 1938 stage production of Heartbreak House. Appearing as Mazzini Dunn, Sanford reprised the role he had created 18 years before in the Theatre Guild's world premiere production.

In 1941, Sanford married psychiatric nursing pioneer Adele Poston, but the marriage lasted only a short time.

Sanford died in 1969.

== Theatre credits ==
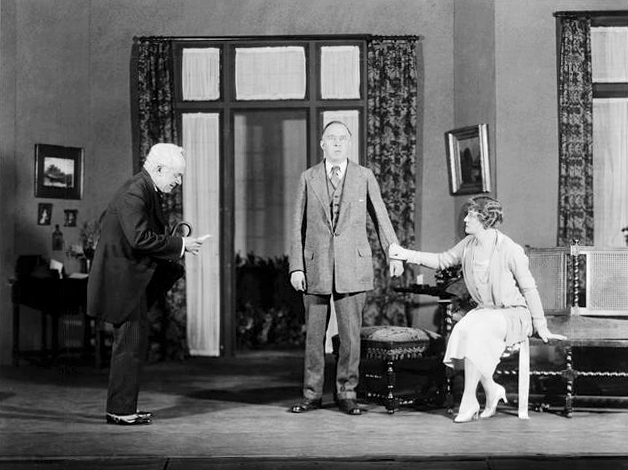
Erskine Sanford, Dudley Digges and Laura Hope Crews in the Theatre Guild production of A.A. Milne's Mr. Pim Passes By (1921)

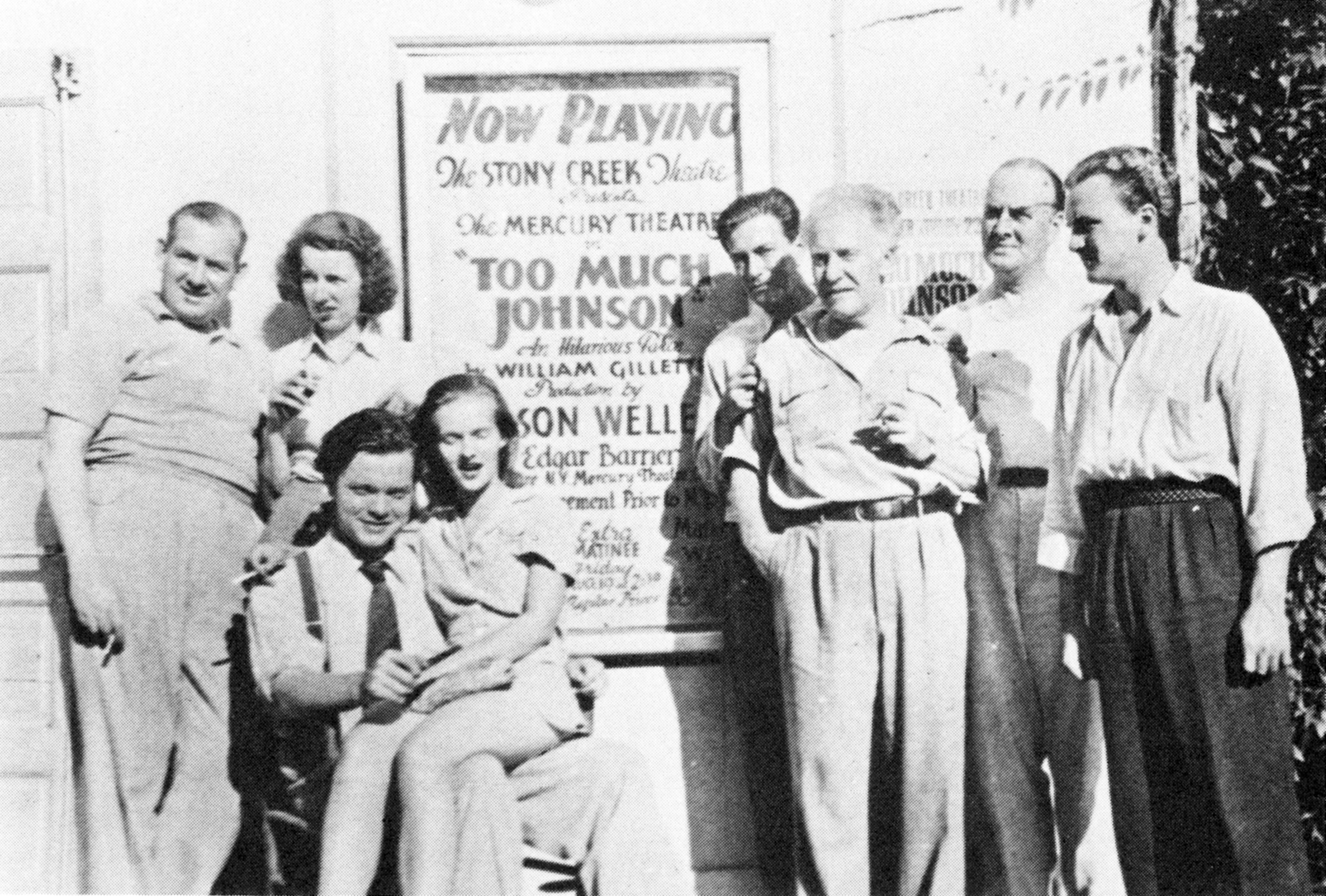
Howard Smith, Mary Wickes, Orson Welles, Virginia Nicolson, William Herz, Erskine Sanford, Eustace Wyatt and Joseph Cotten during the two-week run of the Mercury Theatre stage production of Too Much Johnson (1938)

Date	Title	Role	Notes
February 11, 1916	Playlets		Belasco Theatre, New York City
November 14 – December 30, 1916	Gertrude Kingston and a Visiting Company		Neighborhood Playhouse and Maxine Elliott Theatre, New York City
October 13, 1919 – January 1920	The Faithful	Hara, Honzo	Garrick Theatre, New York City; Theatre Guild production
November 25, 1919 – February 1920	The Rise of Silas Lapham	Mr. Sewell	Garrick Theatre, New York City
January 15 – March 1920	The Power of Darkness	Mitrich	Garrick Theatre, New York City
February 23 – September 1920	Jane Clegg	Mr. Morrison	Garrick Theatre, New York City
September 4 – October 1920	The Treasure	The President of the Community	Garrick Theatre, New York City
November 10, 1920 – February 26, 1921	Heartbreak House	Mazzini Dunn	Garrick Theatre, New York City
February 28 – June 1921	Mr. Pim Passes By	Carraway Pim	Garrick Theatre, New York City
April 20 – June 1921	Liliom	Captain, First Policeman of the Beyond	Garrick Theatre, New York City
December 20, 1922 – February 1923	Johannes Kreisler	Theodor	Apollo Theatre, New York City
March 26 – April 1923	Sandro Botticelli	Fra Filippo Lippi	Provincetown Playhouse, New York City
November 19, 1923 – January 1924	The Failures	The Musician	Garrick Theatre, New York City
April 14 – June 1924	Man and the Masses	Third Banker, A Priest	Garrick Theatre, New York City
October 19 – December 1925	The Glass Slipper	Captain Gal, Police Sergeant	Guild Theatre, New York City
January 25 – March 1926	The Goat Song	Starsina, Priest	Guild Theatre, New York City
March 23 – April 1926	What's the Big Idea	Peter Clausen	Bijou Theatre, New York City
October 11 – November 1926	Juarez and Maximilian	Lawyer Siliceo, Jose Rincon Gallardo	Guild Theatre, New York City
November 18 – December 1926	The Witch	Master Laurentius	Greenwich Village Theatre, New York City
February 24 – March 1927	Puppets of Passion	Attendant	Theatre Masque, New York City
April 18 – August 1927	Mr. Pim Passes By	Carraway Pim	Garrick Theatre, New York City
1928 – August 1928	Porgy	Alan Archdale	Republic Theatre, New York City
1928–29	Porgy	Alan Archdale	Tour including nine weeks in Chicago, six weeks in London, and performances in Boston, Philadelphia, Cincinnati, Washington, Cleveland, Pittsburgh, Baltimore, Detroit, San Francisco, Los Angeles, and cities in the northwestern United States and Canada
September 13 – October 1929	Porgy	Alan Archdale	Martin Beck Theatre, New York City
October 14, 1929 – January 1930	Porgy	Alan Archdale	National tour
October 27 – December 1930	Roar China	Mr. Tourist	Martin Beck Theatre, New York City
October 26, 1931 – March 1932	Mourning Becomes Electra	Dr. Joseph Blake, Abner Small	Guild Theatre, New York City
February 21 – March 1933	American Dream	Murdoch	Guild Theatre, New York City
February 21 – April 1934	They Shall Not Die	Sheriff Nelson	Royale Theatre, New York City
December 10, 1934 – January 1935	Valley Forge	Mr. Folsom	Guild Theatre, New York City
October 11 – October 1935	Sweet Mystery of Life	Doctor Warren	Shubert Theatre, New York City
April 29 – June 11, 1938	Heartbreak House	Mazzini Dunn	Mercury Theatre, New York City
August 16–29, 1938	Too Much Johnson	Frederic	Stony Creek Theatre, Stony Creek, Connecticut
February 27 – March 1939	Five Kings (Part One)	Lord Chief Justice	Colonial Theatre, Boston
March 13 – March 1939	Five Kings (Part One)	Lord Chief Justice	National Theatre, Washington, D.C.
March 20–25, 1939	Five Kings (Part One)	Lord Chief Justice	Chestnut Street Opera House, Philadelphia
March 24 – June 28, 1941	Native Son	Mr. Dalton	St. James Theatre, New York City
May 28–31, 1947	Macbeth	Duncan	Kingsbury Hall, University of Utah, Salt Lake City; Six performances staged in preparation for the film version shot in June 1947 with the same principal cast

== Filmography ==
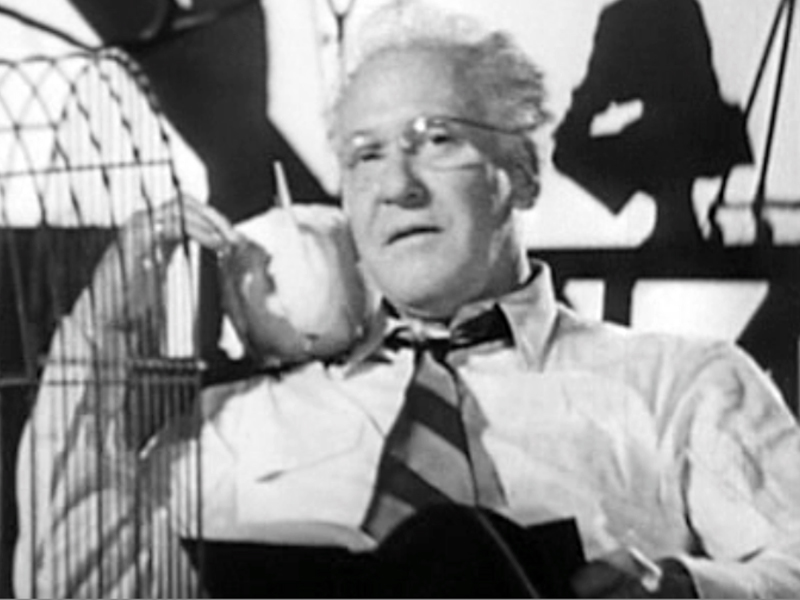
Erskine Sanford in the Citizen Kane trailer (1940)

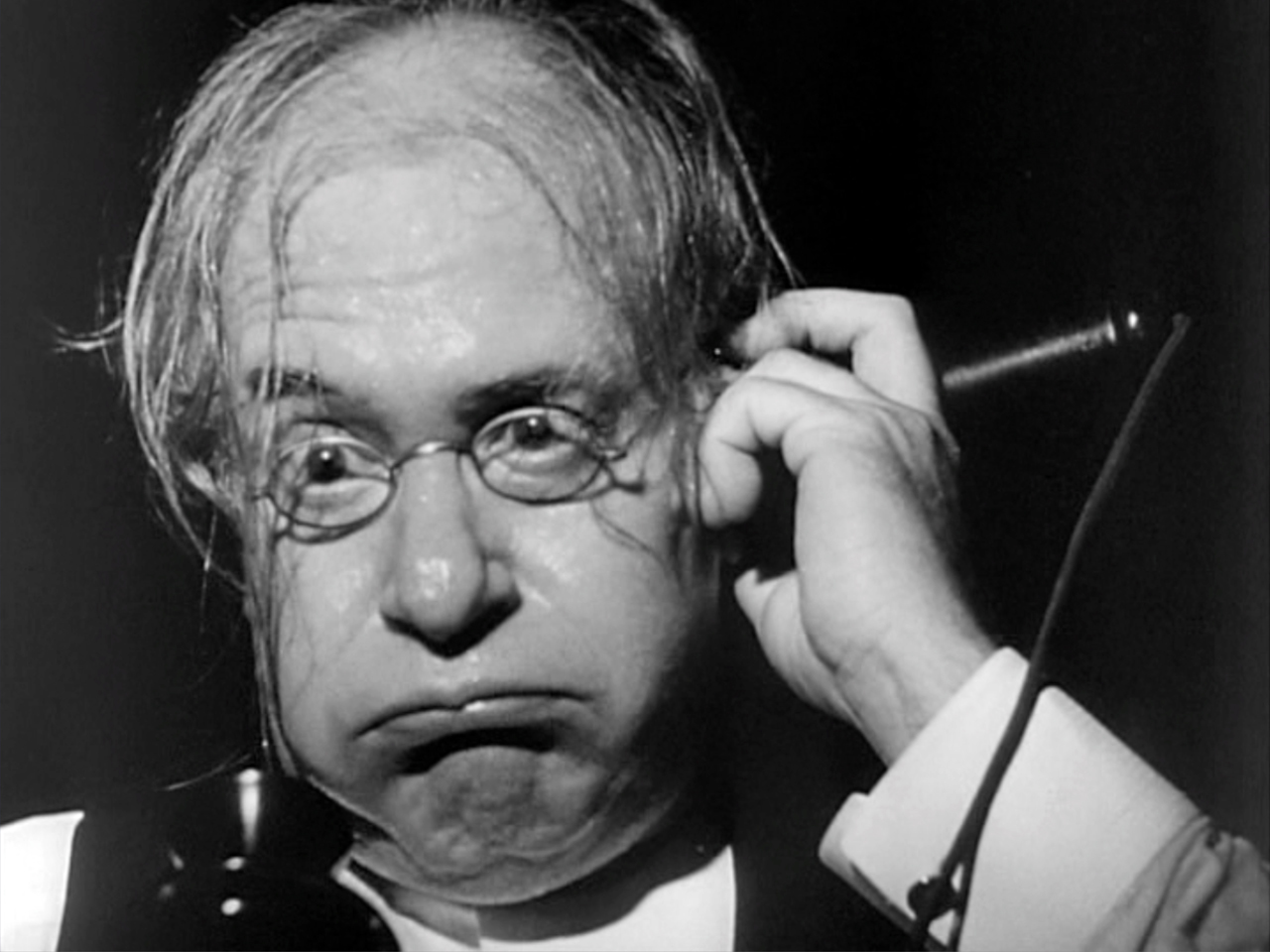
Erskine Sanford as Herbert Carter in the Citizen Kane trailer (1940)

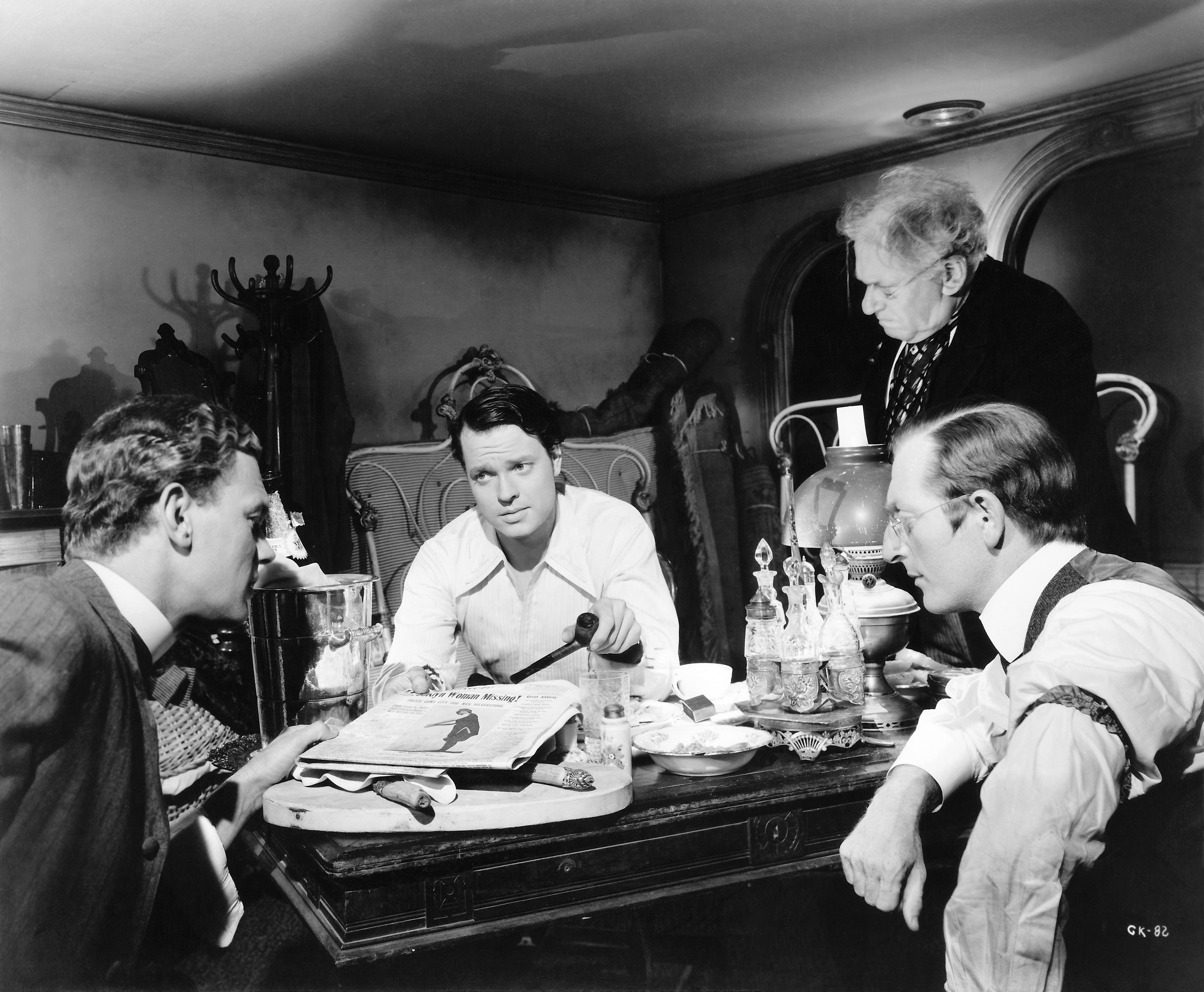
Joseph Cotten, Orson Welles, Everett Sloane and Erskine Sanford in Citizen Kane (1941)

Year	Title	Role	Notes
1938	Too Much Johnson	Frederic	
1940	Pop Always Pays	Hayes	
1940	Citizen Kane trailer	Himself, Herbert Carter	Short
1941	Andy Hardy's Private Secretary	Mr. Bossiny	Uncredited
1941	Citizen Kane	Herbert Carter / Screening Room Reporter	
1941	Appointment for Love	Hastings's butler	Uncredited
1942	The Wife Takes a Flyer	Jan	
1942	The Magnificent Ambersons	Roger Bronson	
1943	Jane Eyre	Mr. Briggs	Uncredited
1944	Uncertain Glory	Drover	Uncredited
1944	Mr. Skeffington	Dr. Fawcette	
1944	Enemy of Women	Levine	Uncredited
1944	Ministry of Fear	George Rennit	
1945	A Tree Grows in Brooklyn	Undertaker	Uncredited
1945	Spellbound	Dr. Galt	Uncredited
1945	Girls of the Big House	Professor O'Neill	
1946	From This Day Forward	Higgler	
1946	Without Reservations	Timothy Helgelander	Uncredited
1946	The Stranger	Party guest	Uncredited
1946	Crack-Up	Barton	
1946	Angel on My Shoulder	Minister	
1946	The Best Years of Our Lives	Bullard	
1947	Possessed	Dr. Max Sherman	
1947	Mourning Becomes Electra	Josiah Borden	
1947	The Lady from Shanghai	Judge	
1948	The Voice of the Turtle	Storekeeper	
1948	You Were Meant for Me	Dr. Frank R. Smith	Uncredited
1948	Letter from an Unknown Woman	Porter	
1948	Texas, Brooklyn and Heaven	Dr. Danson	Uncredited
1948	They Live by Night	Doctor	Uncredited
1948	Macbeth	Duncan	
1948	Kidnapped	Rankeillor	
1948	Wake of the Red Witch	Dokter Van Arken	
1949	Your Show Time (TV)		"The Invisible Wound"
1949	Impact	Dr. Henry Bender	
1949	Night Unto Night	Dr. Gallen Altheim	
1949	The Woman on Pier 13	Desk Clerk at Christine's Apartment	Uncredited
1950	Sierra	Judge Prentiss	
1951	The Company She Keeps	Planetarium Guide	Uncredited
1952	My Son John	Professor	(scenes deleted)

== Radio credits ==
Date	Title	Role	Notes
July 25, 1938	The Mercury Theatre on the Air	The President	"A Tale of Two Cities"
September 5, 1938	The Mercury Theatre on the Air	Secretary	"The Man Who Was Thursday"
December 24, 1939	The Campbell Playhouse		"A Christmas Carol"
March 17, 1940	The Campbell Playhouse		"Huckleberry Finn"
April 6, 1941	The Free Company	Colonel Egenhorn	"His Honor, the Mayor"
October 6, 1941	The Orson Welles Show		
October 20, 1941	The Orson Welles Show		
December 22, 1941	The Orson Welles Show		
