= Oh, What a Night (1935 film) =

- Directed by: Frank Richardson
- Written by: Ernest Denny (play); Frank Richardson
- Produced by: Edward G. Whiting
- Starring: Nina Boucicault; James Carew; Valerie Hobson
- Production company: British Sound Film Productions
- Distributed by: Universal Pictures
- Release date: March 1935
- Running time: 58 minutes
- Country: United Kingdom
- Language: English

Oh, What a Night is a 1935 British comedy film directed by Frank Richardson and starring Nina Boucicault, James Carew and Valerie Hobson. It was written by Richardson based on the play by Ernest Denny, and was a quota quickie made at Wembley Studios.

== Preservation status ==
The British Film Institute National Archive holds no stills or ephemera, and no film or video materials.

== Plot ==
Marmaduke Gregory vanishes just as his wealthy sheep-farmer father arrives from Australia to offer him a job. To save the day, Mrs. Gregory's two daughters bring a young man suffering from amnesia into the house, planning to pass him off as Marmaduke, since the father has not seen his son in fifteen years. For a while, the deception works, but complications arise when the real Marmaduke returns from a secret honeymoon. Fortunately, despite the confusion, everything ultimately works out for the best.

== Cast ==
- Nina Boucicault as Althea Gregory
- James Carew as Mortimer B. Gregory
- Valerie Hobson as Susan
- Kathleen Kelly as Miss Wyley
- Molly Lamont as Pat
- Stanella Perry
- Ernest Stidwell as Dawson
- Roland Culver

== Reception ==
Kine Weekly wrote: "Here is just another quota quickie, a feeble comedy with gags and situations clumsily borrowed from old fashioned farce and the music-hall. The plot has little or no point, the treatment as indefinite, and the acting indifferent. It is hopelessly and irreparably deficient in entertainment."

The Daily Film Renter wrote: "The plot structure in this effort is a trifle on the flimsy side, most of the humour being derived from 'wrong bedroom' business and the misunderstandings consequent upon the masquerade. ... Settings and technical details are adequate."

Picturegoer wrote: "Old-fashioned farce with slapstick interludes clumsily developed and containing little real humour in its threadbare situations."
