= Adele Poston =

American psychiatric nurse

- Poston in World War I army uniform
- Born: September 7, 1884; Springdale, Arkansas
- Died: May 15, 1979 (aged 94); St. Petersburg, Florida
- Occupation: Psychiatric nurse
- Years active: 1906 to 1970s
- Notable work: Served in WWI as Chief Nurse, Base Hospital 117, France. Founded the first Psychiatric Nurses Bureau in New York City; founded the Adele Poston Agency

Adele Suyder Poston Sanford (September 7, 1884 – May 15, 1979) was a leading psychiatric nurse in the United States and Chief Nurse at Army Base Hospital 117 in La Fauche, France, during World War I. As Chief Nurse of the first and most significant psychiatric hospital to be near the front lines in a war, she (and the nurses she supervised) treated soldiers with shell-shock (now called post-traumatic stress disorder) and "war neurosis".

Poston founded the first Psychiatric Nurses Bureau in New York City and led the Adele Poston Agency of New York City until her retirement in her 80s.

== Personal life ==
Poston's great-great-great-grandmother was Mary Thornton, an aunt of George Washington; her great-great-great-grandfather was Brigadier General William Woodford, who fought in the Revolutionary War. Through this connection, Poston was able to obtain membership in the Daughters of the American Revolution. Her parents had two children before she was born, Edwin and Mary Elizabeth (who died as an infant). Her mother, Mary Kate Elmore Poston, died when Adele was nine years old. In 1904, Poston applied to and was accepted by the Passavant Memorial Area Hospital School of Nursing in Jacksonville, Illinois. She graduated in 1906, at the age of 22.

In 1941, Poston married actor Erskine Sanford, but the marriage lasted only a short time. A first cousin once removed, Ellen Kerr Houston, her husband Raymond Woodard Houston (a social worker who rose to be Commissioner of Social Welfare for the State of New York), and their three sons remained the closest family members to Poston over her lifetime.

== Professional life ==
=== Early career ===
Florence Nightingale was a role model for Poston and may have influenced her decision to become a nurse, as, probably, did her Seventh-day Adventist family roots. After graduating from Passavant Memorial Area Hospital School of Nursing, Poston took the Civil Service test and became the first woman in Illinois to pass the exam. She then was hired as the Superintendent of Nurses Training at Jacksonville State Hospital, a hospital started by the social reformer Dorothea Dix. She also worked at Eastern State Hospital for the Insane in Kankakee, Illinois. She spent time at Hull House in Chicago, the settlement house started by Jane Addams and Ellen Gates Starr. She was taught by these social reformers, as well as by Dr. Alice Hamilton and Julia Lathrop, whom she later described as "my guiding light."

In 1912, Poston moved to New York and became the first Superintendent of Nurses Training at Bloomingdale Hospital, and in the following year, the first Directress of Nurses. Bloomingdale Hospital was the 300-bed free-standing psychiatric hospital of The New York Hospital (now named NewYork–Presbyterian Hospital). The hospital had relocated in 1894 from Manhattan to the more pastoral setting of White Plains. In 1913, Poston wrote an article called Mental Nursing in the American Journal of Nursing and during these years she spoke at various nursing conferences on her special area of interest and expertise, psychiatric nursing.

=== War service ===
In 1917, during World War I, Poston joined the American Red Cross as a local volunteer. In 1918 she was recruited to find and train a hundred nurses from around the country to serve the emotional needs of soldiers overseas. She was then commissioned to be the Chief Nurse of Army Base Hospital 117 in La Fauche, France, and sailed from Ellis Island in June 1918. Her hospital was the most important psychiatric hospital close to the front lines. In a personal letter to the Medical Director at Bloomingdale Hospital, she wrote that the hospital was so close to the front that "we could hear the big Berthas."

For her service during the war, she was in 1926 awarded the Distinguished Service Medal (DSM). The citation that accompanied this award states: "... The President of the United States of America ... has awarded to Adele S. Poston The Distinguished Service Medal for Exceptionally Meritorious and Distinguished Services in the performance of duties of great responsibility as Chief Nurse, Army Nurse Corps, United States Army, with the American Expeditionary Forces as Chief Nurse of Base Hospital No. 117, at La Fauche, France." The citation noted that "by her professional efficiency, untiring energy, and tact, she made a large contribution to the success of this novel and highly important hospital of the American Expeditionary Forces."

=== Post-war years ===
Returning from France in March 1919, Poston resumed her work as Director of Nursing Services at Bloomingdale Hospital. In 1920, after the 100th anniversary pageant and celebration of the birth of Florence Nightingale, Poston announced her resignation effective 1921. For several years, Poston worked with Dr. George Henry, the Director of Clinical Research at Bloomingdale Hospital, and published a chapter on psychiatric nursing inEssentials of Psychiatry (1925), edited by Henry. In his book 100 Years of American Psychiatry, Edward Strecker assesses the role of the nursing services at Bloomingdale thus: "the nurses from Bloomingdale Hospital rendered yeoman service in raising psychiatry nursing standards to a higher level". Poston returned to Europe by ship after the Great War.

In 1926 Poston founded the Psychiatric Nurses Bureau in New York City. This was the first agency specifically designed to match private duty psychiatric nurses with patients in both homes and hospitals. Subsequently, Poston broadened the scope of the agency to include nurses in other specialties and changed the name of the bureau to The Adele Poston Agency.

She led this organization for over forty years, maintaining high standards for both RNs and LPNs. The business continues to this day.

Poston retired from the Agency and moved from New York to Florida in the early 1970s. There she returned to her military past, joining the Veterans of World War I Legion Post in Dunedin, Florida. She continued to give interviews and talks about the compassionate care of psychiatric patients and her service during World War I until she was well into her 90s.

== Death ==
Poston died May 15, 1979, in St. Petersburg, Florida.

== Published works ==
- Mental Nursing. American Journal of Nursing 14 (November 1913), 95–98.
- Psychiatric Nursing. In George W. Henry, Essentials of Psychiatry (1925). Waverly Press for The Williams and Wilkins Company: Baltimore.
- Some Specialists: Eloise Shields, RN, BS. American Journal of Nursing 31. (1931) Vol 31, No. 2, pp. 214–215.
- Practical Nurse Education and Mental Hygiene. Practical Nursing (n.d.) 5, 17.
- The Practical Nurse and the Psychiatric Patient. Practical Nurses Digest (n.d.). (One page)
- What To Expect of a Nurses' Registry. Practical Nurses Digest (March 1964).
