= The Corsican Brothers (play) =

Play by Dion Boucicault

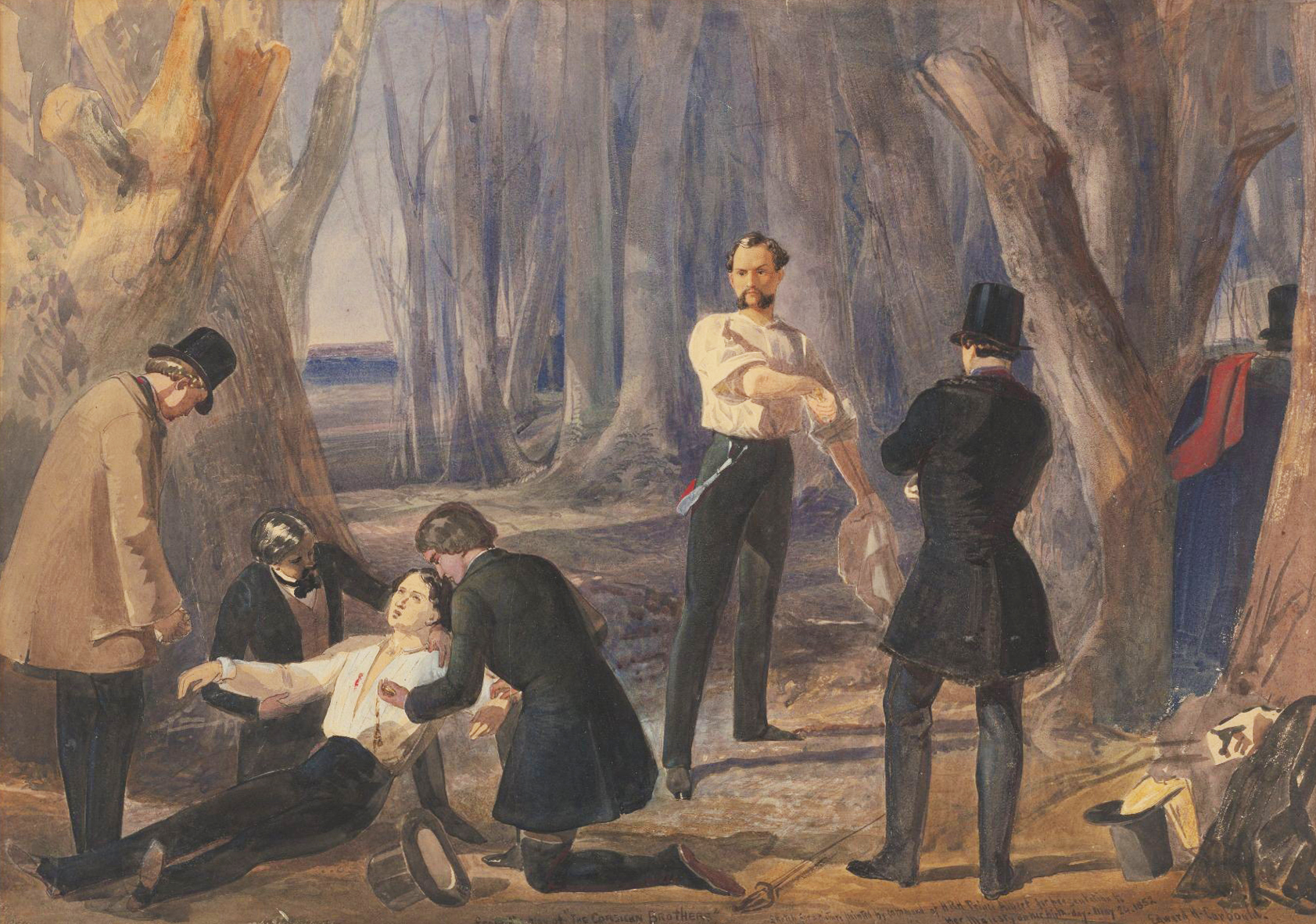
A scene from The Corsican Brothers, painted by Edward Henry Corbould

The Corsican Brothers; or, the Fatal Duel is a play by Dion Boucicault, first seen in 1852. It is a melodrama based on a French dramatization of the 1844 novella by Alexandre Dumas.

== Background ==
From 1850 Dion Boucicault was employed by the actor Charles Kean, who leased the Princess's Theatre, London, as the house dramatist. Boucicault, fluent in French, travelled to France to find plays he could adapt for the English stage; a result of this was The Corsican Brothers, adapted from the 1850 play Les Freres corses by Eugène Grangé and Xavier de Montépin.

The play, directed by Charles Kean, opened at the Princess's Theatre on 24 February 1852. Charles Kean played both of the brothers Fabien dei Franchi and Louis dei Franchi, and Alfred Wigan played Chateau-Renaud.

== Synopsis ==
Act I and Act II are understood as taking place at the same time. Each of the brothers Fabien dei Franchi and Louis dei Franchi are able to sense if the other is in danger.

Act I

At his home in a castle in Corsica, Fabien dei Franchi becomes aware that his brother Louis, in Paris, is in danger. At the end of the act, after making peace between feuding local families, he has a vision of Louis' death in a duel. He sends the family's servant, Griffo, to Paris to fetch news of his brother's fate.

Act II

The events leading to the duel are described. Louis has travelled to Paris to find Emilie de L'Esparre, a woman whom both brothers loved but only Louis pursued. She has married, and he vows to accept the situation; her husband admires Louis' honesty in admitting the past affair, and asks him to protect her while he is away.

Chateau-Renaud, known as a womanizer and duellist, is pursuing Madame L'Esparre, and he challenges Louis to a duel. In the Forest of Fontainebleau, Louis is wounded in the ensuing sword fight; before he dies he tells his second that his brother will avenge his death.

Act III

Chateau-Renaud, with his friend and second Baron de Montgiron, try to flee the country, but their carriage crashes in the same clearing in the forest. Fabien dei Franchi appears: they think it is the ghost of Louis until he introduces himself. After a long sword fight, Chateau-Renaud is stabbed through the heart by Fabien. At the end, the ghost of Louis appears once more.

== Critical reception ==
George Henry Lewes wrote: "Charles Kean... seems now... settling down into the conviction that his talent does not lie in any Shakespearian sphere whatever, but in melodrames.... Charles Kean plays the two brothers; and you must see him before you will believe how well and quietly he plays them; preserving a gentlemany demeanour, a drawingroom manner very difficult to assume on the stage, if one may judge from its rarity, which intensifies the passion of the part, and gives it a terrible reality.... The duel between him and Wigan was a masterpiece on both sides; the Bois de Boulogne itself has scarcely seen a duel more real or more exciting...."

A special sort of trap door, afterwards known as a Corsican trap, glide trap or ghost glide, was made for the play. It gave the impression of a ghost gliding across the stage as it rose up through the floor. It was an important part of the play's success, and was installed in theatres where the play was produced.

"First the head was seen, and then, as it slowly ascended higher and higher, the figure advanced, increasing in stature as it neared him, and the profound silence of the audience denoted how wrapt was their attention. Melodramatic effect was never more perfectly produced".

The play was very successful: it soon ran at other London theatres, and in the following months it opened at the Adelphi Theatre in Edinburgh and at the Queen's Royal Theatre in Dublin. At the Princess's Theatre it had 236 performances during Kean's eight-year tenancy.

Queen Victoria saw the play several times, and Prince Albert commissioned Edward Henry Corbould to paint a scene from the play.
