= Laura Hope Crews =

American stage and film actress (1879–1942)

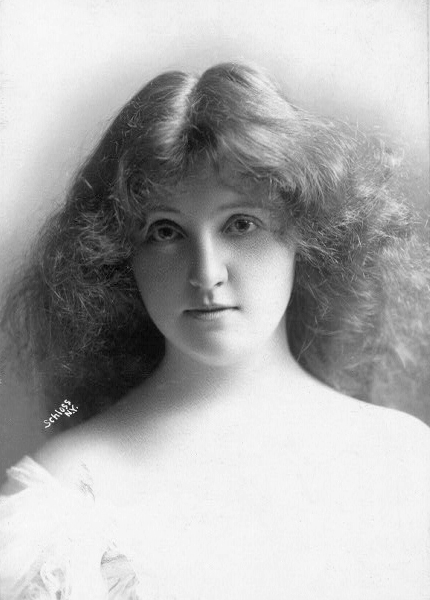
- Crews in 1910
- Born: December 12, 1879; San Francisco, California, U.S.
- Died: November 12, 1942 (aged 62); New York City, U.S.
- Resting place: Cypress Lawn Memorial Park
- Occupation: Actress
- Years active: 1884–1942

Laura Hope Crews (December 12, 1879 – November 12, 1942) was an American actress. Although she is best remembered today for her later work as a character actress in motion pictures of the 1930s, she also was prolific on stage; among her films roles was the role of Aunt Pittypat in Gone with the Wind.

== Early life ==
Crews was the daughter of stage actress Angelena Lockwood and backstage carpenter John Thomas Crews. She had three older siblings. Crews started acting at age four. Her first stage appearance was at Woodward's Gardens. She stopped acting to finish school and then returned to acting in 1898. As she was a native San Franciscan, the records pertaining to her early life were destroyed in the earthquake and fire of 1906.

Most of Crews' formal education came in San Jose, as the family had moved there following the remarriage of Crews' mother.

== Career ==
In 1898, Crews performed in San Francisco as an ingenue with the Alcazar Stock Company. Two years later, she and her mother moved to New York City, where Crews began to act with the Henry V. Donnelly Stock Company.

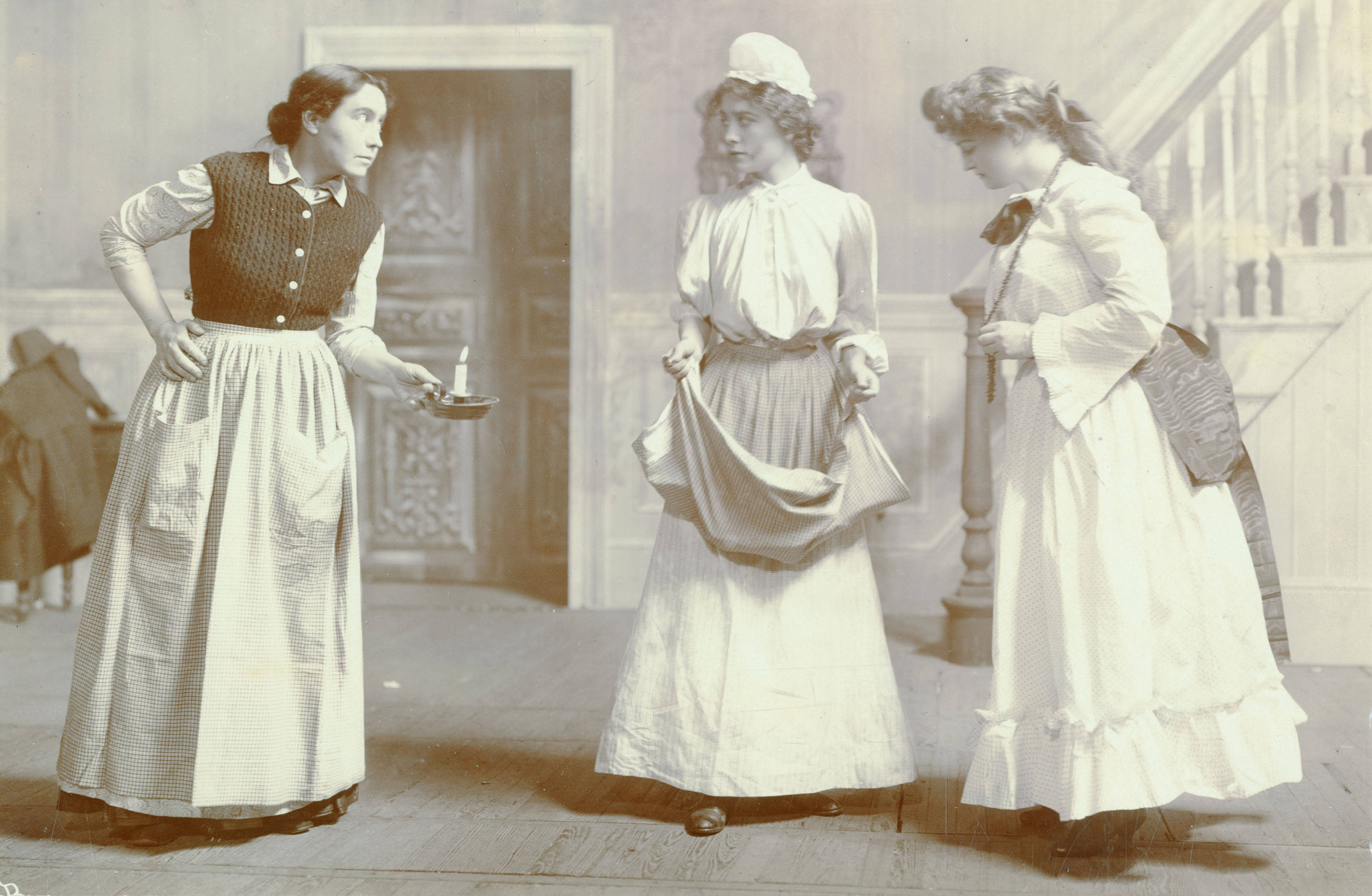
Merely Mary Ann (1903): l to r Ada Dwyer, Eleanor Robson, Laura H. Crews

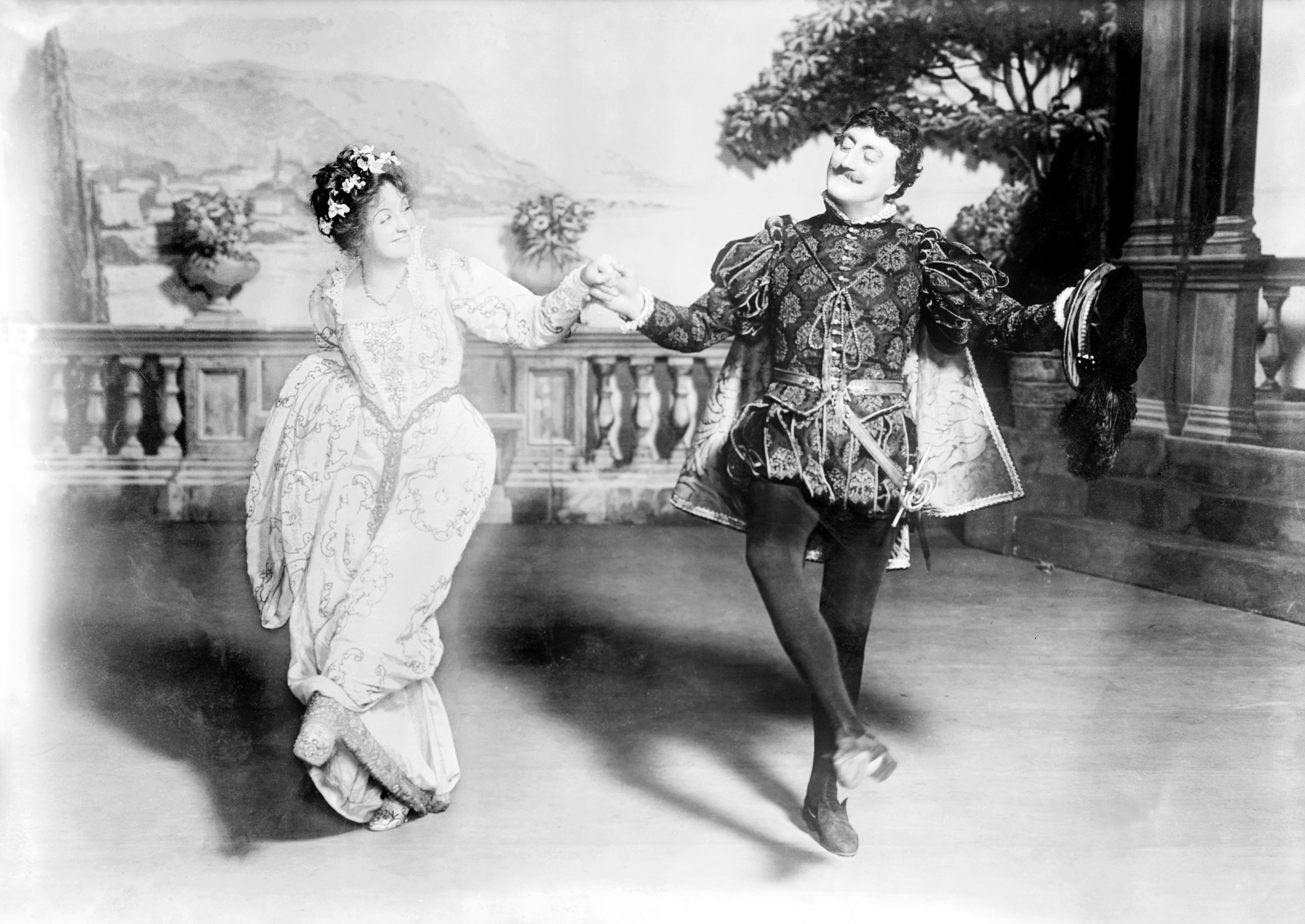
Crews and John Drew Jr. in Much Ado About Nothing (1913)

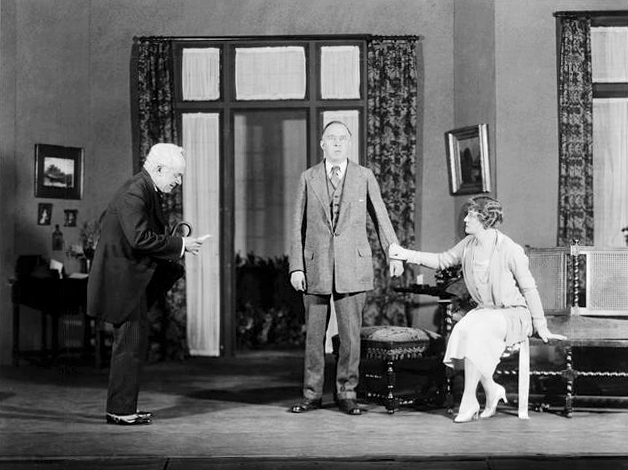
Erskine Sanford, Dudley Digges and Crews in the Theatre Guild production of A. A. Milne's Mr. Pim Passes By (1921)

Crews appeared in plays written by A.A. Milne, who was particularly impressed by her work in his Mr. Pim Passes By (1921). The play was a big success and ran for 232 performances on Broadway. In 1924 she starred in The Werewolf for a run of 112 Broadway performances.

Crews also starred as Judith Bliss in the original Broadway production of Noël Coward's Hay Fever (1925), which she co-directed with Coward. She also appeared in The Silver Cord, written by Sidney Howard, which was produced by the New York Theater Guild in 1926 and ran for 212 performances. When The Silver Cord was not being presented, there were matinee performances of Right You Are If You Think You Are by Luigi Pirandello.

The Silver Cord was later made into a 1933 RKO movie with Crews reprising her onstage role of the mother. The film co-starred Joel McCrea, Frances Dee, and Irene Dunne. In the late 1920s, and because of her years as a stage actress, Crews had been hired as a voice coach by Gloria Swanson to help with her transition to talking pictures.

George Cukor, who had directed her in Camille (1936), recommended her for the role of Aunt Pittypat in Gone with the Wind (1939) after Billie Burke declined it. Cukor wanted Crews to play the role "in a Billie Burke-ish manner" with "the same zany feeling".

Her final stage appearance came in 1942, in the original Broadway run of Arsenic and Old Lace in which she replaced one of the original cast members. She stayed with the production for more than a year and a half on Broadway and in a touring company before she was forced to leave because of illness.

== Death ==
Crews died in the LeRoy Sanitarium in New York City in 1942, following an illness of four months. Some sources say that the illness in which she suffered from was kidney failure. She was laid to rest at Cypress Lawn Memorial Park in Colma, California.

Crews has a star at 6251 Hollywood Boulevard on the Hollywood Walk of Fame.

Crews was also the first credited cast member of Gone with the Wind to die.

== Filmography ==
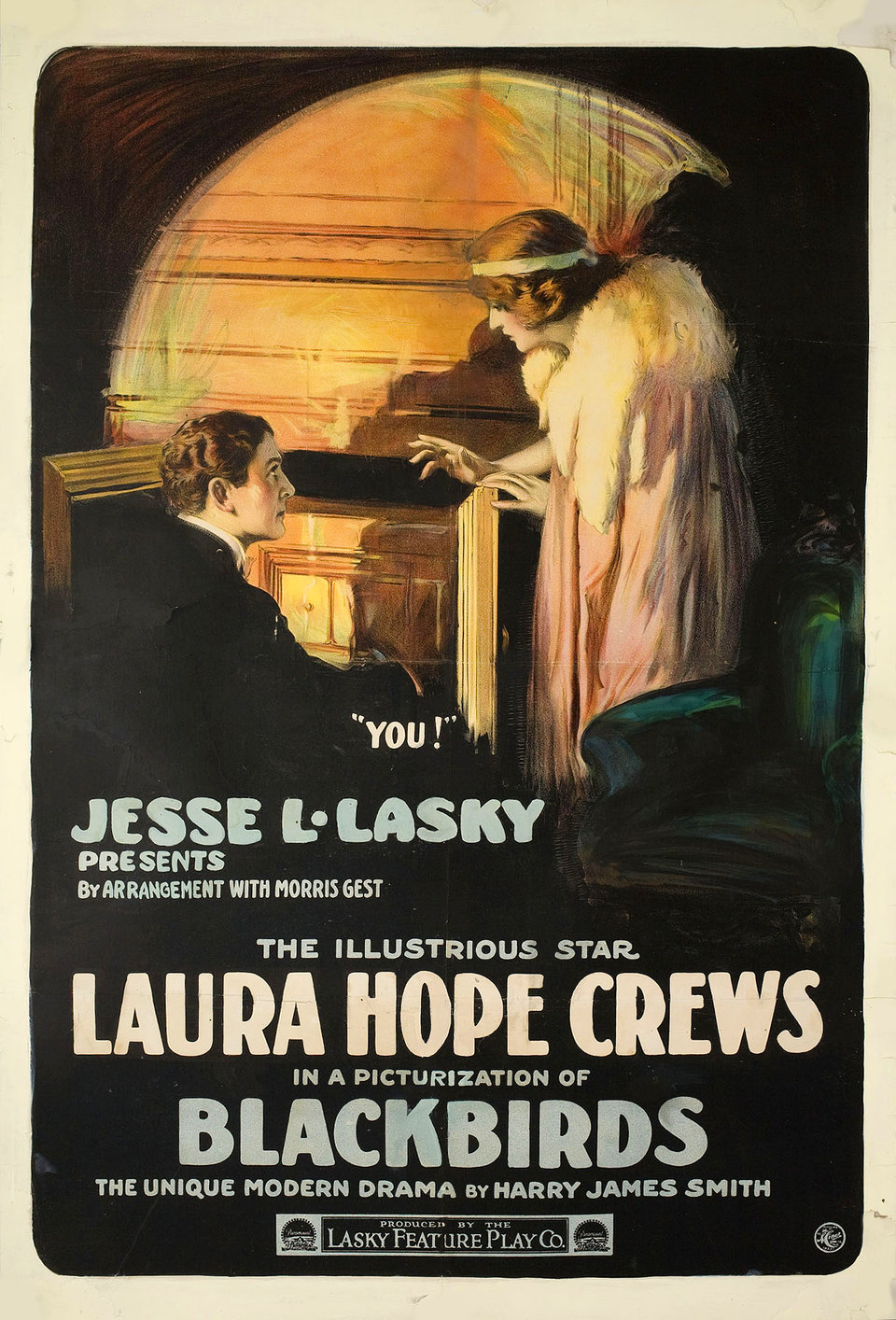
Blackbirds, a 1915 silent film produced by Jesse Lasky

Silent
| Year | Title | Role | Notes |
|---|---|---|---|
| 1915 | The Fighting Hope | Anna Granger | Famous Players–Lasky / Paramount, Extant; incomplete, BFI London |
| 1915 | Blackbirds | Leonie Sobatsky | Famous Players–Lasky / Paramount, Extant; Library of Congress |

Sound
| Year | Title | Role | Notes |
|---|---|---|---|
| 1929 | Charming Sinners | Mrs. Carr | |
| 1932 | New Morals for Old | Mrs. Thomas | |
| 1933 | Out All Night | Mrs. Jane Colgate | |
| 1933 | The Silver Cord | Mrs. Phelps | |
| 1933 | I Loved You Wednesday | Doc Mary Hanson | |
| 1933 | Blind Adventure | Lady Rockingham | |
| 1933 | Rafter Romance | Elise | |
| 1933 | Ever in My Heart | Grandma Caroline Archer | |
| 1933 | If I Were Free | Dame Evers | |
| 1934 | The Age of Innocence | Mrs. Welland | |
| 1934 | Lightning Strikes Twice | Aunt Jane Madison | |
| 1934 | Behold My Wife | Mrs. Hubert Carter | |
| 1935 | Escapade | Countess | |
| 1935 | The Melody Lingers On | Mother Superior | |
| 1936 | Her Master's Voice | Aunt Minnie Stickney | |
| 1936 | Camille | Prudence Duvernoy | |
| 1937 | The Road Back | Ernst's Aunt | |
| 1937 | Confession | Stella | |
| 1937 | Angel | Grand Duchess Anna Dmitrievna | |
| 1938 | Dr. Rhythm | Mrs. Minerva Twombling | |
| 1938 | The Sisters | Flora's Mother | |
| 1938 | Thanks for the Memory | Mrs. Kent | |
| 1939 | Idiot's Delight | Madame Zuleika | |
| 1939 | The Star Maker | Carlotta Salvini | |
| 1939 | The Rains Came | Lily Hoggett-Egburry | |
| 1939 | Reno | Mrs. Gardner | |
| 1939 | Remember? | Lettie Carruthers | |
| 1939 | Gone with the Wind | Aunt Pittypat Hamilton | |
| 1939 | The Hunchback of Notre Dame | Minor Role (uncredited) | |
| 1940 | The Blue Bird | Mrs. Luxury | |
| 1940 | Girl from Avenue A | Mrs. Forrester | |
| 1940 | I'm Nobody's Sweetheart Now | Mrs. Lowell | |
| 1940 | Lady with Red Hair | Mrs. Dudley | |
| 1941 | The Flame of New Orleans | Auntie | |
| 1941 | One Foot in Heaven | Mrs. Preston Thurston | |
| 1941 | New York Town | Apple Annie (uncredited) | |
