= Jeanie Deans (play) =

Jeanie Deans is a play written by Dion Boucicault based on Sir Walter Scott's 1818 novel, The Heart of Midlothian. It is named after the heroine of the novel, Jeanie Deans.

It was first produced on 9 January 1860 at Laura Keene's Theatre, New York City. It was produced in London at the Westminster Theatre on 26 January 1863 under the title of 'The Trial of Effie Deans', and in Edinburgh at the Theatre Royal in 1910. Alice Marriott played the part of Jeanie Deans many times: "her most artistic success."

Thomas Hailes Lacy seems to have incorporated Boucicault's play in a later publication entitled: The Heart of Mid-Lothian; or, the Sisters of St. Leonard's

The play was also published as 'The Trial of Effie Deans' or 'The Heart of Mid-Lothian', but they are definitely the same play as 'Jeanie Deans'.
