= The Phantom (play) =

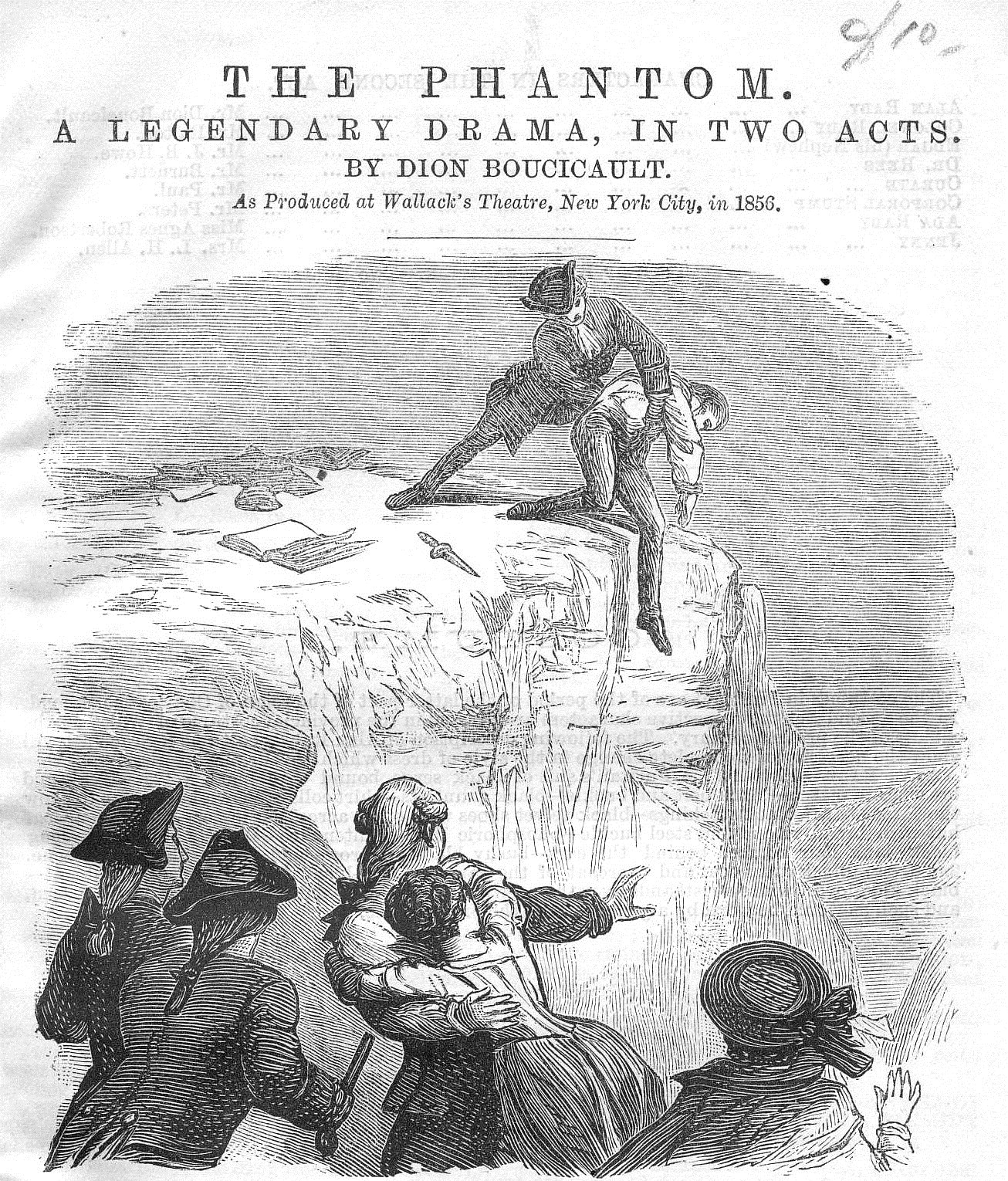
- Title page of prompt book
- Original language: English
- Written by: Dion Boucicault

Premiere
- Date: June 14, 1852
- Place: Princess's Theatre, London

The Phantom is a two act melodrama written by Dion Boucicault. It was originally titled The Vampire when it was first performed at the Princess's Theatre in London in 1852. Boucicault renamed it The Phantom when he went to the United States, where it opened in Philadelphia in 1856. The play tells the story of two different encounters with a mysterious phantom.

== Plot ==
The first act begins with two owners of an inn, Janet and Davy, on their wedding night. There is a big storm when the landlord's daughter Lucy Peveryl asks Davy to accompany her to the treacherous Raby Castle to see her love, Roland. The Ruins of the Raby, as the castle is commonly referred as, are abandoned and there is a legend that some sort of demon is there and anyone who goes inside is horrified to death.

Davy agrees cautiously to lead Lucy to the ruins of the Raby. They are joined by Lord Albert Clavering, Neville, Guy, Ellen, and Maude, who had all been staying at the inn. When the bridge that leads them to the castle is knocked down by the storm, they have to take shelter in the castle. There they meet a man who identifies as a puritan living in the castle. This is Alan Raby, who is the phantom demon described in the legends. Davy is suspicious, but the others are unbothered by his presence. After discovering Roland is dead, everyone is terrified as a scream is heard from Lucy's room. Lucy runs out of her room into Lord Clavering's arms and dies, appearing to have been murdered. Alan then comes out and is shot by Lord Clavering in the heart. Lord Clavering believes he has mistakenly shot a good puritan and obeys Alan's request to place his body in the moonlight. After the group leaves to return to the inn, Alan is seen resurrecting by the power of the moon.

The second act is set many years later and introduces Colonel Raby, Edgar, Dr. Reese and Ada Raby. Outside the castle, Colonel Raby announces that the village citizens will assemble in the castle, where he will wed Ada Raby. Stump and Jenny are introduced as lovers who reveal that Ada had died, but was brought back to life by a mysterious creature. When she was brought back to life, she never had the same personality as before. A will from Alan Raby is discovered and there is a case of Alan Raby being caught living longer than normal under different pen names. Alan forces Ada into a marriage ceremony, but Edgar challenges him to a duel. Alan is killed in the duel, and his body is cast into a dark abyss so the moon will never bring him back to life.

== History ==
The Phantom is published under Samuel French's Standard Drama, No. 165 (New York, 1856.) This play moved Boucicault into writing plays that were technically demanding. The Phantom is an adaption of Le Vampire, by Pierre Carmouche, Achile de Jouffroy, and Charles Nodier, which was published in Paris in 1820. Boucicault first titled the play The Vampire: a Phantasm Related in Three Dramas, then shortened and renamed.

The role of the Alan Raby/Phantom was written for Charles Kean, but he declined so it was played by Boucucault himself. After it was published in Paris in 1820, Boucicault adapted the story, shortening it to two acts and retitling it. The previous version included a third act that took place in the future.

This play was one of the first plays performed in America that looked at the supernatural and influenced our understanding of supernatural phenomenon in popular culture. As one of Boucicualt's minor plays, not a lot of writings about productions and critiques were found.

== Productions ==
As did many of Boucicault's plays, The Phantom was first produced in England. The play premiered on 14 June 1852 at The Princess's Theatre. It came to America in 1856, where it opened at the National Theatre in Philadelphia on 12 May 1856.

Boucicault then took the play to Wallack's Theatre in New York City, under the theatre manager William Stuart. In 1858, it played in Niblo's Garden. In New York City, The Phantom had a successful long run. It was a hit when it came to New York, with Boucicault's and Robertson's performances. In 1873, The Phantom was performed in Chicago at the McVicker's Theatre in 1873.

=== Cast and characters ===
Character	Wallack's Theatre, New York City 1856	McVicker's Theatre, Chicago 1873
The Phantom	Mr. Dion Boucicault	Mr. Dion Boucicault
Lord Albert Clavering	Mr. J. B. Howe	Mr. James O'Neill
Sir Hugh Neville, of Graystock	Mr. Ralton	Mr. C. Alexander
Sir Guy Musgrave	Mr. Etynge	Mr. O. W. Holmes
Ralph Gwynne	Mr. Levere	Mr. G. Roscoe
Davy	Mr. T. B. Johnstone	Mr. O. W. Blake
Lucy Peveryl	Miss Agnes Robertson	Miss Agnes Robertson
Ellen	Miss Alleyne	Miss. Emma Marblo
Maude	Miss Ada Clare	Miss Julia Barrington
Janet	Mrs. H. P. Grattan	Miss Clara Stoneall
Alan Raby	Mr. Dion Boucicault	Mr. Dion Boucicault
Colonel Raby	Mr. Ralton	Mr. James O'Neill
Edgar, (his nephew)	Mr. J. B. Howe	Mr. W. H. Power
Dr. Reese	Mr. Burnett	Mr. M. Lanagan
Curate	Mr. Paul	N/A
Corporal Stump	Mr. Peters	Mr. E. Barry
Ada Raby	Miss Agnes Robertson	Miss Agnes Robertson
Jenny	Mrs. L. H. Allen	Miss Phosa McAllister

== Reception ==
In the second week of the engagement at the McVicker's Theatre, a reviewer for the Chicago Daily Tribune wrote: "Only moderately successful in attendance, though the quality of the entertainment offered might reasonably be expected to call out an unusually large patronage". Before the show, there were short farces, following with Mrs. Boucicault portraying "One of the most charming characters in "Milly, the Maid with the Milking Pail," and with "Kerry," Mr. Boucicault's masterpiece (as a writer and actor). The phantom "The most weird, thrilling, and intensely sensational of all Mr. Boucicault’s plays."

Mrs. M. E. W. Sherwood's review in The New York Times, 20 January 1875: "Then . . . comes a vision of Boucicault playing the 'Vampire,' a dreadful and weird thing played with immortal genius. That great playwright would not have died unknown had he never done anything but flap his bat-like wings in that dream-disturbing piece.'"
