= The Silver Cord (film) =

1933 film by John Cromwell

- Directed by: John Cromwell
- Screenplay by: Jane Murfin
- Based on: The Silver Cord; 1926 play by Sidney Howard
- Produced by: Pandro S. Berman; Merian C. Cooper
- Starring: Irene Dunne; Laura Hope Crews; Joel McCrea
- Cinematography: Charles Rosher
- Edited by: George Nicholls, Jr.
- Music by: Max Steiner
- Distributed by: RKO Radio Pictures
- Release date: May 5, 1933
- Running time: 74 minutes
- Country: United States
- Language: English

The Silver Cord is a 1933 American pre-Code drama film produced and released by RKO Radio Pictures, and directed by John Cromwell. It was based on the 1926 Broadway play The Silver Cord by Sidney Howard that starred Laura Hope Crews as an overly possessive mother.

Crews reprises her domineering mother role in this film with Joel McCrea and Irene Dunne as her son and daughter-in-law. Another Hollywood film dealing with an overbearing mother figure was Broken Laws (1924), produced by and starring Dorothy Davenport.

== Plot ==
A domineering matriarch is less than happy when her son brings home his new bride. She immediately sets to work at sabotaging their marriage as well as the engagement of her younger and weaker son. Married for five months, Americans Christina and David Phelps, a biologist and aspiring architect respectively, live in Heidelberg where Christina has been working in a research lab, this stint in Europe being two years for David where he has been able to stretch his wings to start to find his own footing. They decide to move back to the US, specifically to New York City, when David is offered a job there with one of the most prestigious architecture firms and where Christina had previously been offered a job with the Rockefeller Institute. They decide to make an extended visit to the Phelps country home en route so that Christina can meet his family of his long widowed mother, his younger brother Rob, and Rob's fiancée Hester. What Christina is unaware of is that she is in for the biggest fight of her life in Mrs. Phelps, a manipulative, controlling woman who has substituted her two sons for the lack of happiness in what was her own marriage, her expectation that they will be solely by her side for the rest of her life. There are a few things working on Christina's side as compared to Hester, whose own engagement to Rob is also threatened: a few years in age and thus experience; the fact that she and David are already married with a child on the way; and that unlike Rob, David has had those two years away from his mother when he may have been able to see her actions more clearly in being for her own selfish goals than for either him or Rob. But even these items may not be enough to overcome David's "love" for his "self-sacrificing" mother.

== Cast ==
- Irene Dunne as Christina Phelps
- Joel McCrea as David Phelps
- Laura Hope Crews as Mrs. Phelps
- Eric Linden as Robert Phelps
- Frances Dee as Hester

unbilled

- Helen Cromwell as Delia
- Paul Irving as Taxicab Driver
- Perry Ivins as Phelps Family Doctor
- Reinhold Pasch as Lab Technician
- Gustav von Seyffertitz as German Doctor

== Production ==
Director John Cromwell welcomed the opportunity to adapt The Silver Cord to the screen as he had directed Sidney Howard's play in its 1926 Broadway production. Film historian Kingsley Canham reports that Cromwell “felt that he could pull it off better than any other [film] director.”

Joel McCrea and Frances Dee first met during filming, and would be married soon after in October 1933. They remained married for 57 years, until McCrea's death.

== External ==
- The Silver Cord at IMDb
- The Silver Cord at the TCM Movie Database (archived)
- The Silver Cord at the AFI Catalog of Feature Films
- 1946 Theatre Guild on the Air radio adaptation of original play at Internet Archive
