= Mr. Pim Passes By =

Play by A. A. Milne

Left to right: Dion Boucicault (Mr Pim), Ben Webster (George) and Irene Vanbrugh (Olivia), 1920

Mr Pim Passes By is a three act comedy by A. A. Milne, first produced in 1919, and seen in the West End in 1920 and on Broadway and in Australia in 1921. There were later stage revivals in London and New York, and the play has been adapted for radio, television and cinema.

The play centres on the turbulence in a respectable English household when the fallible memory of an elderly visitor leads a husband and wife to believe that they may inadvertently be bigamously married.

== Production ==
The play was first performed on 1 December 1919, at the Gaiety Theatre, Manchester. It then opened, with cast changes, at the New Theatre, London on 5 January 1920, and transferred to the Garrick Theatre (2 February–24 April) and the Playhouse Theatre (25 April–31 July), for a total run of 246 performances.

=== Cast ===
	Manchester	London
George Marden, JP	Ben Webster	Ben Webster
Olivia (his wife)	Irene Vanbrugh	Irene Vanbrugh
Dinah (his niece)	Georgette Cohan	Georgette Cohan
Lady Marden (his aunt)	Sybil Carlisle	Ethel Griffies
Brian Strange	Philip Easton	Leslie Howard
Carraway Pim	Dion Boucicault	Dion Boucicault
Anne	Ethel Wellesley	Ethel Wellesley

Source: Playscript

== Plot ==
The play takes place at the Marden house in Buckinghamshire.

=== Act I ===
The title character, Mr Carraway Pim, arrives at the Marden house to deliver a letter of introduction for George and is received first by Anne, then by Dinah, who tells Mr Pim about her life (including her engagement the night before) and the lives of her uncle George and aunt Olivia. Brian enters and converses with Dinah about his attempts to tell her uncle about their engagement. Olivia enters, having overheard part of the conversation, and is delighted to learn of the engagement. She offers to help break the news to her husband.

Mr Pim arrives, 1920

George enters, seeking out Mr Pim, who has since left; Olivia pushes the young couple to tell George of their engagement. While Olivia is optimistic about their future, George is heavily set against it, citing Brian's young, slow career as a "futuristic" artist as evidence that he and Dinah will be unable to support each other. George and Brian continue to clash on Brian's career, and George's views on marriage and politics before Olivia sends Brian and Dinah out for a walk. While they are out, Olivia tries to convince George of his hypocrisy and pessimism by questioning him on the motives behind their marriage, as well as their financial well-being. George stumbles and struggles to find answers for her questions while still justifying his decision regarding Brian and Dinah, while also becoming more and more impatient and uncomfortable with the black-and-orange curtains Olivia is sewing and planning to hang up. Olivia reminds George of the first man she fell in love with, and how her father had arranged for her to marry someone else, which resulted in a miserable marriage until her husband died.

After George leaves, Brian and Dinah come back. Olivia tells them that she thinks George will be fine with their marriage, though George hasn't made much progress in accepting them. Olivia also reminds them that Lady Marden is coming for lunch, after which Mr Pim returns. George returns to receive him. While talking to George and Olivia, Mr Pim tells them that he had just returned from a trip to Australia, and while on his way back, he had seen a man whom he had thought dead. He tells them the man's name was Telworthy, which was the name of Olivia's first husband, who had also lived (and was presumed to have died) in Australia. Before George and Olivia can consider the implications of this, Lady Marden arrives.

=== Act II ===
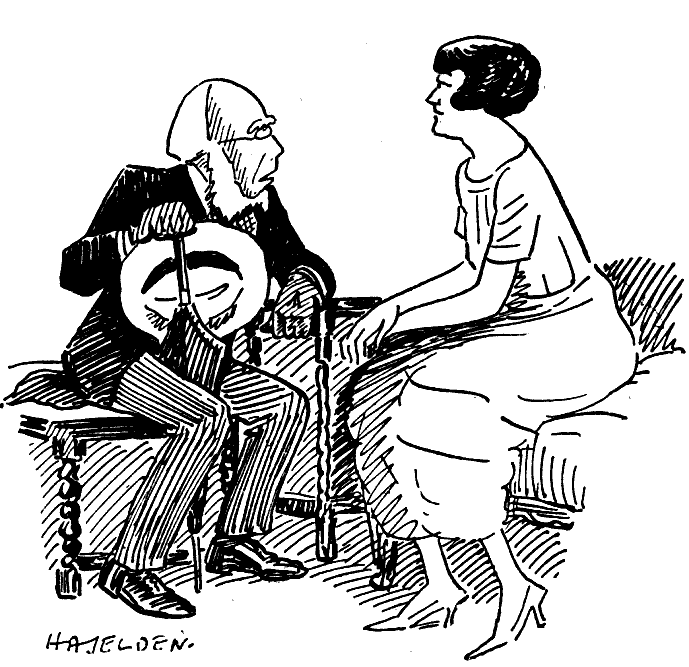
Punch sketch of Boucicault and Vanbrugh, 1920 London

Olivia, Lady Marden, Dinah, George, and Brian prepare to have lunch on their terrace, as Anne follows with their coffee. Brian and Dinah retreat back indoors, where they again speak of their concerns about their marriage and George. Not long after, Olivia, George, and Lady Marden return inside. Olivia asks Dinah to show Lady Marden "the pigs" (which George keeps as pets) and they are joined by Brian. Alone at last, Olivia and George begin to tentatively discuss the news Mr Pim had brought them in Act I.

At first, George is in denial about the entire revelation, but Olivia reminds him that her late husband was the only Telworthy in Australia, so it must have been true. George then laments over having married Olivia while she was still another's wife, and expresses his desire to get their marriage annulled for the sake of the law and their publicity. Olivia reacts to this with some sadness and disbelief. She reminds him that they were happy together, and that she was happy to be away from her first husband. When George holds his position on the annulment, she begins to talk about going back to live with her first husband, which begins to make George angry and jealous. He tells her he doesn't want to send her away, but that he still feels as if he should because it is the right thing to do. They eventually decide to send for Mr Pim again, and consult Lady Marden.

Dinah returns for a brief moment before being sent by George to fetch Lady Marden and Brian, who are still outside. Before they all return, George is conflicted about whether to tell Dinah and Brian about Olivia's situation, but Olivia tells him that they should know. Upon hearing the news, Lady Marden is shocked, and refers to Olivia as a "bigamist," while Brian argues that George should fight for Olivia and prevent her from going back to her miserable marriage. Despite this, Lady Marden agrees that the marriage should be annulled, to the disgust of Brian, which causes him to land in another argument with George over morals and marriage before being sent out for another walk with Dinah. George again laments over his confusion; he understands that Olivia does not want to go back to her first husband, but he wants to do the right thing in the eyes of the law and public opinion. Olivia laments over George, the man she "didn't quite marry" in a last-chance-attempt to get him to fight for her. Mr Pim is then announced by Anne.

Mr Pim joins Lady Marden, George, and Olivia, who question him about Mr Telworthy again. After confirming it was him whom Mr Pim spoke of, they tell him of the situation regarding George's and Olivia's marriage, and ask Mr Pim where Mr Telworthy might be. Mr Pim tells them that after seeing him a few days before, Mr Telworthy had died in Marseille by choking on a fish-bone. Olivia jumps up in surprise and joy.

=== Act III ===
Brian and Dinah, 1920

Olivia and George marvel over this new revelation, while Mr Pim regrets having delivered shocking news to the same family twice in one day. George hastily shows a still apologetic Mr Pim out, after which he expresses his relief and joy over Olivia's first husband still having died. Olivia puts a damper on the celebration when she reminds George that she was still technically married to her first husband up until a few days ago, when he was said to have perished by Mr Pim. George, however, has changed his attitude of anxiousness to one of optimism, remarking to Olivia that they can just remarry quietly at the registry office in London the following day.

Olivia, deciding to have a bit of fun, suggests that George ought to propose to her again if he wishes to marry her again. The two approach each other and become engaged while putting on the shy, cheeky demeanour of a new young couple. Olivia further taunts George by inquiring whether he can afford to support a wife, and whether he is thinking about their future, as "love may seem to be all that matters" with a new engagement. George grows impatient, realising that Olivia is using the situation to change his mind about Brian and Dinah's engagement. After arguing about whether Olivia will accept George's proposal, or whether she would stay in his house should she refuse it, George storms off in anger. Mr Pim uses this opportunity to return – this time, by the window – hoping to leave before George returns. He tells Olivia that he got the name wrong since the beginning – the man whom he had known from Australia, whom he had met on his way back, and whom had died from choking on a fish-bone was named Pelwittle, not Telworthy as he had led everyone to believe. He explains to Olivia how Dinah that told him of Olivia and her previous marriage to Telworthy and her residence in Australia with him, which had led to his mixing up the two names.

Olivia confirms that Mr Telworthy had indeed died before she'd married George, and while she thanks Mr Pim – who is apologising yet again for the mix-up – Dinah and Brian come in. They are delighted to see Mr Pim again, and are oblivious to the conversation which had just taken place. Olivia sends them to see Mr Pim out. Brian stays behind momentarily to tell Olivia that he is "on her side" about the annulment situation, after which Olivia reveals to him her conversation with Mr Pim. Before he can say anything more, she sends him off when she hears George returning. George enters humming, appearing to have calmed down a bit. He observes the room and its decor, as well as the curtains Olivia is working on, which he had detested at the beginning of the play. To Olivia's surprise, George (who is established to be very old-fashioned) remarks that they should perhaps consider redecorating the room, to brighten it up a bit, and commends Olivia's curtains. It is evident that he wishes to take Olivia to London to be married again from his suggesting that they buy new carpet and furnishings to match the curtains.

Olivia tells George that she told Brian and Dinah that Mr Pim had made a mistake with the name (without telling George that the mistake actually happened) so that Brian and Dinah think that Olivia and George had been truly married the whole time. George, not realizing that the mistake was real, asked Olivia if she was actually considering marrying him again, quietly. Coyly, Olivia tells him yes, which greatly pleases George; he proceeds to shower Olivia with affection and offers to buy her whatever new furnishings she should want in London the following day. They embrace, during which Brian and Dinah re-enter and remark on Mr Pim's big mistake. George, still believing that the "mistake" was a lie, plays along with them, to the enjoyment of Olivia.

George invites Brian to look at the pigs, while Olivia and Dinah converse about Olivia's trip to London with George; Dinah thinks they are going strictly for shopping. Olivia attempts to hang up her curtains, but realises she needs George's help. Dinah calls for him, and he returns with Brian, who happily tells Dinah that George has agreed to their marriage after all. As they share in celebration, George steps back to regard Olivia's new curtains, now seeming to have adopted a new appreciation for them. As the four of them sit in the room, Mr Pim again returns, this time to tell them that he got the first name of the Pelwittle man wrong – though he originally told them it was Henry Pelwittle, his name was actually Ernest Pelwittle.

== Revivals and adaptations ==
=== Revivals ===
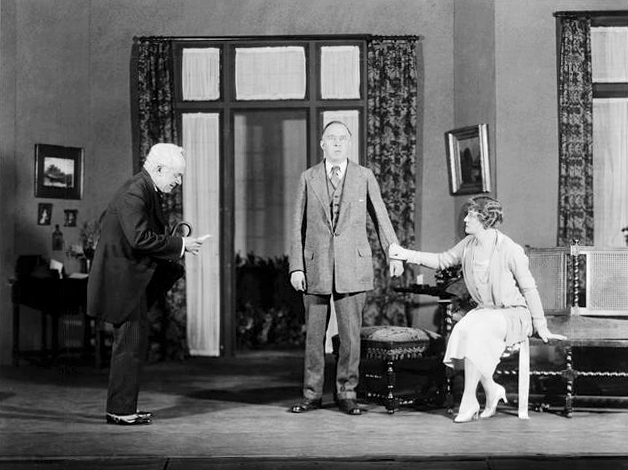
Erskine Sanford, Dudley Digges and Laura Hope Crews in the Theatre Guild's 1921 production of A. A. Milne's Mr Pim Passes By

On Broadway, a production by the Theatre Guild opened on 28 February 1921 at the Garrick Theatre, and ran for 124 performances. Erskine Sanford played Mr Pim, Dudley Digges George and Laura Hope Crews Olivia. The Australian premiere was given in July 1921 by a touring company headed by Marie Tempest and W. Graham Brown as Olivia and George, with Ashton Jarry in the title role.

In London, the play was revived at the Globe Theatre for a limited season in 1922; C. Aubrey Smith replaced Webster as George; Vanbrugh and Boucicault reprised their roles from the premiere. In New York the Theatre Guild revived the play in 1927, with the three main principals from the first Broadway production repeating their roles. The revival ran from April to August, for 72 performances. A 1928 London revival at the St Martin's Theatre starred Tempest and Brown, with Horace Hodges as Mr Pim.

A 1968 revival at the Hampstead Theatre starred Thorley Walters as Mr Pim, Alan Barry as George and Adrienne Corri as Olivia.

=== Adaptations ===
The BBC has broadcast adaptations of the play for radio and television. On radio, Vanbrugh starred in four versions, beginning with a Birmingham Repertory adaptation in 1931, followed by a BBC in-house version in 1934, with Richard Goolden as Mr Pim. Goolden reprised his role in a 1938 adaptation, and appeared with Vanbrugh in her third radio version in 1945. Her final broadcast in the role of Olivia was in 1948, with Norman Shelley as George. A subsequent radio version was transmitted in 1961. The BBC's only television adaptation (1952) was broadcast twice, in live performances, with Arthur Wontner in the title role and Mary Ellis and D. A. Clarke-Smith as Olivia and George.

A silent film adaptation was made in 1921, with Peggy Hyland, Hubert Harben and Campbell Gullan in the lead roles.

== Sources ==
- Milne, A. A. (1921). Mr Pim Passes By: A Comedy in Three Acts. London: Samuel French.
- Wearing, J. P. (2014). The London Stage 1920–1929: A Calendar of Productions, Performers, and Personnel. Lanham, Maryland: Rowman & Littlefield. ISBN 978-0-8108-9302-3.
