= Dion Boucicault Jr. =

American actor (1859–1929)

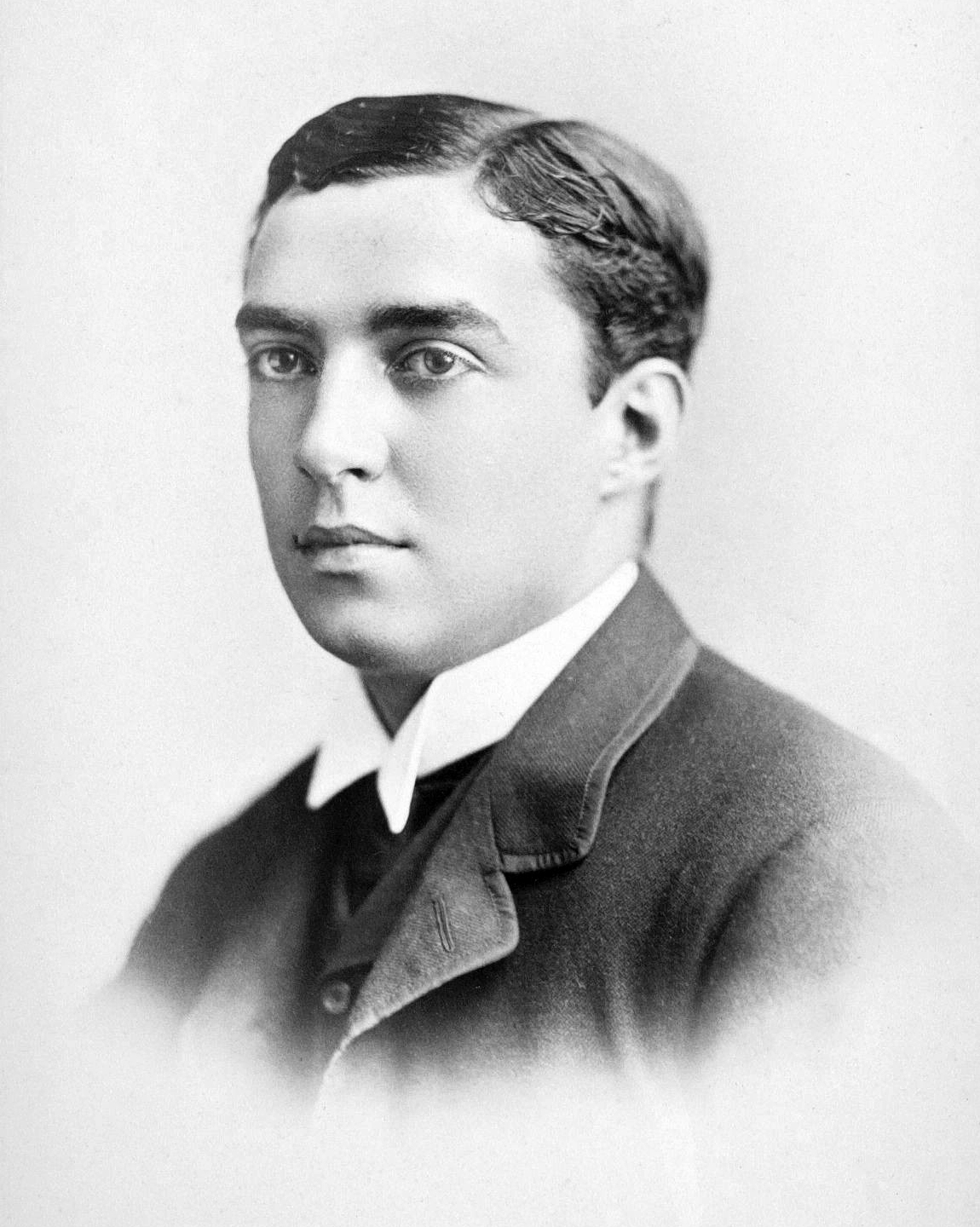
Dion Boucicault Jr.

Dion Boucicault Jr. (born Darley George Boucicault; 23 May 1859 – 25 June 1929) was an actor and stage director. A son of the well-known playwright Dion Boucicault and actress Agnes Robertson, he followed his father into the theatrical profession and made a career as a character actor and a director. In addition to extensive work in the West End of London, he spent considerable time in Australia, where he went into management in the 1880s.

As an actor, his greatest successes included Trelawny of the 'Wells' and Mr. Pim Passes By. His best-known success as a manager was Peter Pan; or, the Boy Who Wouldn't Grow Up, of which he presented the premiere and many revivals. His last big success was Lilac Time in 1922.

== Early life ==
Boucicault was born in New York, the third child of Dion Boucicault, the well-known actor and dramatist, and his wife, Agnes Kelly née Robertson (1833–1916), who was also well known on the stage. He had two elder siblings, Dion William (1855–1876), Eva (1857–1909), and three younger siblings, Patrice (1862-?1890), Nina (1867–1950), the first actress to play Peter Pan, and Aubrey (1868–1913) a handsome and dashing matinee idol. Boucicault was educated at Esher, Cuddington and Paris, and served briefly in the militia. After his elder brother Dion William died in the Abbots Ripton rail accident, Boucicault adopted his name Dion.

== Late life and legacy ==
Boucicault's health began to deteriorate in Australia, and returning to England via New Zealand, he died at his home in Berkshire on 25 June 1929, survived by his wife.
