= Agnes Kelly Robertson =

Scottish actress (1833–1916)

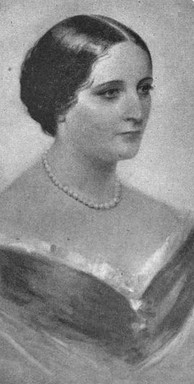
- Born: 25 December 1833; Edinburgh, Scotland
- Died: 6 November 1916 (aged 82)
- Occupations: Actress, stage
- Spouse: Dion Boucicault

Agnes Kelly Robertson (25 December 1833 in Edinburgh – 6 November 1916) was a Scottish actress who became popular on the American stage.

== Early years ==
Robertson was the ward of Charles Kean, and the juvenile lead in his theatre company. There she met the actor and dramatist Dion Boucicault, a collaborator of Kean's. In 1853, she and Boucicault left for America without Kean's permission and married in New York, creating a scandal.

== Career ==
Robertson made her North American debut on 19 September 1853 at Montreal's Theatre Royal as Maria in Boucicault's The Young Actress. She also acted in Jessie Brown; or, The Siege of Lucknow (1858), The Octoroon (1859), and The Colleen Bawn (1860). She was billed as The Pocket Venus. Three photographic portraits of Robertson are held in the National Portrait Gallery in London.

== Family ==
Robertson became Boucicault's second wife in 1853 and divorced him on 21 June 1888 by reason of "bigamy with adultery" after it was discovered that he had married another woman, Louise Thorndyke, bigamously. During the time of their marriage, they had 6 children: Dion William; Eva (or Eve) Boucicault; Darley George ("Dot") Boucicault, later known as Dion Boucicault the Younger (an actor, manager and stage director who married actress Irene Vanbrugh); Patrice Boucicault; Nina Boucicault (an actress); and Aubrey Boucicault (an actor and writer).
