= Boucicaut =

Boucicaut may refer to:

== Persons ==
- Jean I Le Maingre ( -1367), called "Boucicaut", Marshal of France
- Jean II Le Maingre (1366-1421), son of Jean I, also called "Boucicaut", Marshal of France
- Geoffrey Boucicaut, son of Jean I, governor of the Dauphiné from 1399 to 1407
- Boucicaut Master, an anonymous French or Flemish miniaturist and illuminator
- Aristide Boucicaut, creator of the French department store Le Bon Marché
- Alexandre Boucicaut, a Haitian football (soccer) player

== Other uses ==
- Hôpital Boucicaut, a hospital in Paris
- Boucicaut station, a station on Line 8 of the Paris Metro
