= Aubrey Boucicault =

British stage actor and playwright

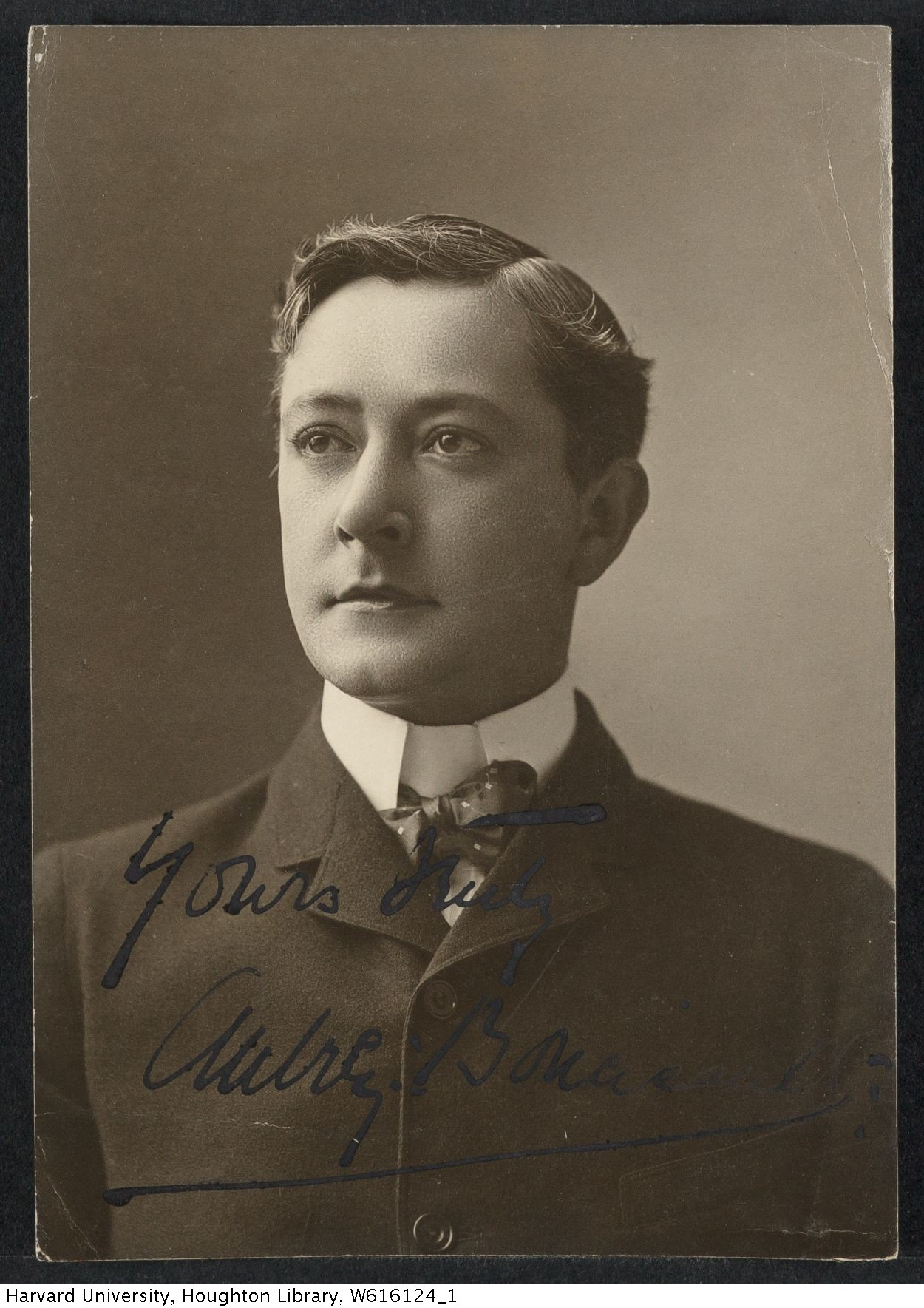
- Born: 23 June 1869; London, England
- Died: 10 July 1913 (aged 44); New York City, United States
- Occupations: Actor, Playwright
- Spouses: Henrietta Isabella Bayne Ranken (circa 1891) (Note: Marriage annulled or possibly not sanctioned as no Certificate was found); Amy Busby (m. 1892, divorced): Cornelia Frances Holbrook (m. circa 1896) 1 child; Ruth Baldwin Holt (m. 1906)
- Children: Rene Boucicault
- Parent(s): Dion Boucicault; Agnes Kelly Robertson

Aubrey Boucicault (23 June 1868 or 1869 – 10 July 1913) was a British-born stage actor, playwright and matinee idol. He came from a famous family of actors and playwrights, his father being Dion Boucicault.

Aubrey Boucicault was born in London to Dion Boucicault and Agnes Robertson and was their sixth and youngest child. Aubrey's older siblings were Dion William (1855-1876), Eva (1857-1909), Dion Jr., Patrice (1862-?1890) and Nina. On August 7, 1887, The New York Times reported that Aubrey and his mother were expected to arrive from England that day to begin their season at St. Paul theatre on August 22 in the show "My Geraldine."

Aubrey's second wife was the actress Amy Busby (1872-1957), but they divorced after only a couple years of marriage. Busby filed divorce papers naming Victory Bateman as a co-respondent presumably in a case of adultery. He was later married to Cornelia Holbrook and then to Ruth Holt. He and Holbrook had a daughter Rene Boucicault.

For the 1903 Elitch Theatre season Boucicault was the leading man for six productions in June and July, playing opposite Jane Kennark or Maude Fealy as the leading lady. His wife, Ruth Baldwin Holt, would play Elitch's in 1908.
