= Nina Boucicault =

English actress (1867–1950)

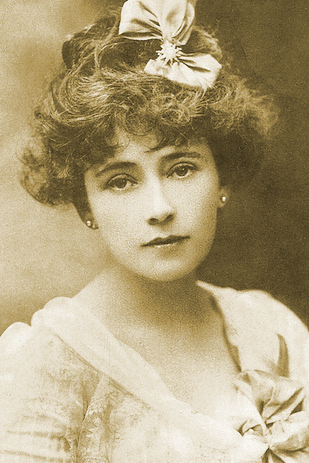
- Born: Nina Boucicault; 27 February 1867; London, England
- Died: 2 August 1950 (aged 83)
- Occupation: Actress
- Parent(s): Dion Boucicault; Agnes Kelly Robertson

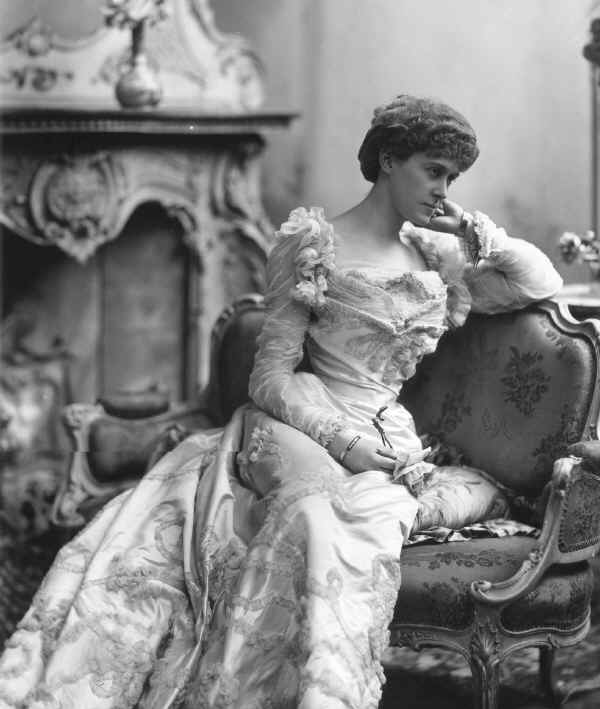
Boucicault in 1899

Nina Boucicault (27 February 1867 – 2 August 1950) was an English-born actress, daughter of the Irish playwright Dion Boucicault, and the actress Agnes Kelly Robertson. She had three brothers, Dion William (1855–1876), Dion Boucicault Jr. and Aubrey Boucicault, and two sisters, Eva and Patrice.

Boucicault's debut was at the Louisville Opera House, and as a child she performed with her father. Beginning in 1892, she played Kitty Verdun in the original production of the hit comedy Charley's Aunt. She was the first to play the title role in J. M. Barrie's Peter Pan, beginning in 1904 at the Duke of York's Theatre.

Boucicault retired from the stage in 1927, returning in 1935 and 1936 in Frolic Wind and Waste, respectively, while continuing her film career. She died at Hamilton Road, Ealing. She was married three times: first to G. D. Pitman; then to E. H. Kelly; and finally to Donald Innes-Smith.

== Selected filmography ==
- Paddy the Next Best Thing (1923)
- Miriam Rozella (1924)
- This Week of Grace (1933)
- Oh, What a Night (1935)
- Juggernaut (1936)
- Strange Boarders (1938)
- Follow Your Star (1938)
