= Dion Boucicault =

Irish actor and dramatist (1820–1890)

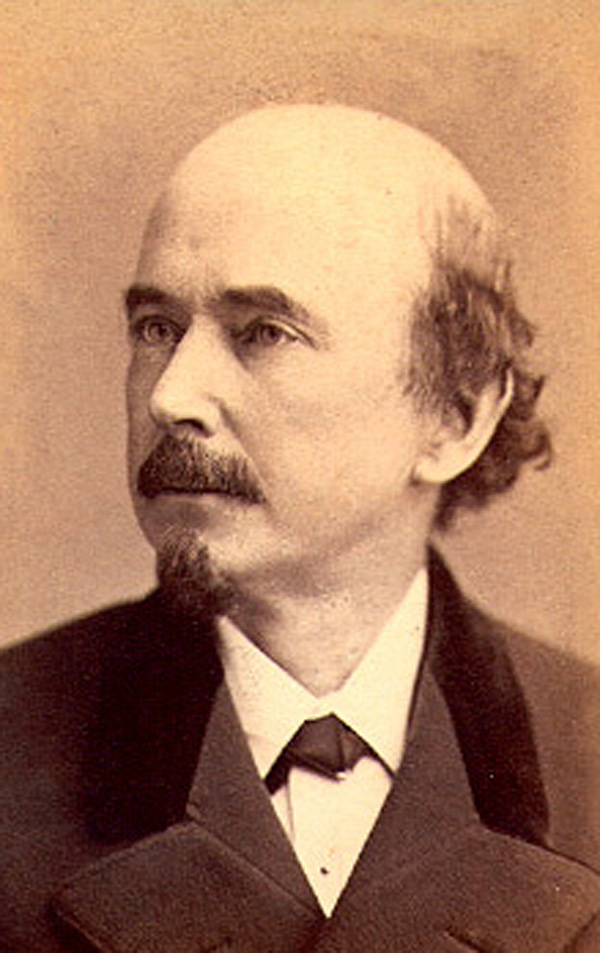
- Dion Boucicault, c. 1862
- Born: Dionysius Lardner Boursiquot; 26 December 1820; Dublin, Ireland
- Died: 18 September 1890 (aged 69); New York City, United States
- Resting place: Mount Hope Cemetery, Hastings-on-Hudson, New York, United States
- Occupations: Playwright, actor
- Spouse(s): Anne Guiot (m.1845–d.1845); Agnes Kelly Robertson (m.1853–d.1916; marriage dissolved 1888); Josephine Louise Thorndyke (m.1885–1890; his death) (bigamously)
- Children: Dion William Boucicault (1855–1876); Eva Boucicault (1857–1909); Dionysius George Boucicault Jr. (1859–1929); Patrice Boucicault (1862–1890); Nina Boucicault (1867–1950); Aubrey Boucicault (1868–1913)
- Relatives: Dionysius Lardner (putative father); Anne Darley (mother); George Darley (uncle)
- Writing career
- Language: English
- Notable works: London Assurance, The Octoroon, The Colleen Bawn, The Shaughraun

Dionysius Lardner "Dion" Boucicault /ˈdaɪˌɒn ˈbuːsɪˌkoʊ/ (né Boursiquot; 26 December 1820 – 18 September 1890) was an Irish actor and playwright famed for his melodramas. By the later part of the 19th century, Boucicault had become known on both sides of the Atlantic as one of the most successful actor-playwright-managers then in the English-speaking theatre. The New York Times hailed him in his obituary as "the most conspicuous English dramatist of the 19th century"; he and his second wife, Agnes Robertson Boucicault, applied for, and received, American citizenship in 1873.

== Life and career ==
=== Early life ===
Boucicault was born Dionysius Lardner Boursiquot in 1820 Dublin, where his family lived on Gardiner Street. His mother was Anne Maria Laura Beresford, sister of the poet and mathematician George Darley. The Darleys were an important Anglo-Irish Dublin family influential in many fields and related to the Guinnesses by marriage. Anne was married to Samuel Smith Boursiquot, of Huguenot ancestry, but the identity of Dion's father is uncertain. He was probably Dionysius Lardner, who was a lodger at Anne Boursiquot's house at a time when she had recently separated from her husband. Lardner later gave Dion Boucicault financial support until about 1840.

In 1828, Lardner was elected as professor of natural philosophy and astronomy at University College London ('London University' at the time), a position he held until he resigned in 1831. Anne Boursiquot followed him to London in 1828, taking all but one of her children with her.

Consequently, Dion Boucicault attended various schools in and around London; there is confusion about the details of his education. Richard Fawkes has addressed this in a biography. For about four years, from 1829, Boucicault seems to have attended a very small private school in Hampstead kept by a Mr Hessey; between 1833 and 1835 he was at University College School, where he began his friendship with Charles Kenney. He later recalled having boarded in Euston Square with a Rev. Henry Stebbing, a historian. There is a gap of two years in the record, when Fawkes believes Boucicault may have attended Rowland Hill's Bruce Castle School, as stated in the Dictionary of National Biography.

In 1837, he was enrolled at Wyke House, a school at Sion Hill, Brentford, kept by a Dr Alexander Jamieson. There he appeared in a school play, in the part of Rolla in Sheridan's Pizarro. He also wrote his own first play, The Old Guard, which was produced some years later.

When Boucicault was in his late teens, his mother persuaded a cousin, Arthur Lee Guinness (second son of Arthur Guinness (the Second)), to give her son a job as a clerk in the Dublin brewery. He began an affair with Guinness, which caused a crisis in his cousin's family. In 1840 Boucicault returned to London flush with cash, thought to be the result of blackmail or the family having paid him off. He enrolled as a student at the Dean Street Academy. He later claimed Guinness paid for his tuition and had made him his heir. The allowance was stopped and Boucicault became penniless.

=== Work as actor and playwright ===
Boucicault took up an acting offer in Cheltenham, adopting the stage name of Lee Morton. He joined William Charles Macready and made his first appearance on stage with Benjamin Webster at Bristol. Soon after this he began to write plays, occasionally in conjunction with his acting.

Boucicault's first play, A Legend of the Devil's Dyke, opened in Brighton in 1838. Three years later, he had a big success as a dramatist with London Assurance. First produced at Covent Garden on 4 March 1841, its cast included such well-known actors as Charles Mathews, William Farren, Mrs Nesbitt and Madame Vestris.

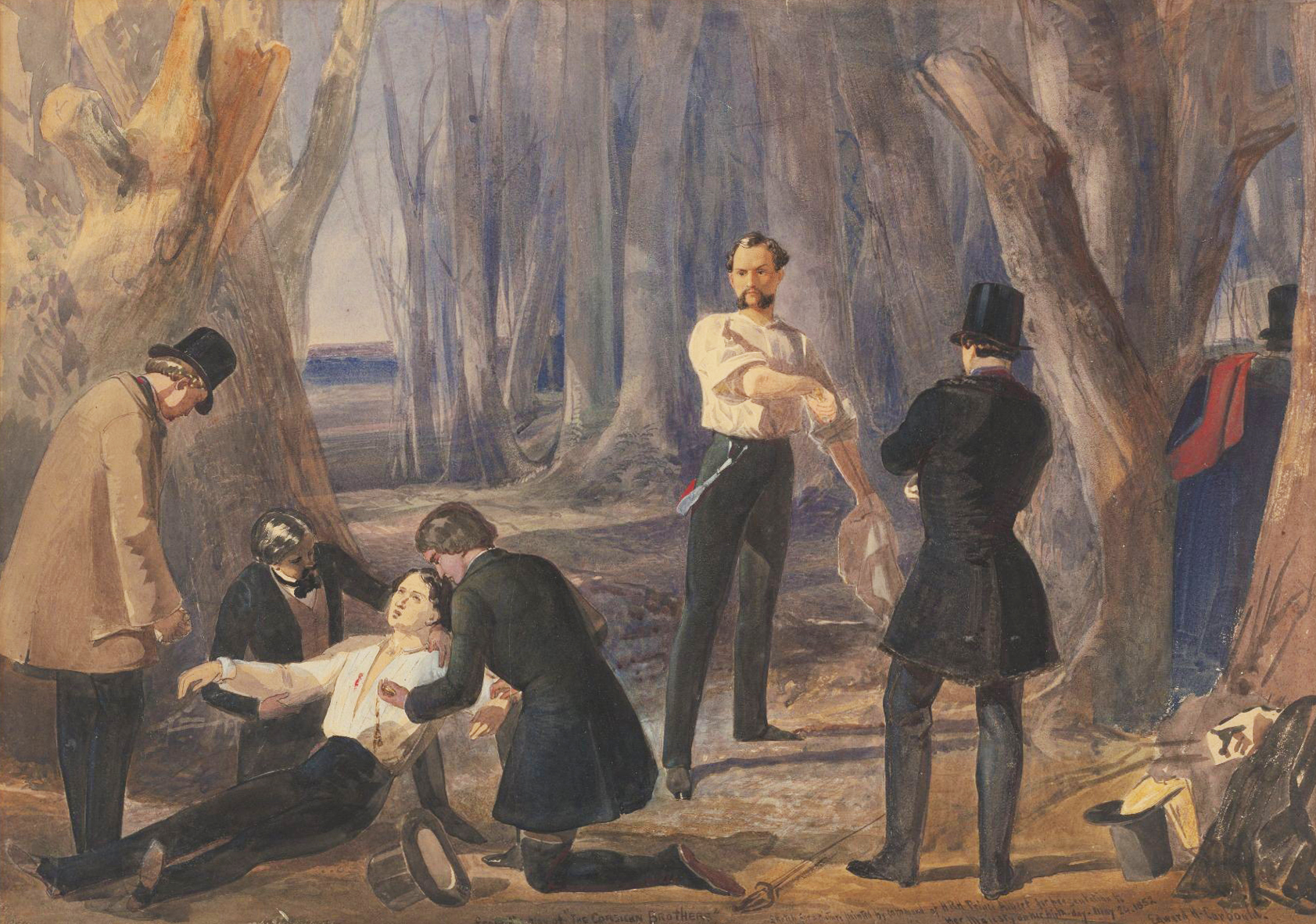
Painting by Edward Henry Corbould depicting a scene from Boucicault's The Corsican Brothers, 1852

Boucicault rapidly followed this with a number of other plays, among the most successful being The Bastile [sic], an "after-piece" (1842), Old Heads and Young Hearts (1844), The School for Scheming (1847), Confidence (1848), and The Knight Arva (1848), all produced at Her Majesty's Theatre. He had further great successes with The Corsican Brothers (1852, for Charles Kean) and Louis XI (1855), both adaptations of French plays.

In his The Vampire (1852), Boucicault made his début as a leading actor, appearing as the vampire Sir Alan Raby. Although the play received mixed reviews, Boucicault's characterisation was praised as "a dreadful and weird thing played with immortal genius". In 1854 he wrote Andy Blake; or, The Irish Diamond and also played the title character.

From 1854 to 1860, Boucicault resided in the United States, where he was always a popular favourite. Boucicault and his actress wife, Agnes Robertson, toured America. He also wrote many successful plays there, acting in most of them. These included the popular Jessie Brown; or, The Relief of Lucknow in 1858.

=== Work as theatre manager and producer ===
From around 1855 his business manager and partner in New York was William Stuart, an expatriate Irish MP and adventurer. Together they leased Wallack's Theatre in 1855–1856, and put on a short season at the Washington Theatre in Washington D.C.

In late 1855, while his wife was performing in St. Louis, Boucicault leased the Varieties Theatre in New Orleans. He quickly renamed it the Gaity and was set to open its doors on 28 November. A short delay pushed the opening night back to 1 December with his play Used Up. During his stay in New Orleans, a false report of his death began to circulate. This rumor was proven false when days later on 20 December he presented The Chameleon at the Gaiety. This was the first appearance of Agnes Robertson at the Gaiety. Shortly after, on 26 February of 1856 Boucicualt was in the market to sell his lease. By 8 March he was out and heading to New York.

In the summer of 1859, Boucicault and William Stuart jointly leased Burton's New Theatre (originally Tripler's Theatre) on Broadway just below Amity Street. After extensive remodeling, he renamed his new showplace the Winter Garden Theatre. There on 5 December 1859, he premiered his new sensation, the anti-slavery potboiler The Octoroon, in which he also starred. This is considered the first play to explore the lives of the Black American population, the majority of whom were still enslaved.

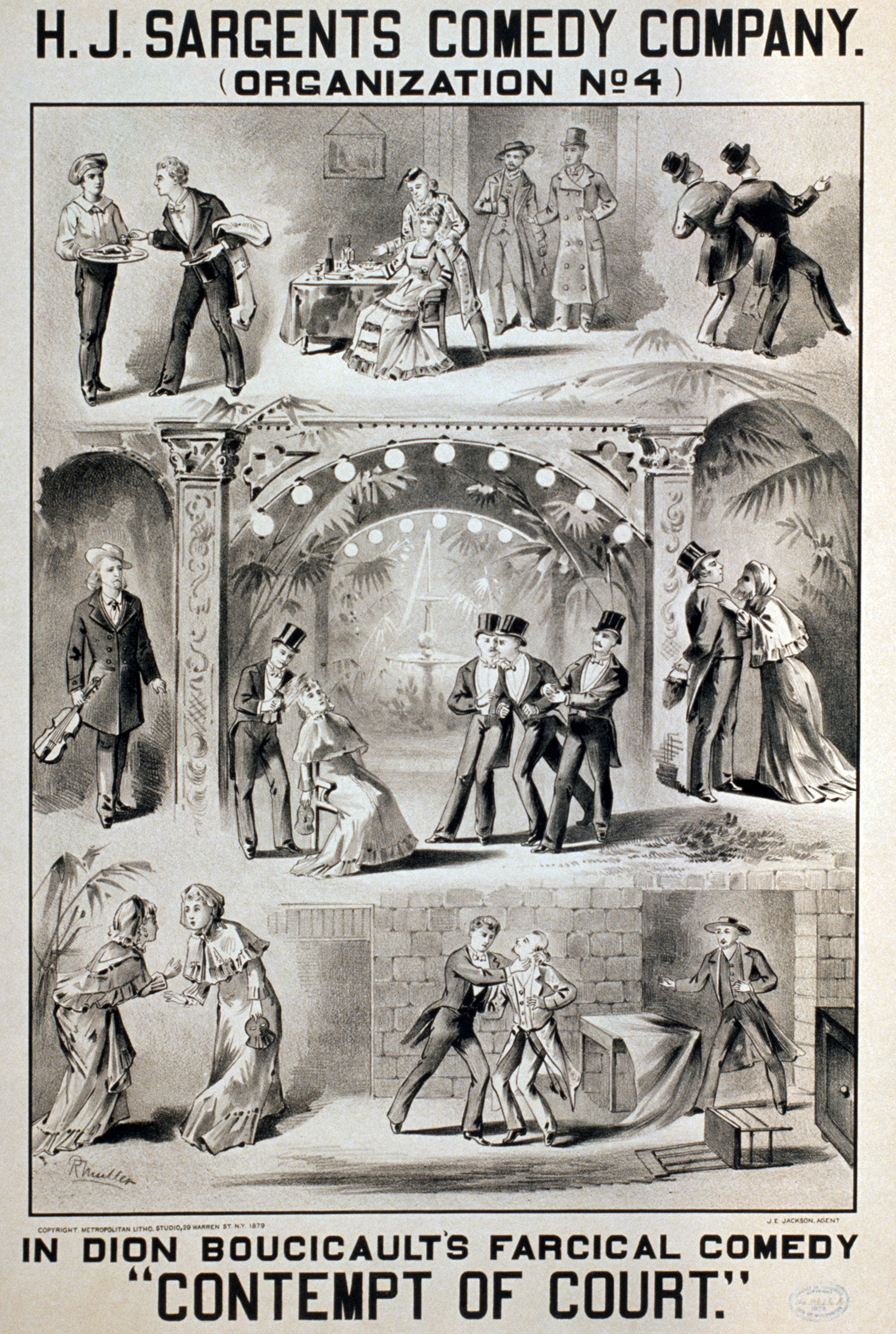
Poster for a production of Boucicault's farce Contempt of Court, c. 1879. From the Library of Congress

Boucicault fell out with Stuart over money matters, and he returned to England. There he produced at the Adelphi Theatre a dramatic adaptation of a Gerald Griffin novel, The Collegians, entitled The Colleen Bawn. This play, one of the most successful of the times, was performed in almost every city of the United Kingdom and the United States. Julius Benedict used it as the basis for his opera The Lily of Killarney. Although the play earned a handsome fortune for Boucicault, he lost it while managing various London theatres.

After returning to England, Boucicault was asked by noted American comedian Joseph Jefferson, who also starred in the production of Octoroon, to rework Jefferson's adaptation of Washington Irving's Rip van Winkle. Their play opened in London in 1865 and on Broadway in 1866.

Boucicault's next marked success was at the Princess's Theatre, London in 1864 with Arrah-na-Pogue in which he played the part of a County Wicklow, Ireland carman. This, and his admirable creation of "Conn" in his play The Shaughraun (first produced at Wallacks Theatre, New York City, in 1874, then at the Theatre Royal, Drury Lane in 1875), won him the reputation of being the best "Stage Irishman" of his time. W. S. Gilbert referred to the notable actor in the libretto of his 1881 operetta Patience in the line: "The pathos of Paddy, as rendered by Boucicault".

Again in partnership with William Stuart, he built the New Park Theatre in 1873–1874. However, Boucicault withdrew from the business just before the theatre opened. Stuart teamed up instead with the actor, playwright and theatre manager Charles Fechter to run the house.

In 1875 Boucicault returned to New York City, where he made his home; for a time his manager was Harry J. Sargent. In the same year, his adaptation of Samuel Richardson's 1748 novel Clarissa premiered at Wallack's Theatre. He wrote the melodrama Contempt of Court (poster, left) in 1879, but he paid occasional visits to London and elsewhere (e.g. Toronto). He made his last appearance in London in his play, The Jilt, in 1885.

Boucicault was an excellent actor, especially in pathetic parts. His uncanny ability to play these low-status roles earned him the nickname "Little Man Dion" in theatrical circles. His plays are for the most part adaptations, but are often very ingenious in construction. They have had great popularity.

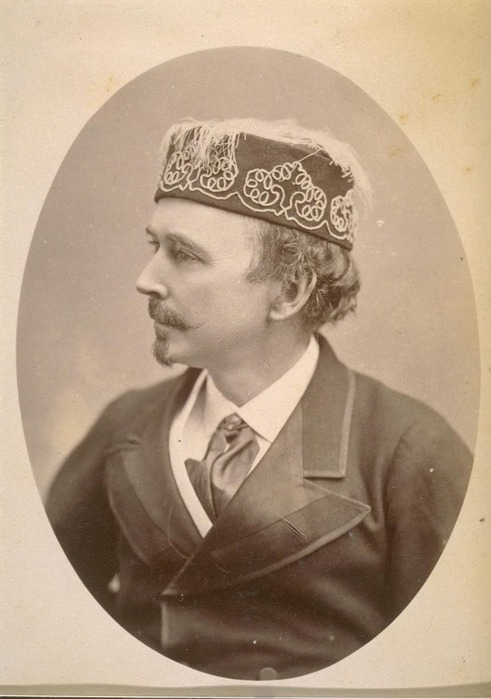
Dion Boucicault (date unknown)

=== Family life ===
Boucicault was married three times. He married the much older Anne Guiot at St Mary-at-Lambeth on 9 July 1845. He claimed that she died in a Swiss mountaineering accident later in the same year, though she may in fact have died as late as 1848. In 1853, he eloped with Agnes Kelly Robertson (1833–1916) to marry in New York. She was Charles Kean's ward; the juvenile lead in his company and an actress of unusual ability. She would bear Dion six children: Dion William Boucicault (1855–1876); Eva Boucicault (1857–1909); Dion Jr. (1859–1929); Patrice Boucicault (1862–1890); Nina Boucicault (1867–1950); Aubrey (1868–1913); three of whom became distinguished actors in their own right. Patrice became a society singer, marrying George Pitman in 1885 but died in childbirth in 1890. His granddaughter Rene Boucicault (1898–1935), Aubrey's daughter, became an actress and acted in silent films. His eldest son Dion William was killed in the Abbots Ripton rail accident on the East Coast Main Line in England on 21 January 1876.

Between 11 July and 8 October 1885, Boucicault toured Australia, where his brother Arthur lived. Towards the end of this tour, he suddenly left Agnes to marry Josephine Louise Thorndyke (c. 1864–1956), a young actress, on 9 September 1885, in Sydney. This aroused scandal on both sides of the Atlantic Ocean, as his marriage to Agnes was not finally dissolved until 21 June 1888, by reason of "bigamy with adultery". The rights to many of his plays were later sold to finance alimony payments to his second wife.

His last play, A Tale of a Coat, opened at Daly's Theatre in New York on 14 August 1890, and closed on 13 September 1890.

Boucicault died in 1890 in New York City, and was buried in Mount Hope Cemetery, Hastings, Westchester County, New York.

== Selected works ==
- London Assurance (1841)
- The Bastile [sic] (1842)
- Old Heads and Young Hearts (1844)
- The School for Scheming (1847)
- Confidence (1848)
- The Knight Arva (1848)
- The Corsican Brothers (1852)
- The Vampire (1852)
- Louis XI (1855)
- The Phantom (1856)
- The Poor of New York (1857)
- The Octoroon or Life in Louisiana (1859)
- The Colleen Bawn or The Brides of Garryowen (1860) (Digital version)
- Jeanie Deans (1860)
- Arrah-na-Pogue (1864)
- The Streets of London (1864)
- Rip van Winkle or The Sleep of Twenty Years (1865)
- After Dark: A Tale of London Life (1868)
- Formosa, The Most Beautiful or The Railroad to Ruin (1869)
- The Shaughraun (1874) (Digital version)
- Foul Play: A Novel by Charles Reade, Dion Boucicault (1875) (Digital version)
- The Jilt (1885)
- Forbidden Fruit And Other Plays (1940) (Digital version)
- Selected plays of Dion Boucicault (1987) (Digital version)

== See also ==
- See a man about a dog
