= Amy Busby =

American actress

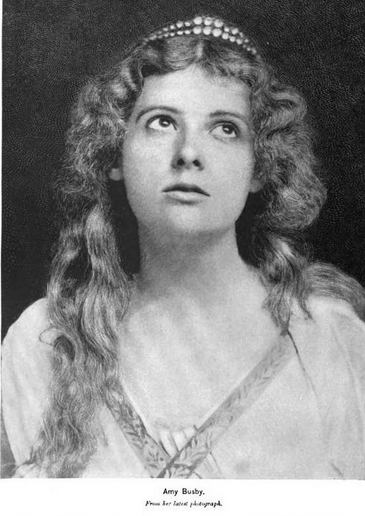
- Born: Amy Busby; January 19, 1872; Rochester, New York, U.S.
- Died: July 13, 1957 (aged 85); East Stroudsburg, Pennsylvania, U.S.
- Occupation: Actress
- Spouses: Aubrey Boucicault (m. 1892; div. 1893) Eugene Howard Lewis (m. 1897; died 1907) Theodore Olynthna Douglas (m. 1908; died 1920) John James Roy (m. 1923; sep. 1938)
- Children: 5

Amy Busby (January 19, 1872 – July 13, 1957) was an American actress.

== Early life ==
Amy Busby was born in Rochester, New York, the daughter of Thomas Mark Busby and Eliza Ann Bennett Busby.

== Career ==
Amy Busby went to New York City as a teenager, hoping for a career on the stage. Described as "a vastly pretty woman", she was a protegee of actress Helen Barry for a time, and later was engaged by Stuart Robson and William H. Crane for their companies. She appeared in London Assurance, Victor Durand, The Pembertons, The Henrietta, She Stoops to Conquer, Is Marriage a Failure? The American Minister, On Probation, Brother John, For Money, The Senator, and Arms and the Man. Busby's Broadway credits included The Fatal Card (1894), Madame (1896), The Law of the Land (1896), and Secret Service (1896).

Theatrical producer William Berkeley Enos took the professional name "Busby Berkeley" from Amy Busby, who was his parents' friend. Sam Insull met his wife, actress Gladys Wallis, at an 1897 dinner party hosted by Amy Busby and Eugene H. Lewis.

In the late 1880s, Between The Acts cigarettes ran an advertising campaign featuring actors and actresses on coloured lithograph collectors cards. Amy Busby was featured on one in a series issued from 1880 - 1892.

== Personal life ==
Amy Busby was rumoured to be engaged to actor William Gillette, but they did not wed. She married several times. In 1892 she married English actor Aubrey Boucicault; they divorced in 1893. Her next marriage was to lawyer Eugene Howard Lewis, in 1897; they had three daughters (Amy, Rosamund, and Eugenia) before his death in 1907. She married again in 1908, to mining engineer Theodore Olynthna Douglas; they had two daughters (Theodora and Ruth) before he died in 1920. She was married a final time in 1923, to a man named John James Roy; they separated by 1938. Late in life, she enjoyed baseball as a fan of the Brooklyn Dodgers. Amy Busby died in 1957, aged 85 years, in East Stroudsburg, Pennsylvania.
