= J. Harry Benrimo =

American actor, director, and dramatist (1874–1942)

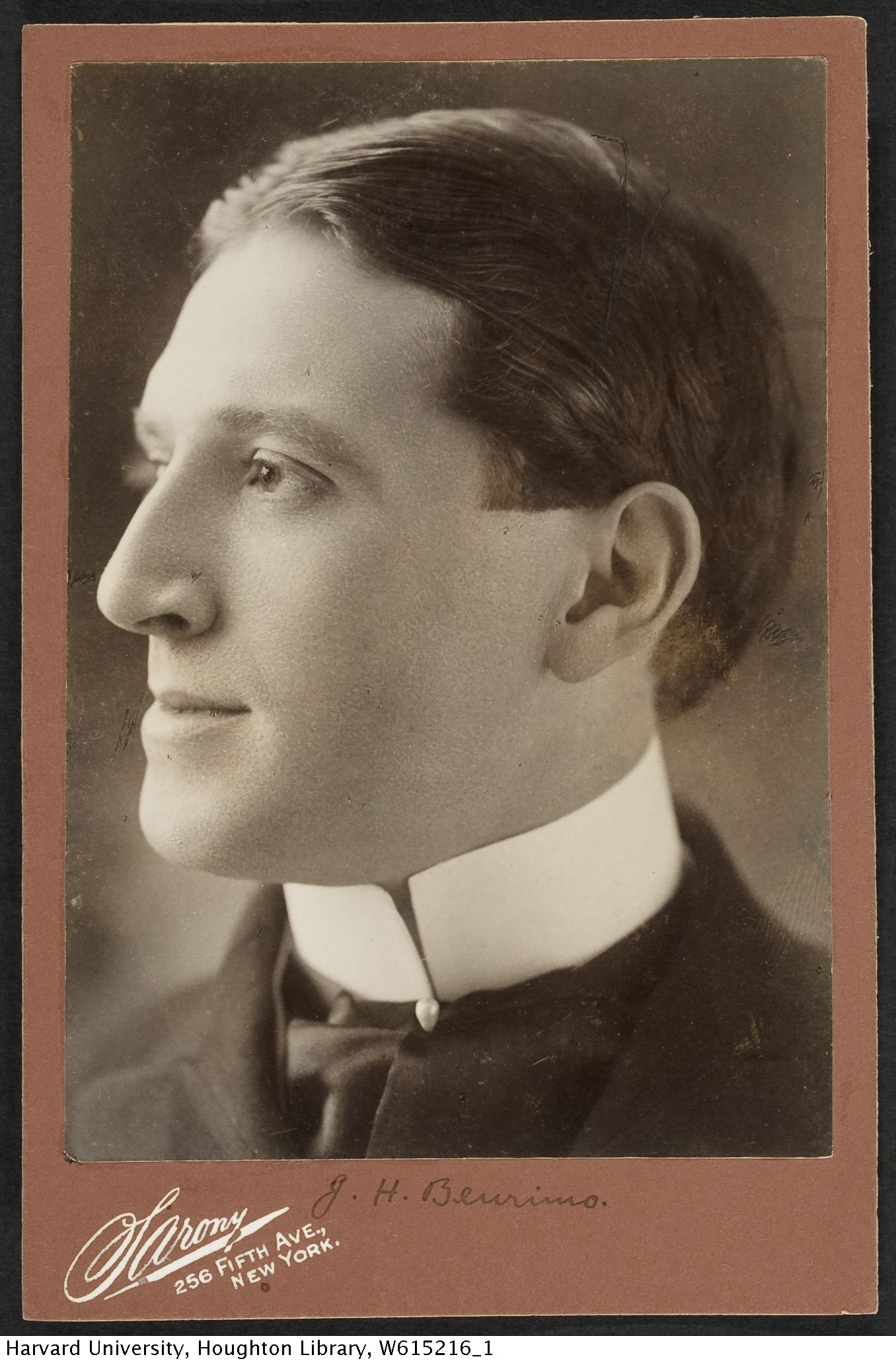
- Born: Joseph Henry McAlpin Benrimo; June 21, 1870; San Francisco, California, U.S.
- Died: March 26, 1942 (aged 71); New York City, U.S.
- Occupations: Actor; Playwright; Theatre director

Joseph Henry McAlpin Benrimo, often referred to as just Benrimo or as J. Harry Benrimo, (June 21, 1870 – March 26, 1942) was an American actor, playwright, director, Williams College scholar and professor of music. W. Anthony Sheppard stated that Benrimo was a "central and versatile figure in Orientalist theater." With George Cochrane Hazelton he co-authored the landmark orientalist drama The Yellow Jacket (1912), and with Harrison Rhodes he co-authored the play The Willow Tree (1917), based on a Japanese legend. The latter drama was made into a novel in 1918, a film in 1920, and the operetta Cherry Blossoms (1927).

Benrimo began his career as a stage actor in California in 1892, working predominantly in San Francisco over the next five years in repertory theatre. In 1897 he created the Chinese character of Hop-Kee in the world premiere of Francis Powers's The First Born. David Belasco brought Benrimo to Broadway that same year in The First Born. He remained a prolific actor on Broadway through 1912. While he played a variety of roles, he found particular success portraying a Japanese character in Belasco's The Darling of the Gods (1902–1904) and a Native American character in The Girl of the Golden West (1905–1908).

Benrimo was active as a director on Broadway from 1914 to 1931. He directed The Blue Paradise in its original production at the Casino Theatre beginning in August 1915. He also staged the comic operetta The Well of Romance in 1930.

== Early life and career ==
The son of Joseph and Edith Benrimo, Joseph Henry Benrimo was born in San Francisco on June 21, 1870. In June 1891 he performed in an amateur production of Dion Boucicault's The Long Strike in his native city. The following November he portrayed the lead role of Captain Bradey in Augustus Thomas's A Woman of the World at Odd Fellows Hall, San Francisco. In February and May 1892 he was performing professionally with a stock theatre company in residence at the Clunie Opera House in Sacramento in an afterpiece called Lend Me a Dollar; the Doctor in the play version of Little Lord Fauntleroy; Mr. Guppy in a stage version of Bleak House; and Bummer Smith in Clay M. Greene's M'Liss.

In April 1892 Benrimo was engaged in a theatre company operated by Joseph R. Grismer and his wife Phoebe Davies which was in residence at the Alcazar Theatre in San Francisco. With this troupe he performed the part of the Chef in A. M. Palmer's The Merchant. He remained active as an actor in theaters in California (predominantly San Francisco) over the next five years. He also performed in plays in Sacramento. He was active not only with repertory theatre at the Alcazar but also with a troupe associated with Oliver Morosco's theatre in San Francisco.

Some of the roles Benrimo performed in California included Dr. Lanyon in Thomas Russell Sullivan's Dr. Jekyll and Mr. Hyde (1892), Oysterpuff in Adolphe d'Ennery's stage version of Around the World in Eighty Days (1892), the Old Boatswain in The French Spy (1894), the Old Boatswain in Tripoli (1894), Bludge Jennings in Clay M. Greene's The Red Spider (1894), Mons Alphonse in D. K. Higgins's The Vendetta (1894), Terry the Tough in Oliver North's Dangers of a Great City (1894), Stoneman in By the World Forgotten (1894), Captain Ratts in The Octoroon (1894), Roderick Brown in The Player (1894, an adaptation of David Garrick by Lawrence Hanley), Polonius in Hamlet (1894), Captain Carr in Ben Teal's The Great Metropolis (1894), Sandy Mitchell in Uncle Dan'l, or, A Messenger from Jarvis Section (1894), Peter Crank in a stage version of Florence Marryat's Woman Against Woman (1894), Ralph Errol in Mr. Potter of Texas, (1895) Lanty McKiven in Edgar Selden's Will O' the Wisp (1895), the butler Perkins in Lucy Hooper's Inherited (1895), Jim Bargiss in Arthur Shirley's The Lightning's Flash (1895), George Harris in Uncle Tom's Cabin (1896), and Thomas Kerwin in Augustus Thomas's New Blood (1897).

== The First Born and other work as an actor on Broadway ==
In May 1897 Benrimo created the role of Hop-Kee in the world premiere of Francis Powers's The First Born at San Francisco's Alcazar Theatre. This part began his association with orientalist theatre. Theatrical producer and director David Belasco saw the play and decided to bring the work to Broadway with Benrimo remaining in his part. He performed the role for his debut on Broadway on October 5, 1897, at the Manhattan Theatre. He subsequently performed this part at the Globe Theatre in London.

Benrimo remained active as an actor on the New York stage through 1912. He found success on Broadway portraying the Japanese characters Bento and Kato in Belasco's The Darling of the Gods (1902–1904, Belasco Theatre), and the Native American character of Billy Jackrabbit in The Girl of the Golden West (1905–1906 and again in 1907–1908, Belasco Theatre). His other Broadway credits included The Conquerors (1898, Empire Theatre, as Major von Wolfshagen); Lord and Lady Algy (1899, Empire Theatre, as the Honorable Crosby Jethro); My Lady's Lord (1899–1900, Empire Theatre, as Archduke of Vasungia), In the Palace of the King (1900, Theatre Republic, as Captain de Mendoza), L'Aiglon (1900, Knickerbocker Theatre, as Marshal Marmont), The Hunchback (1902, Garrick Theatre, as Lord Tinsel), Adrea (1905, Belasco Theatre, as Mimus the Echo), The Rose of the Rancho (1906–1907, Belasco Theatre, as Sunol, the Muleteer), An Englishman's Home (1909, Criterion Theatre, as Prince Yoland), The Heights (1910, Savoy Theatre, as Pietro Pacello), Beethoven (1910, New Theatre, as Anton Schindler), Keeping Up Appearances (1910, Collier's Comedy Theatre, as Frederick Lowell), and Maggie Pepper (1911–1912, Harris Theatre, as James Durkin).

== Playwright and director ==
In 1912 Benrimo mostly gave up acting and re-oriented his path towards a career as a stage director and playwright. He co-authored the play The Yellow Jacket with George Cochrane Hazelton, a work which the two compiled through their own ethnographic research in which they attended many performances of Chinese opera in theaters in Chinatown, San Francisco. The pair began working on the play in the summer of 1910 with the intention of taking what they had learned about Chinese opera and translating it into the format of a romantic comedy in order to appeal to white audiences. It premiered at the Fulton Theatre on November 4, 1912, with Benrimo also directing the production, and ran on Broadway for 80 performances.

The Yellow Jacket was enormously popular and was performed widely. It is considered a landmark orientalist drama in the Western canon because of its use of authentic source material and its incorporation of elements found in classic Chinese drama. While Benrimo and Hazelton did not credit any single source as the basis of The Yellow Jacket, Ashley Thorpe, a scholar of Asian theatre and dance at the scholar University of London, stated that the play's plot is very similar to Ji Junxiang's The Orphan of Zhao. In 1913 the play was staged at the Duke of York's Theatre in London's West End. It was subsequently revived on Broadway in 1916 and 1928, and in London at the Kingsway Theatre in 1922. In this latter production Benrimo made a rare return to the stage in the part of The Property Man.

Benrimo's only other significant play staged in New York was The Willow Tree which he co-wrote with Harrison Rhodes. It was mounted at the Cohan and Harris Theatre in 1917. It was a popular hit during a period of Japonisme in vogue within the American theatre of the early 20th century. It was later adapted into the 1920 film The Willow Tree by screenwriter June Mathis and director Henry Otto. The 1927 Broadway musical Cherry Blossoms was also adapted from the play. He also co-translated a foreign language play with Agnes Morgan entitled Taking Chances which was staged at the 39th Street Theatre in 1915. The original play was authored in the German language by Siegfried Geyer and Paul Frank.

As a director Benrimo often directed his own plays, or worked in that capacity for the Shubert family of producers. His Broadway credits as a director included Lady Luxury (1914), The Peasant Girl (1915), Nobody Home (1915), Hands Up (1915), The Blue Paradise (1915), Alone at Last (1915), Ruggles of Red Gap (1915), See America First (1916), The Girl from Brazil (1916), Follow Me (1916), Love O' Mike (1917), Good Night, Paul (1917), Creoles (1927), The Well of Romance (1930), and Right of Happiness (1931).

== Personal life and death ==
Benrimo married Fayette "Fay" Lewis on February 5, 1899. Their marriage ended in divorce in 1902. He later married Helen Edith Robertson in Westminster, London, in 1906. Helen Robertson was an actress, and she filed for divorce from Benrimo in Chicago in 1912. In 1913 he married the actress Katharine Kaelred. During World War I he served in the Military Intelligence Corps of the United States Army.

Benrimo died at Midtown Hospital in New York City on March 26, 1942. His funeral service was held at the Little Church Around the Corner and was officiated by Reverend Randolph Ray. Composer Harry Rowe Shelley and organist Franklin Coates performed music at the ceremony, which included not only hymns but also music from The Yellow Jacket. Pallbearers at the funeral included actors Howard Kyle, Rex O'Malley, Percy Moore, Robert Pitkin, and Hap Ward; play agent John W. Rumsey; the stage designer and theatrical producer Austin Strong; the theatrical designer Mitchell Cirker; the artist Stanislav Rembski; the theatre critic and scholar Barrett H. Clarke; playwright Thomas Grant Springer; screenwriter Hans Neumann; and photographer Arnold Genthe.
