= Eileen Huban =

Irish-born American actress (died 1935)

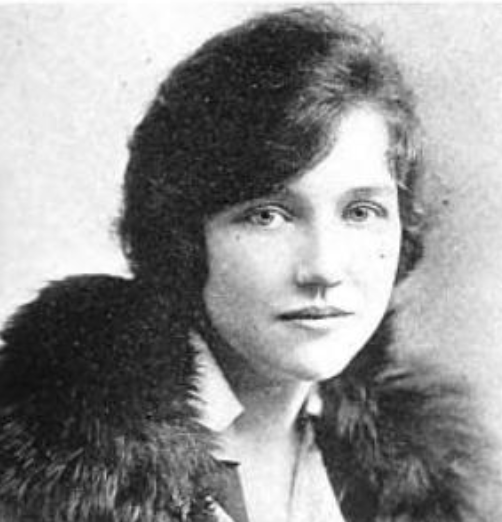
- Eileen Huban, from a 1917 publication
- Born: 1896 or 1897; Gort, Loughrea, Ireland
- Died: October 22, 1935 (aged 38); New York City, New York, U.S.
- Occupation: Actress

Eileen Huban (1896 or 1897 – October 22, 1935) was an American actress, active in New York City in the 1910s and 1920s.

== Early life and education ==
Huban was born in Gort, Loughrea, Ireland. She was the youngest of nine children of Michael Huban and Winifred Mullins Huban. She attended a convent school, and moved to the United States to be with her widowed mother and sisters by 1913.

== Career ==
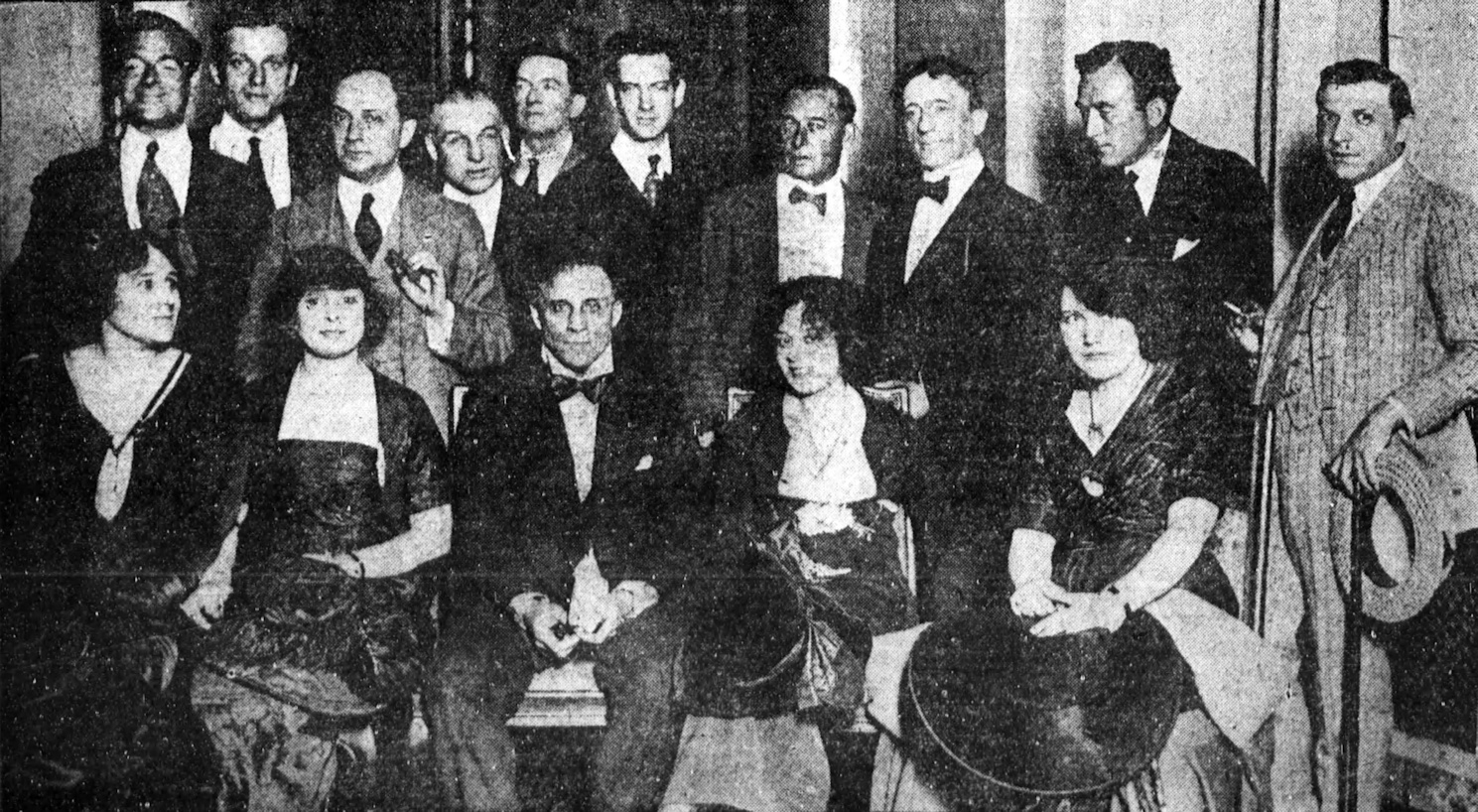
Newly elected officers and directors of the Actors' Fidelity League on August 26, 1919; seated: Gladys Hanson, Marjorie Wood, Louis Mann (vice president), Lenore Ulric, Eileen Huban. Standing: Lowell Sherman, Arthur Ashley, W. H. Gilmore, Frederic Carr, Lester Lonergan, Alan Dinehart (secretary), William Collier Sr. (treasurer), Howard Kyle, Tom Holliday, and José Ruben.

Huban's first public performance was as a singer in the 1913 Irish Historic Pageant at the Lexington Avenue Armory in New York City. Her New York stage credits included roles in the shows Lonesome-like (1915), The Grasshopper (1917), Old Friends (1917), On With the Dance (1917), Cheating Cheaters (1918), Crops and Croppers (1918), Dark Rosaleen (1919), Paddy the Next Best Thing (1920), Hindle Wakes (1922), King Henry IV, Part I (1926), Window Panes (1927), Mixed Marriage (1930), and Troilus and Cressida (1932). She was also seen in the silent film Find the Woman (1922).

"She is lovely to behold, a person naturally eloquent and dramatic," wrote a New York Times reviewer in 1917. "She plays with a grateful simplicity and directness, and she has a certain eeriness that is fascinating." "Her voice is a fine mezzo-soprano with unusual range and power," noted the Baltimore Sun in 1919, while also remarking on her "large dark-blue eyes" and "dark brown curls".

Huban served several three-year terms on the board of directors of the Actors' Fidelity League.

== Personal life ==
Huban died in 1935, after six months of illness, at the age of 38, in New York City.

Her grand-niece is the actress Susan Sullivan.
