= The Redemption of David Corson =

1914 film

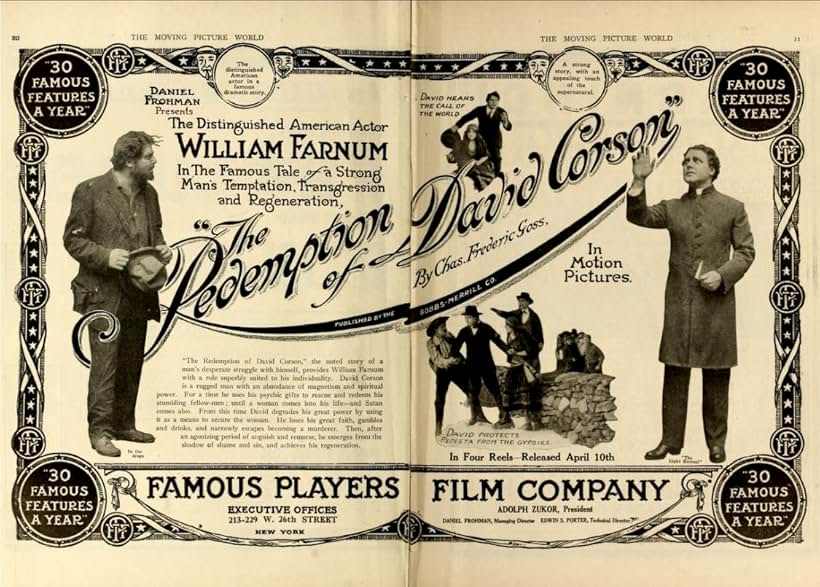
- Directed by: Frederick A. Thomson
- Written by: Frederick A. Thomson (scenario)
- Based on: the novel The Redemption of David Corson by Charles Frederic Goss c.1900
- Produced by: Daniel Frohman; Adolph Zukor
- Starring: William Farnum
- Distributed by: State Rights
- Release date: April 10, 1914
- Running time: 4 reels
- Country: United States
- Language: Silent..English titles

The Redemption of David Corson is a lost 1914 silent film drama directed by Frederick A. Thomson and starring William Farnum. It was produced by Daniel Frohman and Adolph Zukor.

This story was based on a novel The Redemption of David Corson by Charles Frederic Goss. In 1906 Lottie Blair Parker, of Way Down East fame, wrote a Broadway play version.

== Cast ==
- William Farnum - David Corson
- Robert Broderick - Dr. Parcelsus
- Constance Mollineaux - Pepeeta, the gypsy girl
- Hal Clarendon - Andy MacFarlane
- Helen Aubrey - David's Mother
- William Cowper - Elder Sprague
- Leonard Grover - Justice of the Peace
- William Vaughn - The Gypsy Chief (*see Wilhelm von Brincken)
