= The Conquerors (play) =

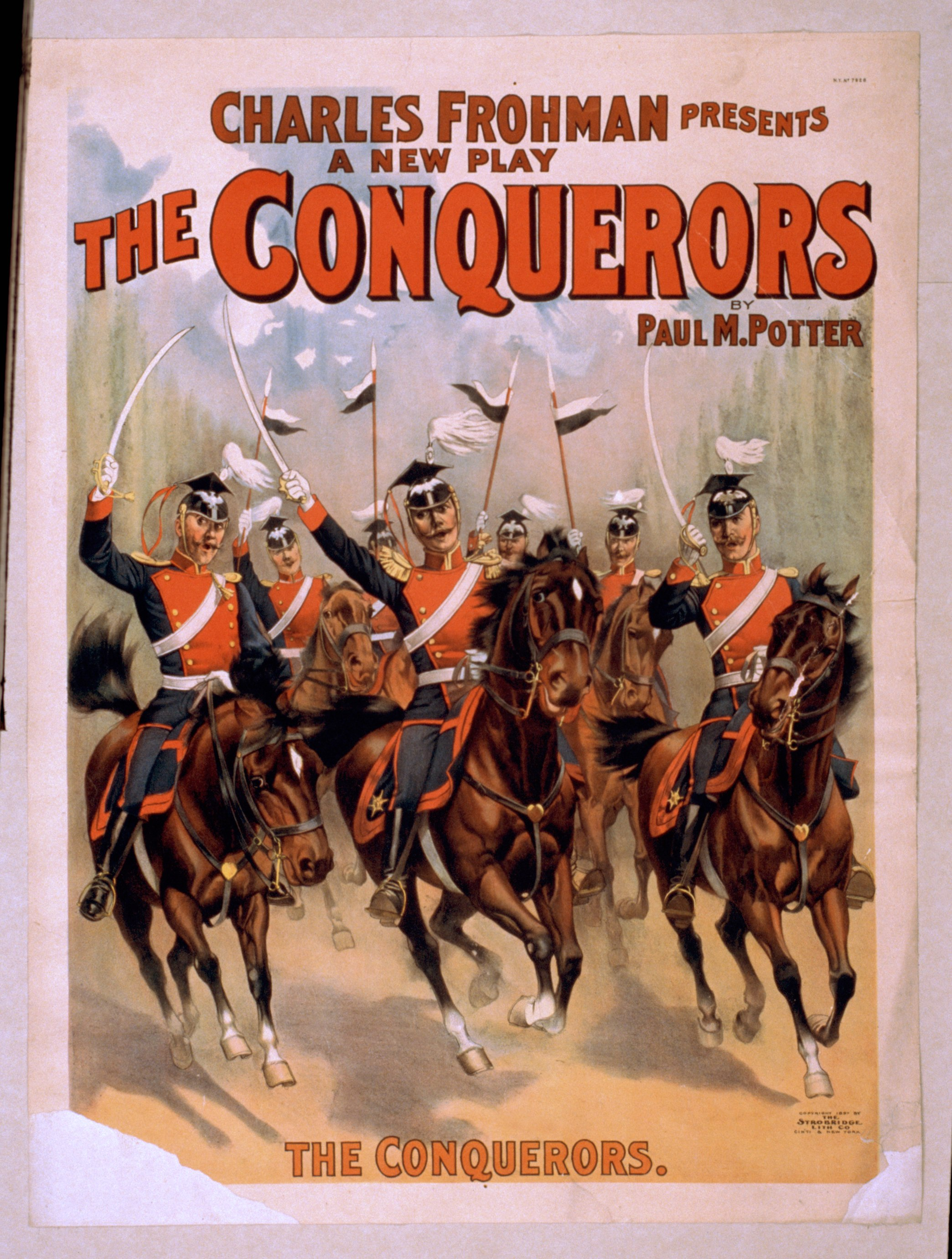
Potter's The Conquerors (1898)

The Conquerors is a drama in four acts by Paul M. Potter. Set in Dinan, Brittany, the work takes place on September 3, 1870 immediately following the Battle of Sedan. It tells the story of a French maiden, Yvonne de Grandpre, who is assaulted by a cynical Prussian officer.

The play premiered on Broadway on January 4, 1898 at the Empire Theatre in a performance by the Empire Stock Company which was led by actress Viola Allen as Yvonne, William Faversham as Eric von Rodeck, Ida Conquest as Rabble de Grandpre, W. H. Crompton as Abbé Dagobert, and J. Harry Benrimo as Major von Wolfshagen. Initial critical reaction to the work was harsh; with the New York press dismissing the work as "immoral" and a "deliberate endeavor to pander to debased tastes". It was rapidly withdrawn with the intent of rewriting the work's final act. The play was reworked and opened to better reception; becoming one of the hits of the season. It was performed in London at the St James's Theatre in 1898.

Weber and Fields spoofed the play in their Broadway musical burlesque The Con-Curers.
