= Ida Conquest =

American actress

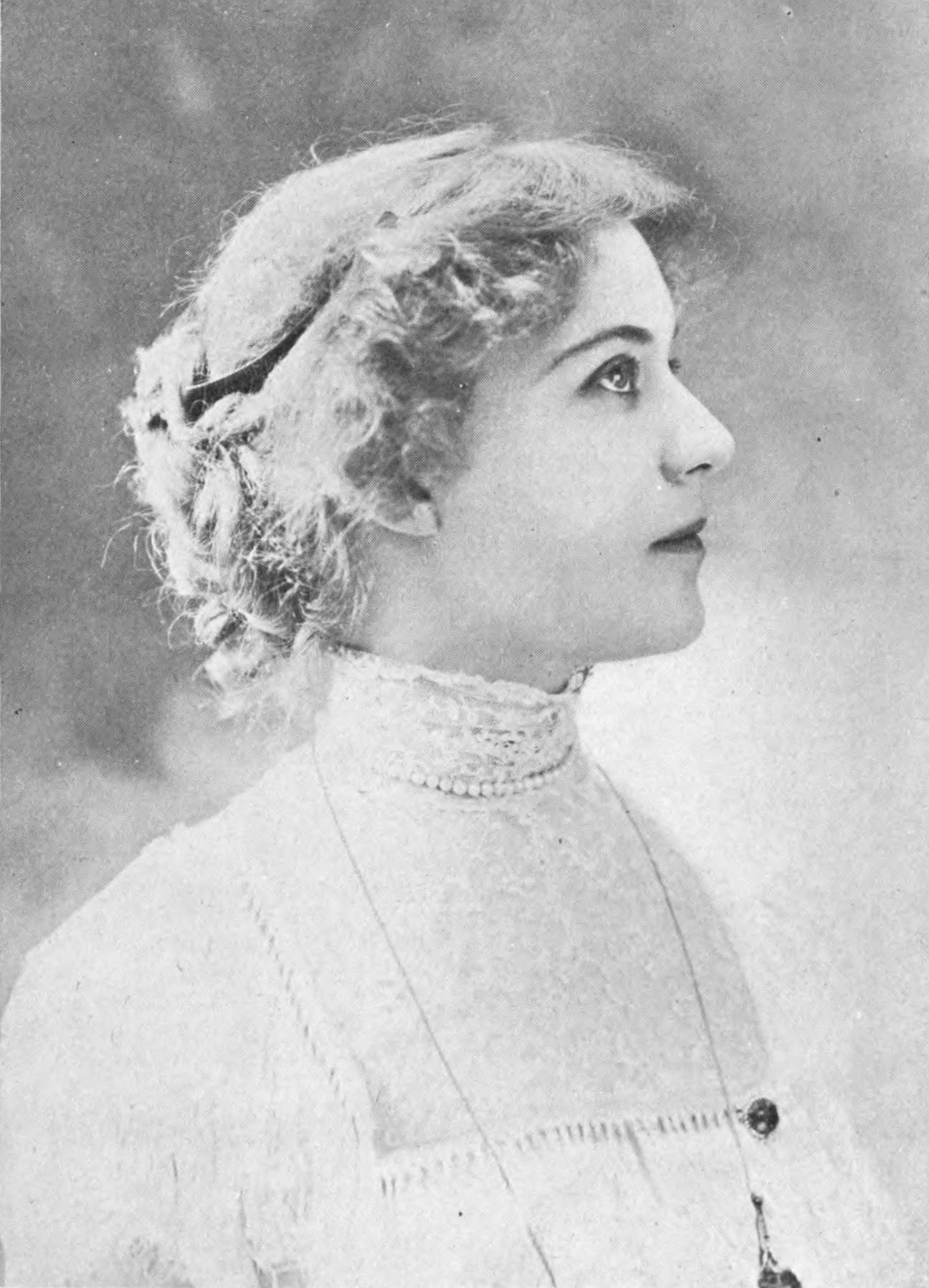
- Conquest c.1901
- Born: February 26, 1876; Boston, Massachusetts, U.S.
- Died: July 12, 1937 (aged 61); 320 East 72nd Street, Manhattan, New York City, U.S.
- Resting place: Woodlawn Cemetery, Bronx
- Occupation: Stage actress
- Years active: 1895–1911
- Spouse: Riccardo Bertelli (m. 1895)
- Children: 1

Ida Conquest (February 26, 1876 – July 12, 1937) was a leading lady of Broadway in the late 19th century and early 20th century.

== Family ==
Ida Conquest was from Boston, Massachusetts, the daughter of John Alfred Stokes Conquest and the former Elizabeth "Eliza" Harriet Mortimer of Centre Street in Brookline, Massachusetts. Her father was a partner in a successful fish wholesale business.

== Theater actress ==
Conquest's enthusiasm for theater dated from her childhood when she was in a production of Pinafore at the Boston Museum. She made her first appearance in New York at the Fifth Avenue Theatre on January 28, 1893, as the First Girl Friend in The Harvest. She began at the bottom of the ladder and according to a writer in 1900, "her advancement was thoroughly legitimate, meaning good hard work with every rung." The same reporter noted her charm, intelligence, and fine education.

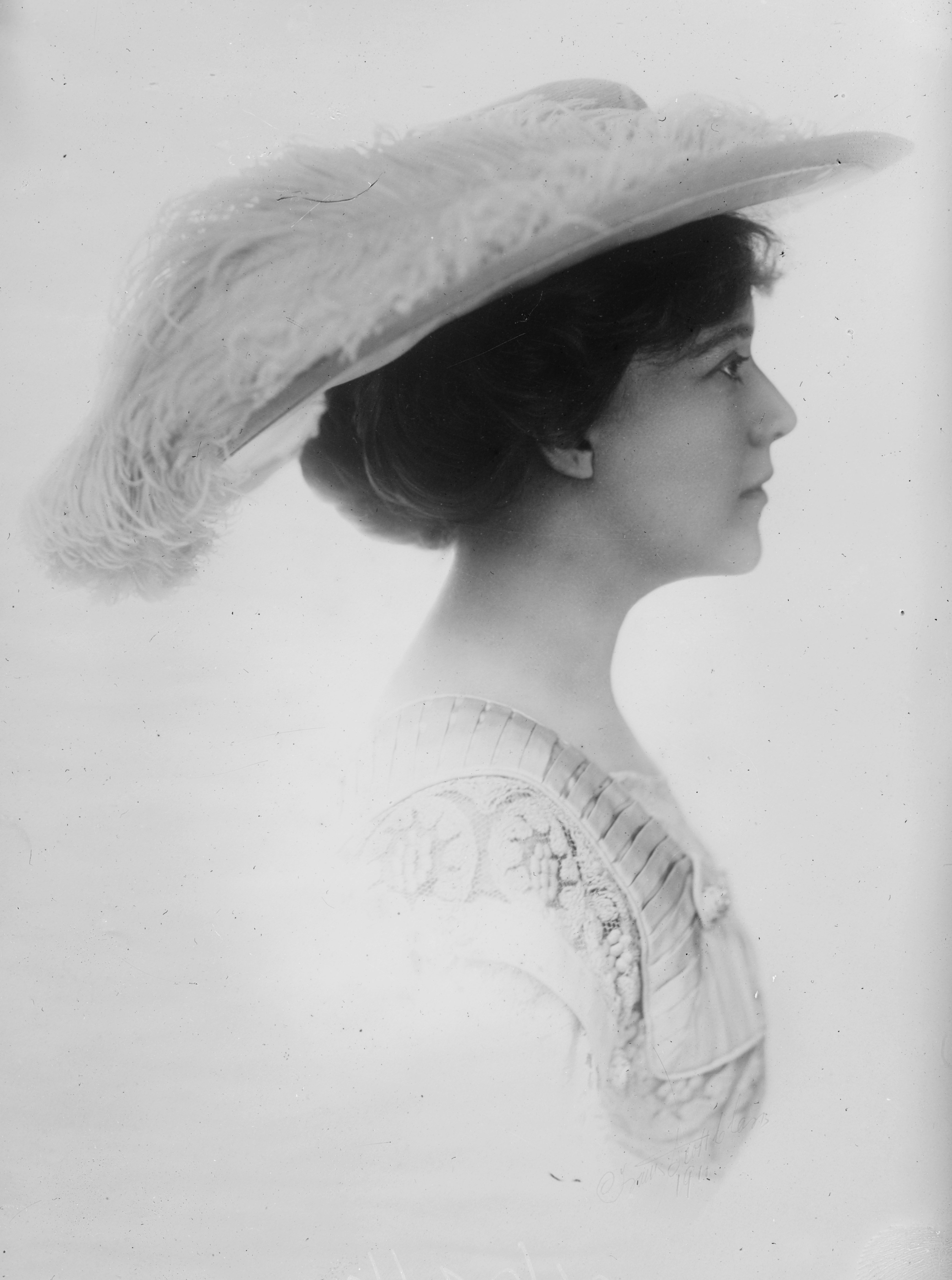
Ida Conquest in 1901

She was the leading woman for John Drew, Richard Mansfield, and William Gillette. Conquest appeared in many roles in New York City and London, England before retiring from the stage in 1911.

She made her stage debut at Miner's Theater on Fifth Avenue on January 25, 1893. She played the role of First Girl Friend in The Harvest. In 1894 she acted in support of Olga Nethersole in The Transgressor at Palmer's Theater, 485 Broadway near Broome Street. Conquest also worked with Nethersole in Camille, portraying Nanine.

She traveled to London's Garrick Theatre in 1898 with Gillette, in Too Much Johnson. At the Empire Theatre in New York City Conquest was successful in The Second In Command (1901) with Drew. Together with Drew she starred in Richard Carvel, a play based on a best-selling novel written by the American novelist Winston Churchill. Drew and Conquest again teamed to make The Tyranny of Tears. Conquest succeeded Isabel Irving as the leading lady of the John Drew Company.

She played numerous parts at the Empire Theatre. She depicted characters in Under The Red Robe, Bohemia, A Man And His Wife, and The Conquerors. In 1895 Conquest became leading lady of the Empire Theatre Company of Charles Frohman.

Conquest became associated with the English actor Mansfield at the New Amsterdam Theatre in 1904. In Ivan the Terrible she acted the character of the Empress. Paired with Mansfield she appeared in Old Heidelberg, Beau Brummel, A Parisian Romance and Beaucaire. According to friends of Conquest, the actor never demonstrated his characteristic irascibility while working with her.

In 1907 Conquest appeared in several shows at Denver's Elitch Theatre, including Leah Kleschna and the play of The Second in Command.

Additional theatrical productions in which Conquest participated are The Girl With The Green Eyes, written by Clyde Fitch, The Money Makers, Man and Superman, Little Brother of the Rich, Wolf, and The Talker.

Her final New York appearance was with Alla Nazimova in Little Eyolf (1910). Written by Henrik Ibsen, the play was staged at the Nazimova 39th Street Theatre.

== Jeweler ==
Conquest made jewelry as a hobby. To acquire proficiency she spent a number of weeks in the factory of Roman Bronze Works in Greenpoint, Brooklyn. She married the head of the company, Riccardo Bertelli, at Trinity Church, Boston, in October 1911. Bertelli, a graduate of the University of Turin, established himself in New York in the decade before he married Conquest. He was the oldest son of Admiral Luigi Bertelli of Genoa. Conquest left the stage after she wed Bertelli.

She wore a coronet which she crafted herself in the role of Sylvia in The Little Brother of the Rich. It was copied from a spray of mistletoe. She designed jewelry while she traveled, using a sketch pad and pencil as she became inspired. Conquest worked with rings, cameos, and lapis lazuli. She became skilled in setting stones and employing California abalone shells to make headpieces.

== Death ==
In 1937 Ida Conquest died at her home, 320 East 72nd Street, Manhattan, New York City. She was 61 years old.

Her funeral was conducted from St. James Episcopal Church, Madison Avenue and 71st Street. Her husband was in Europe and did not attend the service. A daughter, Gigiotta Bertelli, who later married Gabriele D'Annunzio's son Ugo, was the only member of the immediate family present.

Conquest was buried in Woodlawn Cemetery, Bronx.
