= Actors' Fidelity League =

Defunct American labor union for theater performers

- Nickname: Fidos
- Predecessor: Actors' Equity Association
- Formation: August 22, 1919; 107 years ago
- Defunct: After 1930
- Type: Trade union
- Headquarters: New York City, New York, U.S.
- Location: United States
- Products: Fidelity (publication)
- Members: 2,000 (1919)

The Actors' Fidelity League (Fidelity) was a short-lived unaffiliated American craft union representing actors who worked in live theatrical performances. It split off from Actors' Equity Association (Equity) in August 1919 when the parent organization affiliated with the American Federation of Labor (AFL) and adopted strike tactics. Fidelity approved of collective bargaining but objected to breaking contracts once signed (hence the name). A few of its members objected to trade unionism itself in the belief that they were artists rather than craftsmen. Though not a company union in the traditional sense, there was some merit in Equity accusations that the League was too close to the producers.

Initially it had over 2,000 members, but this dropped sharply after settlement of the 1919 strike. When Equity imposed a closed shop on independent producers in 1921, rank-and-file membership in the rival league declined further. The last reported activity of the Actors' Fidelity League was during May 1930.

== Background ==
=== The Equity contract ===
Equity was formed in 1913 to provide collective barginning protection for actors on the legitimate stage. It included both men and women, unlike the older White Rats which represented only white male vaudeville performers. It had no affiliation with other trade unions to begin with, such as the musicians or stagehands. Its goal was to ensure theatrical producers treated actors fairly and consistently. Equity grew rapidly, and succeeded in gaining some recognition from the United Managers Protective Association (UMPA). The UMPA under Marc Klaw eventually agreed in November 1917 to use a standard contract for signing actors, which included an arbitration clause wherein the contending parties would be Equity and the UMPA. This was known as "the Equity Contract", and its term would run for two years. However, with the breakup of the Theatrical Syndicate the UMPA was reduced to just the Klaw and Erlanger theatres. A new organization, the Producing Managers' Association (PMA) comprising some two dozen major producers, took its place, headed by Sam H. Harris.

=== Negotiations breakdown: June 1919 ===
With the Equity contract agreement set to expire that year, Equity tried to negotiate with the PMA during June 1919 for resolution of some longstanding grievences. These were half-pay for rehearsals; additional compensation for more than eight performances a week, holidays, and Sundays; and a minimum number of paid weeks per season. To measure producer compliance with the Equity contract, it sent out postcard questionnaires to its membership asking on what terms they were now employed. This provoked a reaction among some actors who considered themselves artists rather than craftsmen. They resented being asked to disclose their contract terms, though Equity had not asked for actual compensation amounts. Two objecting members, Amelia Bingham and William Gillette, publicly resigned from Equity.

When pressed to discuss the issues Equity highlighted, the PMA demurred. The producers knew that Equity on its own lacked the strength to force them to negotiate. The PMA also knew that actors as a craft were diverse in background, outlook, and especially wealth; they lacked the social and financial cohesion of traditional crafts. The PMA therefore responded by re-issuing the existing contract with a significant change: the arbitration clause would now apply only to the hiring producer and the individual actor. Arbitration as an equitable process works best when the contending parties are of equal power. An already wealthy and well-known actor might find this agreeable, but the vast majority of Equity's membership would be at a disadvantage. Equity asked William Howard Taft and Charles Evans Hughes to act as arbitrators between itself and the PMA over the contract issue. Sam H. Harris replied that there was nothing to arbitrate, and from then on the PMA ignored Equity.

=== Equity joins the AFL: July 1919 ===
An impending schism within Equity grew more likely when in mid-July the American Federation of Labor (AFL) extended the charter previously granted to the White Rats to include legitimate stage actors under Equity. This was a goal Equity had been working towards since 1918, but which had been stymied by the White Rats' opposition. A new organization within the AFL, the Associated Actors and Artists of America, made up of officers from both Equity and the White Rats, would hold the charter. This move into trade unionism strengthened Equity's position in a work stoppage, since the other crafts in the AFL, such as stage hands and musicians, would support them.

== 1919 Strike ==
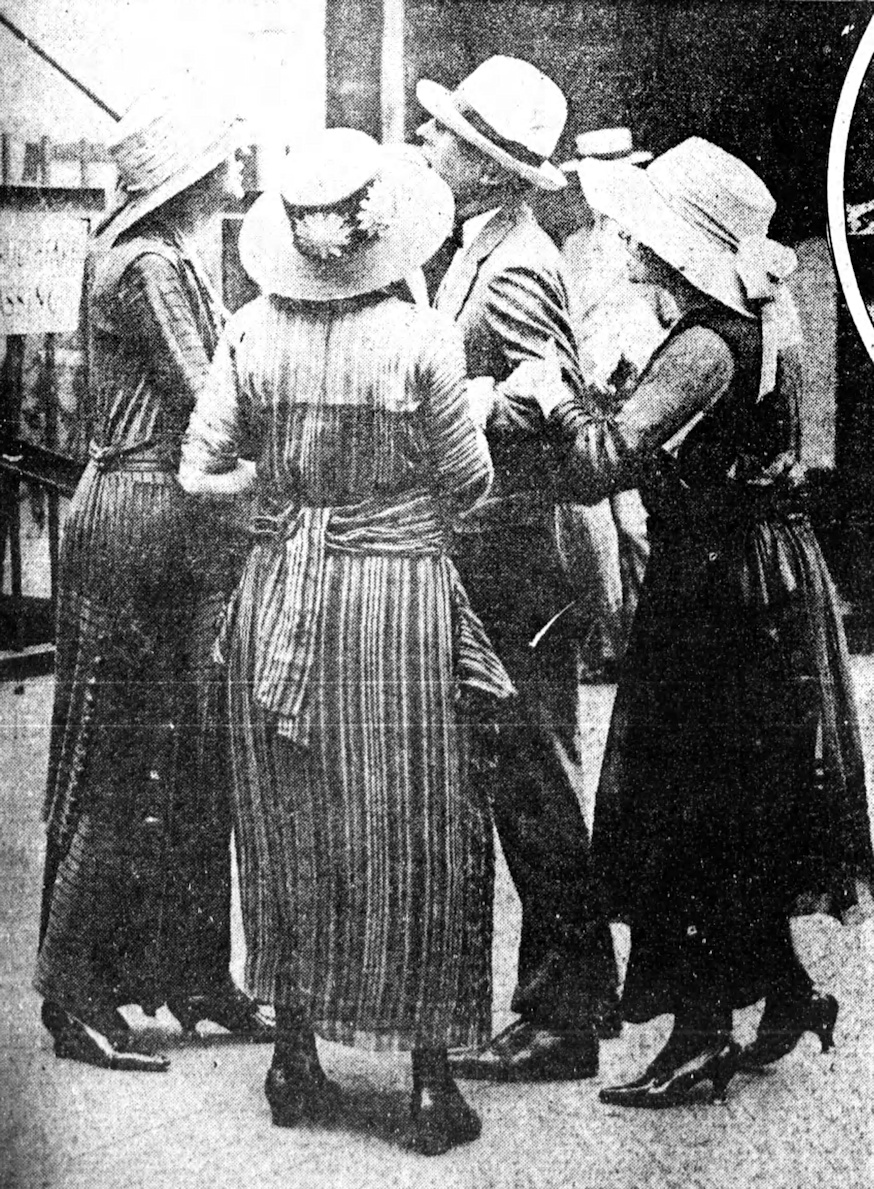
Equity picket line

As the PMA still refused to negotiate, Equity moved ahead with a limited strike, initially targeting a revival of Chu Chin Chow, then in rehearsals at the Century Theatre on July 29, 1919. It had a temporary failure when three of the four leads (Note: Equity's mistake on the first day was to call out only the lead actors for the strike, not the minor players and extras.) kept rehearsing, with Marjorie Wood resigning from Equity as well. However, the London-born Richie Ling honored the call out. He, along with three supporting actresses (Note: Lucy Beaumont, Ida Mulle, and Clara Verdera.) who walked out the second day, became Equity's first Gold Star members. At a mass meeting on August 1, 1919, the membership of Equity voted to authorize their leadership to make agreements with the stagehands and musicians' unions for joint action against the PMA.

The situation came to a boil on August 7, when a general meeting of over 1,000 Equity members voted to strike. That night twelve theatres were closed due to the walkout, and within two days the number had more than doubled. The following day Equity and AFL officials met with officers of the stagehands and musicians to discuss coordinating their activities.

The strike spread to Chicago on August 12, 1919, the same day as Equity sponsored the formation of the Chorus Equity Association, which joined the actors on strike. Theatres were not the only businesses impacted. The Daily News reported that "some of the loveliest girls of the theatre" flooded into Wall Street on August 12 to promote the strike: "Young brokers were unable to get their minds back to business after the visit and the market sagged."

== Founding of Actors' Fidelity ==
=== Reasons for opposing the strike ===
E. H. Sothern had initially supported Equity's position but when he suggested at the Equity meeting on August 7 the strike be delayed to give negotiations a chance, he was shouted down. He then resigned from Equity, citing that he had contracts for twenty-one theatres for the coming season and couldn't break all of them.

Marjorie Wood, the first Equity member to resign over the strike call, insisted that she was an artist not a laborer. This attitude was shared by some, but a more commonly expressed position was the opposition to breaking contracts. A third viewpoint was grounded in political distaste for "radical" trade unionism, as exemplified by Equity affiliating with the AFL. Zelda Sears, a former Equity council member, said her reason for quitting Equity was that players were being asked to strike productions with Equity-approved contracts.

Howard Kyle, Equity's first secretary, had resigned in early August. A newspaper reported that he and Henry Miller, Equity's first vice-president, who had also resigned were trying to start a counter group called the Actors' Co-operative Association.

=== E. H. Sothern mediation ===
By August 12 newspapers reported that E. H. Sothern was to start a new association with himself at the head. However, Sothern denied that he was trying to form a new association. His sole aim was to play peacemaker, using neutral parties to mediate between Equity and the PMA.

Sothern called for a meeting of neutral actors at the Hotel Biltmore on August 15, to find ways to mediate the strike. The meeting appointed a committee to meet with the PMA, consisting of Sothern, Mrs. Fiske, Augustus Thomas, Howard Kyle, Leo Ditrichstein and Lowell Sherman. The last two were active Equity members, present unofficially. After two meetings, Arthur Hopkins announced the PMA would accept all of the strikers demands, except for recognizing Equity's right to conduct arbitration. However, Equity rejected any contract that did not recognize the union's right to arbitration. Following this rejection, and with the stagehands now honoring Equity picket lines, E. H. Sothern announced he was "withdrawing from the situation".

=== The first meeting ===
Louis Mann went a step farther than E. H. Sothern, abandoning neutrality and proposing to settle the strike by starting a new actors' organization. Newspapers and Equity immediately tied this new organization to George M. Cohan's earlier offer to resign from the PMA and support such a group with $100,000.

The first general meeting of those actors opposed to the Equity strike occurred on August 22, 1919, at the Biltmore Hotel. Harassed by Equity partisans, (Note: Chiefly Lawrence Grant, who actually was invited up front to debate with Louis Mann and others.) and distracted by rumors of Equity misconduct, the meeting did manage to sign up 537 members. However, Cohan resisted Mann's effort to have him appointed leader by acclamation. A committee met that same night (Note: Its members were Louis Mann, Alan Dinehart, David Warfield, Alexander Leftwich, Frederick Carr, William Collier Sr., Janet Beecher, Zelda Sears, Marjorie Wood, Lenore Ulric, and Arthur Ashley.) to decide on the new organization's policies, which were presented at a second meeting the next day. This committee would also create a constitution and by-laws.

=== The second meeting ===
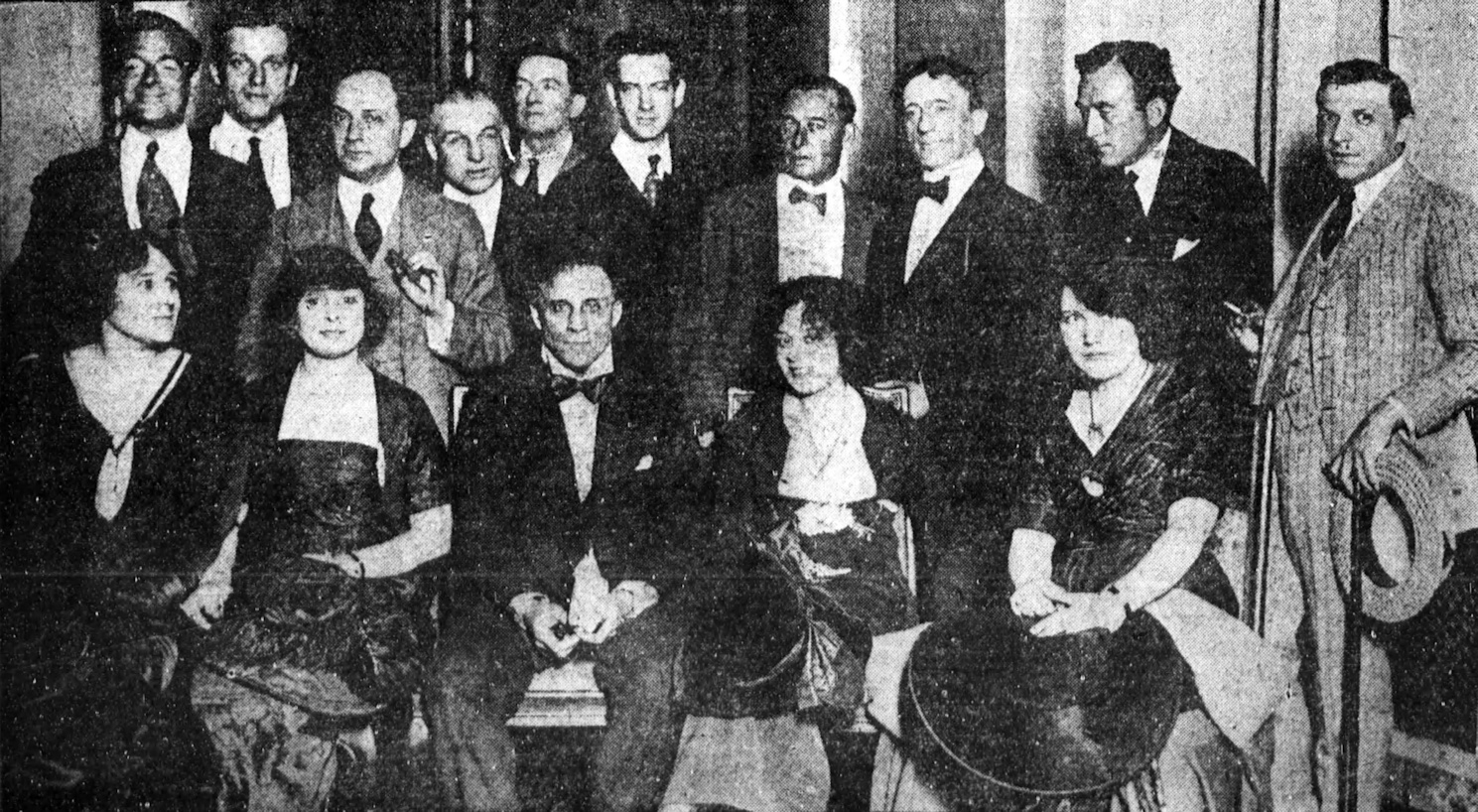
Newly-elected officers and directors of the Actors' Fidelity League on August 26, 1919

The second general meeting was held on August 23, 1919, again at the Biltmore Hotel. Louis Mann presided, and immediately asked all those not in sympathy with the new organization to depart. About a dozen Equity agitators left, but other Equity members who identified themselves and asked to stay were given permission. Alan Dinehart reported from the By-Laws Committee that the new organization would be called the "Actors' Fidelity League". Louis Mann said the committee would not accept Cohan's offer of funding, but each committee member had chipped in $100 for initial expenses. This would cover the lease of a headquarters at 122 West Forty-third Street in Manhattan.

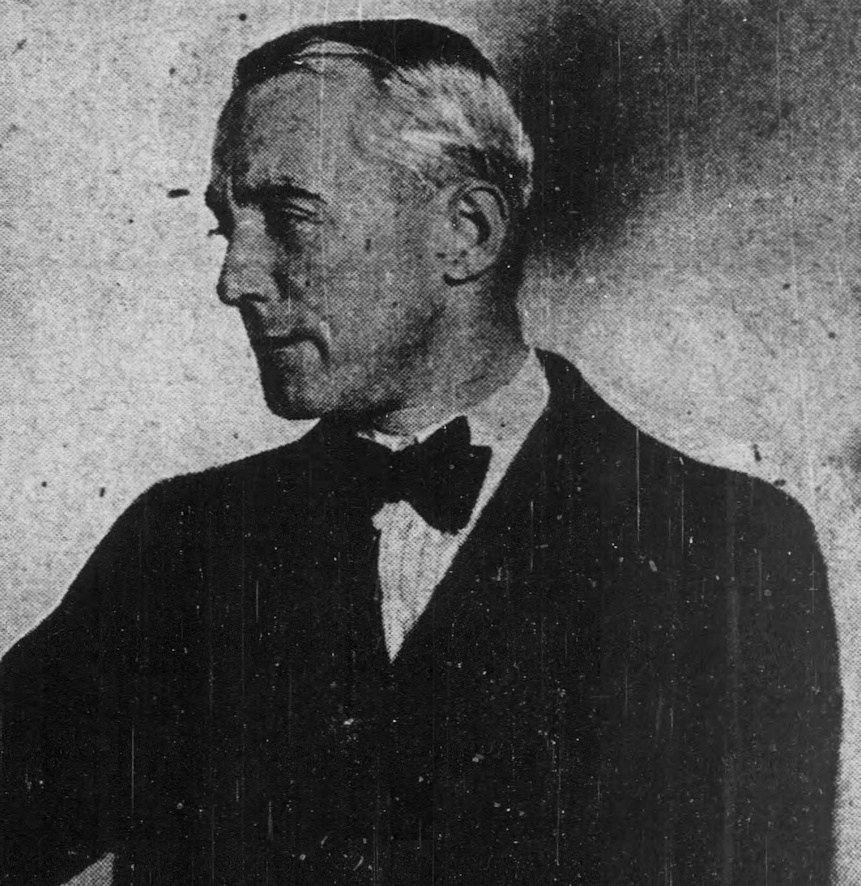
George M Cohan addresses meeting of Actors' Fidelity League on August 27, 1919

Howard Kyle read the constitution and by-laws to the meeting. The Sun reported: "Its constitution provides for the inviolability of the individual contract, contains no provision for a strike, and sets up a permanent board for arbitration.... composed of two actors, two managers, and an umpire selected by these four." There was only one change made, when José Ruben objected to a provision for any two board of director members to be able to blackball a new member. It was dropped through a motion carried by voice acclaim, with a majority of directors in an open vote now being required to reject or expel a member. Four officers, to serve one year each, and 21 board directors to serve staggered three year terms, (Note: Each year, one third of director positions would be up for election, much as in the US Senate. How this was handled initially, whether some had one year or two year terms, is unclear.) were elected. Cohan, who wasn't present, was chosen President, but a delegation informed him he wouldn't be allowed to take part in Fidelity League business until he resigned from the PMA. Cohan's $100,000 check, having been rejected by Fidelity, was donated by him to the non-partisan Actors' Fund instead.

== Growth ==
The Actors' Fidelity League was open to anyone who had twenty-six weeks performing experience. There was no restriction on nationality, nor did applicants have to sever ties with other professional organizations. Within a week of its foundation, Fidelity had retained a physician to provide medical assistance at no cost to its members, and set up a relief fund for Fidelity actors affected by the Equity strike.

George S. Kaufman had estimated before the strike the country held some 20,000 professional actors, of which 4,000 were Equity members. By Equity's own assessment their membership stood at 13,000 by strike's end. While Equity was pulling in the rank-and-file members of the profession, Mann's counter group was attracting the actor-managers. This was a much smaller middle group of performers, not as moneyed as the PMA, but successful enough to lead their own touring companies, and in the case of Henry Miller to own a Broadway theater.

After its formation, Fidelity issued daily accounts of its increasing membership. On August 25, the New York Tribune reported 783, while the next day The New York Times gave a figure of 1,184. The New York Tribune then reported a figure of 1,619 claimed by Fidelity on August 27, followed by 2,000 by August 29, 1919.

== The Fidelity contract ==
Equity members labelled their Fidelity rivals as "Fidos", suggesting their subservience to the PMA. Cohan embraced the term, saying to League members "if anyone asks, are you Equity or Fidelity, tell him 'Fido'". After negotiating with the PMA, Cohan presented a new contract to Fidelity for its approval. The Fidelity contract went beyond what Equity had asked for in terms of compensation, (Note: It granted full-pay after four weeks of rehearsals for dramatic productions and five weeks for musicals; extra pay for more than eight performances a week, and for Sundays and holidays; all footwear, costumes and gowns to be supplied by the producers; and pay day to be no later than Saturday night.) but Equity's secretary Grant Stewart pointed out there was nothing to hold producers to these terms. To allay concerns of contract enforcibility, Fidelity officers floated a new provision requiring a bond subscribed to by both signing parties to ensure compliance.

After Cohan and PMA delegate Arthur Hopkins met with Samuel Gompers in Washington, D.C., the latter made clear the AFL's continued support for Equity's position. Events were now overtaking Fidelity's attempt to influence the strike's direction. On August 30, 1919, the Shubert-owned Hippodrome Theatre gave in to the striking Chorus Equity Association and signed a new Equity contract.

== 1919 Strike settlement ==
The Fidelity contract's arbitration clause remained as two actor representatives and two for producers, these four choosing an umpire. However, Cohan expanded on this clause to another mass Fidelity meeting by saying there wasn't anything to prohibit an actor from choosing an association as one of their representatives. Coming right after the Hippodrome's surrender, Equity interpreted Cohan's explanation as a sign the producers were weakening. At a Fidelity meeting on Sept 2, 1919 a score of Equity agitators (Note: The Daily News reported four of them the next day as being Percy Helton, Frank Morgan, Charles Coughlan, and Malcolm Duncan.) interrupted both George M. Cohan and Louis Mann with heckling and laughter, to the point that the meeting ended abruptly with shoving matches and fights breaking out.

Faced with an ever expanding number of cities affected by the strike, the PMA tried to come to terms with Equity, the last remaining hurdles being the closed shop and the agreement renewal date. The producers wanted a five-year term before renewal, Equity wanted a two-year term. The PMA also wanted a clause that prohibited discrimination against any actors, including those belonging to Equity, Fidelity or non-aligned independents. Equity refused to have any mention of Fidelity in the agreement. The breakthrough came at a meeting between PMA, Equity, and representatives of the stagehands and musicians, reached at 3:30am on September 6, 1919.

According to newspaper accounts the new Equity-PMA agreement would last five years or until June 1, 1924, and recognized Equity's right to conduct arbitration on behalf of its members. The PMA had already concluded an agreement with Fidelity on the contract terms for its members; the issue of a closed shop was deferred, at the insistence of the stagehands. A later newspaper summary of the strike reported: "Upon only one phase of the strike are the members of the Equity sensitive, and that is the growth of the Actors' Fidelity league... According to the Equity, the membership of the Fidelity is made up almost wholly of managers, semi-managers and persons with managerial affiliations or relatives".

== Post-strike activity ==
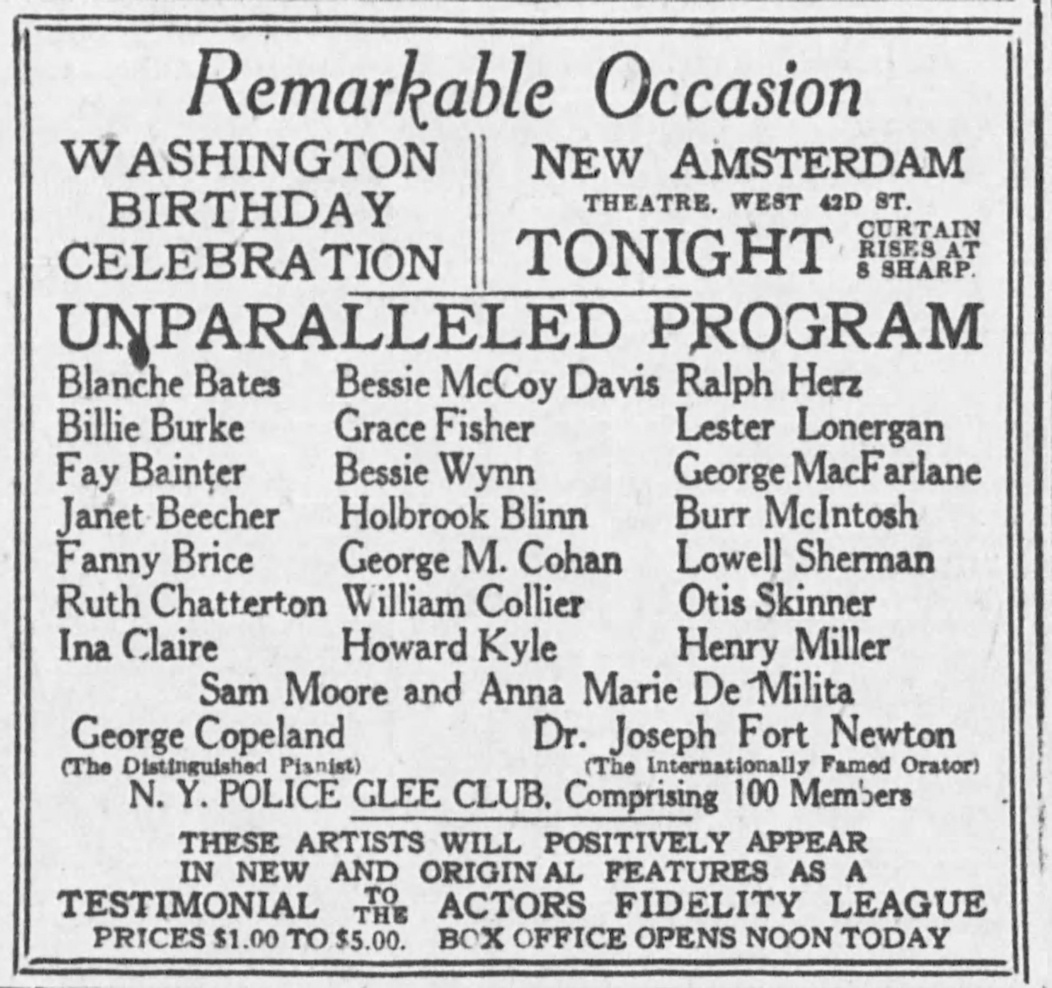
Fidelity benefit Feb 1920

At the end of the strike Fidelity claimed to have 2,000 enrolled members. By the admission of its president, it was a union and needed to raise funds for continuing operations. It mounted its first benefit performance on October 12, 1919, at the Century Theatre, with 10% of gross profits dedicated to the Actors' Fund. Fidelity signed a long-term lease for a building at 122 West 43rd Street (Note: At the time adjacent to the Henry Miller Theatre, the four-story building and address no longer exist.) in Manhattan during January 1920, which they had originally rented in August for their offices. To raise funds for refurbishing it as a clubhouse, Fidelity mounted two testimonial performances during February 1920, at which performers such as Fanny Brice and Billie Burke appeared.

By April 1920 Fidelity was down to 700 members (Equity had experienced a similar fall-off). Equity held a meeting in which it was agreed to let Fidelity actors re-apply for Equity membership, not so much a gesture of reconciliation as recognition of the difficulty both unions found in keeping dues-paying members after the strike. That same month Fidelity put on a charity benefit which drew a stern review from Alexander Woollcott, mainly because several advertised Fidelity officers were no-shows. Fidelity had more success with a legal indictment of a Billboard editor for libel, for claiming in print that Fidelity actresses were "concubines of the managers".

At Fidelity's annual meeting on May 25, 1920, George M. Cohan decided not to run for president, leaving Henry Miller a clear field for election. Cohan advised Fidelity members not to fight with Equity, nor to compete with them on benefits. By July 1920 Fidelity had begun issuing its own publication, entitled Fidelity.

== The Equity shop ==
Fidelity expanded its board of directors from 21 to 33 positions in November 1920. Later that month, a meeting between the PMA and Fidelity resulted in a statement reiterating their support for an open shop in the theatres. Equity issued a denial that it was seeking a closed shop, but just four months later its membership voted to pursue the "Equity shop".

According to Equity officers John Emerson and Frank Gilmore, as reported by the New York Tribune, "The Equity Shop... is to be in no sense a closed shop, but merely a form of unionizing which will bar non-Equity members from companies in which Equity players are engaged". The Equity shop would only apply to non-PMA theatres and companies, as the PMA's agreement with Equity allowing mixed companies would take precedence, at least until June 1924 when that agreement expired. Though Equity said its new Clause 18 (Note: "The manager agrees that all actors in the company herein employed shall be and shall continue throughout such employment to be members in good standing of the Actors' Equity Association. This contract is subordinate to the obligations of the actor herein to the A.E.A., of which obligation the manager admits notice." Source: 'Equity, Fidelity, Producers at "Outs"', The Spokesman-Review, Spokane, Washington, July 17, 1921, page 42.) would not be enforced until September 1921, it now required its members to check with union leadership before signing a contract.

The initial targets for this new clause were the Touring Managers' Association (TMA) and independent producers. Given that Equity still mustered 10,000 members, it would be difficult to mount a stage production without employing some Equity talent. Among the actor-managers of Fidelity, Cohan and Arthur Ashley closed their production companies, while Henry Miller and Blanche Bates started a tour of The Famous Mrs. Fair using just Fidelity and independent players.

== Monthly concerts and moves ==
In October 1921 Fidelity began presenting monthly "concerts" to benefit its building fund. Performed at the Henry Miller Theatre, these consisted of dramatic excerpts and one-act plays, as well as some music, singing, and dance. These were well-attended, leading one newspaper to report that "the Actors' Fidelity League is by no mean a moribund organization, existing to vex Actors' Equity". Its concert of May 28, 1922 featured Billie Burke, Helen Hayes, and Mrs. Fiske among others, and raised $19,000 for its building fund.

In January 1922 the Fidelity board proposed the return of George M. Cohan to the PMA. Cohan was allowed to resume his PMA membership, while retaining his Fidelity office, which meant he could resume producing works with mixed Equity and Fidelity casts. Henry Miller followed, joining the PMA in April 1922 while retaining the presidency of Fidelity.

Fidelity launched an open shop stock company called United Players at the Palace Theatre in White Plains, New York during May 1922. Nothing more is heard of it after the first bill.

Fidelity moved its offices and club rooms to the third floor of a building occupying 11-17 East Forty-fifth Street during November 1922.

== Equity-PMA agreement renewal ==
=== Initial negotiations ===
The 1919 agreement between Equity and the PMA would expire in June 1924. Anxious to avoid a strike, in May 1923 the PMA pre-emptively offered concessions to Equity in return for any new agreement preserving the open shop. Equity rejected this approach in a statement: "The managers will, of course, only have to give a similar benefit for their Fidelity association to nullify the advantage". Henry Miller denied Fidelity was a tool of the producers, though it undercut his argument that he and Cohan were simultaneously the two most senior officers of Fidelity and members of the PMA.

Negotiations resumed between the PMA and Equity during October 1923. This time Lee Shubert facilitated a preliminary agreement. Equity would allow only existing Fidelity actors "in good standing September 1, 1923" to take part in any future PMA productions alongside Equity members, but the Fidelity League would have to close its rolls, and all future would-be actors must join Equity. In return, Equity promised to keeps its ranks open to new applicants and not go on sympathy strikes. The PMA was split on the plan, with more producers opposing than approving. Fidelity also rejected the plan at a meeting held November 11, 1923. Among their objections was that Equity had undercounted Fidelity's membership, which according to treasurer Ruth Chatterton stood at 400 in good standing.

=== The 80-20 compromise ===
This initial agreement was considered dead by January 1924, when Equity again suggested a strike would occur come June 1 of that year. Equity re-submitted the same proposal to the PMA in March, with the difference that only 25 handpicked Fidelity members (Note: The change in terms was prompted by the realization that Fidelity had far more dues-paying members than Equity was previously prepared to admit.) would be allowed to perform in Equity shops. In April, Equity again threatened to strike on June 1 if no agreement was reached.

A new agreement, known as the 80-20 compromise, was reached by May 1, driven by the Shuberts, who controlled 70% of theaters but were not themselves interested in production. Rather than impose the full Equity shop, stage productions covered by the agreement could have one Fidelity League or independent actor for every four Equity cast members. This was a solution acceptable to the majority of producers. Equity agreed to it, because each non-Equity cast member so employed would have to pay $12, equal to annual Equity dues, to a special fund. This made it clear to both Fidelity and independents that they worked only at the sufferance of Equity. The PMA as constituted would dissolve, to be replaced by a new organization, the Managers' Protective Association. The new producers organization would hold the ten-year agreement with Equity, not the old, thus sidelining any producers opposed to the agreement.

=== Miller's gaffe and Supreme Court injunction ===
Incensed by the 80-20 compromise, Henry Miller issued a diatribe against it on May 8, for which he appended names of prominent Fidelity members without having secured their permission first. The backlash led to two resignations from Fidelity, William Faversham and David Warfield. Miller apologised in public for his transgression, which didn't prevent Fidelity members from re-electing him as president in May 1924.

Fidelity's treasurer, Ruth Chatterton, had its attorney file a petition for an injunction with the New York Supreme Court, asking it to set aside the proposed ten-year 80-20 agreement. This was a forlorn hope, for the remains of the old PMA had tried the same maneuver in late May and had it denied by Supreme Court Justice McCook. As it was, Supreme Court Justice Platzek simply noted the previous decision, already upheld by the New York Court of Appeals, in denying the new injunction on July 7, 1924.

This was the last significant action taken by the Fidelity League, which by the terms of the 80-20 agreement would now have to close its rolls in order for its current members to keep working.

== Decline and ending ==
The Supreme Court's rejection of Fidelity's challenge to the new 10-year agreement dealt the final blow to its status as a union. Though it would last for five more years, Equity no longer even regarded it as an annoyance, let alone a threat. It continued to exist simply because its remaining members could not bring themselves to acknowledge Equity's triumph.

The annual election for officers of the Actors' Fidelity League took place on May 27, 1930. Since 1929 it had been held in a private home, indicating that Fidelity had passed the point of needing a large venue. George M. Cohan was re-elected as president; Mrs. Fiske and Louis Mann were chosen as first and second vice-presidents, and Howard Kyle as secretary-treasurer. Eleven other members were elected for three-year terms as directors. This was the last reported activity of Fidelity. A few years later, a blind item in a newspaper stated: "No one remembers what became of the Actors' Fidelity League".

== Officers and membership ==
Officers and Membership Numbers of the Actors' Fidelity League
Year	President	1st Vice-Pres	2nd Vice-Pres	Secretary	Treasurer	Members	Cites
1919	George M. Cohan	Louis Mann	Howard Kyle (Note: This position was created in November 1919 and filled by election at a mass meeting. Kyle won by default when the only other candidate, Julia Arthur, withdrew her bid for the post.)	Alan Dinehart	William Collier Sr. Ruth Chatterton (Note: Chatterton took over this position in late December 1919; whether by appointment or election is not known.)	2,000	
1920	Henry Miller	George M. Cohan	Louis Mann	Howard Kyle	Ruth Chatterton	700	
1921	Henry Miller	George M. Cohan	Louis Mann	Howard Kyle	Ruth Chatterton	300	
1922	Henry Miller	George M. Cohan	Louis Mann	Howard Kyle	Ruth Chatterton		
1923	Henry Miller	George M. Cohan	Louis Mann	Howard Kyle	Ruth Chatterton	400	
1924	Henry Miller	George M. Cohan	Louis Mann	Howard Kyle	Ruth Chatterton	341	
1925	Henry Miller (Note: Miller died about 8 weeks before his sixth term of office expired.)	George M. Cohan	Louis Mann	Howard Kyle	Ruth Chatterton	160	
1926	Holbrook Blinn	George M. Cohan	Louis Mann	Howard Kyle	Edward J. Mackay		
1927	Holbrook Blinn	George M. Cohan	Louis Mann	Howard Kyle	Edward J. Mackay		
1928	Holbrook Blinn (Note: Blinn died less than two months into his third term of office.)	George M. Cohan (Note: Cohan took over as acting president after Blinn's death, with Mrs. Fiske as acting first vice-president.)	Louis Mann	Howard Kyle	Edward J. Mackay		
1929	George M. Cohan	Mrs. Fiske	Louis Mann	Howard Kyle	Edward J. Mackay		
1930	George M. Cohan	Mrs. Fiske	Louis Mann	Howard Kyle	Howard Kyle		

== Board of directors ==
Directors of the Actors' Fidelity League (Incomplete except for 1919)
Year	Elected	Retired	Resigned	Cites
1919	Arthur Ashley, Fay Bainter, George Barnum, Janet Beecher, Holbrook Blinn, Frederic Carr, Julia Dean, Mrs. Fiske, W. H. Gilmore, John Halliday, Gladys Hanson, Lester Lonergan, George MacFarlane, Willard Mack, José Ruben, Zelda Sears, Lowell Sherman, Otis Skinner, Lenore Ulric, Marjorie Wood	N/A	Julia Dean (Note: Her name had been placed on the ballot without her knowledge while she was touring out of town. In a telegram to Equity she denied even being a member of the League. She was replaced by Florence Nash.)	
1920	Fay Bainter, Blanche Bates, Holbrook Blinn, Mrs. Fiske, Frances Starr, David Warfield, Marjorie Wood. Appointed Nov 1920: Kenyon Bishop, Lionel Braham, Ina Claire, Patricia Collinge, Curtis Cooksey, Arleen Hackett, Ben Johnson, Wilson Reynolds, Marguerite St. John, Frank L. Sylvester, Sidney Toler, Olive Wyndham.	Lenore Ulric, Lowell Sherman		
1921	Laura Hope Crews, Minnie Dupree, May Irwin, Lenore Ulric			
1922	Margaret Anglin, Ivah Wills Coburn, William Collier Sr., Ernest Elton, Arleen Hackett, Helen Hayes, Wilson Reynolds, Thomas E. Shea, Otis Skinner, Robert Vaughn			
1923	Fay Bainter, Amelia Bingham, Holbrook Blinn, Lionel Braham, Ina Claire, Curtis Cooksey, Mrs. Fiske, Frances Starr, David Warfield, Marjorie Wood			
1924	Kenyon Bishop, Cynthia Brooke, Laura Hope Crews, Gladys Hanson, May Irwin, Ben Johnson, Helen G. Judson, Clara Lipman, Marguerite St. Johns, Zelda Sears, Sidney Toler		David Warfield	
1925	Margaret Anglin, Alma Clayburgh, Ivah Wills Coburn, William Collier Sr., Eileen Huban, Arlean Hackett, Wilson Reynolds, Thomas E. Shea, Otis Skinner, Blanche Talbot, Robert Vaughn			
1926	Fay Bainter, Amelia Bingham, Ruth Chatterton, Ina Claire, Mrs. Fiske, Albert S. Howson, Helen G. Judson, Frances Starr, Lenore Ulric, Marjorie Wood			
1927	Kenyon Bishop, Cynthia Brooke, Laura Hope Crews, Gladys Hanson, May Irwin, Ben Johnson, Helen G. Judson, Clara Lipman, Marguerite St. Johns, Zelda Sears, Sidney Toler		Frances Starr	
1928	Margaret Anglin, Alma Clayburgh, Ivah Wills Coburn, William Collier Sr, Charles Hopkins, Eileen Huban, Charlotte Titell Munroe, Wilson Reynolds, Thomas E. Shea, Otis Skinner, Blanche Talbot			
1929	Fay Bainter, Ruth Benson-Blinn, Ruth Chatterton, Amy Hodges, John E. Gorman, Albert S. Howson, Helen G. Judson, Lynn Starling, Lenore Ulric, Antoinette Walker, Marjorie Wood			
1930	Kenyon Bishop, Cynthia Brooke, Laura Hope Crews, Loretta Healy Howson, May Irwin, Cynthia Latham, Clara Lipman, Marguerite St. Johns, Zelda Sears, William Slider, Lark Taylor			
