= Florence Rogge =

American choreographer

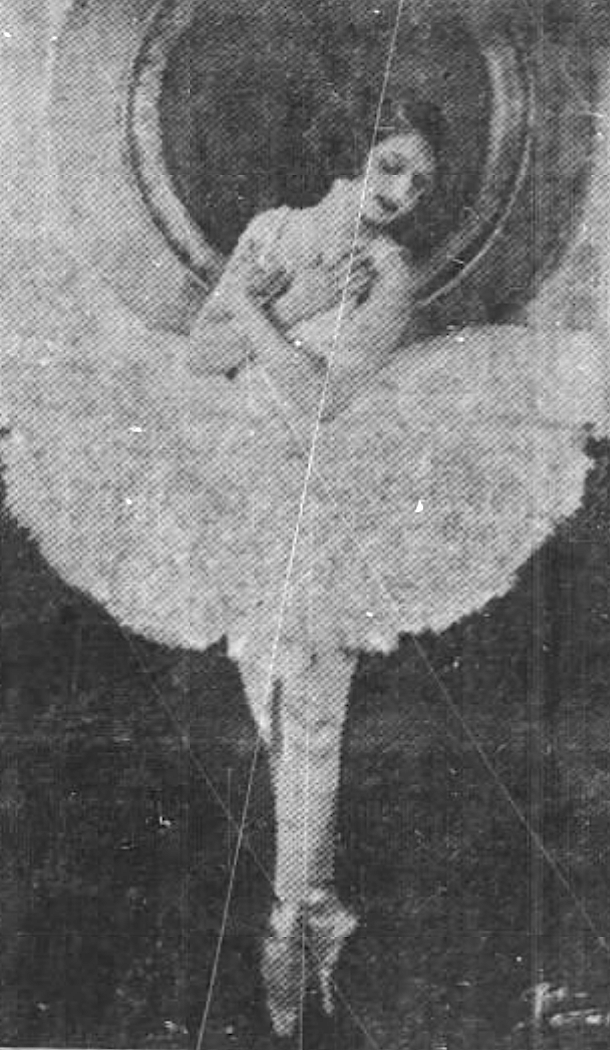
- Florence Rogge as a young ballerina, from a 1922 newspaper
- Born: December 20, 1904; Detroit, Michigan
- Died: October 26, 1992 (aged 87); Miami, Florida
- Occupations: Choreographer, dancer, theatrical producer
- Spouse: Joseph J. Dickman

Florence Rogge (December 20, 1904 – October 26, 1992) was an American dancer and choreographer, and artistic director of the Corps de Ballet at Radio City Music Hall from 1932 to 1952.

== Early life and education ==
Rogge was born in Detroit, Michigan, one of the six daughters of Gustav Rogge and Wilhelmine "Minnie" Berg, both of German descent. Her father was born in Germany and her mother was born in Wisconsin.

== Career ==
Rogge ran a dance studio with Leon Leonidoff in the 1920s, and worked with him and Léonide Massine at the Roxy Theatre. She also worked in Toronto for a time, dancing, teaching and directing theatrical productions. In 1931, she was a guest artist at a meeting of the New York Society of Teachers of Dancing.

Rogge was the artistic director and choreographer of the Corps de Ballet at Radio City Music Hall from its inaugural program in 1932 into the 1950s. She designed an original dance program to support each new film shown at the theatre, with fresh programs every few weeks. In 1933, the New York Times dance critic John Martin wrote that Rogge's "routines are distinctly of the 'commercial' type, amorphous and styleless." She was the first woman to produce a show at Radio City Music Hall, in 1935. Her sister Hattie was also on the Radio City staff, as a costume designer.

Rogge's Broadway credits included choreography for two shows, The Well of Romance (1930) and Virginia (1937). A painting by Jules Cannert, depicting Rogge in a barefoot dance pose, was the cover illustration of the February 1930 issue of The Dance magazine. Al Hirschfeld drew Rogge at the control board of the Radio City Music Hall stage in 1940.

She retired from Radio City Music Hall in October 1952, succeeded by her assistant, Margaret Sande.

== Personal life ==
In 1932, Leon Leonidoff's wife made public accusations about the nature of his relationship with Rogge. In 1933, Rogge married businessman Joseph J. Dickman. The Dickmans spent their winters in Florida in the 1950s. She died in Miami, Florida in 1992, at the age of 87.
