= The Well of Romance =

Musical by Preston Sturges and H. Maurice Jacquet

- Cover of the Broadway program
- Music: H. Maurice Jacquet
- Lyrics: Preston Sturges
- Book: Preston Sturges
- Productions: 1930 Broadway

The Well of Romance is a 1930 musical comedy operetta in two acts with book and lyrics by Preston Sturges and music by H. Maurice Jacquet. It was Sturges' fourth production to appear on Broadway.

The play originated in an operetta called Silver with music by Jacquet, which had a very large cast, but flopped and sent its backers into bankruptcy. Sturges was to provide a new book and lyrics to use with the existing music and sets. Money for the new production was put up by Sturges, and by Eleanor Hutton, an heiress who had just recently married Sturges.

The Broadway production was staged by J. H. Benrimo, choreographed by Leon Leonidoff and Florence Rogge, with chorus direction by Jacques Pintel. It was produced by G. W. McGregor. The Well of Romance opened on November 7, 1930 at the Craig Theatre, and ran for just 8 performances, closing on November 12.

The play takes place at an inn in the spring of 1849.
