= Find the Woman =

1922 film by Tom Terriss

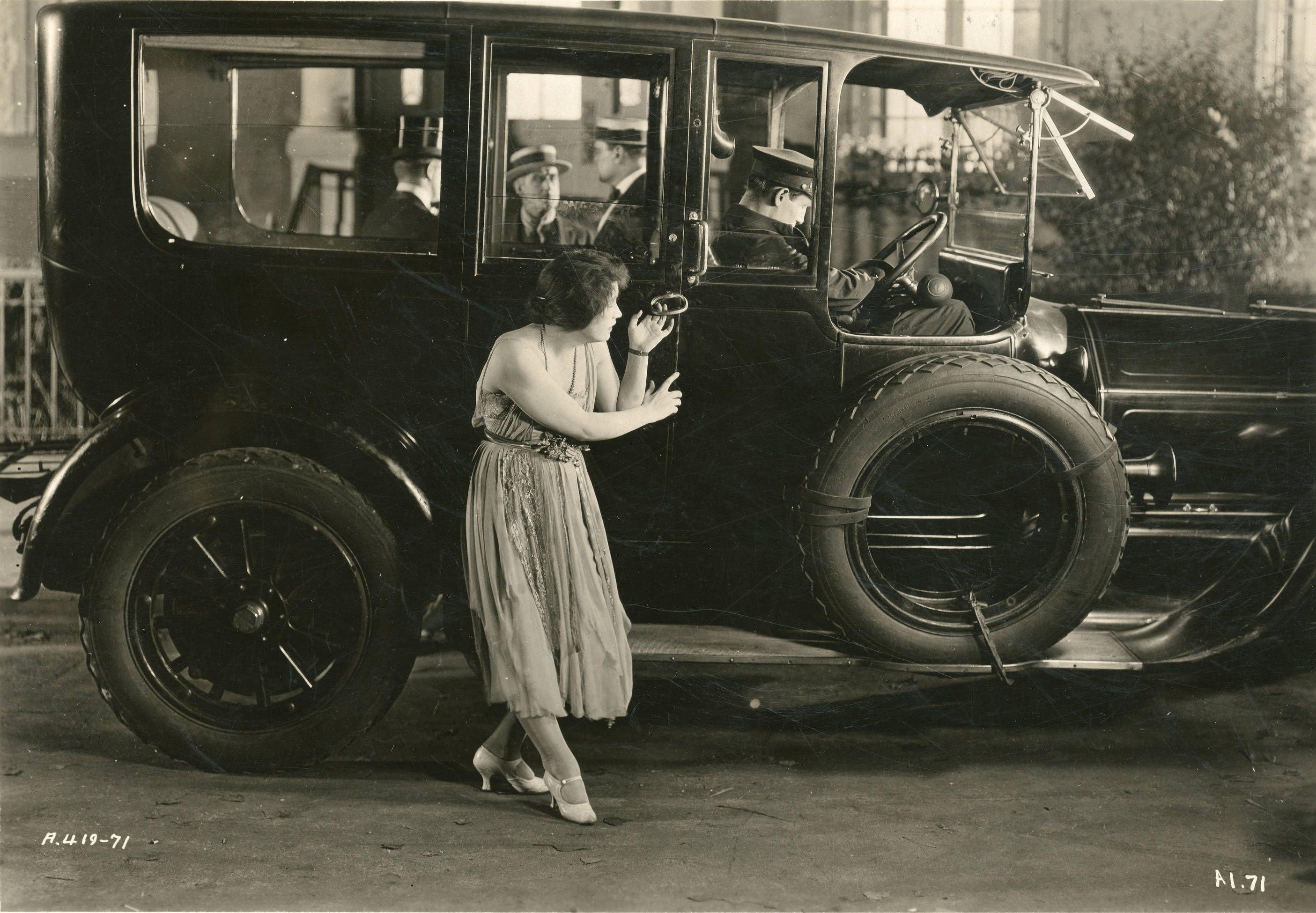
- Film still
- Directed by: Tom Terriss
- Written by: Doty Hobart (scenario)
- Produced by: Cosmopolitan Productions
- Starring: Alma Rubens
- Cinematography: Ira H. Morgan
- Distributed by: Paramount Pictures
- Release date: April 2, 1922
- Running time: 60 minutes; 6 reels (5,144 feet)
- Country: United States
- Language: Silent (English intertitles)

Find the Woman is a 1922 American silent mystery film directed by Tom Terriss and starring Alma Rubens. It was produced by Cosmopolitan Productions, owned by William Randolph Hearst, and distributed by Paramount Pictures. The film is based on the 1921 novel of the same name by Arthur Somers Roche.

An incomplete print survives in the Library of Congress.

== Plot ==
As described in a film magazine, Sophie Carey, a wealthy lady married to worthless cur Don Carey, wrote letters to Judge Walbrough before her marriage. Booking agent Morris Beiner has obtained these letters and attempts to blackmail the judge. Clancy Deane, a young woman from the country who has been lured to Broadway by its bright lights, finds lodging in a cheap theatrical boarding house. She meets a man and his wife who direct the aspiring actress to the theatrical agent. At his office, Clancy repulses his advances, and the agent falls and is stunned. Sophie also goes to the agent's office, where he is later found dead and a piece of Sophie's gown is the only clue the police have to the murder. Several other people emerge as possible suspects to the crime, and in the end Sophie's husband is trapped and confesses his guilt.

== Cast ==
- Alma Rubens as Sophie Carey
- Eileen Huban as Clancy Deane
- Harrison Ford as Philip Vandevent
- George MacQuarrie as Judge Walbrough
- Norman Kerry as Marc Weber
- Ethel Duray as Fab Weber
- Arthur Donaldson as Morris Beiner
- Henry Sedley as Don Carey
- Sydney Deane as Sofford
- Emily Fitzroy as Mrs. Napoli
