= The Company She Keeps =

1951 film by John Cromwell

- Directed by: John Cromwell
- Written by: Ketti Frings
- Produced by: John Houseman; Sid Rogell
- Starring: Lizabeth Scott; Jane Greer; Dennis O'Keefe
- Cinematography: Nicholas Musuraca
- Edited by: Robert Swink
- Music by: Leigh Harline
- Production company: RKO Radio Pictures
- Distributed by: RKO Radio Pictures
- Release dates: January 28, 1950 (New York); February 16, 1950 (Los Angeles)
- Running time: 82 minutes
- Country: United States
- Language: English

The Company She Keeps is a 1951 American drama film directed by John Cromwell and starring Lizabeth Scott, Jane Greer and Dennis O'Keefe. It was produced and distributed by RKO Pictures. Cromwell had directed Caged the previous year, another film about a woman who serves a prison sentence. The Company She Keeps marks Jeff Bridges' film debut.

== Plot ==
Released from prison after serving two years on a check-forging charge, Mildred Lynch changes her name to Diane Stuart and moves to Los Angeles. Parole officer Joan Willburn finds Diane a job at a hospital. However, Diane steals Joan's boyfriend Larry Collins and hides the relationship from Joan and her past from Larry. When Joan learns of the affair, she warns Diane that to marry, she must first seek approval from the parole board, which will be obligated to inform Larry.

Despite all of the help that she has received from Joan, Diane accuses Joan of trying to sabotage her romance and her parole after Diane is arrested for a drug theft at the hospital that she did not commit. Larry informs Diane that Joan has caused the charges to be dismissed.

== Cast ==
- Lizabeth Scott as Joan
- Jane Greer as Diane
- Dennis O'Keefe as Larry
- Fay Baker as Tilly
- John Hoyt as Judge Kendall
- James Bell as Mr. Neeley
- Don Beddoea s Jamieson
- Bert Freed as Smitty
- Irene Tedrow as Mrs. Seeley
- Marjorie Wood as Mrs. Haley
- Marjorie Crossland as Mrs. Griggs
- Virginia Farmer as Mrs. Harris
- Theresa Harris as Lilly Johnson
- Victoria Horne as Marcia Guston
- Charles Wagenheim as Pete
- Virginia Vincent as Annabelle Bird
- Kenneth Tobey as Rex Fisher
- Beau Bridges as Obie
- Frances Morris as Mrs. McLean
- Adrienne Marden as Amy Bower
- Kathleen Freeman as Josie
- Jeff Bridges as Infant at Train Station (uncredited)

== Reception ==
In a contemporary review for The New York Times, critic Bosley Crowther wrote: "Don't inquire now if it makes sense. That would be slightly absurd. And Miss Scott playing a woman parole officer is the least of its sheer absurdities. The whole picture has, indeed, a flavor of the cheapest and pulpiest romance. typified in the banal flirtation by which Miss Greer and Mr. O'Keefe fall in love. As for its entertainment value, that, we would say, is on a par. Things might have been a little better if Miss Scott had sent Miss Greer back to jail."

Critic Edwin Schallert of the Los Angeles Times wrote: "The love interest is bound to seem far-fetched notwithstanding it is [sic] very convincingly portrayed Miss Scott's role as a parole officer (a rather unsuitable assignment) has to be pallidly presented to justify the whole thing, and Dennis O'Keefe's character is somewhat unsteady too. There's no fault with the performances as such, though Miss Greer has all the best of it, and makes the most of it."

The film recorded a loss of $315,000.
