= Producing Managers' Association =

Defunct American stage producers and theatre owners coalition

- Predecessor: United Managers Protective Association
- Formation: April 23, 1919; 107 years ago
- Dissolved: June 1, 1924
- Headquarters: New York City, New York, U.S.
- Location: United States
- Members: 29 (1924)
- President: Sam H. Harris
- Vice-President: George Broadhurst
- Secessions: Managers Protective Association (1924)

The Producing Managers' Association (PMA) was a coalition of theatrical managers established on April 23, 1919. Formed in an effort to reduce conflicts between producers and theater managers and share common interests, it became the main vehicle for negotiation with the Actors' Equity Association (Equity) and Actors' Fidelity League (Fidelity) during the 1919 actors' strike.

== Formation ==
By 1919 the former Theatrical Syndicate had dissolved and its coalition, the United Managers Protective Association (UMPA) had been reduced to just the Klaw and Erlanger theatres. The UMPA had signed an agreement with Equity which would come up for renewal in 1919. The remaining independent theater producers were in disarray, competing among each other and poaching stars while facing common problems of censorship, taxation, ticket speculation, and the impending negotiations with Equity.

John Golden first floated the idea of a producer's organization to a group who were vacationing in Palm Beach, Florida. He wanted to set up a forum so the producers could share ideas, and wanted stop the rival organizations poaching each other's stars. Golden organized a lunch at the Claridge Hotel in Atlantic City, New Jersey, attended by about forty managers. Attendees included Golden's fellow producers Fred Zimmerman, Archibald Selwyn, Florenz Ziegfeld Jr., Winchell Smith and L. Lawrence Weber. The PMA was launched by unanimous agreement.

== Activities ==
Given the temperaments of the producers, meetings were often stormy. At one session David Belasco banged so hard on the table that he split his hand and needed medical aid. On 2 May 1919 Charles Coburn, a former actor and now a manager, invited members of Equity to meet the managers for lunch at the Claridge. The mood of the lunch meeting quickly turned to anger, with the managers adamant that they would not let Equity establish a closed shop. Over the summer the AEA came under increasing pressure to make a deal with the managers from actors who had no other guarantee of employment. However, the strike was launched in August 1919, closing selective shows. After a month, after 37 productions had been closed and 16 openings had been stopped, the strike was settled on 6 September 1919. The managers signed a five-year contract in which they recognized Equity and promised better conditions.

== 1924 Equity-PMA agreement renewal ==
The 1919 agreement between Equity and the PMA was due to expire on June 1, 1924. The PMA itself was undergoing a schism between the production managers and the theatre owners. The Shubert family, who owned 70% of theatres in Manhattan, had no interest in production. Lee Shubert brokered an agreement with Equity called the 80-20 compromise. This agreement allowed one Fidelity or independent actor for every four Equity actors in a cast, thus giving lip service to the ideal of the open shop. Equity acquiesced to this since every non-Equity performer so employed would have to pay an amount equal to annual Equity dues into a special fund. In addition, Fidelity would have to agree to close its rolls; all future would-be actors must join Equity. The agreement would be for ten years, during which Equity pledged to accept any new actors whom the producers cast.

To bring the agreement into effect, Lee Shubert and his allies within the PMA planned to force a vote to dissolve that coalition and create a new one called the Managers' Protective Association (MPA). The new Equity agreement would then be with the MPA, bypassing any PMA holdouts. However, Shubert's faction was shy of the votes needed to force the dissolution. Thus the PMA continued with reduced membership, while Shubert and his allies seceded from it and set up the MPA.

Those producers remaining in the PMA would now either be forced to adopt the Equity shop (a euphemism for the closed shop that Equity had first imposed on independent producers in 1921), or join the MPA. To forestall this new agreement, the PMA filed a plea with the New York Supreme Court for an injunction against Equity and the MPA. Supreme Court Justice McCook denied the plea, which ruling was upheld by the New York Court of Appeals on June 27, 1924.
