= Virginia (operetta) =

1937 operetta

Virginia is a 1937 operetta with music by Arthur Schwartz, lyrics by Albert Stillman, and a book by Laurence Stallings and Owen Davis.

The music was orchestrated by Ardon Cornwell, Hans Spialek, Phil Wall, Will Vodery and Maurice Baron; Lee Montgomery and Ken Christie served as vocal arrangers. The work premiered on Broadway at the Center Theatre on September 2, 1937, with a cast that included Mona Barrie as Lady Agatha, Gordon Richards as Captain Somerset, Lansing Hatfield as Captain Boyd, Dennis Hoey as Sir Guy Carleton, Gene Lockhart as Fortesque, Bertha Belmore as Minnie Fortesque, Anne Booth as Sylvia Laurence, Avis Andrews as Miranda, Helen Carroll as Daphne, Esta Elman as Phyllis, John W. Bubbles as Scipio, Ford L. Buck as Hannibal, Patricia Bowman as the Prima Ballerina of Drury Lane, Valia Valentinoff as the Premiere Dancer of Drury Lane, Ronald Graham as Colonel Richard Fairfax, and Nigel Bruce as His Excellency, the Governor of the Colony.

Set in Colonial Williamsburg at the moment of the United States Declaration of Independence, the production was staged by Leon Leonidoff and Edward Clarke Lilley; choreographed by Florence Rogge, and produced by John Kenneth Hyatt and the Rockefeller family who owned the theater. Lee Simonson designed the sets and Irene Sharaff designed the costumes. The production closed on October 23, 1937, after 60 performances.
