= The Willow Tree (1920 film) =

1920 film by Henry Otto

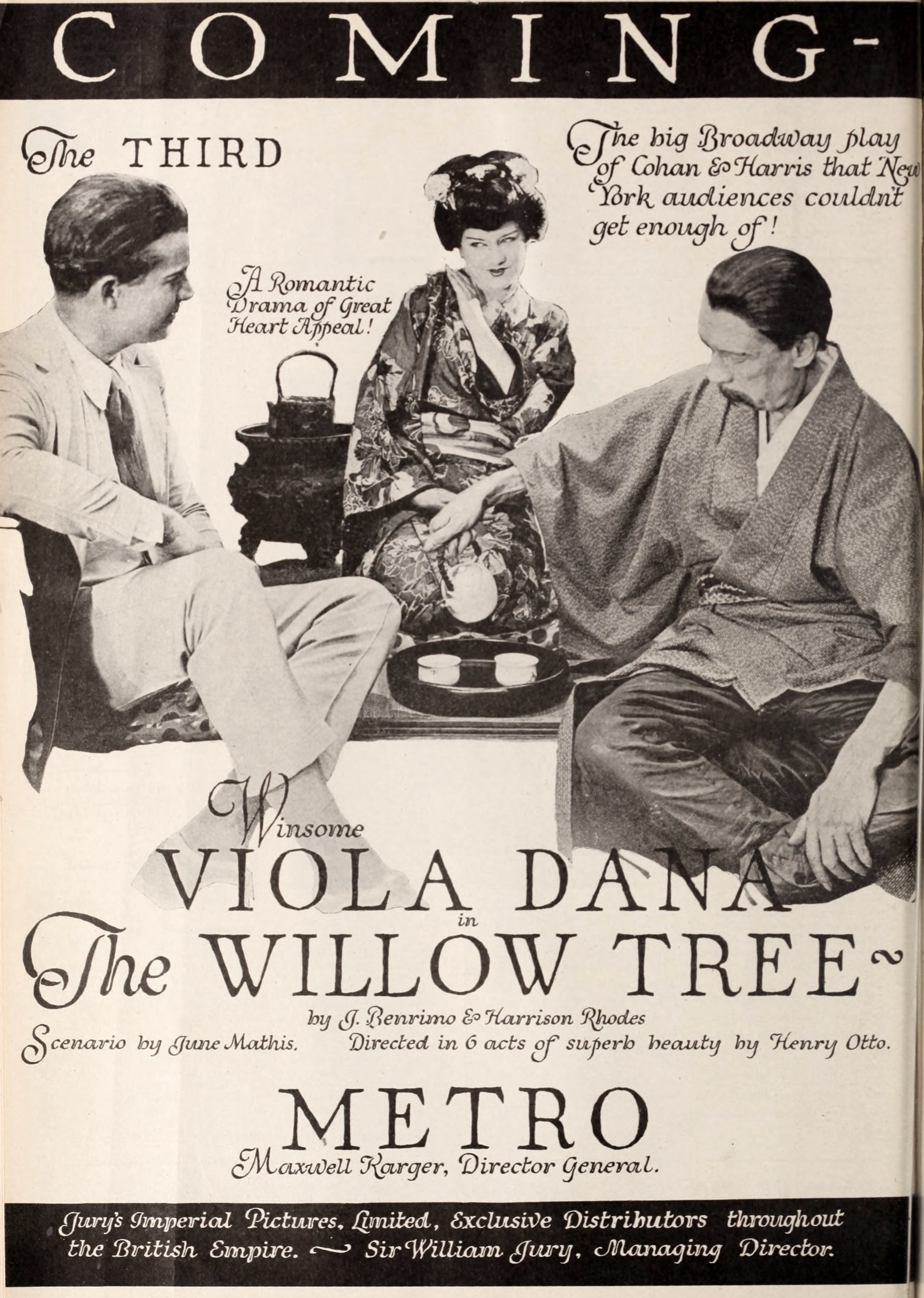
- Advertisement for film
- Directed by: Henry Otto
- Written by: June Mathis (adaptation, scenario)
- Based on: The Willow Tree by J. H. Benrimo and Harrison Rhodes
- Produced by: Screen Classics Incorporated; Maxwell Karger
- Starring: Viola Dana
- Cinematography: John Arnold
- Distributed by: Metro Pictures
- Release date: January 31, 1920
- Running time: 6 reels
- Country: United States
- Language: Silent (English intertitles)

The Willow Tree is a surviving 1920 American silent film directed by Henry Otto and distributed by Metro Pictures. The film is based on a Broadway play, The Willow Tree, by J. H. Benrimo and Harrison Rhodes. Fay Bainter starred in the Broadway play in 1917. The film stars Viola Dana and is preserved in the George Eastman House Motion Picture Collection.

== Plot ==
As described in a film magazine, O-Riu (Dana), daughter of a Japanese image-maker, rebels at his command that she marry a wealthy merchant in order to provide funds for her brother to attend an American college. Due to a coincidence, her flight is misinterpreted as a suicide, and her father sells to an Englishman living in the neighborhood his most prized image. Seeking refuge, O-Riu poses as the image and then "comes to life" apparently by magic. The Englishman falls in love with her and will not answer his country's call to arms until she has apparently disappeared. While he is away for four years, she lives at his home. When he returns after the war, they find happiness. The film has a parallel story concerning Japanese legends.

== Cast ==
- Viola Dana as O-Riu
- Edward Connelly as Tomotada
- Pell Trenton as Ned Hamilton
- Harry Dunkinson as Jeoffrey Fuller
- Alice Wilson as Mary Fuller
- Frank Tokunaga as John Charles Goto
- Togo Yamamoto as Itomudo
- George Kuwa as Kimura
- Tom Ricketts as Priest
- Yutaka Abe as Nogo
