= Charles Frederic Goss =

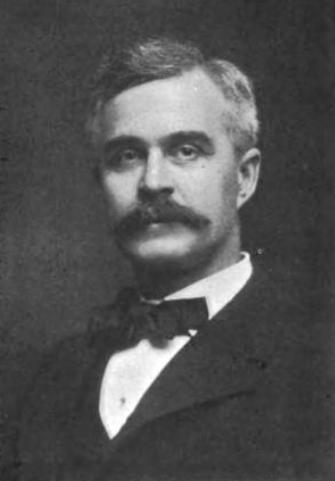
- c. 1900
- Born: June 14, 1852; Meridian, New York
- Died: May 7, 1930 (aged 77); Cincinnati, Ohio
- Resting place: Spring Grove Cemetery

Charles Frederic Goss (June 14, 1852 - May 7, 1930) was an American clergyman and author. His 1900 novel The Redemption of David Corson was a best selling book of that year. He also edited and partly authored a series of volumes on the history of Cincinnati.

Goss was born in Meridian, New York on June 14, 1852. He graduated from Hamilton College in New York in 1873 (he also later received a Doctor of Divinity degree from there in 1898), and from the Auburn Theological Seminary in 1876. He married Rosa E. Houghton in 1876 and was ordained as a Presbyterian minister. After serving in churches in Texas, New York, Pennsylvania, and Chicago (at Moody Church), he became pastor of Avondale Presbyterian Church in Cincinnati in 1894. Popular columns that Goss wrote for the Cincinnati Commercial Tribune as The Optimist were published as a book of the same name in 1897, and his writing career grew from there.

In January 1906, a play based on Corson written by Charlotte Blair Parker debuted on Broadway, and ran for 16 performances. In 1914, the book was made into a silent film.

A 2012 episode of the HBO television drama Boardwalk Empire featured a character reading The Redemption of David Corson.
