= Marjorie Wood =

British actress (1882–1955)

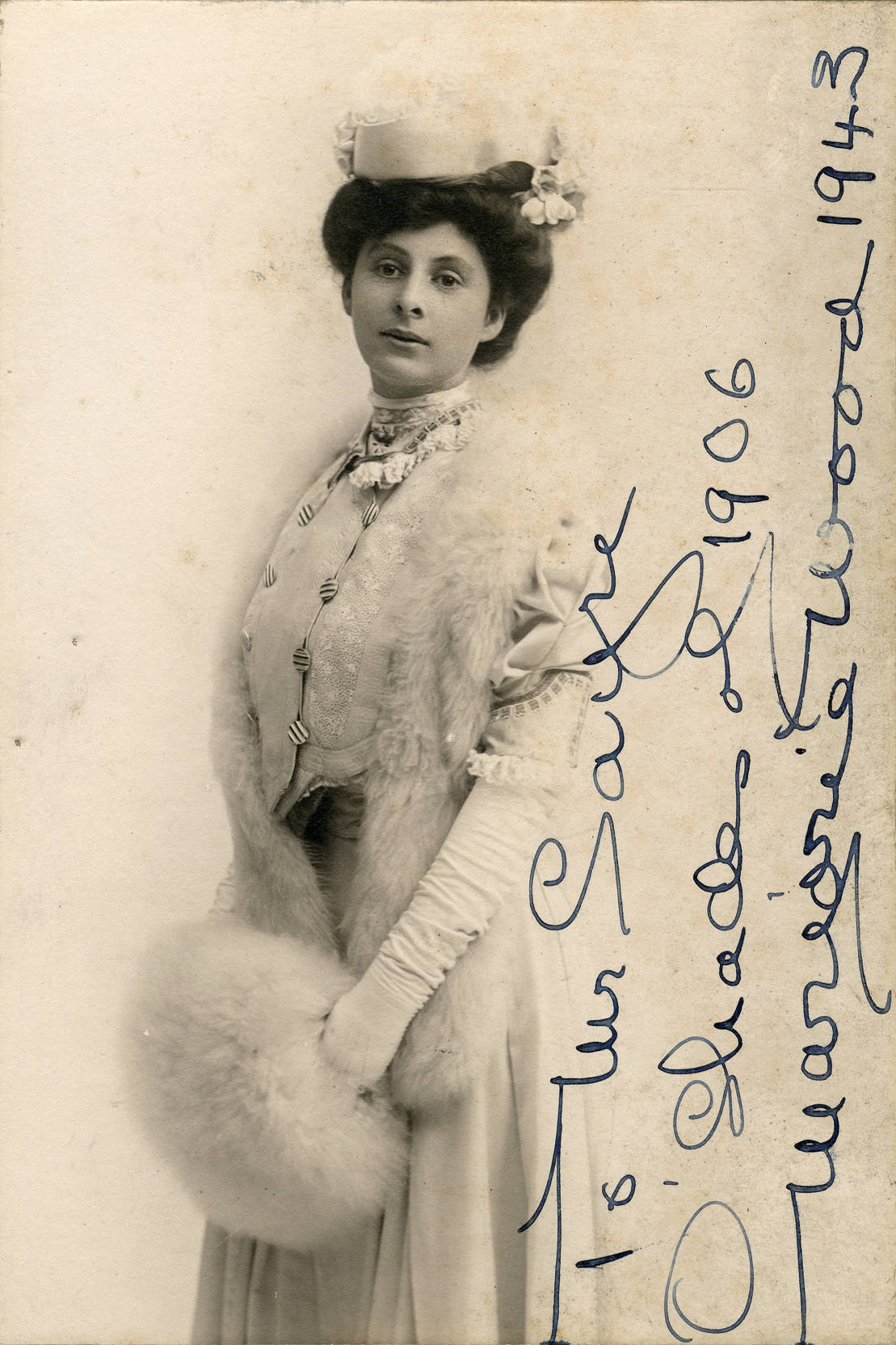
- Wood in 1912
- Born: 5 September 1882; London, England, UK
- Died: 9 November 1955 (aged 73); Hollywood, California, U.S.
- Occupation: Actress
- Years active: 1907–1954
- Spouse: John J. Gleason (m. 1910)

Marjorie Wood (5 September 1882 – 9 November 1955) was a British-born American actress on stage and in film.

== Early life ==
Marjorie Wood was born in Dublin (some sources give her birthplace as London ) on 5 September 1882.

== Career ==
Wood's stage career included parts in Strongheart (1904), Mary Jane's Pa (1908), The Call of the North (1908), The Third Party (1914), Yes or No (1918), Madame Pierre (1922), Yellow (1926), The Good Earth (1933), and Chu Chin Chow (1919-1921), "an Oriental extravaganza". When she played a telephone operator in The Woman (1912), she was invited to visit a large telephone exchange in Chicago, to meet women who did that job in real life.

In films, Wood appeared, usually in small roles, in The Women (1939), Pride and Prejudice (1940), Down in San Diego (1941), Anchors Aweigh (1945), Behind City Lights (1945), Adventure (1945), Boys' Ranch (1946), Adam's Rib (1949), Annie Get Your Gun (1950), Caged (1950), A Life of Her Own (1950), The Company She Keeps (1951), and Seven Brides for Seven Brothers (1954).

Marjorie Wood was a director of George M. Cohan's Actors' Fidelity League, which was organized in opposition to Actors' Equity Association.

== Personal life ==
By 1910 she was married to John J. Gleason. Five years later, Wood explained that she enjoyed the acting life because it made marriage optional: "With the ability to earn money and take care of ourselves, we don't have to stay tied to a husband we detest, just because we need someone to support us."

Marjorie Wood died in California in 1955, aged 73 years.

== Filmography ==
Year	Title	Role	Notes
1917	National Red Cross Pageant	Queen - English episode	
1939	Made for Each Other	Nurse	Uncredited
1939	Never Say Die	Hotel Guest	Uncredited
1939	They Shall Have Music	Betty's Mother	Uncredited
1939	The Women	Sadie - Old Maid in Powder Room	Uncredited
1940	Pride and Prejudice	Lady Lucas	
1941	Down in San Diego	Mrs. Burnette	Uncredited
1941	Look Who's Laughing	Mrs. Collins	Uncredited
1942	Klondike Fury	Ellen	
1942	Saboteur	Farmer's Wife	Uncredited
1943	The More the Merrier	Snippish Woman	Uncredited
1944	Mrs. Parkington	Woman	Uncredited
1944	The Thin Man Goes Home	Mother in Montage	Uncredited
1945	Anchors Aweigh	USO Mother	Uncredited
1945	Adventure	Nurse	Uncredited
1945	Behind City Lights		
1946	Boys' Ranch	Mrs. Johnstone	Uncredited
1947	Nightmare Alley	Mrs. Prescott / Mrs. S.P. at Spode Room	Uncredited
1948	Joan of Arc	Townswoman	Uncredited
1948	That Wonderful Urge	Woman	Uncredited
1949	Adam's Rib	Mrs. Marcasson	Uncredited
1950	Annie Get Your Gun	Constance	Uncredited
1950	Caged	Matron	Uncredited
1950	A Life of Her Own	Desk Clerk	Uncredited
1950	Two Weeks with Love	Mrs. Stresemann	Uncredited
1951	The Company She Keeps	Mrs. Haley	
1951	Excuse My Dust	Mrs. Cyrus Random Sr.	
1951	Show Boat	Landlady	Uncredited
1951	Texas Carnival	Mrs. Gaytes	
1953	I Love Melvin	Mrs. Wermbacher	Uncredited
1953	Sweethearts on Parade	Wardrobe Woman	
1953	Give a Girl a Break	Mme. Cerette	Uncredited
1954	Seven Brides for Seven Brothers	Mrs. Bixby	
1955	Many Rivers to Cross	Mrs. Emmett	Uncredited, (final film role)
