= Joseph R. Grismer =

American stage actor (1849–1922)

Joseph Rhode Grismer
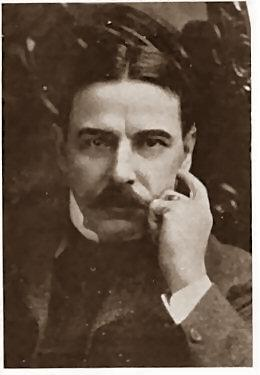
- Photograph of Joseph R. Grismer from Who’s Who on the Stage, 1906
- Born: Joseph Rhode Grismer; November 4, 1849; Albany, New York, USA
- Died: March 3, 1922 (aged 72); New York, New York, USA
- Occupations: Actor, Director, Playwright and Producer
- Spouse(s): Phoebe Davies; Olive Chamberlain

Joseph Rhode Grismer (November 4, 1849 – 1922) was an American stage actor, playwright, and theatrical director and producer. He was probably best remembered for his play The New South and for his revision of the Charlotte Blair Parker play Way Down East.

== Early life ==
Joseph Rhode Grismer was born in Albany, New York, on November 4, 1849, the middle of three girls and two boys raised by Irish immigrants, Christopher and Bridget Grismer. According to later records his birth parents may have been Valentine Grismer and Adelaide Huda. In his youth Grismer attended the Albany Boys Academy and upon graduation served with the 192nd New York Volunteer Regiment during the waning months of the American Civil War. After the war’s end Grismer returned to Albany where at some point he found his calling as a member of the Histrionic Amateur Dramatic Club.

== Life and career ==
Grismer made his professional stage debut in Albany around 1870 and by 1873 was playing principal roles at the Grand Opera House in Cincinnati. There Grismer appeared in hundreds of stock productions, some in support of Charlotte Cushman, Laura Keene, Edward Loomis Davenport, Edwin Adams, Lawrence Barrett, Lilian Adelaide Neilson, John Edward McCullough, Charles Albert Fechter, and Charles James Mathews.

Grismer relocated to San Francisco in 1877 where for several seasons he played leading roles at the Grand Opera House, and later the California Theatre and the Baldwin Theatre. At the latter he met and fell in love with Phoebe Davies, a young actress from Wales who had come to prominence at the Baldwin playing Hortense in a production of Dickens’ Bleak House. They married in San Francisco on June 1, 1882, and not long afterward formed their own company of stock players known as the Grismer-Davies Organization and began playing theaters throughout California and eventually across the Western States and Provinces of North America.

During this time Grismer wrote and performed in Monte Cristo, an adaptation of the Alexandre Dumas story The Count of Monte Cristo, and Called Back from the book by Hugh Conway. Other plays performed by the Grismer-Davies Organization would include Editha’s Burglar by Frances Hodgson Burnett; The Midnight Bell, a play by Charles Hale Hoyt that would later help launch the career of Maude Adams; the Bartley Campbell play Fairfax; Lights and Shadows by Henry Leslie; the Frank Harvey Sr. play The World Against Her; The Tigress by Ramsey Morris; The Long Strike by Dion Boucicault; Lester Wallack's Rosedale; another Boucicault play, The Streets of New York, with Grismer and Davies playing the principal roles, Tom Badger and Alida Bloodgood; Enoch Arden, from the poem by Alfred Lord Tennyson; The Wages of Sin, a morality story by Frank Harvey Sr.; and The Calthorpe Case, a melodrama by Arthur Goodrich.

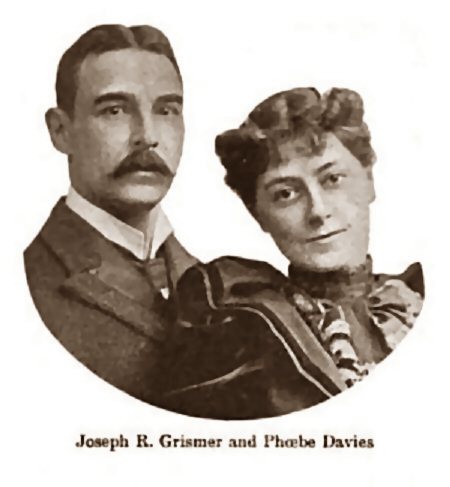
The History of the Boston Theatre, 1854–1901, 1908

In 1893 Grismer and Davies began what would turn out to be a long tour of the major cities of the Eastern United States as Captain Harry Ford and Georgia Gwynne in his original play, The New South, a melodrama written with Clay M. Greene about the American South a generation after the close of the Civil War. The New South was adapted for film in 1916 with Carlyle Blackwell and Ethel Clayton taking the roles of Ford and Gwynne. The couple next appeared together in the Sutton Vane Sr. play, Humanity, as Lt. Bevis Cranbourne and Alma Dunbar, which opened in New York at the Fourteenth Street Theatre on February 4, 1895.

Later Grismer, with actor turned producer William A. Brady, a former member of his company in California, purchased the rights to Lottie Blair Parker’s Way Down East, a pastoral play about country life in New England. With Grismer’s elaborations and with Davies playing the lead role Anna Moore opposite Howard Kyle as David Bartlett, Way Down East debuted on September 3, 1897, at Providence Rhode Island and the following month made its New York premier at the Manhattan Theatre. Way Down East at first received a lukewarm reception, but slowly began to gain momentum as it was performed in cities across the country. Over a run that lasted nearly ten seasons, it was estimated that the play had earned the two around a million dollars, with Grismer’s share placed in the neighborhood of three hundred and fifty thousand dollars. Way Down East, which remained popular with the public for many years, was later novelized by Grismer and, on four occasions between 1908 and 1935, produced as a motion picture.

Grismer and Brady would go on to produce a number of Broadway plays together over the years before his retirement at around the age of sixty. Their most successful Broadway production during this period was the 1908/09 play A Gentleman from Mississippi by Harrison Rhodes and Thomas A. Wise, which ran for 407 performances at the Bijou Theatre. In 1899 Grismer wrote and co-produced Manicure that he adapted from the original French play by André Sylvane and Louis Artus.

During his later years Grismer served as a director for the Commercial Trust Company and treasurer of the Gulf Fisheries Company. He was a president of the Actors' Order of Friendship and vice-president of the Actors' Fund of America and a member of The Players, American Dramatists' Club, Green Room Club, Bohemian Club, the Manhasset Bay and Larchmont Yacht clubs. Grismer served two terms as shepherd of the Lambs Theatrical Club. Though considered fractious by some, his tenures, 1911–1913 and 1917–1918, oversaw a doubling in the size of the clubhouse. Grismer remained a member of the Council of the Lambs Club until the end of his life.

== Death ==
Phoebe Davies died at their home in Larchmont, New York on December 4, 1912, after suffering a year-long illness. Joseph Grismer died nearly ten years later, a victim of a car-pedestrian crash as he was crossing Broadway at 106th Street in Manhattan. He was survived by Olive Chamberlain Grismer, his wife for seven or eight years, their daughter Olive, and son Conrad, from his first marriage.
