= Charlotte Blair Parker =

American dramatist (1858–1937)

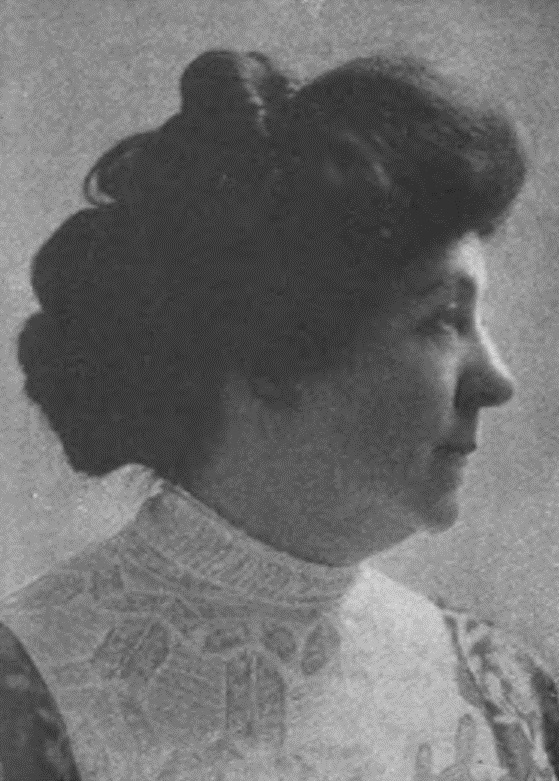
- Born: Charlotte Blair c. 1858; Oswego, New York, U.S.
- Died: January 5, 1937 (aged 78); Great Neck, New York, U.S.
- Other name: Lottie Blair Parker
- Occupations: Actor, author, playwright
- Spouse: Harry Doel Parker

Charlotte Blair Parker (1858 – January 5, 1937) was an American playwright and actress in the late 19th and early 20th centuries. She began her theatrical career as an actress, eventually playing opposite John Edward McCullough, Mary Anderson, and Dion Boucicault. Writing under the pen name Lottie Blair Parker, she wrote about a dozen produced plays but is remembered most for three popular stage plays produced between 1897 and 1906: Way Down East, Under Southern Skies and The Redemption of David Corson. Of the three, Way Down East, produced in 1898, was the most successful, proving to be one of the most popular American plays of its time, steadily performed for two decades.

== Early years ==
Born 1858, in Oswego, New York, Charlotte Blair Parker was the daughter of George and Emily Hitchcock Blair.

== Career ==
Charlotte "Lottie" Blair Parker's theatrical career started as an actress, studying for the stage under the noted Shakespearian actor, Wyzeman Marshall in Boston. She performed with the stock company of the Boston Theatre, and later toured with such major figures as the Czech tragic actress Mme. Janauschek and American actor-producer of poetic drama Lawrence Barrett. She married a theatrical manager, Harry D. Parker. She turned to playwriting when White Roses, a one-act play she submitted to a New York Herald contest in 1892, received honorable mention.

=== Way Down East ===
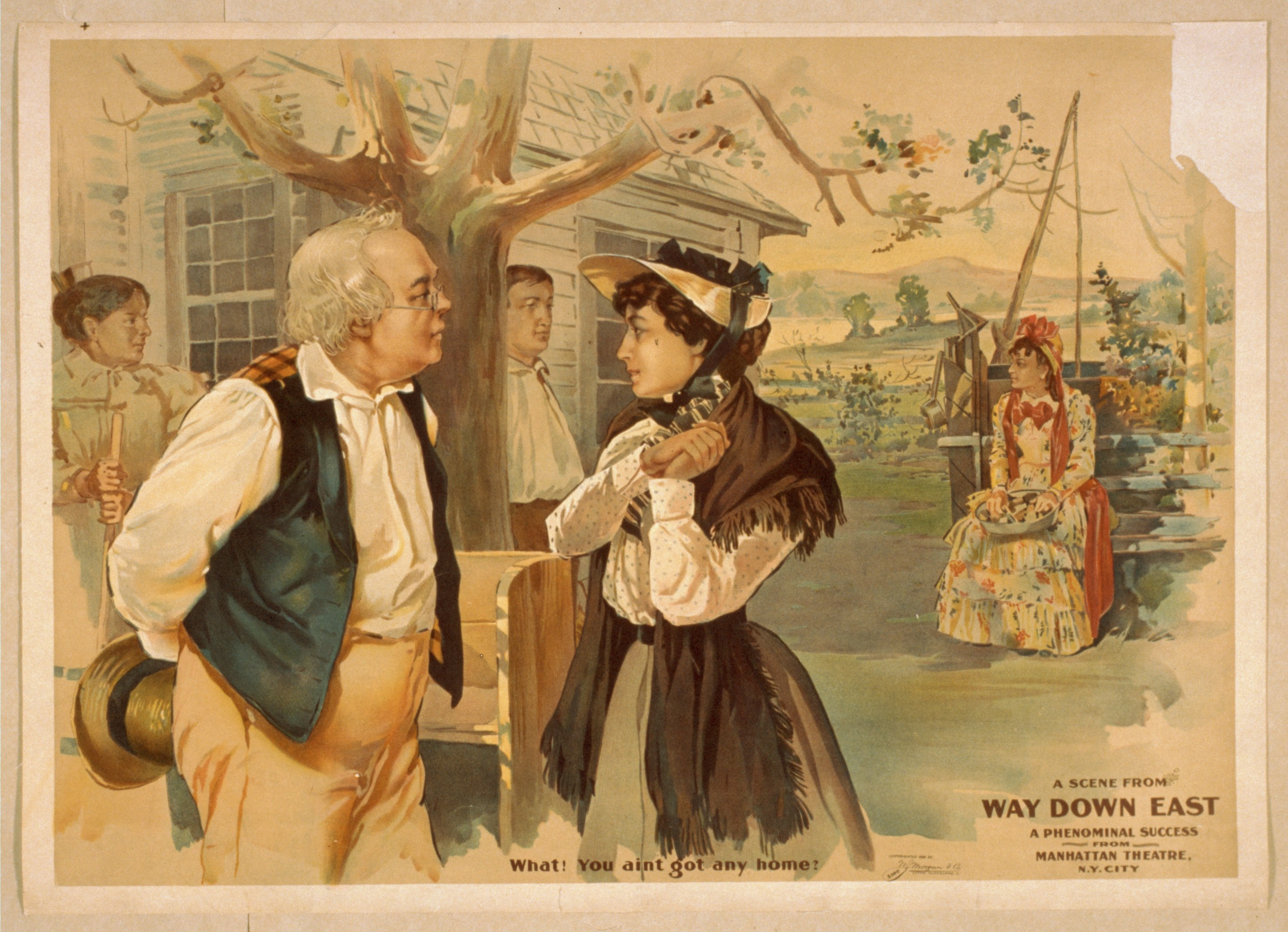
Poster for the Broadway production of Way Down East (1898)

In 1897, at the age of 39, Parker penned her most popular full-length play, titled Way Down East. It was a sentimental melodrama about the travails of a seduced woman, Anna Moore, who is cast out by those who learn her story. After being seduced and losing the child of that liaison, Anna Moore (Phoebe Davies) wanders despondently until she finds refuge as a servant in the New England farm of Squire Bartlett (played by Odell Williams). Ignorant of her past, the Bartletts embrace her as part of their household. But when Squire Bartlett learns her history he drives her from his home in the midst of a raging snowstorm. Anna loses her way and nearly dies before she is rescued by the Bartletts' son, David (played by Howard Kyle). He has come to love her and finally persuades his parents that she is worthy to be his wife.

Way Down East premiered at the Manhattan Theatre in 1898 where it enjoyed 152 performances. It was later revised by Joseph R. Grismer, whose wife, Phoebe Davies, played the leading role of Anna Moore in the original production and in later revivals in 1903 and 1905. Davis would go on to play the role for more than 4,000 performances.

In 1920 D. W. Griffith paid $175,000 for screen rights to the melodrama, which was by then considered dated. His film version was a popular success and an artistic triumph, largely because of the sweetly expressive face of Lillian Gish.

Critics saw a strong resemblance between Way Down East and Steele MacKaye's 1880 melodrama Hazel Kirke, in which Parker had once played the title role. Both plays feature an innocent girl who loves a man above her station in life and is duped by a sham marriage ceremony. Upon her learning of her dishonor, Hazel Kirke throws herself into the mill race. In Way Down East, Anna Moore is sent out into a New England blizzard. In both plays, the heroine is rescued at the last minute and a reconciliation is effected. The originality of Parker's treatment lies in her use of "Down East" atmosphere and such comic characters as Hi Holler, Martha Perkins, and Reuben Whipple.

=== Under Southern Skies ===
Under Southern Skies was set in Louisiana in 1875. It opened November 12, 1901, with Grace George in the leading role. True to its reviewer's prediction, the play was a popular success with "that large class of playgoers who like their color on thick without too much delicacy of shading, and with no great subtlety in the handling." This criticism was intended metaphorically, but it might also be noted that several roles were performed in black-face. As in Way Down East, the heroine is caught between a false-hearted cad and an honorable young suitor; again, virtue triumphs. The work contained music by composer Lee Orean Smith.

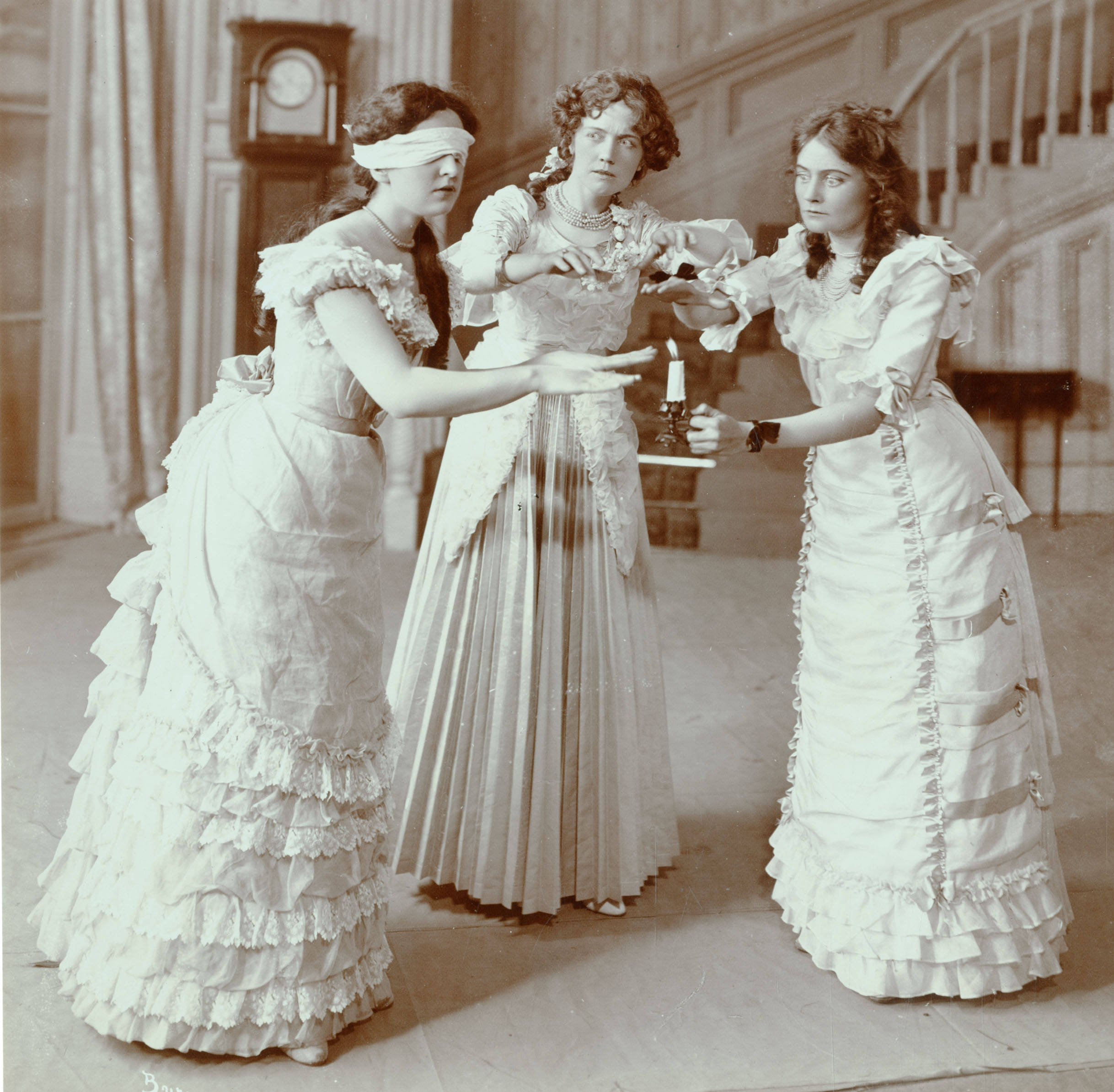
1906 production of "Under Southern Skies"

A film version, directed by Lucius Henderson and starring Mary Fuller, was produced and released by the Universal Film Manufacturing Company in 1915.

=== The Redemption of David Corson ===
Parker's third full-length play to reach Broadway was The Redemption of David Corson, based upon a novel of the same title by Charles Frederic Goss. It premiered January 8, 1906, but had a short life of only 16 performances. In 1909, Parker focused on the New England village milieu, Yankee characters, and rustic dialect, when she turned the novel Homespun: A Story of Some New England Folk into a stage play. She used the formula of her stage melodramas—a conflict between a rich scoundrel and a poor-but-honest young man. A review of Homespun in The New York Times (14 Aug. 1909) sums up her characteristic manner: "It is as moral as a Sunday school tale, and at the end pleases if not surprises the reader by the tableau of virtue triumphant and vice in the dust."

== Death ==
Charlotte Blair Parker died January 5, 1937, in Great Neck, New York.

== Chronology of theatrical productions ==
Productions	Genre	Contribution by Lottie B. Parker	Dates of productions
Way Down East	Original Broadway play, melodrama	Written by Parker, revised by Joseph R. Grismer.	February 7 - June 1898 (Manhattan Theatre, 152 performances)
Under Southern Skies	Original Broadway play, melodrama	Written by Parker, produced by William A. Brady.	November 12, 1901 - January, 1902 (Theatre Republic, 71 Performances)
For Home and Honor	Play, American Theatre	Written by Parker	premiered January 26, 1903
Lights of Home	Play, Melodrama, Original, Broadway	Written by Parker.	November 2, 1903 - ? (Haverly's 14th Street Theatre)
Way Down East	Broadway play, melodrama, revival	Written by Parker, revised by Joseph R. Grismer	December 14, 1903 - ? (Academy of Music, 48 performances)
Way Down East	Broadway play, melodrama, revival	Written by Parker, revised by Joseph R. Grismer.	August 21 - October 1905 (Academy of Music, 64 performances)
The Redemption of David Corson	Broadway play, melodrama, adaptation	Written by Parker, from the novel by Rev. Charles Frederic Goss	January 8 - 19, 1906 (Majestic Theatre, 16 performances)
