= Phoebe Davies =

American actress

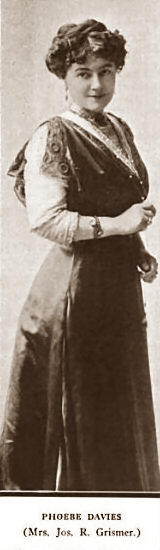
- Photograph from the New York Star, February, 1909
- Born: February 7, 1864; Cardigan, Wales, UK
- Died: December 4, 1912 (aged 48); Larchmont, New York, US
- Other name: Phoebe Davies Grismer
- Occupation: Stage Actress
- Spouse: Joseph R. Grismer

Phoebe Davies (February 7, 1864 – December 4, 1912) was a Welsh-born American stage actress who starred in over 4,000 performances of the Lottie Blair Parker play, Way Down East.

== Early life ==
Phoebe Davies was born in Cardigan, Wales, the daughter of David and Annie (née Griffiths) Davies. Her father, who was originally drawn to California by the Gold Rush of 1849, returned with his family in the early 1870s to work for the Pacific Mail Steamship Company. Her father later joined the Lighthouse Service where he would rise to captain the lighthouse tender Madroño. While still in school Davies won an audition with David Belasco, then stage manager of the Baldwin Theatre Stock Company in San Francisco, that led to an offer to play a part in their next production. An illness prevented her from taking the role that only postponed her professional stage début a short while later as a member of the Oakland California Stock Company.

== San Francisco ==
She first appeared in a play by a local California playwright (Cipricio or Ciprico) entitled Adolph Chalet in which her performance as Marie, a minor role, went largely unnoticed in a cast that included Jeffreys Lewis, Osmond Tearle and Gerard Eyre. Later in the season she won praise for her depiction of Nadia in a dramatization of the Jules Verne novel Michael Strogoff.

Around 1882 Davies joined the Baldwin Theatre Stock Company where she was given the opportunity to support the great Italian actor Ernesto Rossi as Regan and the Player Queen in productions of Shakespeare's King Lear and Hamlet and in the role Lady Angela in Charles Francis Coghlan's The Royal Box, his adaption of the Alexandre Dumas play Kean. That same season William Edward Sheridan, a well known actor of the day, cast her as Prince Arthur to his Baldwin in King John, Lady Ann in Richard III and the title role in Romeo and Juliet opposite his Mercutio. During the period she also appeared with the seventy-one-year-old veteran actor Charles R. Thorne as Maritana in an adaption of the Jules Massenet Opéra comique, Don César de Bazan and as Hortense to Jennie Lee's Little Jo in Dickens's Bleak House.

On June 7, 1882 Davies married in San Francisco Joseph R. Grismer, then a lead actor at the Baldwin Theatre. In September, 1883 the two joined a company of actors from the Baldwin in a tour that was timed to correspond with various county fairs throughout California. Under the direction of Sam O. Mott the troupe performed a series of plays including Chispa by the California playwright, Clay M. Greene. Davies portrayal of the title role garnered her an offer by one theatrical producer to make her a star on the New York stage, an opportunity the not yet twenty-year-old actress felt not prepared to accept. Later that year the couple formed the Grismer-Davies Organization and began playing theaters throughout California and eventually on tours that encompassed the Western States and Provinces of North America.

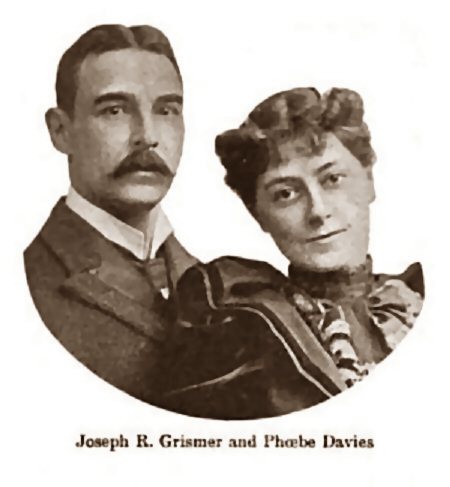
The History of the Boston Theatre, 1854-1901; 1908

During this time Davies played Mercedes in Monte Cristo from the Alexandre Dumas story The Count of Monte Cristo and Pauline in Called Back from the book by Hugh Conway, both plays written for the stage by Grismer. Other plays performed by the Grismer-Davies Organization would include Editha’s Burglar by Frances Hodgson Burnett; The Midnight Bell, a play by Charles Hale Hoyt that would later help launch the career of Maude Adams; the Bartley Campbell play Fairfax; Lights and Shadows by Henry Leslie; the Frank Harvey, Sr. play, The World Against Her; The Tigress by Ramsey Morris; The Long Strike by Dion Boucicault; Lester Wallack's Rosedale; another Boucicault play, The Streets of New York, with Grismer and Davies playing the principal roles, Tom Badger and Alida Bloodgood; Enoch Arden, from the poem by Alfred Lord Tennyson; The Wages of Sin, a morality story by Frank Harvey, Sr.; and The Calthorpe Case, a melodrama by Arthur Goodrich.

On Sunday, September 12, 1892, their son Conrad Valentine Grismer became the first baby to be baptized in the baptismal font writer Clay M. Greene had donated to St. John's Episcopal Church (15th and Julian Avenue) in San Francisco.

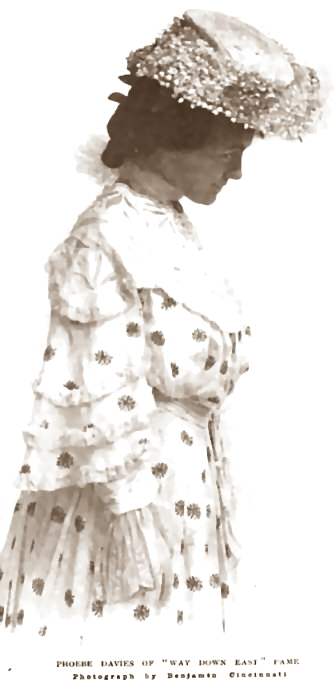
Phoebe Davies National Magazine, 1906

== New York ==
In 1893 Grismer and Davies began what would turn out to be a long tour of the major cities of the Eastern United States as Captain Harry Ford and Georgia Gwynne in his original play The New South, a melodrama written with Clay M. Greene about the American South a generation after the close of the Civil War. The New South was adapted for film in 1916 with Carlyle Blackwell and Ethel Clayton taking the roles of Ford and Gwynne. The couple next appeared together in the Sutton Vane, Sr. play, Humanity, as Lt. Bevis Cranbourne and Alma Dunbar, which opened in New York at the Fourteenth Street Theatre on February 4, 1895.

Soon afterwards her husband along with actor William A. Brady, a former member of their company in California, purchased the rights to Lottie Blair Parker's Way Down East, a pastoral play about country life in New England. With Grismer's elaborations and Davies in the lead role as Anna Moore opposite Howard Kyle as David Bartlett, Way Down East debuted on September 3, 1897 at Providence Rhode Island and the following month made its New York premier at the Manhattan Theatre. Way Down East, at first received a lukewarm reception, but slowly began to gain momentum as it was performed in cities across the country. Over a run the lasted nearly ten seasons with some 4,000 performances, it was estimated that the play netted around a million dollars, with her husband's share placed in the neighborhood of three hundred and fifty thousand dollars. Way Down East, which remained popular with the public for many years, was on four occasions between 1908 and 1935 produced as a motion picture. Davies continued to tour with the Way Down East into 1909 and had planned later in the year to appear opposite Arnold Daly in Algernon Boyesen's adaptation of Paul Hervieu's's four-act play Know Thyself, before falling seriously ill.

Phoebe Davies died after an extended illness on December 4, 1912, aged 48, at her residence in Larchmont, New York. She was survived by her husband and son.
