= Howard Kyle =

American actor

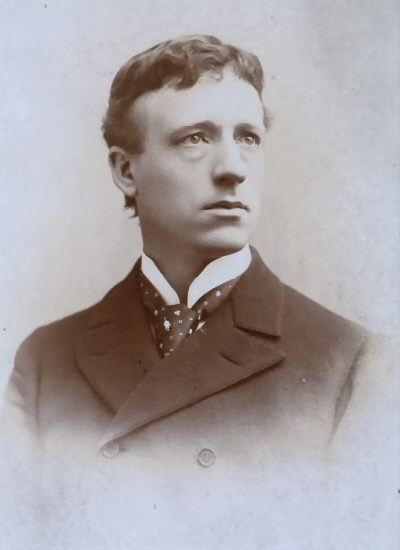
- New York Public Library
- Born: Howard Anderson Vandergrift; April 22, 1861; Shullsburg, Wisconsin
- Died: December 1, 1950 (aged 89); New York, New York
- Occupation: Actor

Howard Kyle (April 22, 1861 – December 1, 1950) was an American stage and screen actor and lecturer active for over 50 years. He was a founding member and one-time recording-secretary of Actors' Equity and a sixty-year member of The Players Club. Kyle was perhaps best remembered for his starring roles in the turn of the century plays Way Down East, Nathan Hale and John Ermine of the Yellowstone.

== Early life ==
Born Howard Anderson Vandergrift at Shullsburg, Wisconsin, Kyle was the son of Captain Howard Vandergrift, a veteran of the Mexican–American War who later served during the American Civil War as the first commander of the Shullsburg Light Guard, later known as Company I, Third Regiment Wisconsin Volunteers. Kyle was later raised in Mt. Carroll, Illinois where his father may have been a proprietor of H. & C. Vandergrift, a general merchandising store. Kyle attended the Mt. Carroll Union School, where he studied Latin and philosophy and was named valedictorian of the 1879 graduating class. At home Kyle received private instructions in French and literature and after high school studied law for two years. By his early teens Kyle had won an oration competition and acquired a keen interest in the works of William Shakespeare. He began his acting career in amateur theatre as Kyle Vandergrift and made his professional stage debut at the age of 23 under the name Howard Kyle.

== Career ==
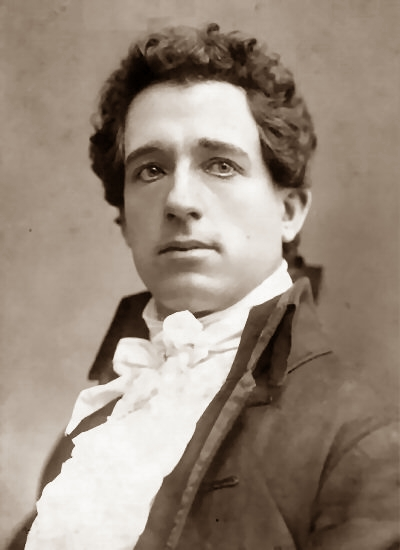
Howard Kyle as Nathan Hale

Kyle's debuted as Guildenstern and the Second Grave Digger in Shakespeare's Hamlet at the Meyer's Opera House in Janesville, Wisconsin, on September 10, 1884. He spent the following twelve seasons in tours with a number of large classical repertory companies and made his first appearance in New York in 1887 at the Windsor Theatre as Lucius in the James Sheridan Knowles play Virginius. During the mid-1890s Kyle played leading man roles with stock companies in Salt Lake City, Pittsburg and San Francisco. In late 1897 Kyle began a two-year run at the Manhattan Theatre and national tour of the Grismer and Parker pastoral play Way Down East, playing David Bartlett to Phoebe Davies' Anna Moore. During the season of 1900/01 he played the title role in a successful tour of the Clyde Fitch romantic drama Nathan Hale, with co-star Nanette Comstock as Alice Adams. Kyle was Sir Jasper Thorndyke, the lead character in a 1904 tour of Louis Parker's four-act comedy, Rosemary, and the next year played the title role in a tour of Louis Shipman's adaptation of the Frederic Remington western, John Ermine of the Yellowstone. Kyle later toured with Rose Coghlan's company playing Henry Beauclerc to Coghlan's Countess Zicka in the Victorien Sardou play Diplomacy.

Kyle played Wolfgang Amadeus Mozart in Ivy Ashton Root's The Greater Love at Madison Square Theatre on March 19, 1906, and on September 30 of the next year, performed the title role in Henry Arthur Jones' The Evangelist at the Knickerbocker Theatre. In 1908 Kyle toured as Mr. Johnson in a vaudeville sketch entitled This Woman and That Man. At Maxine Elliott's Theatre on February 22, 1909 Kyle played Scarus in Antony and Cleopatra, and on November 6 played the same part in the first performance held at the recently built New Theatre. In 1910 Kyle played Manson, with Henry Miller's Associate Players in Charles Rann Kennedy's The Servant In the House, and that November 30 acted the part of Castor, with the Coburn Players in Electra, staged at the Hudson Theatre.

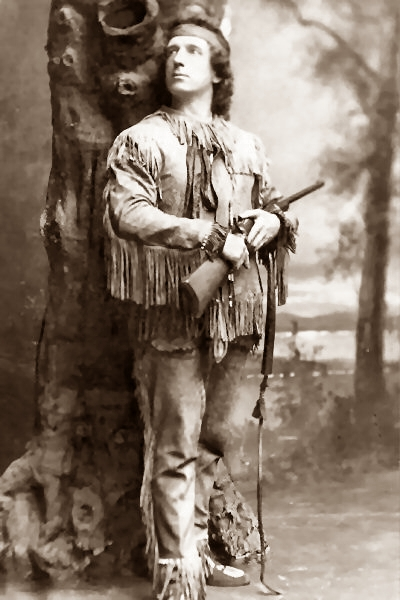
Howard Kyle as John Ermine of the Yellowstone

Kyle was "The Voice" in Mary Magdalene, produced at the New Theatre on December 5, 1910, and on January 19 of the next year he played Conrad Borinski at the Astor Theatre with Lena Ashwell in the C. M. S. McLellan play Judith Zaraine. Later in 1911 Kyle toured with the Coburn Players in classical repertory productions and in July of the following year with his own company played Malvolio in Shakespeare's comedy, Twelfth Night, at the Greek Theatre, Mt. Kisco, and the title role in Nathan the Wise at the campus of New York University.

Though Kyle would return to the stage many times over the following two decades, his last major Broadway role was probably Simeon in Louis Parker's 1913 pageant play, Joseph and His Brethren, which ran at the Century Theatre for 124 performances. Over his career Kyle often appeared on the lecture circuit giving talks on subjects relating to the theatre. He performed in a handful of silent films between 1912 and 1918, such as Don’t Pinch My Pup (1912) with Riley Chamberlin; A Star Reborn (1912) with Florence La Badie; National Red Cross Pageant (1917) with Ethel Barrymore; The Purple Lily (1918) with Frank Mayo and Kitty Gordon; and Wild Honey (1918) with Frank Mills and Doris Kenyon.

== Actors' Equity ==
Kyle was a founding member of the Actors' Equity Association and served as their first recording secretary. He resigned in 1919 over a schism involving the direction the organization was going after the members voted to join the American Federation of Labor. Kyle later served as secretary to the Actors' Fidelity League, a rival organization headed by George M. Cohan.

== Marriage ==
Kyle married actress Amy Urcilla Hodges, a sister-in-law of the writer Louis Joseph Vance, at Fort Lee, New Jersey on June 28, 1915. They had met at the Playhouse Theatre the previous year during a production of the Harvey O'Higgins and Harriet Ford story, Polygamy, in which Kyle played the Profit to Hodges’ Charlotte Marini.

== Death ==
Kyle died aged 89, at a New York City nursing home on December 1, 1950. He was survived by his wife.

== Selected filmography ==
- National Red Cross Pageant (1917)
- The Purple Lily (1918)
- Wild Honey (1918)
