= Charles Fisher (actor) =

American stage actor and comedian (1816-1891)

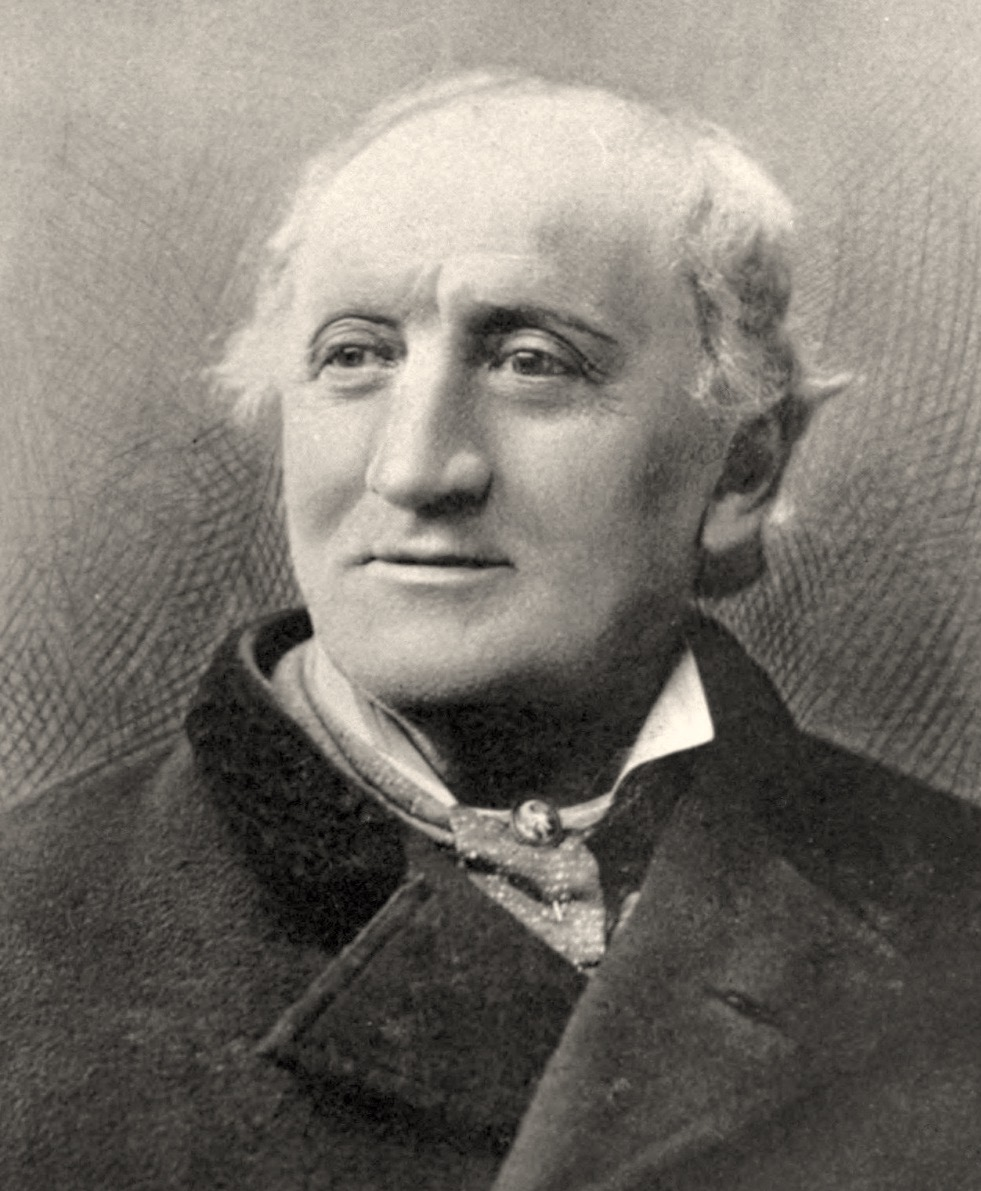
- Born: 1816; Suffolk, England
- Died: 11 June 1891 (aged 74–75); New York City, United States
- Occupations: Actor; comedian
- Spouse: Josephine H. Shaw (m. 1876)
- Parents: Charles Fisher; Jane Corby
- Relatives: David Fisher (I) (Grandfather); David Fisher (II) (Uncle); David Fisher (III) (Cousin)

Signature
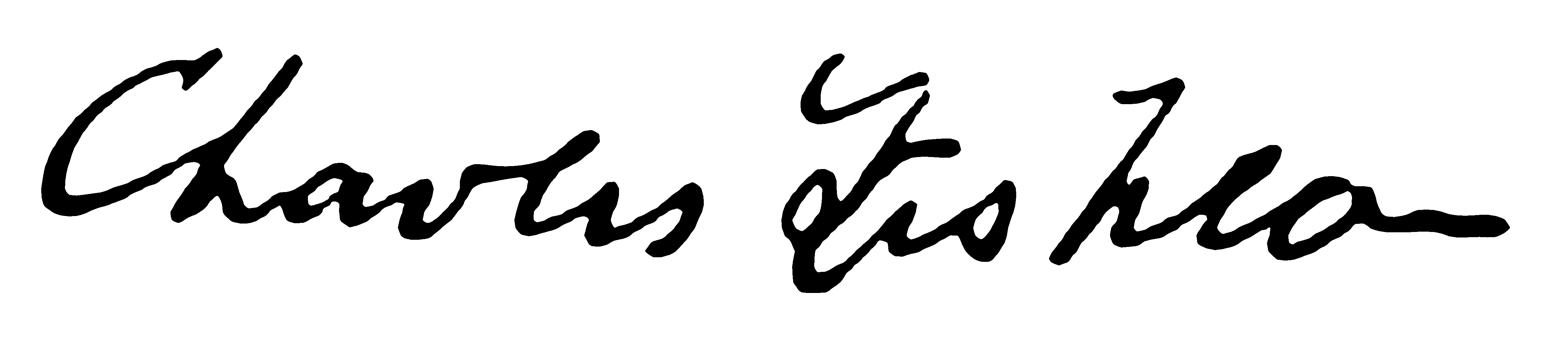

Charles Fisher (1816 – June 11, 1891) was an American stage actor and comedian. Born to a prolific theatrical family from Norfolk, England, Fisher went on to find success as an actor in different parts of England, and then from 1852 onwards in New York City where he worked as a highly regarded performer for almost 40 years in the companies of William E. Burton, Laura Keene, James William Walluck, and Augustin Daly.

Arguably his best-known parts were Triplet in Masks and Faces, Sir Peter Teazle in The School for Scandal, Jacques in As You Like It, and Graves in Money.

== Early life ==
Fisher was born in Suffolk, England to a family of actors and performers who ran a travelling theatre company, Norfolk and Suffolk Company of Comedians (1792-1844), established by Fisher's grandfather David Fisher (I). The family owned, managed and performed in 13 theatres across Norfolk and Suffolk, with family members forming the majority of the cast and crew.

His parents, Jane Corby and Charles Fisher (1792–1869), married in 1814 and went on to have three children, Julia (1815-1892), Charles, and Frederick (b. 1820). His mother was an actor with the family, and Charles Snr. was an instrumentalist who later took on the management of the company following the death of David Fisher (I). (Note: Some sources, such Charles Fisher's obituary in the New York Times erroneously state that he was the son – not nephew – of David Fisher (I).) Julia went on to be an actor, and Frederick a scenic painter.

Fisher's uncle David Fisher (II) (1788–1858), his cousin David Fisher (III) (1816–1887), and his nephew David Fisher (IV)(1845–1889) all went on to become successful actors on the national stage.

== Career ==
=== England ===
After working for the family, he made his London debut in 1844 at the Princess's Theatre, spending the next seven years working in different parts of England.

=== New York City ===
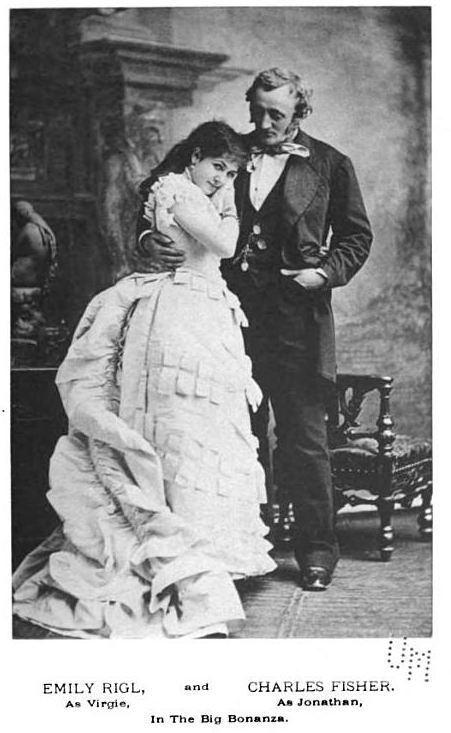
Fisher with actress Emily Rigl in The Big Bonanza, 1875

==== Chambers Street Theatre ====
In 1852 he moved to New York City to join the company of William E. Burton, Fisher was to succeed Lester Wallack as the "leading juvenile and light comedian" at the Chambers Street Theatre, where he worked until 1861. His New York debut was as Ferment in Thomas Morton's play The School of Reform at. In Burton's company he worked alongside Cornelius Ambrosius Logan, James William Wallack, Barney Williams, George Holland, Agnes Kelly Robertson, and William J. Florence.

1853 he performed one of his most notable parts as Triplet in Masks and Faces, which formed a basis for much of his subsequent fame.

In 1860 he starred as Kyrle Daly in the debut of Dion Boucicault's, The Colleen Bawn, alongside Laura Keene, Agnes Kelly Robertson, Dion Boucicault, and Madame Ponisi. He remained in Burtons company until 1861.

==== Broadway Theatre ====
In 1855 and 1856 he also performed at the Broadway Theatre, at the time the largest theatre in New York. Among the plays he performed as the Earl of Richmond in Richard III at the Broadway Theatre alongside E.L. Davenport, in the New York premiere of William Bayle Bernard's Leon, or The Iron Mask alongside Madame Ponisi. He also played the jester Pepe in George Boker's play Francesca Da Rimini, alongside Ponisi and Davenport. He also worked alongside Edwin Forrest and Julia Dean.

==== Laura Keenes company ====
In 1860 he worked in Laura Keene's company at the Olympic Theatre, where he played David Deans in Dion Boucicault's new play Jeanie Deans based on Sir Walter Scott's novel The Heart of Midlothian.

==== Wallack's Theatre ====
In 1861 he joined the company of James William Wallack at Wallack's Theatre until 1872. In 1863 he played Matthew Leigh in the original run of one of Wallack's most successful plays, Rosedale; or, the Rifle Ball. In 1868 he starred in The Lottery of Life as Mordie Solomons. In 1870 he played Colonel Crafton in Charles Gayler's Fritz, Our Cousin German in 1870.

==== Augustin Daly's company ====
In 1872 he joined Augustin Daly's company where he remained until his retirement in 1890 working on Daly's own plays, as well as classics such as Shakespeare. In 1875 he played Matthew Standish in Daly's Pique, the play was popular with audiences and financially successful but critical response varied from "highly laudatory puff pieces to accusations of excessive sentiment and irritating sensationalism". He also had success in the 1875 hit play The Big Bonanza.

It was at this time that in 1876 he married his second wife, the significantly younger Josephine H. Shaw (d.1907), stage name Josephine Boone, from Baltimore, who was a fellow actor in Daly's company.

His last appearance on stage before retiring was in 1890 at the Lyceum Theatre in London as Adam in As You Like It.

== Death and legacy ==
Fisher died at his home in New York City on 11 June 1891, aged 75, following a case of erysipelas earlier in the year. His obituary in The New York Times described him as

"a man of commanding presence, tall, erect, broad-shouldered. His voice, in his young days, was rich and strong. In his prime he invariably satisfied the eye exactly as the heroes of the romantic drama. In his later years he was seen to the best advantage in eccentric comedy parts. He was, throughout his career, however, a "good all-around actor", never approaching greatness, lacking the temperament and intellectual force needed in such a character as Falstaff, but a player of sound methods and good natural qualifications."

His "unostentatious" funeral in the Bronx and burial at Woodlawn Cemetery was attended by noted actors of the time including Joseph S. Jefferson, Maurice Barrymore, Daniel Howard Harkins and Charles Walter Couldock who served as pall bearers. He was survived by his second wife, the actress Josephine Boone Fisher.

His great-granddaughters were the actresses Blanche Ring, Frances Ring and Julie Ring who appeared on the Boston Museum Theatre stage as children. His great-grandson was Cyril Ring (1892-1967) a prolific character actor in Hollywood films.
