= David Fisher =

David Fisher may refer to:

== Film and theater ==
- David Fisher (I) (1760–1832), English theatre manager and actor
- David Fisher (II) (1788–1858), English actor and musician
- David Fisher (filmmaker) (born 1956), Israeli documentary film director
- David Fisher (writer) (1929–2018), British scriptwriter
- David Fisher (fl. since c. 1970s), film journal editor, Screen Digest#David Fisher
- David Andrew Fisher (fl. 1980s), film director and producer including Toy Soldiers
- David Dayan Fisher (fl. since c. 2000s), British actor
- David Nunn Fisher (1816–1887), actor and musician
- Walter David Fisher (1845–1889), comic actor and musician

== Politics ==
- David Fisher (politician) (1794–1886), American politician
- David Fisher (trade unionist) (1852–1912), New Zealand printer, trade unionist and public servant

== Other ==
- David Fisher (artist) (1946–2013), English artist and designer
- David Fisher (footballer) (born 2001), English footballer
- David Fisher (lawn bowls) (born 1956), British lawn bowler
- David Fisher (rugby union) (1871–1932), Scotland international rugby union player
- David C. Fisher (born 1943), American author, professor and pastor
- David Fisher (Six Feet Under), a fictional character in the television series Six Feet Under
- Dudu Fisher (born 1951), Israeli singer

== See also ==
- David Fischer (disambiguation)
