= David Nunn =

David Nunn may refer to:

- David A. Nunn (1833–1918), U.S. Representative from Tennessee
- David Nunn (actor) (1962–2012), British actor

== See also ==
- David Nunn Fisher (1816–1887), English actor and musician usually known as David Fisher
