= Barney Williams (actor) =

American actor

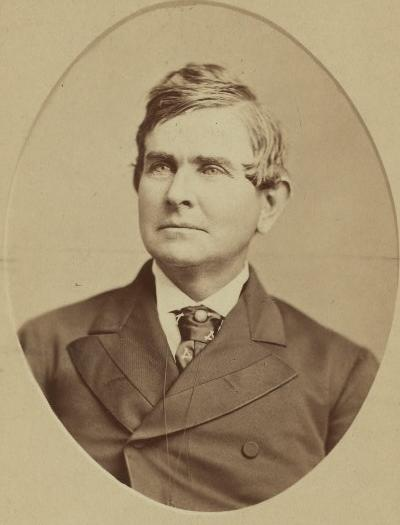
- Born: Bernard O’Flaherty; August 30, 1824; Cork, Ireland
- Died: April 25, 1876 (aged 51); New York City
- Occupations: Actor-Comedian, Irish Clog Dancer
- Spouse: Maria Pray

Barney Williams (August 20, 1824 – April 25, 1876) was an Irish-American actor-comedian popular during the mid decades of the 19th century. He was probably best remembered by audiences of the day for playing Ragged Pat in J. A. Amherst's drama Ireland as it is and the title role in Samuel Lover's comic opera Rory O'More. Throughout the greater part of his career he was billed along with his wife, the former Maria Pray, as Mr. and Mrs. Barney Williams.

When Benjamin H. Day founded the New York Sun in 1833, he employed Williams as his first, and for a time, only newsboy.

== Biography ==
Bernard O'Flaherty was born in 1824 at Cork, Ireland, to Michael and Mary O’Flaherty. In 1831 his family immigrated to America where his father would become a New York City policeman. As a boy Williams ran errands, sold newspapers, worked at a printer's office and at some point began performing bit parts at New York's Franklin Theatre. On one night in 1836 he was given the opportunity to play a speaking rôle in The Ice Witch that came available after actor Alonzo Williams suddenly fell ill. As a result of his performance, Williams became a regular cast member. His stage name was Barney Williams.

Barney's first big hit (c. 1840) was as Pat Rooney in The Omnibus (Williams: p. 69). This play was written by his mentor Tyrone Power around 1833. Maria made her stage debut at the Chatham Theatre as a member of the corps de ballet, in the first production of a burlesque entitled "New York Assurance"; it was a travesty on "London Assurance". Barney is also credited as introducing Irish clog dancing to America.

In 1843 Barney played the role of Jerry Murphy in Bumpology at the Chatham. In these days Williams played in several roles in the Tyrone Power repertory, including Paddy O’Rafferty in Born to Good Luck and Terry O’Rourke in The Irish Tutor. In 1844, Barney was a member of a company owned by P.T. Barnum called a "Moral Lecture Room". By 1845, at age twenty-two, Williams was manager of Vauxhall Garden located at LaFayette Street in New York.

For several seasons Williams was a popular blackface comedian touring with the Kentucky Minstrels before embarking in 1846 on his career as a comedian. On November 24, 1849, Williams married actress Maria Pray (1828–1911), the widow of actor Charles Mestayer who died the previous year. She was the daughter of William Pray, an actor who perished in a New York theatre fire, and a sister of Malvina Florence, actress wife of the well-known actor William J. Florence.

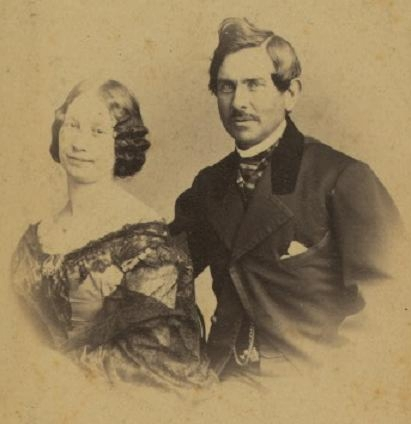
Maria and Barney Williams NYPL Digital Gallery

After marrying, Barney stopped acting in the negro minstrelsy genre.

In 1850 Barney and Maria appeared at The National Theatre in New York, in the title roles of The Irish Boy and Yankee Girl. On August 18 (1853), the Williamses commenced an engagement at Niblo's Garden in New York, appearing in Ireland As It Is. On August 25, the couple produced their new drama, Shandy McGuire, with both taking the lead roles.

As a team, Williams and Pray would find the greatest successes of their careers beginning [1854] with long runs at San Francisco's Metropolitan Theatre. They also performed in Sacramento, Marysville, Stockton, Grass Valley, and Nevada. The couple set sail for London on June 7, 1855, where they performed at the Adelphi Theatre in London. The latter engagement led to a four-year tour of Europe performing in plays such as Rory O'More among others. Williams often played Irish characters to Pray's Yankee in performances that on four occasions were attended by Queen Victoria. From 1856 to 1857 the Williamses performed at The Adelphi. According to the London Times they performed the following: Bobbing Around, Polly, Won’t You Try Me, Oh?, and My Own Mary Anne. Some of their more popular performances were Ireland As it Is, Barney the Baron and Our Gal. On July 24, 1856, Barney and Maria performed for the royal family, and again in February 1857. While in the U.K., the couple toured Dublin, Cork, Belfast, Limerick, Edinburgh, Glasgow, Liverpool, Manchester and Birmingham.

The Williamses returned to New York in October 1859. On October 17, 1859, they appeared at Niblo's Garden playing in Born to Good Luck, An Hour in Seville, and in Latest from New York. This engagement lasted 36 nights.

The two starred in annual tours throughout most of the 1860s before Williams was given the opportunity to manage (1867–1868) Wallack's Broadway Theatre. In the 1860s they most performed in Philadelphia, Baltimore, Washington and New York. By 1863 they were playing in Washington, D.C., performing The Fairy Circle in Grover Theatre in February. On February 26 they performed at Grover's for Abraham Lincoln. In October 1863 Barney performed for the Union troops of the 47th New York Infantry Volunteer Infantry as they sailed down the Hudson, as mentioned by Private Miles O’Reilly. Barney and Maria appeared at Niblo's Garden in New York in Irish and Yankee Life and The Connie Soogah, December 1864. Barney may have sung The Bowld Soldier Song for the Irish Brigade of the 63rd New York Volunteers in 1864.

Maria debuted on French stage, April 23, 1867; she appeared in the French Theatre in New York acting the part of Caesarine Clapier in the vaudeville of Le Marly dans du Coon. Barney and Maria appeared in The Emerald Ring at the Broadway Theatre in New York, April 5, 1869. On April 28, 1869, Barney played the last night the theatre was open in Ireland As It Was as Ragged Pat. Barney and Maria began an engagement in Connie Soogah, or the Jolly Peddler on September 21, 1874, at Booth's Theatre in New York. In December 1875 Barney performed – perhaps for last time – at Booth's theatre, The Coonie Soogah and The Fairy Circle.

Barney died in New York City as a result of a stroke while in his 51st year (1876). Over his career Williams’ success was such that he became one of the wealthiest actors of his day, leaving behind an estate considered to be in the neighborhood of $400,000.

Williams’ funeral service was held at St. Stephen's Roman Catholic Church on the morning of April 28, 1876. Listed among his pallbearers were General John C. Frémont, Judge John R. Brady and actors Lester Wallack and John Brougham. Williams’ remains were interred at the Green-Wood Cemetery in Brooklyn. He was survived by his wife, daughter Marie and three sisters.

Over on the other side of the cemetery, on Battle Hill, from which the bay and the city can be viewed, sleeps Barney Williams, almost the first actor in the line of Irish comedy. His monument is a rich and costly one, of the Gothic order. It is adorned with a marble bust of the comedian. On the base of the monument is the name "Bernard Flaherty," which was the real name of Barney Williams. Historic Long Island, 1902, Rufus Rockwell Wilson

Maria's last performance was in 1877, performing a week's engagement at the Walnut Street Theatre in Philadelphia. Maria Pray Williams died in 1911 in New York City.
