= David Fischer =

David Fischer may refer to:

- David Fischer (ice hockey) (born 1988), American hockey player
- David Fischer (weightlifter) (born 1998), Austrian-Bulgarian weightlifter
- David C. Fischer, Special Assistant to President Ronald Reagan
- David Hackett Fischer (born 1935), American historian
- David J. Fischer (1933–2025), former Mayor of St. Petersburg, Florida
- David Joseph Fischer (1939–2016), American diplomat, United States Ambassador to Seychelles
- David T. Fischer (born 1946), American business executive and diplomat, United States Ambassador to Morocco

== See also ==
- David Fisher (disambiguation)
