= The Sibyl (play) =

1813 play

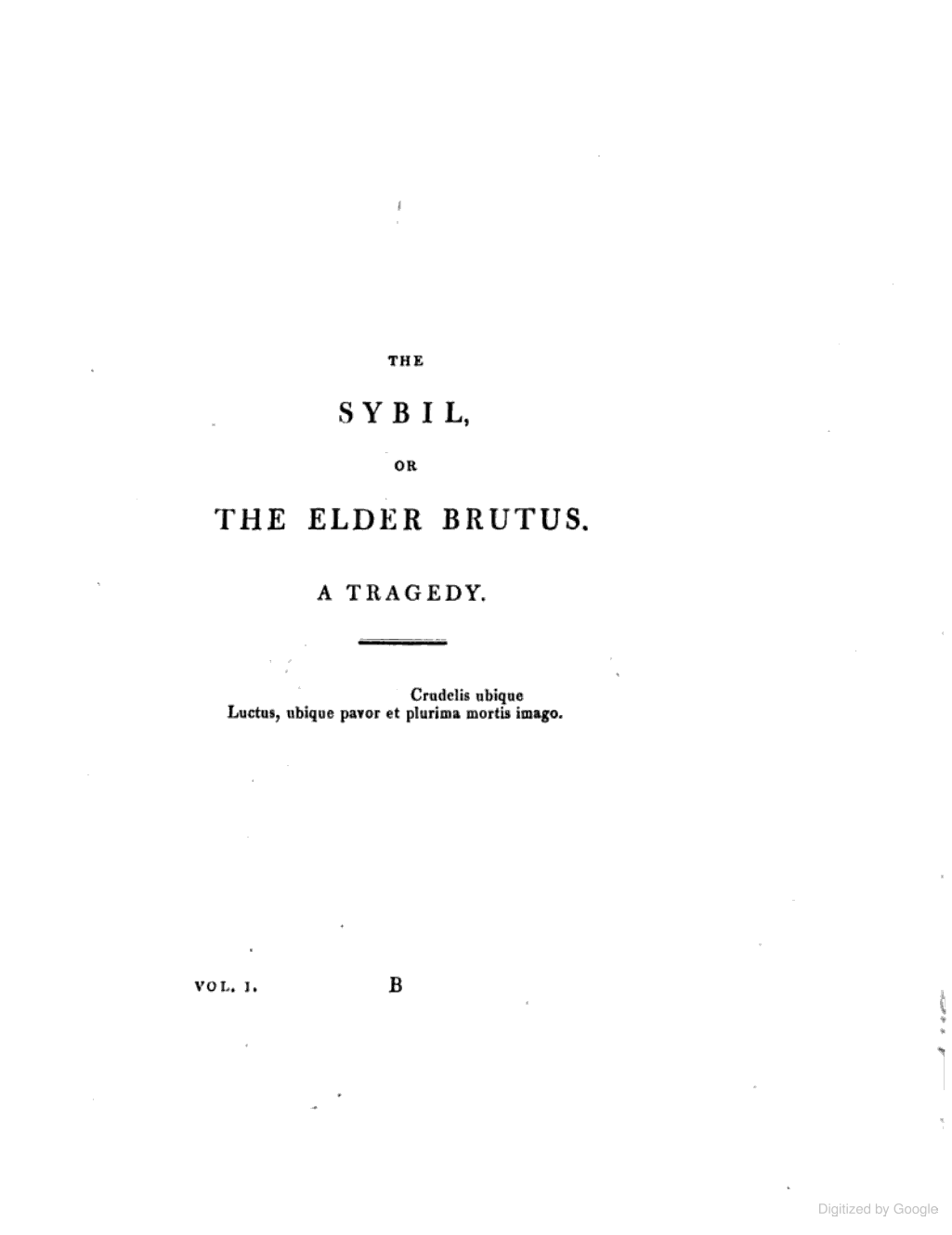
- Original language: English
- Written by: Richard Cumberland
- Genre: Historical tragedy
- Setting: Ancient Rome

Premiere
- Date: 3 December 1818 (rewritten by John Howard Payne)
- Place: Theatre Royal, Drury Lane, London

The Sibyl, or The Elder Brutus is a tragedy by the English writer Richard Cumberland. Written but not performed or printed in his lifetime, it was included in the posthumous collections of his works published in 1813. Inspired by the Cumaean Sibyl, it depicts the overthrow of the Roman monarchy. On 3 December 1818 it premiered at the Theatre Royal, Drury Lane in London. John Howard Payne substantially reworked the piece for production while Edmund Kean played the role of Brutus. It was performed and published under the title Brutus.

== Bibliography ==
- Burwick, Frederick. Time in Romantic Theatre. Springer Nature, 2022.
- Greene, John C. Theatre in Dublin, 1745-1820: A Calendar of Performances, Volume 6. Lexington Books, 2011.
- Nicoll, Allardyce. A History of English Drama 1660–1900: Volume III. Cambridge University Press, 2009.
- Williams, Stanley Thomas. Richard Cumberland: His Life and Dramatic Works. Yale University Press, 1917.
