= Brutus (play) =

1818 play

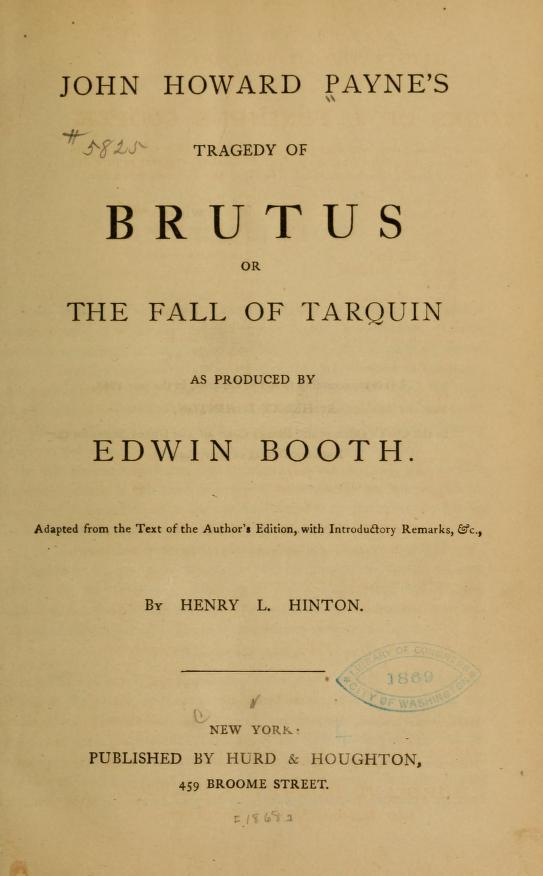
- 1868 edition
- Original language: English
- Written by: John Howard Payne
- Genre: Tragedy
- Setting: Ancient Rome

Premiere
- Date: 3 December 1818
- Place: Theatre Royal, Covent Garden, London

The Tragedy of Brutus; or, The Fall of Tarquin is an 1818 historical tragedy by the British-based American writer John Howard Payne. It premiered at the Theatre Royal, Drury Lane in London on 3 December 1818. The original cast included Edmund Kean as Brutus, David Fisher as Titus, Henry Kemble as Sextus Tarquin, Charles Holland as Valerius, William Penley as Aruns, Julia Glover as Tullia and Sarah West as Tarquinia. It draws heavily on Richard Cumberland's The Sibyl, published in 1813. It depicts the overthrow of the Roman monarchy, with Lucius Junius Brutus leading a plot against Lucius Tarquinius Superbus to establish the Roman Republic. James Northcote produced an 1819 painting Edmund Kean as Brutus, inspired by the play.

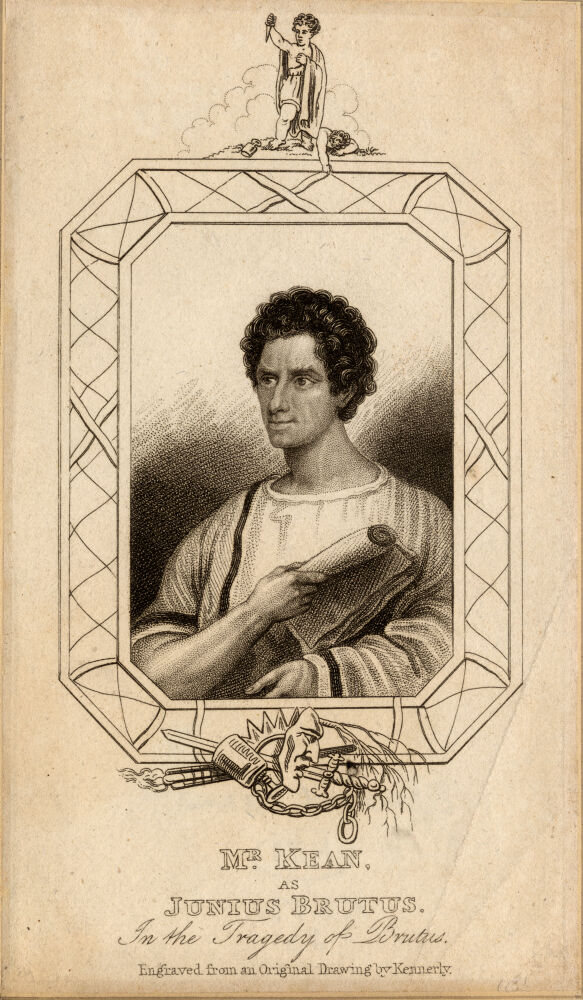
Edmund Kean as Brutus, 1825.

== Bibliography ==
- Burwick, Frederick Goslee, Nancy Moore & Hoeveler Diane Long. The Encyclopedia of Romantic Literature. John Wiley & Sons, 2012.
- Greene, John C. Theatre in Dublin, 1745-1820: A Calendar of Performances, Volume 6. Lexington Books, 2011.
- Nicoll, Allardyce. A History of English Drama 1660–1900: Volume III. Cambridge University Press, 2009.
