= Shriners =

Masonic organization

Logo of Shriners International

Shriners International, formally known as the Ancient Arabic Order of the Nobles of the Mystic Shrine (AAONMS), is an American Masonic society. Founded in 1872 in New York City, it is headquartered in Tampa, Florida, and has over 200 chapters across nine countries, with a global membership of approximately 200,000 members in 2026. The organization is known for its colorful Middle Eastern theme, elaborate participation in parades and festivals, and the Shriners Children's network of nonprofit pediatric medical facilities.

Shriners International describes itself as a global fraternity "based on fun, fellowship, and the Masonic principles of brotherly love, relief, and truth". As an appendant body within Freemasonry, membership is open to men who have been raised to the degree of Master Masons in Masonic rites; various partner organizations accept women and youth. Shriners are obliged to uphold the fraternity's mission and values, which include self-improvement, service and leadership to the community, and active involvement in social and philanthropic causes.

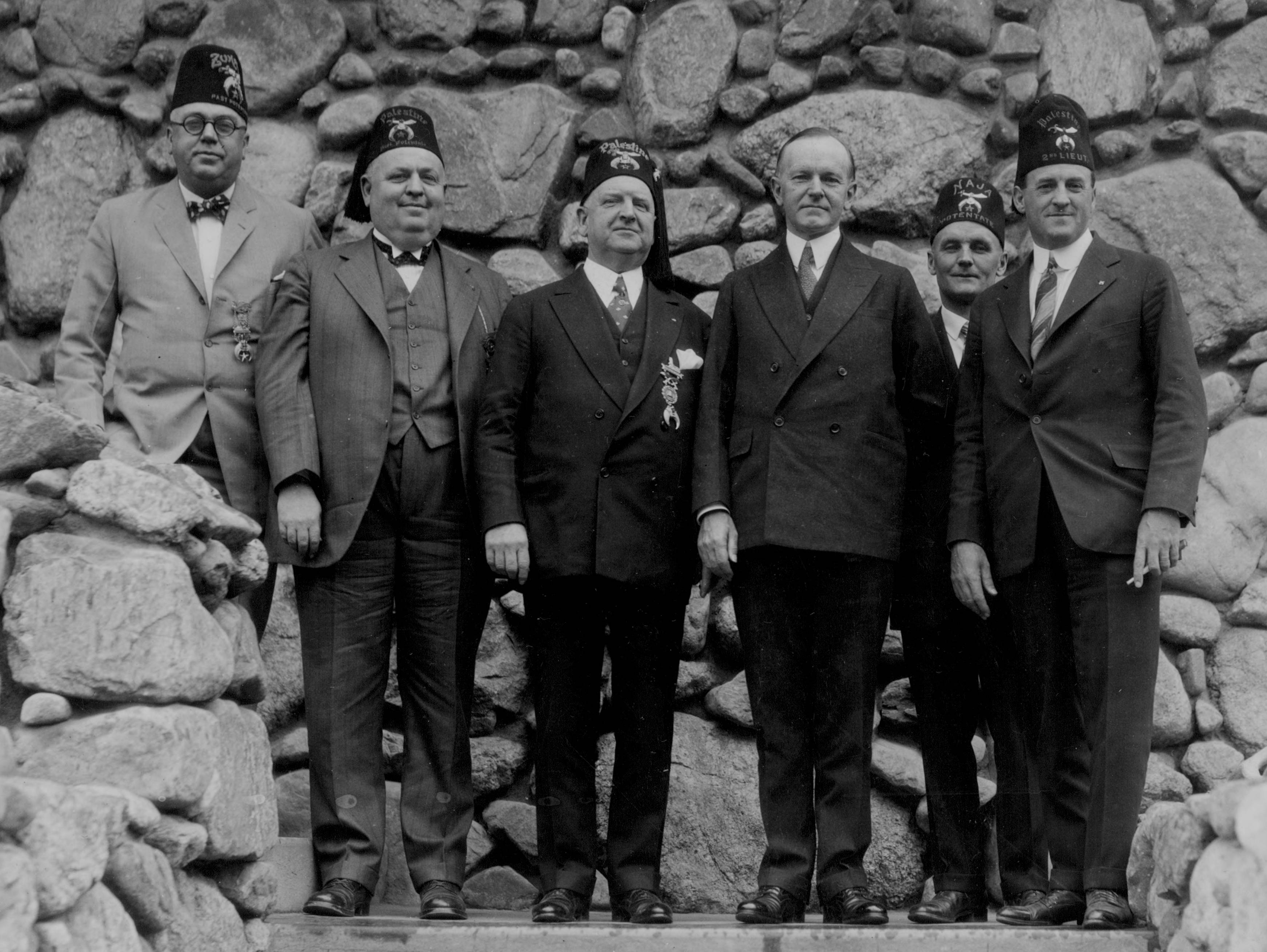
President Coolidge with Shriners in South Dakota, 1927

Shriners International is recognizable for its Middle Eastern-inspired iconography, ceremonies, and motif: Shriners wear distinctive red fezzes as their official headgear, while fraternal regalia often features camels, pyramids, the Sphinx and other ancient Egyptian and Arabian symbols. The headquarters of local chapters, formally known as Shrine Centers, are sometimes called "Temples" or even "Mosques"; most have names such as Egypt, Sahara, Morocco, and Oasis, and many are built in the Moorish Revival style. The organization is governed by the "Imperial Divan"—referring to the traditional government councils of the Near East—composed of 12 "Imperial Officers" who serve as a board of directors. However, Shriners International has no connection with the region nor with Islam.

Previously known as Shriners North America, the fraternity adopted its current name in 2010 in recognition of its increasingly global membership; as of 2024, there are Shrine Centers in Canada (since 1888), Mexico (1907), Panama (1918), Puerto Rico, the Philippines (2010), Germany (2011), Brazil (2015) and Bolivia (2018).

Notable American Shriners include FBI Director J. Edgar Hoover, actors Mel Blanc, John Wayne, Ernest Borgnine, and Roy Rogers, Supreme Court chief justice Earl Warren, General Douglas MacArthur, and presidents Gerald Ford and Harry Truman.

== History ==
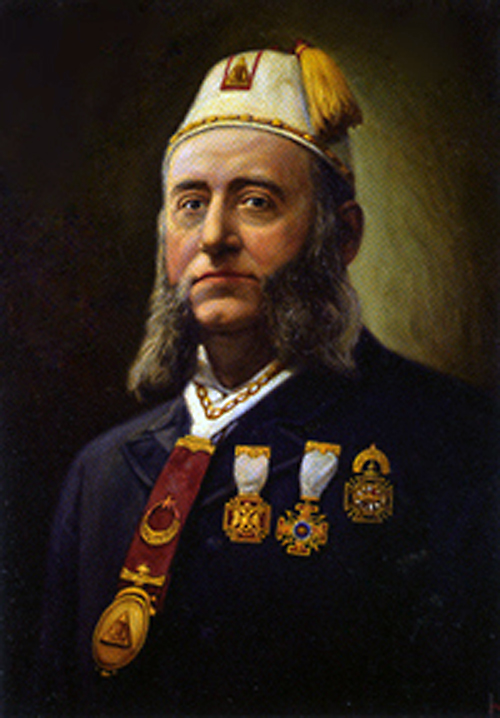
Walter M. Fleming

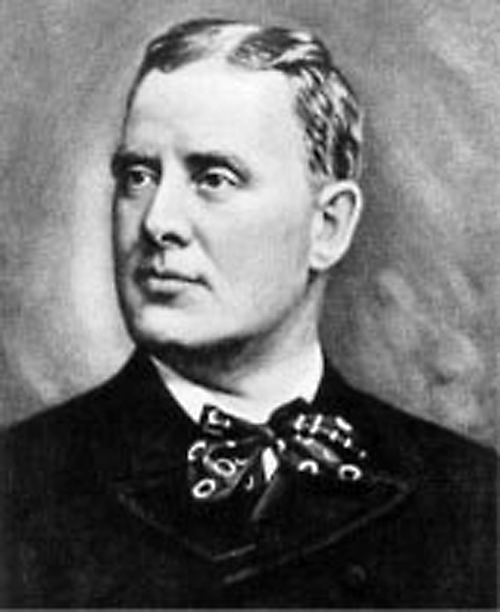
William J. Florence

In 1870, there were several thousand Freemasons in Manhattan, many of whom lunched at the Knickerbocker Cottage at a special table on the second floor. There, the idea of a new fraternity for Masons, stressing fun and fellowship, was discussed. Together, Walter M. Fleming and William J. Florence established a separate fellowship to fulfill those ideals.

While on tour in Marseille, Florence, an actor, was invited to a party given by an Arab diplomat. The entertainment was a musical comedy. At its conclusion, the guests became members of a secret society. Florence took notes and drawings at his initial viewing and on two other occasions, once in Algiers and once in Cairo. When he returned to New York in 1870, he showed his material to Fleming.

Fleming created the ritual, emblem and costumes. Florence and Fleming were initiated August 13, 1870, and they initiated 11 men on June 16, 1871.

The group adopted a Middle Eastern theme and soon established Temple, although the term Temple has now been replaced by Shrine Auditorium or Shrine Center. The first Temple established was Mecca Temple, established at the New York City Masonic Hall on September 26, 1872. Fleming was the first potentate.

In 1875, there were 43 Shriners in the organization. To encourage membership, the Imperial Grand Council of the Ancient Order of the Nobles of the Mystic Shrine for North America was created at the June 6, 1876 meeting of Mecca Temple. Fleming was elected the first imperial potentate. By 1878, there were 425 members in 13 temples in eight states, and by 1888, there were 7,210 members in 48 temples in the United States and Canada. By the Imperial Session held in Washington, D.C., in 1900, there were 55,000 members and 82 Temples.

=== Prince Hall Shrinedom ===
Historically, the Shrine was open to only White men. In 1893, an African American counterpart to the Shriners movement was initiated by John G. Jones and 13 other Prince Hall masons, known as the "Imperial Grand Council of Prince Hall Shriners, Ancient Arabic Order Nobles Mystic Shrine" (A.A.O.N.M.S.). In 1900, the name was changed to the "Ancient Egyptian Arabic Order Nobles Mystic Shrine of North and South America and its Jurisdiction, Incorporate" (A.E.A.O.N.M.S).

Beginning in 1919, there were legal conflicts between the White and African American orders, with a White only order from Texas filing a lawsuit against a local African American order for infringement of White Shriners regalia and traditions. The White order was initially successful in quashing the predominantly African American temple until the ruling was overturned in appeals in 1929; protecting the right of the African American Prince Hall Shriners to continue calling themselves Shriners; using its emblems; practicing its rituals; and fundraising nationwide.

The Worldwide Fraternal Shrine Family is headquartered in Memphis, Tennessee, and counts 25,000 members in 270 shrines; with its own women's auxiliary organizations. Their primary recipients of charitable donations are the Legal Defense Fund, the NAACP, the National Urban League, the UNCF, and various hospitals and universities.

=== Syria Mosque ===
In 1911, the Syria Mosque was completed in Pittsburgh and inaugurated in 1916. This 3,700-seat performance venue, originally for Shriners, later became significant as the "birthplace of network television". An example of Exotic Revival architecture, it was never used as a mosque but featured religious Arabic iconography and inscriptions, partly based on the Alhambra. Architect Gulzar Haider was "fascinated" by its design, but criticized the "insensitive and callous misuse of another religion’s artistic vocabulary and symbolic grammar," claiming it was part of the "'oriental obsession' of the otherwise 'puritanical' Europeans and Americans".

Musicians who have performed at the Syria Mosque include Bruce Springsteen, Louis Armstrong, Bob Dylan, Pink Floyd, Jimmy Buffett, and The Beach Boys. Political event hosts included Reagan, Nixon, Truman, and Kennedy. Despite efforts to conserve the building as a historic landmark, the Syria Mosque was torn down in 1991.

=== Women's auxiliaries ===
The Ladies Oriental Shrine of North America was founded in 1903 in Wheeling, West Virginia, and the Daughters of the Nile was founded in 1913 in Seattle, Washington. Both are for women only and they support the Shriners Hospitals and promote sociability. Membership in either organization is open to any woman 18 years of age and older who is related to a Shriner or Master Mason by birth or marriage. The latter organization has local branches called "Temples," and there were ten of these in 1922. Among the famous members of the Daughters of the Nile was First Lady Florence Harding, wife of Warren G. Harding.

=== Growth ===
By 1938 there were about 340,000 members in the United States. That year, Life published photographs of the Shriners' rites. It described the Shriners as being the first in prestige, wealth and show among secret societies, and that Shriners organizations typically include a town's most prominent citizens.

=== Organizational rebranding ===
In 2002, following the September 11 attacks, the "faux-Middle Eastern practices and trappings" led Shriners to be "mistaken for a Muslim organization, leading to harassment and vandalism". This included threatening phone calls and harassment of Rhode Island Shriners (formerly known as Palestine Temple Shriners) driving a Shriners van to transport sick children to Shriner hospitals.

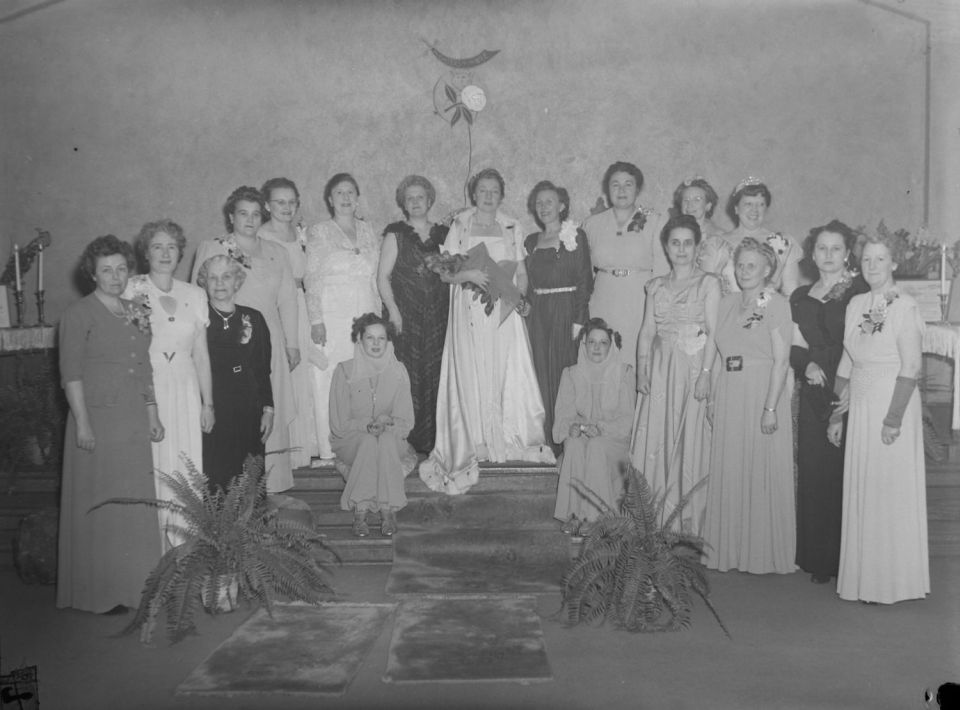
Daughters of the Nile at Shriners Hospital for Children – Canada in Montreal in 1948.

By 2011, Shriners removed much of the Middle Eastern theming, both locally and within the broader organization. This was in continued response to "the events of Sept. 11, 2001 and subsequent military conflicts". Changes included renaming the organization from "Ancient Arabic Order of the Nobles of the Mystic Shrine" to "Shriners International;" renaming the "Arabic Patrol" to "The Patrol" and removing the word Syria from Syria Shriners vanity plates. Despite these changes, the Illustrious Potentate of Pittsburgh's Syria Shrine chapter stated that "pretty much all non-atheists are welcome, including Muslims".

== Membership ==
Historically, a Mason had to complete either the Scottish Rite or York Rite systems to be eligible for membership in the Shrine. However, since July 2000, the only requirement for membership as a Shriner is to be a Master Mason in good standing.

In 1991, brick-mason Michael G. Vaughan filed a lawsuit against the Oleika Shrine Temple in Lexington, Kentucky, for hazing practices to which he said he was subjected in his efforts to become a Shriner. In court, Vaughan told jurors that in June 1989, he was blindfolded and received a jolt of electricity that was applied to his bare buttocks as part of the Shriners' initiation rites. He said he was forced to walk on an electric mat that was meant to simulate the hot sands of the Sahara, and that he was knocked unconscious and received other injuries during his initiation. Vaughan said the initiation left him humiliated and embarrassed, and caused him to suffer anxiety, nightmares, and a sleep disorder. After two hours of deliberation, the jury rejected the claim.

== Architecture ==
Some of the earliest Shrine Centers often chose a Moorish Revival style for their Temples. Architecturally notable Shriners Temples include: the Shrine Auditorium in Los Angeles; the former Mecca Temple, now called New York City Center and used primarily as a concert hall; Medinah Temple in Chicago; Newark Symphony Hall; the Landmark Theater (formerly The Mosque) in Richmond, Virginia; the Tripoli Shrine Temple in Milwaukee, Wisconsin; the Polly Rosenbaum Building (formerly the El Zaribah Shrine Auditorium) in Phoenix; the Helena Civic Center (Montana) (formerly the Algeria Shrine Temple); Abou Ben Adhem Shrine Mosque in Springfield, Missouri; Murat Shrine Temple (now Old National Center) in Indianapolis; the Fox Theatre in Atlanta, Georgia, which was jointly built between the Atlanta Shriners and movie mogul William Fox; and the Syria Mosque in Pittsburgh, Pennsylvania.

== Philanthropy ==
=== Shriners Hospitals for Children ===
The Shrine's charitable arm is the Shriners Hospitals for Children, a network of 22 healthcare facilities in the United States, Mexico, and Canada.

In June 1920, the Imperial Council Session voted to establish a Shriners Hospital for Crippled Children to treat orthopedic injuries and conditions, diseases, burns, spinal cord injuries, and birth defects, such as cleft lip and palate, in children. The first hospital opened in 1922 in Shreveport, Louisiana. By the end of the decade 13 more hospitals were operational.

Any child under the age of 18 can be admitted to the hospital if a doctor determines the child can be treated. There is no requirement for religion, race or relationship to a Shriner.

Until June 2012, all care at Shriners Hospitals was provided without charge to patients and their families. At that time, because the size of their endowment had decreased due to losses in the stock market, Shriners Hospitals started billing patients' insurance companies, but continued to offer free care to children without insurance. Shriners hospitals waive all costs insurance does not cover. Shriners Hospitals for Children is a 501(c)(3) nonprofit organization.

Shriners Hospitals for Children are located in these cities:

- Boston, Massachusetts
- Chicago, Illinois
- Dayton, Ohio
- Erie, Pennsylvania*
- Galveston, Texas
- Greenville, South Carolina
- Honolulu, Hawaii
- Houston, Texas
- Lexington, Kentucky (Note: This location is an outpatient, ambulatory care center.)
- Mexico City, DF, Mexico
- Minneapolis, Minnesota
- Montreal, Quebec, Canada
- Pasadena, California*
- Philadelphia, Pennsylvania
- Portland, Oregon
- Sacramento, California
- Salt Lake City, Utah
- Shreveport, Louisiana
- Spokane, Washington
- Springfield, Massachusetts
- St. Louis, Missouri

== Events ==
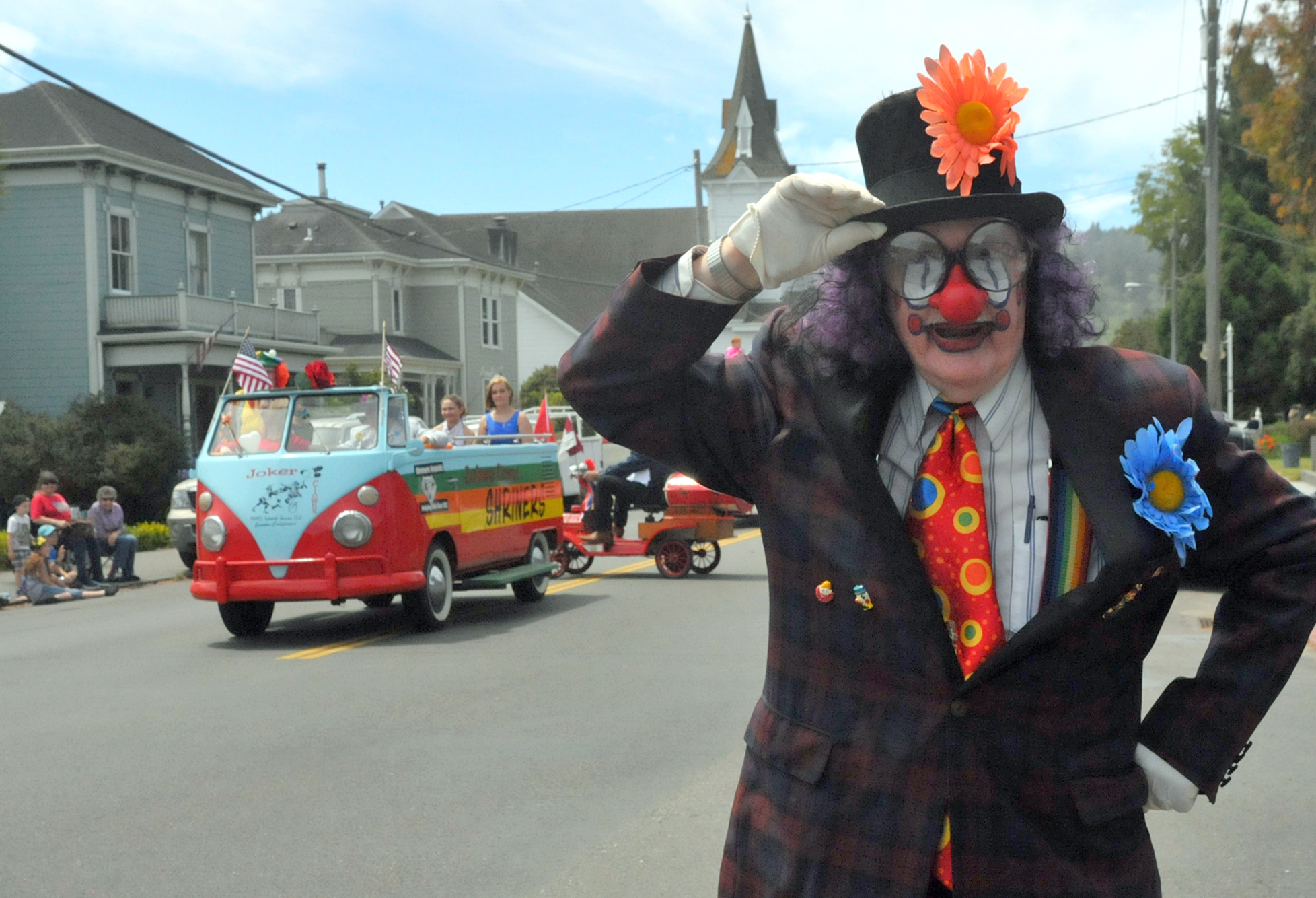
A Shriner clown

Shriners host the annual East–West Shrine Game, a college football all-star game.

The Shriners originally hosted a golf tournament in association with singer/actor Justin Timberlake, called the Justin Timberlake Shriners Hospitals for Children Open, a PGA Tour golf tournament played in Las Vegas, Nevada. The relationship between Timberlake and the Shriners ended in 2012, when the Shriners reported that Timberlake was interested in being involved with the organization only when television cameras were present. In July 2012, the PGA Tour and Shriners Hospitals for Children announced a five-year title sponsorship extension, carrying the commitment to the Shriners Hospitals for Children Open through 2017. The name was changed to The Shriners Hospitals for Children Open and is played in Las Vegas, Nevada.

Many Shrine Centers also hold a yearly Shrine Circus as a fundraiser.

Once a year, the fraternity meets for the Imperial Session in a North American city.

=== Shriners International Imperial Sessions ===
Shriners International Imperial Sessions
#	Year	City	State/Province	Host Chapter	Imperial Potentate
1	1876	New York	NY	Mecca	Walter M. Fleming (Mecca)
2	1877	Albany	NY	Cyprus	Walter M. Fleming (Mecca)
3	1878	New York	NY	Mecca	Walter M. Fleming (Mecca)
4	1879	Albany	NY	Cyprus	Walter M. Fleming (Mecca)
5	1880	New York	NY	Mecca	Walter M. Fleming (Mecca)
6	1880	New York	NY	Mecca	Walter M. Fleming (Mecca)
7	1881	New York	NY	Mecca	Walter M. Fleming (Mecca)
8	1882	New York	NY	Mecca	Walter M. Fleming (Mecca)
9	1883	New York	NY	Mecca	Walter M. Fleming (Mecca)
10	1884	New York	NY	Mecca	Walter M. Fleming (Mecca)
11	1885	New York	NY	Mecca	Walter M. Fleming (Mecca)
12	1886	Cleveland	OH	Al Koran	Sam Briggs (Al Koran)
13	1887	Indianapolis	IN	Murat	Sam Briggs (Al Koran)
14	1888	Toronto	Ontario	Rameses	Sam Briggs (Al Koran)
15	1889	Chicago	IL	Medinah	Sam Briggs (Al Koran)
16	1890	Pittsburgh	PA	Syria	Sam Briggs (Al Koran)
17	1891	Niagara Falls	NY	Ismailia	Sam Briggs (Al Koran)
18	1892	Omaha	NE	Tangier	William Bromwell Melish (Syrian)
19	1893	Cincinnati	OH	Syria	William Bromwell Melish (Syrian)
20	1894	Denver	CO	El Jebel	Thomas J. Hudson (Syria)
21	1895	Nantasket Beach	MA	Aleppo	Charles L. Field (Islam)
22	1896	Cleveland	OH	Al Koran	Harrison Dingman (Almas)
23	1897	Detroit	MI	Moslem	Albert B. McGaffey (El Jebel)
24	1898	Dallas	TX	Hella	Ethelbert F. Allen (Ararat)
25	1899	Buffalo	NY	Ismailia	John H. Atwood (Tangier)
26	1900	Washington	DC	Almas	Lou B. Winsor (Saladin)
27	1901	Kansas City	MO	Ararat	Philip C. Shaffer (Lu Lu)
28	1902	San Francisco	CA	Islam	Henry C. Akin (Tangier)
29	1903	Saratoga Springs	NY	Oriental	George L. Brown (Ismailia)
30	1904	Atlantic City	NJ	Crescent	George L. Brown (Ismailia)
31	1905	Niagara Falls	NY	Ismailia	Henry A. Collins (Rameses)
32	1906	Chicago	IL	Medinah	Alvah P. Clayton (Moila)
33	1907	Los Angeles	CA	Al Malaikah	Frank C. Roundy (Medinah)
34	1908	Saint Paul	MN	Osman	Edwin I. Alderman (El Kahir)
35	1909	Louisville	KY	Kosair	George L. Street (Acca)
36	1910	New Orleans	LA	Jerusalem	Fred A. Hines (Al Malaikah)
37	1911	Rochester	NY	Damascus	John F. Treat (El Zagal)
38	1912	Los Angeles	CA	Al Malaikah	William J. Cunningham (Boumi)
39	1913	Dallas	TX	Hella	William W. Irwin (Osiris)
40	1914	Atlanta	GA	Yaarab	Frederick R. Smith (Damascus)
41	1915	Seattle	WA	Nile	J. Putnam Stevens (Kora)
42	1916	Buffalo	NY	Ismailia	Henry F. Niedringhaus (Moolah)
43	1917	Minneapolis	MN	Zurah	Charles E. Ovenshire (Zuhrah)
44	1918	Atlantic City	NJ	Crescent	Elias J. Jacoby (Murat)
45	1919	Indianapolis	IN	Murat	W. Freeland Kendrick (LuLu)
46	1920	Portland	OR	Al Kader	Ellis Lewis Garretson (Afifi)
47	1921	Des Moines	IA	Za-Ga-Zig	Ernest A. Cutts (Alee)
48	1922	San Francisco	CA	Islam	James S. McCandless (Aloha)
49	1923	Washington	DC	Almas	Conrad V. Dykeman (Kismet)
50	1924	Kansas City	MO	Ararat	James E. Chandler (Ararat)
51	1925	Los Angeles	CA	Al Malaikah	James C. Burger (El Jebel)
52	1926	Philadelphia	PA	LuLu	David W. Crosland (Alcazar)
53	1927	Atlantic City	NJ	Crescent	Clarence M. Dunbar (Palestine)
54	1928	Miami	FL	Mahi	Frank C. Jones (Arabia)
55	1929	Los Angeles	CA	Al Malaikah	Leo V. Youngworth (Al Malaikah)
56	1930	Toronto	Ontario	Rameses	Esten A. Fletcher (Damascus)
57	1931	Cleveland	OH	Al Koran	Thomas J. Houston (Medinah)
58	1932	San Francisco	CA	Islam	Earl C. Mills (Za-Ga-Zig)
59	1933	Atlantic City	NJ	Crescent	John N. Sebrell (Khedive)
60	1934	Minneapolis	MN	Zurah	Dana S. Williams (Kora)
61	1935	Washington	DC	Almas	Leonard P. Steuart (Almas)
62	1936	Seattle	WA	Nile	Clyde I. Webster (Moslem)
63	1937	Detroit	MI	Moslem	Walter Smith Sugden (Osiris)
64	1938	Los Angeles	CA	Al Malaikah	A. A. D. Rahn (Zurah)
65	1939	Baltimore	MD	Boumi	Walter D. Cline (Maskat)
66	1940	Memphis	TN	Al Chymia	George F. Olendorf (Abou Ben Adhem)
67	1941	Indianapolis	IN	Murat	Thomas C. Law (Yaarab)
68	1942	Chicago	IL	Medinah	Albert H. Fiebach (Al Koran)
69	1943	Chicago	IL	Medinah	Morley E. MacKenzie (Rameses)
70	1944	Milwaukee	WI	Tripoli	Alfred G. Arvold (El Zagal)
71	1945	Chicago	IL	Medinah	William H. Woodfield Jr. (Islam)
72	1946	San Francisco	CA	Islam	George H. Bowe (Cyprus)
73	1947	Atlantic City	NJ	Crescent	Karl Rex Hammers (Syria)
74	1948	Atlantic City	NJ	Crescent	Gallaway Calhoun (Sharon)
75	1949	Chicago	IL	Medinah	Harold Clayton Lloyd (Al Malaikah)
76	1950	Los Angeles	CA	Al Malaikah	Hubert McNeill Poteat (Sudan)
77	1951	New York	NY	Mecca	Robert Gardiner Wilson Jr. (Aleppo)
78	1952	Miami	FL	Mahi	Harvey A. Beffa (Moolah)
79	1953	New York	NY	Mecca	Remmie LeRoy Arnold (Acca)
80	1954	Atlantic City	NJ	Crescent	Frank S. Land (Ararat)
81	1955	Chicago	IL	Medinah	Walter C. Gay (Scimitar)
82	1956	Detroit	MI	Moslem	Gerald D. Crary (Naja)
83	1957	Atlanta	GA	Yaarab	Thomas W. Melham (Zemora)
84	1958	Chicago	IL	Medinah	George E. Stringfellow (Salaam)
85	1959	Atlantic City	NJ	Crescent	Clayton F. Andrews (El Maida)
86	1960	Denver	CO	El Jebel	George A. Mattison Jr. (Zamora)
87	1961	Miami	FL	Mahi	Marshall M. (Marsh) Porter (Al Azhar)
88	1962	Toronto	Ontario	Rameses	George M. Klepper Sr. (Al Chymia)
89	1963	Chicago	IL	Medinah	Harold C. Close (Sphinx)
90	1964	New York	NY	Mecca	O. Carlyle Brock (Zem Zem)
91	1965	Washington	DC	Almas	Barney W. Collins (Anezeh)
92	1966	San Francisco	CA	Islam	Orville F. Rush (Kena)
93	1967	Washington	DC	Almas	Thomas F. Seay (Medinah)
94	1968	Chicago	IL	Medinah	Chester A. Hogan (Nile)
95	1969	Seattle	WA	Nile	J. Worth Baker (Murat)
96	1970	Indianapolis	IN	Murat	Aubrey G. Graham (Khedive)
97	1971	Miami	FL	Mahi	C. Victor Thornton (Moslah)
98	1972	Dallas	TX	Hella	Henry B. Struby (Hadi)
99	1973	Atlanta	GA	Yaarab	J. A. Wingerter (Salaam)
100	1974	Atlantic City	NJ	Crescent	Jack M. Streight (Gizeh)
101	1975	Toronto	Ontario	Rameses	W. W. (Woody) Bennett (Ararat)
102	1976	Kansas City	MO	Arara	Peter Val Preda (Cairo)
103	1977	New York	NY	Mecca	Fred R. Morrison Sr. (Moslem)
104	1978	Detroit	MI	Moslem	Warren F. Weck Jr. (Zuhrah)
105	1979	Denver	CO	El Jebel	Charles J. Claypool (Antioch)
106	1980	Milwaukee	WI	Tripoli	F. T. H. Doubler Jr. (Abou Ben Adhem)
107	1981	New Orleans	LA	Jerusalem	Randolph R. Thomas (Morocco)
108	1982	Orlando	FL	Bahia	Daniel E. Bowers (Mohammed)
109	1983	Denver	CO	El Jebel	Richard B. Olfene (Kora)
110	1984	Boston	MA	Aleppo	V. Gene Bracewell (Yaarab)
111	1985	Atlanta	GA	Yaarab	Walker S. Kisselburgh (Al Malaikah)
112	1986	Los Angeles	CA	Al Malaikah	Russell H. Anthony (El Kahir)
113	1987	Las Vegas	NV	Zelzah	Voris King (Habibi)
114	1988	New Orleans	LA	Jerusalem	Edward G. McMullan (Al Azhar)
115	1989	Toronto	Ontario	Rameses	George Washington Powell (Crescent)
116	1990	Chicago	IL	Medinah	Joseph P. Padgett (Islam)
117	1991	San Francisco	CA	Islam	John W. Dean III (LuLu)
118	1992	Orlando	FL	Bahia	Everett M. Evans (Sharon)
119	1993	San Antonio	TX	Alzafar	Richard L. Bukey (Sabbar)
120	1994	Denver	CO	El Jebel	Burton Ravellette Jr. (Sahara)
121	1995	Indianapolis	IN	Murat	Robert B. Bailey (Orak)
122	1996	New Orleans	LA	Jerusalem	John D. Vermass (Sesostris)
123	1997	Saint Louis	MO	Moolah	Lewis B. Brantley (Morocco)
124	1998	Orlando	FL	Bahia	John C. Nobles (El Maida)
125	1999	Dallas	TX	Hella	Ralph W. Semb (Melha)
126	2000	Boston	MA	Aleppo	Robert N. Turnipseed (Calam)
127	2001	Las Vegas	NV	Zelzah	Kenneth W. Smith (Gizeh)
128	2002	Vancouver	British Columbia	Gizeh	Charles A. Claypool (Antioch)
129	2003	Minneapolis	MN	Zurah	M. Burton Oien (Al Aska)
130	2004	Denver	CO	El Jebel	Raoull L. Frevel Sr. (Boumi)
131	2005	Baltimore	MD	Boumi	Gary W. Dunwoody (Scimitar)
132	2006	Tampa	FL	Egypt	Nicholas Thomas (Al Malaikah)
133	2007	Anaheim	CA	El Bekal	Bernard J. Lemieux (Zenobia)
134	2008	Saint Louis	MO	Moolah	Douglas E. Maxwell (Moolah)
135	2009	San Antonio	TX	Alzafar	Terry McGuire (Alzafar)
136	2010	Toronto	Ontario	Rameses	George A. Mitchell (Rameses)
137	2011	Denver	CO	El Jebel	Michael G. Severe (El Jebel)
138	2012	Charlotte	NC	Oasis	Alan W. Madsen (Oasis)
139	2013	Indianapolis	IN	Murat	John A. Cinotto (Murat)
140	2014	Minneapolis	MN	Zurah	Dale W. Stauss (Kem)
141	2015	Houston	TX	Arabia	Jerry G. Gantt (Arabia)
142	2016	Tampa	FL	Egypt	Chris Smith (Wahabi)
143	2017	Daytona Beach	FL	Bahia	Gary Bergenske (Bahia)
144	2018	Daytona Beach	FL	Bahia	Jim L. Cain Sr. (Al Menah)
145	2019	Nashville	TN	Al Menah	Jeffrey L. Sowder (Midian)
146	2020	Tampa	FL	Egypt	James R. Smith (Ben Hur)
147	2021	Houston	TX	Arabia	William S. Bailey (Orak)
148	2022	Minneapolis	MN	Zurah	Kenneth G. Craven (Omar)
149	2023	Charlotte	NC	Oasis	James E. Stolze Jr. (El Zaribah)
150	2024	Reno	NV	Kerak	Richard Burke (Yaarab)
151	2025	Atlanta	GA	Yaarab	Brad T. Koehn (Arab)
152	2026	Tampa	FL	Egypt	
153	2027	Philadelphia	PA	Lulu	
154	2028	Pittsburgh	PA	Syria	

== Controversies ==
In 2008, an investigative committee established by the joint boards of the Shriners of North America fraternity and the Shriners Hospitals for Children found that Ralph Semb, chairman of the Shriners Hospitals Board of Trustees, had unilaterally tried to fire fund-raising executive Edgar McGonigal. McGonigal had declined to hire a direct-mail company indirectly linked to Gene Bracewell, the imperial treasurer of the fraternal organization. McGonigal said he did not hire the company because of its ties to a financial company that had performed poorly in previous dealings. The committee found that Semb and Bracewell had violated the organizations' conflict of interest policy and their ethics code and recommended that Semb and Bracewell be reprimanded. The report included accusations of financial improprieties within the organization, including not reporting benefits Shriners leaders received as income and knowingly filing incorrect tax forms for the hospitals. Other Shriners came forward with additional complaints, including the mixing of charitable and noncharitable assets and the disappearance of money raised for the hospitals.

Shriners International has drawn criticism from animal welfare organizations for allowing member clubs to host circuses featuring animals. Since approximately 2013, People for the Ethical Treatment of Animals (PETA) has staged protests during circus performances, expressing concern over the poor treatment animals receive in the care of the companies that the Shriners lease from, such as Carson & Barnes. The Pittsburgh Shrine Circus stopped using animals in 2019, and the Moolah Shrine Circus in Missouri stopped using elephants in 2023.

== See also ==
- Cultural appropriation
- Iowa Corn Song
- Military Order of the Cootie
- Order of Quetzalcoatl
- Royal Order of Jesters
- "Shriner's Convention", a country-and-western novelty song
