= Malvina Pray Florence =

American dancer and comic actress (1830–1906)

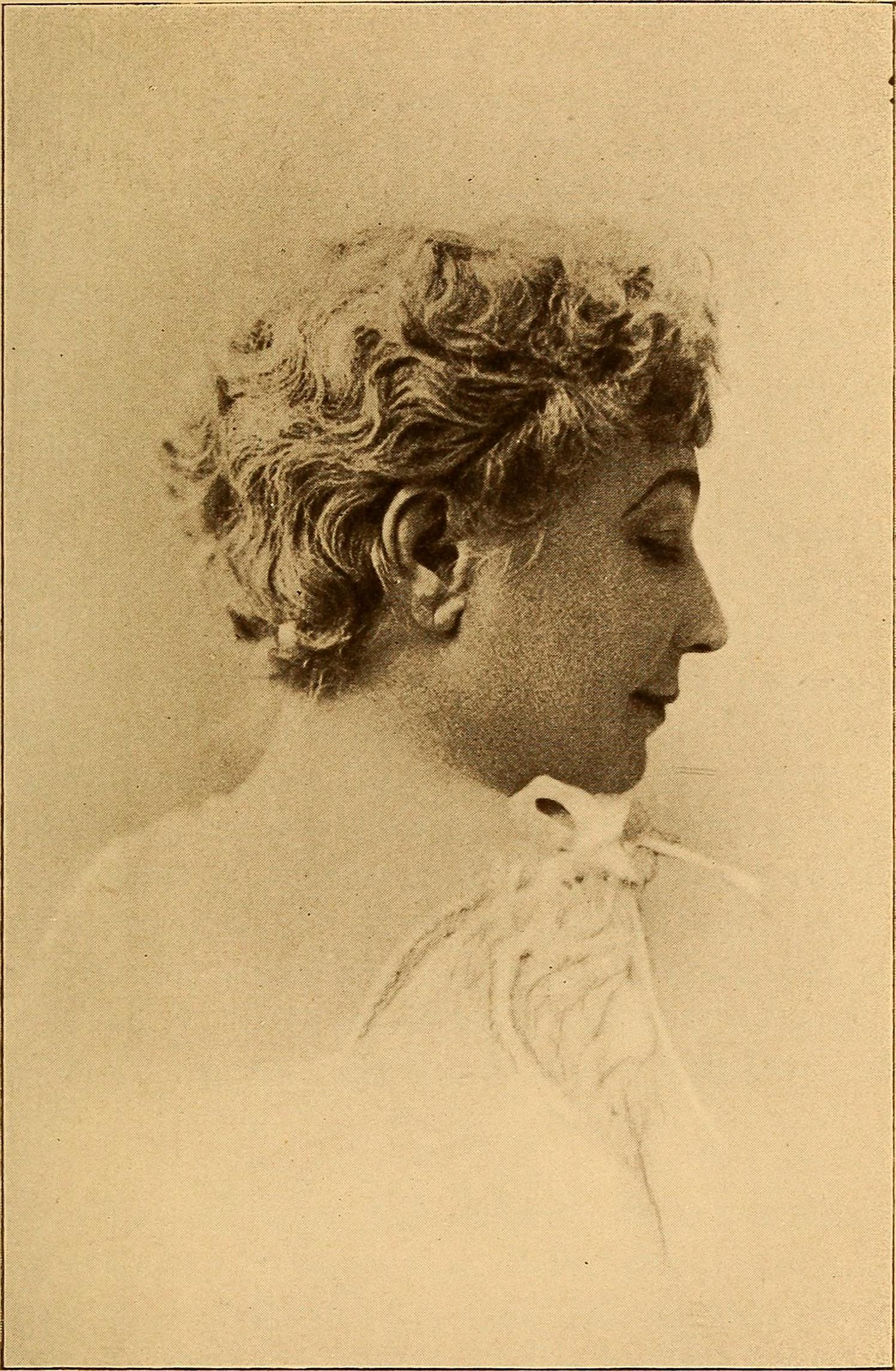
Malvina Pray Florence

Malvina Pray Florence (April 19, 1830 – February 18, 1906) was an American dancer and comic Actor. She was the first American comic actress to play on the English stage.

== Biography ==
Born as Anna Theresa Pray on April 19, 1830, in New York City, United States, Malvina Pray Florence was the daughter of Samuel Pray and his wife, Anna Lewis. She studied dancing with Madame Dagarden. She professionally adopted the name Malvina. She began her career as a dancer during the mid-1840s in various New York theaters including the Olympic, Castle Carden, Vauxhall Carden, and Greenwich.

At the age of sixteen, she was married to actor Joseph Littell, which ended in divorce in 1846. In 1853 she married William Jermyn Florence, American actor, with whom she entered upon a long period of starring. Both are known for specializing Irish comedies. She often appeared on the stage as a Yankee to his Irishman. She also played Mrs. Gilflory opposite him in Woolf's play, the Mighty Dollar.

She had a four-decade-long career as a comedienne touring the United States and Great Britain, becoming the first American comedienne to perform in Europe beginning in 1856.

She also performed in different plays such as The Yankee Gal (1853), Ireland As It Is and Woman's Wrong, Dombey and Son (1862), The Ticket-of-Leave Man (1863), and Our Governor (1885).

James claims that she was a dancer extraordinaire. In 1889 she announced her retirement.

She died on February 18, 1906, in New York City, United States.
