= The Lottery of Life =

1867 play by John Brougham

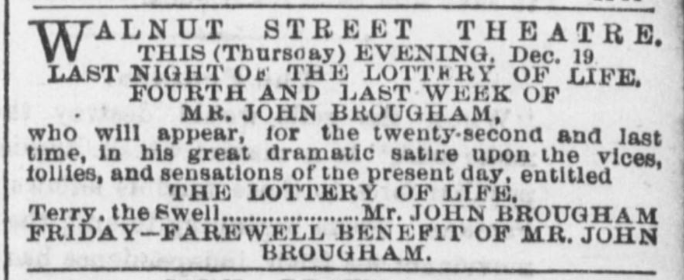
Advertisement in Philadelphia Evening Telegraph, December 19, 1867

The Lottery of Life is an 1867 play by John Brougham, one of his more popular works.

== Original run ==
The play debuted at the Howard Athenaeum in Boston in September 1867, and had a four week run at the Walnut Street Theatre in Philadelphia in November–December 1867. It also played in Washington, D.C. at the National Theatre in January 1868, played for two weeks in San Francisco, and played in Richmond, Virginia in February 1868, among other places.

By early March 1868, the play's success on the road dictated it would get a run in New York. The play had its New York debut at Wallack's Theatre on June 8, 1868, to open their "summer season," and ran for nine weeks.

Brougham played the role of Irish immigrant to New York, Terence O'Halloran, who leaves a life of crime to become an amateur detective. His nemesis is the anti-Semitic depiction of counterfeiter Mordie Solomons (played by Charles Fisher). "Coal Oil Tommy" was a popular song from the play.

== Original Broadway cast ==
- Terry by John Brougham
- Bob Mawley by Edward Lamb
- Sir William Downe by T.J. Hind
- Oil Tommy by Benjamin T. Ringgold
- Dodges by W.J. Leonard
- Dummy Dennis by J. Quiqley
- Duffy by E. Cashin
- Hawkeye by E. Menturn
- Sam by G. White
- Mordie Solomons by Charles Fisher
- Robert Mordaunt by C.H. Rockwell
- Frank by James McGee
- Polly by Effie Germon
- Miss Tartar by Fanny Morant
- Judy by George Holland
- Emily by Miss M. Barrett
- Marx by Mis F. Carman
- Biddy by Miss C. Carman
- Lucy by Miss E. Monell
- Jenny by Miss J. Day.

== Origin and reception ==
In 1877, Brougham wrote that The Lottery of Life had been the "most profitable" of his plays. He noted that it was "originally written as a burlesque upon the sensation of the time," where he "exaggerated the sensational parts of it, and it was something which I expected would be horrifying," yet "I found it was taken in perfect earnest." Thus, he altered the play somewhat into "a not altogether impossible, though somewhat improbable piece." He opined that the play "is not good enough to win the success it has achieved, and not bad enough to receive the animadversions of the hypercritical."

Upon receiving criticism in Philadelphia, Brougham announced from the stage before a performance that he had written the play not to please critics, but the public who was demanding plays of this type, and that his aim was to make money.

The New York Herald received the play positively in New York, though with no illusions: "According to the legitimate drama of the day this is a first rate plot, especially as it abounds in the latest sensations from beginning to end." It also complimented the New York scenery of the play, and quoted a departing patron as stating "this thing ought to succeed and will succeed, for it is really the legitimate drama of 1868, with all the modern improvements--pretty waiter girls, negro minstrels and all."

By August 1868, the Philadelphia Evening Telegraph reported that "Brougham has already made $1700 out of the piece of trash called "The Lottery of Life." " Nevertheless, Brougham also converted the play into his first novel, which commenced a run in Fireside Companion that same month, and netted him an additional $2,000.

The play saw performances around the United States into the 1890s.

To the extent the play gets any attention in the modern day, it is about the stereotyped Jewish villain of the play, who was also called upon to wear a "false Jewish nose."
