= Walter M. Fleming =

American physician

Walter Millard Fleming
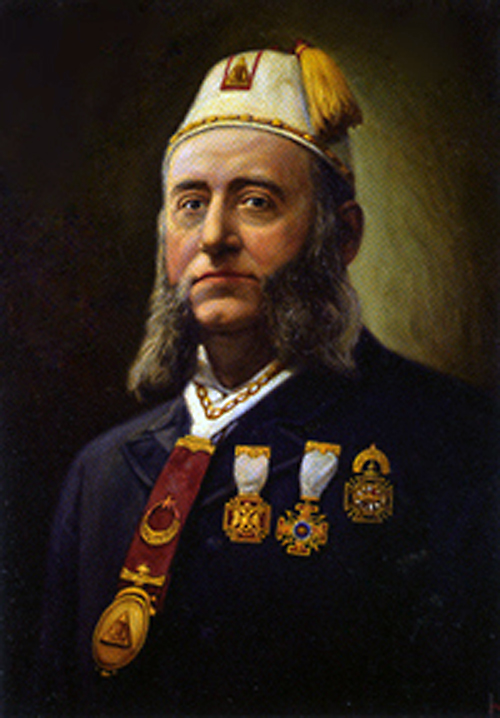
- Born: Walter Millard Fleming; June 13, 1838; Portland, Maine, U.S.
- Died: September 9, 1913 (aged 75); Mt. Vernon, New York, U.S.
- Education: Albany Medical College
- Children: 2

Walter Millard Fleming (June 13, 1838 – September 9, 1913) was an American physician and surgeon. Fleming was the founder, with Billy Florence, of the Ancient Arabic Order Nobles of the Mystic Shrine in 1872.

== Life ==
Fleming was born in Portland, Maine. He was the second son of Lorenzo Dow Fleming, then a clergyman and later a physician practising in Canandaigua and Rochester, and Margaretta Rich. Fleming's grandfather, brother, sister and brother-in-law were also physicians. He lived for a time in Portland, moved to Newark, then to Canandaigua and finally to Rochester. He graduated from Albany Medical College in 1862. He had practised before graduating and was surgeon to the 1st Cavalry Regiment in 1858, surgeon to the 13th New York Infantry Regiment in 1861, and for a time city physician for Rochester. He moved with his family to New York City in 1869. He entered active general practice and became associated with St Francis Hospital, later practicing extensively among members of the theatrical profession and was one of the first physicians associated with the Actors Fund of America. He joined the National Guard in 1870 and was staff surgeon of the Third Brigade with the rank of colonel, becoming major before retiring about 1885 or 1886. He stopped practicing in April 1909 after suffering a stroke and eventually retired to his elder son's home in Mt. Vernon, N.Y.

Fleming was very active in Freemasonry. He was a member of N. Y. Lodge, No. 330; Lafayette Chapter, No. 207; Adelphic Council, No. 7; Past Eminent Commander Columbian Commandery, No. I and was made a thirty-third degree Mason in 1878. Fleming was, with Billy Florence, founder of the Ancient Arabic Order Nobles of the Mystic Shrine in 1872. He was potentate of the first temple (Mecca) for seventeen years and Imperial potentate of the order for twelve years.

Fleming was formerly a member of the New York County Medical Society, the American Medical Association, the Medico-Legal Society, New York State Medical Society, and at one time was president of the Alumni Association of the Albany Medical College; for many years and to his death he was a member of the New York Physicians' Mutual Aid Association, the Royal Arcanum and Knights of Honor. He married Dolly Margaretta Spencer and had two sons with her.

== See also ==
- Shriners
- Parade to Glory by Fred Van Deventer
- History of the Imperial Council Nobles of the Mystic Shrine by William B. Melish
