= Edmund Kean as Brutus =

Painting by James Northcote

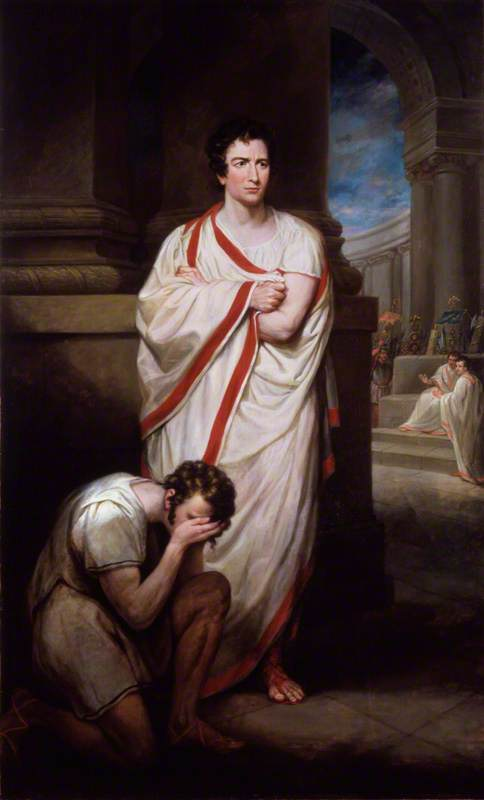
- Artist: James Northcote
- Year: 1819
- Type: Oil on canvas, portrait painting
- Dimensions: 240 cm × 148.2 cm (94 in × 58.3 in)
- Location: National Portrait Gallery, London

Edmund Kean as Brutus is an oil on canvas portrait painting by the British artist James Northcote, from 1819.

== History ==
It depicts the English stage actor Edmund Kean in the title role of the tragedy Brutus (1818) by John Howard Payne. It revolves around the statesman Lucius Junius Brutus, the ancestor of the celebrated assassin of Julius Caesar, known for his role in the overthrow of Tarquinius Superbus and the establishment of the Roman Republic. The role was a popular success for Kean, who is shown with his son Titus, who he has just condemned to death for plotting to restore the king.

The Plymouth-born Northcote was a noted portraitist of the Regency era, having been a pupil of Joshua Reynolds. The work was produced in collaboration with the printmaker Samuel William Reynolds, who produced a mezzotint based on it. The painting is held in the National Portrait Gallery, in London, having been acquired in 1990.

== Bibliography ==
- Ackroyd, Peter. The English Actor: From Medieval to Modern. Reaktion Books, 2023.
- Saywell, David & Simon, Jacob. National Portrait Gallery: Complete Illustrated Catalogue. National Portrait Gallery, 2004.
