= Iowa Corn Song =

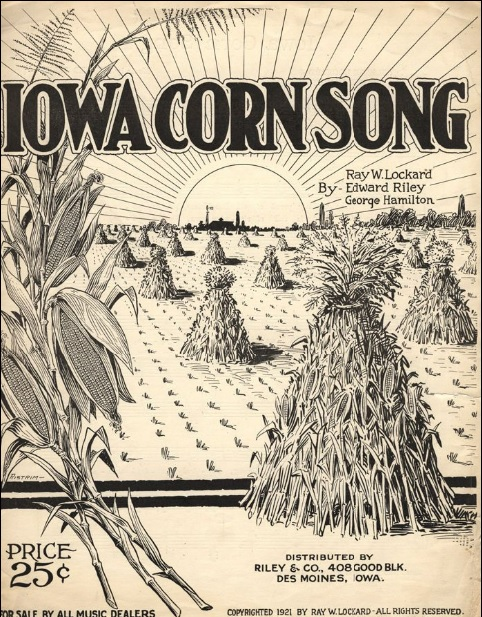

Song
- Released: 1921
- Recorded: 1912
- Songwriter(s): George Hamilton

Audio recording
- 1926 recording of the chorus by the American Legion Band: file; help

The Iowa Corn Song is a 1912 song that was created by the Iowa Shriners. The song was first published in 1921 after more additions were made to it. It has been played often since its creation to this day by various groups and ceremonies. It has also been performed with original renditions by musicians and songwriters like Percy Faith and The Browns.

== History ==
Iowa Shriners decided to write their own Iowa song, after listening to songs about other states at a Shriner Conclave in Los Angeles, California, in 1912. Shriner and Secretary of the Des Moines Chamber of Commerce George Hamilton began the process by writing words to the chorus of the song "Travelling" by George Botsford. English immigrant John Beeston created the musical score for the Shriner band leading the Iowa Corn Song to be popular at the Georgia Conclave. New lyrics were later added by Ray W. Lockard with a musical setting that was developed by Edward Riley. The final version was first published in 1921.

== Reception and legacy ==
A tradition is for singers to raise their arms above their head when the words "tall corn" are sung during the chorus's last line. Volume 12 of Successful Farming in 1922 advertised ordering pieces of music as a Valentine's Day gift with the Iowa Corn Song as a choice. The advertisement stated that "it is the famous Corn song, sung by Iowa delegations at all conventions". Percy Faith performed the song with his orchestra. The song was recorded on an early 20th century phonograph. Al Grady of the Iowa City Press-Citizen said in 1964 that people raised in Iowa have "always considered it the Iowa 'Corny' Song, an American Legion promotion which pictures Iowans as country clods from Coonskin Corners." Grady continued by saying that "maybe we are country clods! Maybe there is a Coonskin Corners ... Think what you will of tradition, the Iowa Corn Song is a very solid little melody with a lot of kick, easily learned, easily hummed, easily whistled and easily sung".
