= John Brougham =

Irish-American actor and dramatist (1814–1880)

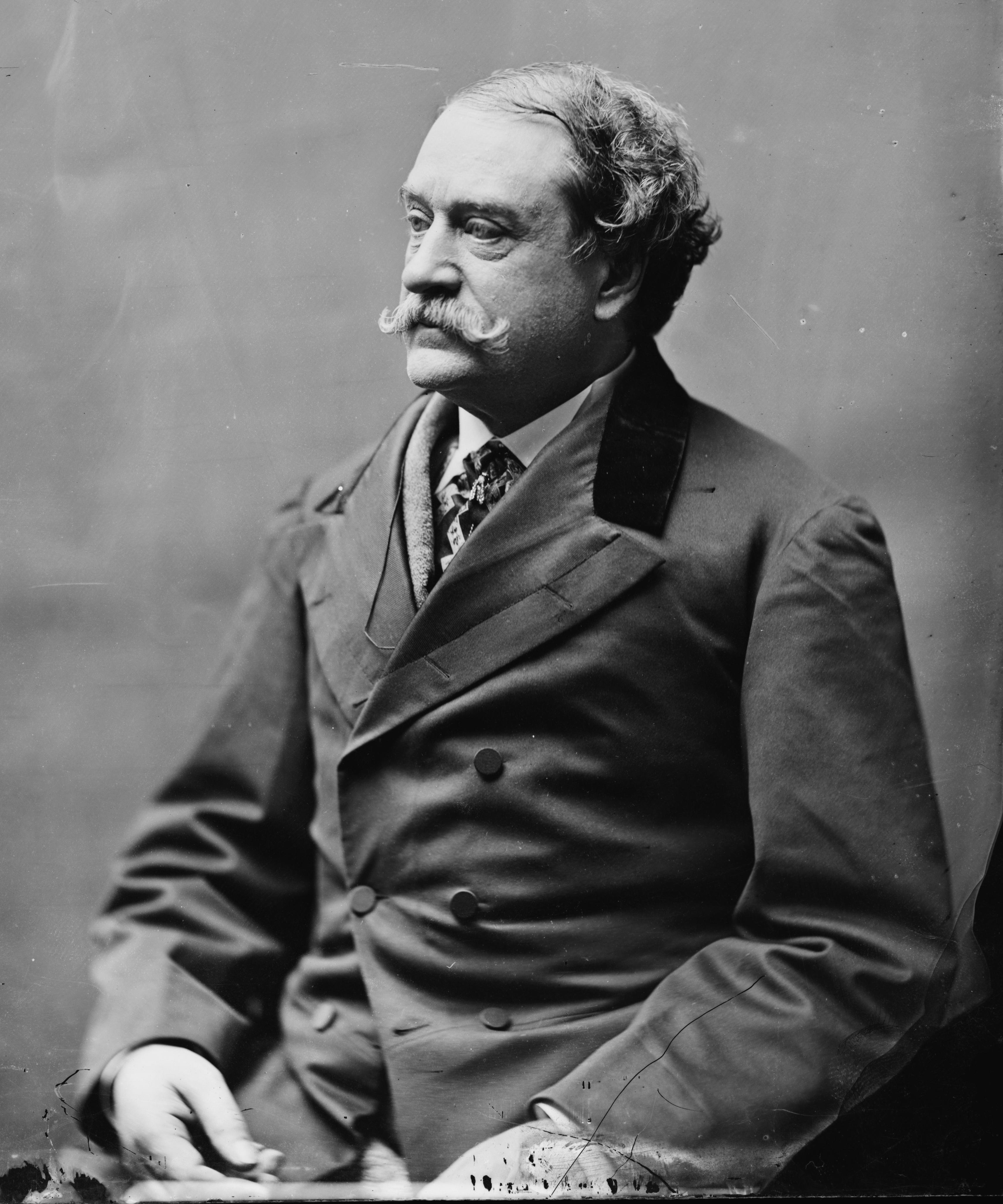
- Born: 9 May 1810; Dublin
- Died: 7 June 1880; New York City
- Occupations: Writer, playwright, poet

John Brougham (9 May 1810/1814 – 7 June 1880) was an Irish and American actor, dramatist, poet, theatre manager, and author. As an actor and dramatist he had most of his career in the United States, where he was celebrated for his portrayals of comic Irish characters.

The author of more than seventy-five dramatic works, with some sources stating more than 150, he was particularly successful in the genres of burlesque and satire. His numerous subversive, satirical stage works earned him the nickname as "The American Aristophanes" among critics. In addition to his work as a playwright, Brougham published two volumes of his miscellaneous writings. These included essays, poems, and other works.

Born and raised primarily in Dublin, Brougham began higher education aiming to become a surgeon. Forced to end his studies, he moved to London in 1830 where he began his career as a professional actor. He staged his first play in that city in 1831. He performed for a decade in the theatre troupe of actress Lucia Elizabeth Vestris and her husband Charles James Mathews, first at the Olympic Theatre and then the Theatre Royal, Covent Garden (now the Royal Opera House).

In 1840 Brougham became manager of the Lyceum Theatre, London. Two years later in 1842 he emigrated to the United States. There he made his stage debut at the Park Theatre, New York City in 1842.

Brougham rapidly became a favorite actor among the American public in a wide range of contemporary plays. He toured the United States in theatre troupes led by the impresarios William Evans Burton and James William Wallack, in addition to appearing on Broadway with some frequency.

During this period he also worked as a theatre manager in New York City, managing such theaters as Niblo's Garden, Brougham's Lyceum Theatre, and the Bowery Theatre. He became a naturalized American citizen in 1844 upon his second marriage, to American actress Annette Hawley. He left the United States at the height of his popularity just prior to the outbreak of the American Civil War. He returned to England in September 1860 to work once again on the London stage.

After further performances in England and Ireland in the first half of the 1860s, Brougham returned to New York City in October 1865, after the end of the war, to join the company of players at the Winter Garden Theatre. By this time his popularity had declined, but he remained active as a performer at the Winter Garden and in the theatre troupe of Augustin Daly until October 1879. He died eight months later in New York City in June 1880.

== Early life and education ==
John Brougham was born in Dublin on 9 May 1810 (Though some sources claim 1814). The eldest of three children, he was the only child in the family to survive to adulthood. His father, an amateur painter, died young. His mother, the daughter of a Protestant French Huguenot, was forced to live in exile due to the politics and religious persecution of her time. She was mired in poverty and arranged for John Brougham to be raised in the home of his uncle.

Brougham was prepared for college at an academy at Trim, County Meath, twenty miles from Dublin. After this he matriculated to Trinity College Dublin; where he acquired a classical education and became involved in student theatrical productions. There he formed interesting and useful associations and acquaintances that assisted him in his later career as an actor and dramatist.

He became acquainted with the actress Lucia Elizabeth Vestris, and became involved with a social set of friends who produced their own plays. They cast parts by drawing names out of a hat. Though Brougham usually traded off larger roles in order to focus on his studies, he was deeply interested in acting. Additionally, he frequently attended performances at the Theatre Royal, Dublin.

Brougham's uncle encouraged his education with the goal of becoming a surgeon. He briefly was a surgical student at Peter Street Hospital. Having fallen into difficult economic conditions, his uncle had to end his financial support and Brougham had to stop his education. In order to support himself financially, he relocated to London in 1830.

== Career ==
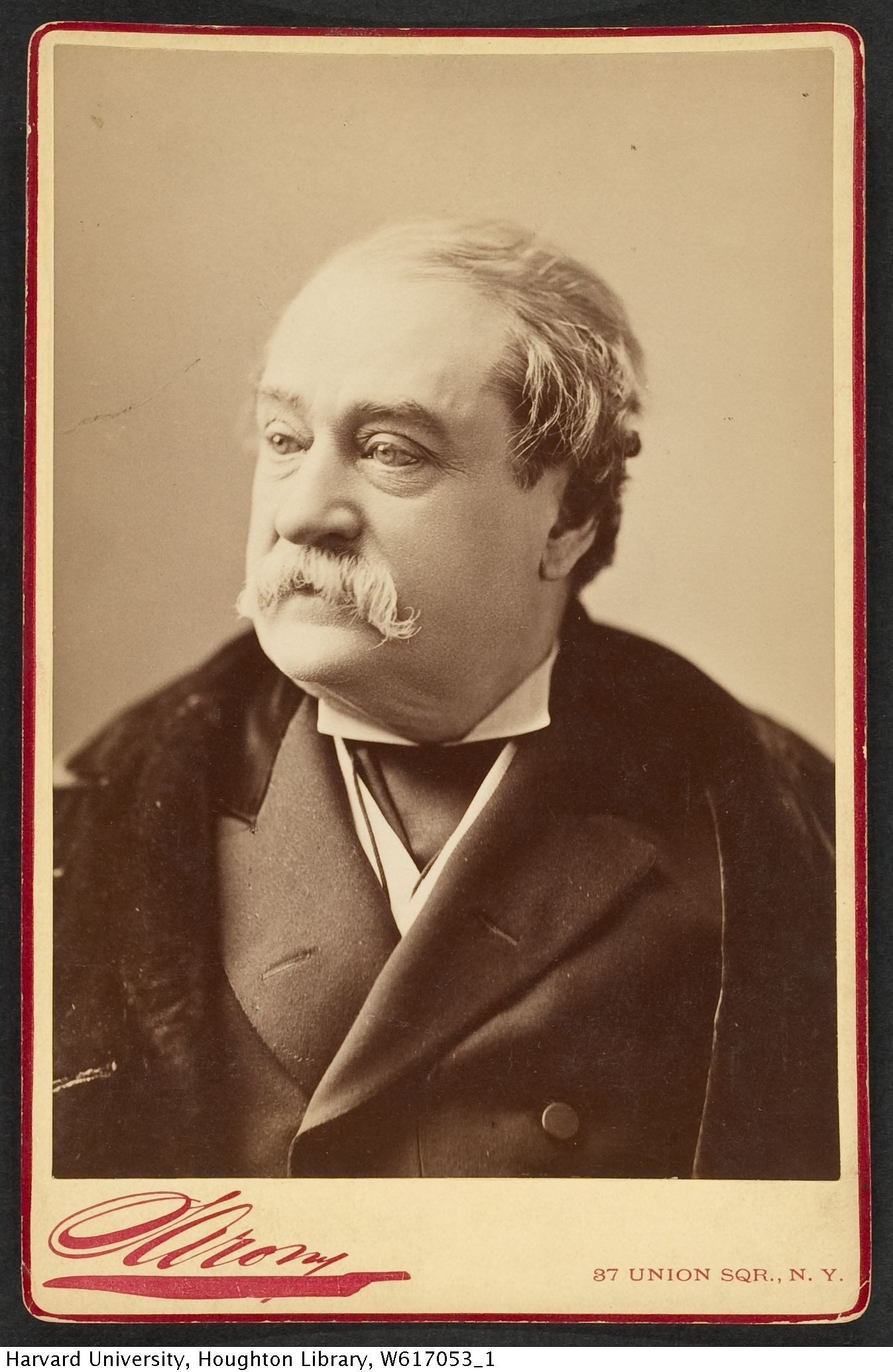
John Brougham, undated

While having a brief experience of living in poverty in London, Brougham had a chance meeting with Lucia Elizabeth Vestri; whom he had befriended earlier at Trinity College. Vestri used her influence as an actress at the Queen's Theatre, Tottenham Court Road to secure Bougham work in that theatre's production of William Thomas Moncrieff's Tom and Jerry. He made his professional London stage debut in July 1930 portraying six characters in that work.

In 1831 Brougham was a member of Vestris's company which was the resident troupe at London's Olympic Theatre, and was managed by Vestris's husband Charles Mathews. He wrote his first play, a burlesque as a starring vehicle for her in 1832. He remained with Madame Vestris's company for a decade; continuing with the organization after it left the Olympic Theatre in 1839 to take up residency at the Theatre Royal, Covent Garden (now the Royal Opera House). With Dion Boucicault he co-authored the 1841 play London Assurance (1841), the role of Dazzle being one of those with which he became associated. However, the relationship between Boucicault and Brougham soured, and after the work premiered Brougham relinquished his authorship rights in a lawsuit settlement and left the production at the Theatre Royal.

In 1840 Brougham was appointed manager of the Lyceum Theatre, London, for which he wrote several light burlesques. In 1842 he moved to the United States, where he made his debut starring in a production of William Bayle Bernard's His Last Legs at the Park Theatre in Manhattan. He became a member of WE Burton's company, for which he wrote several comedies, including Met-a-mora; or, the Last of the Pollywogs, a parody of John A. Stone and Edwin Forrest's Metamora; or The Last of the Wamponoags, and Irish Yankee; or, The Birthday of Freedom.

Later he was the manager of Niblo's Garden, and in 1850 opened Brougham's Lyceum, which, like his next speculation, the lease of the Bowery Theatre, was not a financial success, despite the popularity of such works as Po-ca-hon-tas; or, The Gentle Savage. He was later connected with Wallack's and Daly's theatres, and wrote plays for both. In 1852, he edited a comedic paper, The Lantern, and published two collections of miscellaneous writings, A Basket of Chips and The Bunsby Papers. In 1857, he published A Day in New York.

In 1860 he returned to London, where he adapted or wrote several plays, including The Duke's Motto for Fechter. In November 1864 he appeared at the Theatre Royal in his native Dublin in the first performance of Dion Boucicault's Arrah-na-Pogue with Boucicault, Samuel Johnson and Samuel Anderson Emery in the cast.

After the American Civil War he returned to New York City. Brougham's Theatre was opened in 1869 with his comedies Better Late than Never and Much Ado About a Merchant of Venice, but this managerial experience was also a failure, due to disagreements with his business partner, Jim Fisk, and he took to playing the stock market. His last appearance onstage was in 1879 as "O'Reilly, the detective" in Boucicault's Rescued. He died in Manhattan in 1880.

Brougham was a founding member and first vice president of the Lotos Club in New York (established 1870), and for a time its president.

== Marriages ==
He was twice married, in 1838 to Emma Williams (d. 1865), and, in 1844, to Annette Hawley, daughter of Captain Nelson, R.N., and widow of Mr. Hodges (d. 1870), both actresses.

== Plays ==
Sources vary in stating the number of plays Broughman authored with the Oxford Dictionary of National Biography stating he wrote more the 75 dramatic works, and the Historical Dictionary of American Theater stating he authored more than 150 plays. Broughman was particularly adept at writing satirical comedies, and his significant output of subversive satires earned him the nickname "The American Aristophanes" from critics of the time.

Brougham's 1880 obituary in The New York Tribune listed the following works as his "most conspicuous plays": Life in the Clouds, Love's Livery, Enthusiasm, Thom Thumb the Second, The Demon Gift (with Mark Lemon), Bunsby's Wedding, The Confidence Man, Don Caeser de Bassoon, Vanity Fair, The Irish Yankee, Benjamin Franklin, All's Fair in Love, The Irish Emigrant, Dombey and Son (dramatization), Home, Ambrose Germain, The World's Fair, Faustus, The Spirit of Air, Row at the Lyceum, David Copperfield (dramatization), The Actress of Padua (new version), The Pirates of the Mississippi, The Red Mask, Orion, the Gold-Beater, Tom and Jerry in America, The Miller of New Jersey, The Game of Love, Bleak House (adaptation), My Cousin German, A Decided Case, The Game of Life, Pocahantas, Neptune's Defeat, Love and Murder, Romance and Reality, The Ruling Passion, Playing With Fire, Columbus (burlesque), This House to Be Sold, The Duke's Motto, Bel Demonio, Lady Audley's Secret (adaptation), Only a Clod (adaptation), Better Late than Never, The Emerald Ring, Irish Stew, Much Ado About a Merchant of Venice, The Red Light, Minnie's Luck, John Garth, and The Lily of France.

Other works included The Lottery of Life (1867), and Home Rule, his final work.
