= Madame Ponisi =

American actress (1818–1899)

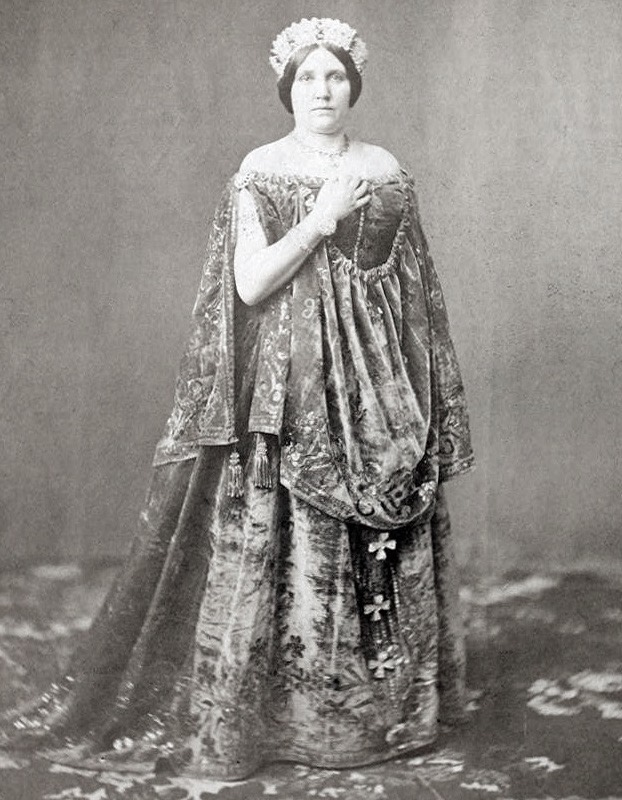
Madame Ponisi

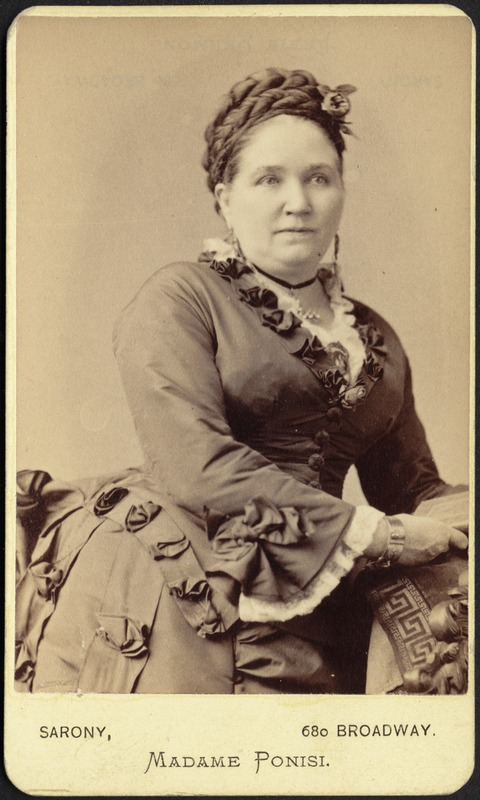
Madame Ponisi

Elizabeth Ponisi Wallis (15 December 1818, Huddersfield, Yorkshire, England – 19 February 1899, Washington, D. C.), née Hansom or Hanson, known throughout her career as Madame Ponisi, was an English-American actress.

At an early age, she made her stage debut at Barnard Castle, Durham, England, as Amy in Father and Son. She made her London debut on 26 December 1848. In September 1850 she sailed for America under a three-month contract with E. A. Marshall, manager of the Walnut Street Theatre in Philadelphia and the Old Broadway Theatre in New York. She made her American debut 7 October 1850, at the former theater, as Marianne in The Wife, by James Sheridan Knowles. She played seven different roles in her first week, and then went to New York. Her debut there, at the Broadway Theatre, occurred on 11 November 1850, as Lady Teazle in The School for Scandal, with William Davidge. She was immediately invited to join the company to play leading roles. She stayed at the theater until its closing, 2 April 1859, on which occasion she played Cleopatra in Shakespeare's tragedy. She supported Edwin Forrest on a number of his starring tours. In 1864 Madame Ponisi made a short starring tour herself with Lady Macbeth as the feature of her repertory. She did not enjoy the roving life, however, and soon returned to New York, where she played special engagements until 1871, when she joined Lester Wallack's company, staying until it was disbanded in 1888. She subsequently acted with Joseph Jefferson and Richard Mansfield.

In her youth she married James Ponisi, a professional actor, whom she divorced in 1856 or 1858. She married Samuel Wallis, the master mechanic of the Broadway Theatre, in 1859, who died in 1884. Her last appearance on any stage was 6 April 1893, when she emerged from retirement for a benefit to her friend and contemporary, Louisa Eldridge.

Her roles included Tabitha Stork in Rosedale, Mrs. Malaprop in The Rivals, the Marquise in Caste, Suzanne in L'Abbé Constantin, Helen Macgregor in Rob Roy, Mrs. Hardcastle in She Stoops to Conquer, Mrs. Cregan in The Colleen Bawn, Sarah Matheson in Patrie, Lady Franklin in Money, Widow O'Kelly in The Shaughraun, Lady Shendryn in Ours, Mrs. Macclesfield in The Gov'nor, the Marquise del Rio Zares in Diplomacy, Countess Pompion in Old Heads and Young Hearts, the Duchess in The Duke's Motto, Francesca da Rimini in George Henry Boker's tragedy of that name, Mrs. Vandam in Oofty-Gooft, Black Eyed Susan in the play of that name, the Duchess of York in Richard III, Desdemona and Emilia in Othello, Volumnia in Coriolanus, Cordelia in King Lear, and Juliet to Charlotte Cushman's Romeo, among others. She played several male characters, including Sir Edward Ardent in The Morning Call, and Romeo.
