= David C. Fischer =

American political advisor

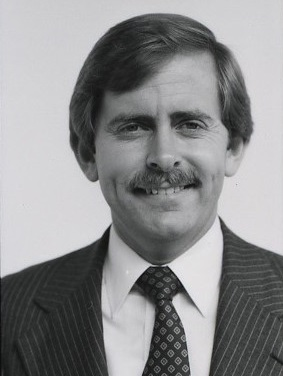
- 1981
- Education: California State Polytechnic University; J. Reuben Clark Law School

David Charles Fischer was Special Assistant to President at the White House under Ronald Reagan from 1981 to 1985. In this capacity Fischer managed the office of the President; liaison to departments and offices within the Executive branch.

Fischer had a bachelor's degree from California State Polytechnic University and a J.D. from the J. Reuben Clark Law School at Brigham Young University. In 1985 he left government employ to become senior vice president and chief administrative officer of Huntsman Chemical Corporation. In 1985 he was appointed United States Commissioner of the Joint US and Canada International Boundary Commission, a position he held until 1991. In 1989 he was a member of the U.S. Delegation to the U.N. Human Rights Commission.

Fischer was President and owner of Nova Packaging Systems, a $50 million manufacturer of pharmaceutical packaging equipment, with plant locations in the U.S. and Great Britain. He led the buyout of DT Packaging Systems and formed Nova Packaging Systems in 2004.

As Chairman and CEO of Cypress Packaging, a Rochester, NY based flexible packaging manufacturer, Fischer led a successful turnaround from a $500,000 loss to profitability in less than one year growing the business from $6 million in revenue to $45 million over six years. He led a successful AFL-CIO union desertification. Cypress Packaging was sold to W.R. Grace in 1996 He also had 4 children.

Fischer received immunity from prosecution in a deal to facilitate his co-operation with the Special Prosecutor and Grand jury in the Iran Contra Affair Investigation although he denied any personal wrongdoing in the case.

Fischer is a Latter-day Saint.
