= Benjamin Edward Woolf =

American dramatist

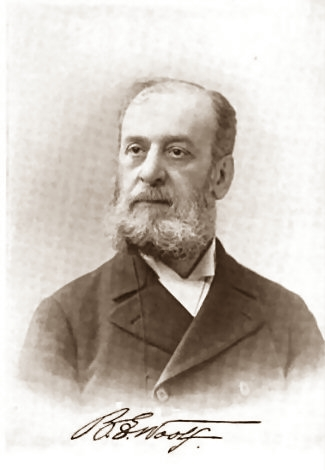
- The Universal Library of Music; 1913
- Born: February 16, 1836; London, England, UK
- Died: February 7, 1901 (aged 64); Boston, Massachusetts, USA
- Other names: B. E. Woolf; Ben Woolf
- Occupations: Composer, playwright and journalist
- Spouse: Josie Orton

Benjamin E. Woolf (February 16, 1836 – February 7, 1901) was a British-born American violinist, composer, playwright, and journalist. His best-known works were the comic operas The Mighty Dollar and Westward Ho.

== Biography ==
Benjamin Wolf was born on February 16, 1836, in London, England, the first of ten children raised by Edward and Sarah Woolf. In the late 1830s Woolf's family immigrated to America where his father, a former orchestra conductor at London's Pavilion Theatre, would lead orchestras in Mobile, Alabama; New Orleans, Louisiana; St. Louis, Missouri; and Philadelphia, Pennsylvania. By 1841 Woolf's family had settled in New York, where his father would become a noted orchestra leader, artist, novelist, humorist, and composer (including of the extravaganza The Naiad Queen). Woolf was trained on the violin by his father and received his early practical experience performing in theater orchestras.

Woolf later rose to become first violinist under the direction of Julius Eichberg at the Boston Museum in Boston, Massachusetts. Woolf and Eichberg would later collaborate on the comic opera Doctor of Alcantara (1862), that was first produced at the Boston Museum in 1879. At some point Woolf left Boston to conduct orchestras in Philadelphia and New Orleans, but returned in 1871 to accept the position of music editor for the Boston Saturday Evening Gazette. Woolf would remain with the Gazette for twenty-three years, where he was eventually elevated to editor and chief. In 1894 he left the Gazette to take charge of the music desk at the Boston Herald, a position Woolf held for the remainder of his life.

Woolf worked on some 62 plays over his career. The Mighty Dollar was written for William J. Florence and debuted at the Park Theatre in New York City on September 6, 1875. The idea of the play, originally titled The Almighty Dollar, came from Malvina Florence's humorous observations of wealthy Americans abroad. Though much maligned by the critics, by 1886 Florence and his wife had performed the play over 2,500 times. In 1880 Woolf's comedy, Lawn Tennis, debuted at the Park Theatre in Boston to positive reviews. It was with this play that actress Marie Jansen first appeared on the professional stage. In 1894 Woolf collaborated with Richard Darwin Ware in Westward Ho, a comic opera about an English aristocrat posing as a Wild West gunslinger and a town in Wyoming run by women. The play opened on December 31, 1894, at the Boston Museum, where it was well received.

Woolf married Josephine Orton (c. 1841–1926) in Boston on March 5, 1862. Known on the stage as Josie Orton, she was for a number of years a leading actress at the Boston Museum, starring in plays such as Arrah-na-Pogue, The Colleen Brawn, and Rosadale.

Woolf died in Boston on February 7, 1901, aged 64.
