= William J. Florence =

American actor and writer (1831–1891)

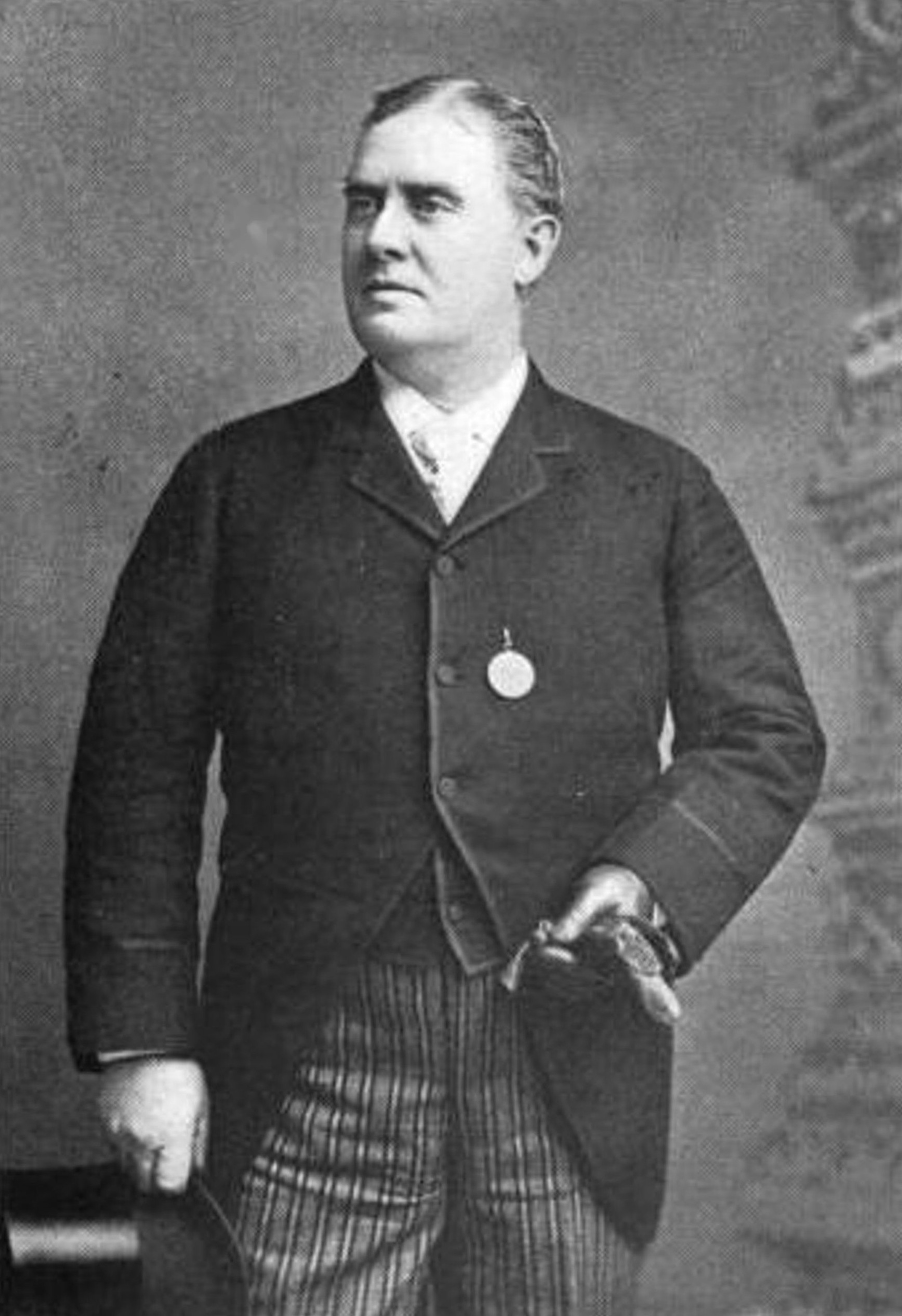
- William J. Florence

Shepherd of The Lambs
- In office 1882–1884
- Preceded by: Harry Beckett
- Succeeded by: John R. Brady

Personal details
- Born: July 26, 1831 Albany, New York, U.S.
- Died: November 19, 1891 (aged 60) Philadelphia, Pennsylvania, U.S.
- Resting place: Green-Wood Cemetery, Brooklyn
- Spouse(s): Anna Teresa Pray; alias Malvina Pray; professionally: Mrs. W. J. Florence (after 1853)
- Occupation: Actor * Author

William Jermyn Conlin (July 26, 1831 – November 19, 1891), better known by his stage name William J. Florence, was an American actor, songwriter, and playwright. Florence awarded the ribbon of the French Societe Histoire Dramatique. He was also co-founder with Walter M. Fleming of the Shriners, a Masonic Order.

== Biography ==
Born of Irish parents and raised in New York City, Florence worked at various jobs before becoming a call boy at the Old Bowery Theater. While working to support his widowed mother and her seven younger children, he rehearsed plays at night, and in 1850 he began to do dialect impersonations. In 1853 he married Malvina Pray, (Note: Sister of actress Maria Pray, wife of actor Barney Williams) and thereafter the two generally appeared together on the stage; he usually as an Irishman and she as a Yankee. Florence gained national prominence with a forty-year career in which he excelled at playing the humorous and poetic Irish character. Ticket-of-Leave Man was presented by him more than one thousand times on national tours. In his later years he partnered with actor Joseph Jefferson as half of a comedy duo.

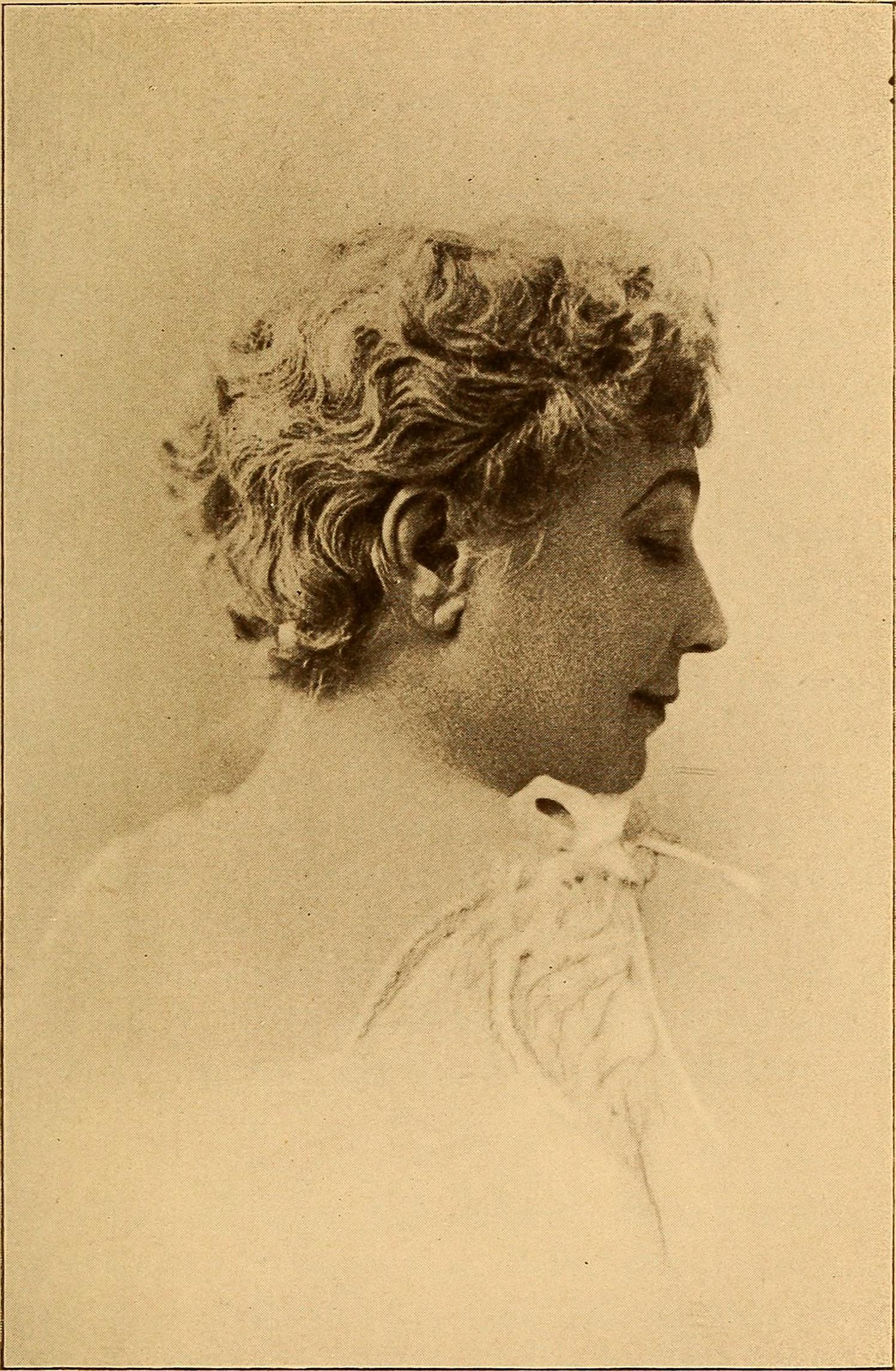
Malvina Pray (c. 1830 – 1906), known famously as Mrs. W. J. Florence

Florence was elected to The Lambs in 1877 or 1878, when the Club was chartered. He was the fourth Shepherd of the Lambs, serving from 1882-1884.

From Malvina's observation of wealthy Americans on vacation abroad, Florence asked Benjamin Edward Woolf to write The Mighty Dollar, that the couple would perform in over 2,500 times during the mid-1870s and well into the 1880s.

Conlin was fond of Florence, Italy, where he had an apartment, and adopted the city for his stage name. At some point after he became famous under this name, he secured the legal right to it.

Florence's first success was in A Row at the Lyceum (1851); following this, he established his reputation as Captain Cuttle in Dombey and Son, Bob Brierly in The Ticket-of-Leave Man, and Sir Lucius O’Trigger in The Rivals. His last appearance was as Zekiel Homespun in a production of Heir-at-Law.

Florence died in Philadelphia on November 19, 1891. The funeral service took place at St. Agnes Roman Catholic Church in New York City.

He is interred at Green-Wood Cemetery in Brooklyn.

According to eyewitness statements, two days before his death Florence received the Sacraments of the Catholic Church, including Holy Communion, from Rev. Father Flanagan of the St. Mary's Church, Philadelphia. To receive these, he must have ceased to be a Mason. He had allegedly renounced Freemasonry in 1876.

== Literature ==
- McKay and Wingate, Famous American Actors of To-Day (New York, 1896)
- Matthews and Hutton, Actors and Actresses of Great Britain and the United States (New York, 1886)
- Winter, The Wallet of Time (New York, 1913)
