= David Nunn Fisher =

English actor and musician

David Fisher
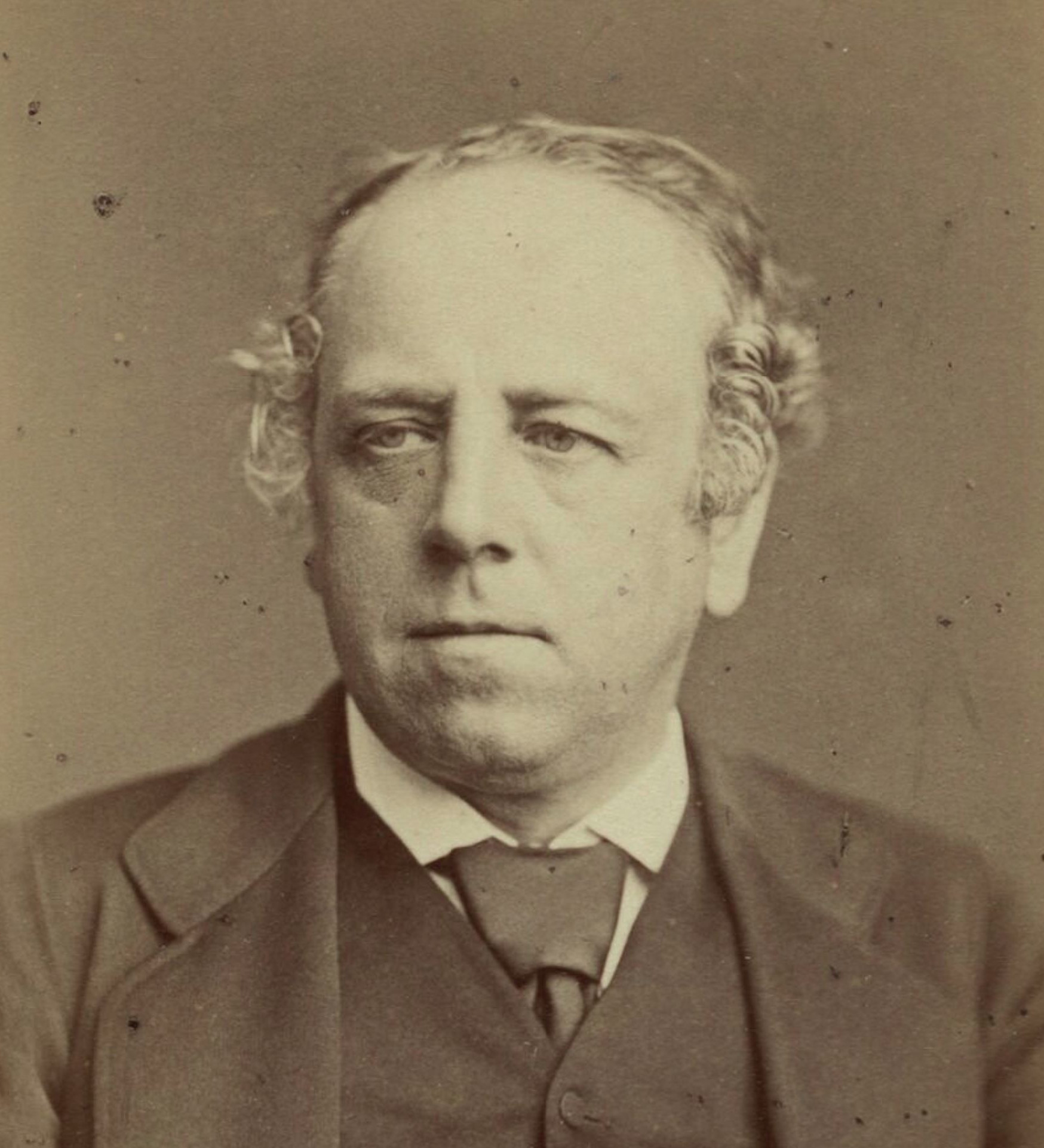
- Photograph of David Nunn Fisher
- Born: July 1816; East Dereham, Norfolk
- Died: 4 October 1887 (aged 71); Camden Town, London
- Burial place: Highgate Cemetery, London
- Occupations: Actor; musician
- Years active: 1853-1884
- Children: 7+ inc. David Fisher IV
- Parents: David Fisher (II) (father); F. B. Bane (mother)

David Nunn Fisher (1816–1887), was an English actor and musician usually known as David Fisher.

== Biography ==
Fisher was born in July 1816 at East Dereham, Norfolk, the first child and only son of David Fisher (II) (1788–1858), actor, musician, and painter, and his first wife F. B. Bane (1788/9–1818).

East Dereham, was a town on a circuit established by his grandfather (David Fisher (I) (1760–1832)), and managed by his father and his uncle. An accident to his leg disqualified him for the stage, and he appeared as principal violinist at local concerts. A recovery, never perfect, enabled him to join the company at the Prince's Theatre, Glasgow. After a stay of four years he appeared 2 November 1853 at the Princess's Theatre, under Charles Kean's management, as Victor in the Lancers, or the Gentleman's Son, an adaptation of Le Fils de Famille of Bayard. During six years he played at this house in various novelties and revivals, including a trifling production from his own pen entitled Music hath Charms (June 1858). In 1859 he joined the Adelphi under B. Webster's management, where he was the original Abbé Latour in the Dead Heart of Watts Phillips. In 1863 he gave, at the Hanover Square Rooms and at St. James's Hall, an entertainment called Facts and Fancies, accompanied by Kate Mellon and Sarah Louisa Kilpack. In the autumn of the same year, he rejoined the Princess's, then under Vining's management. In 1865 he played, at the Haymarket, Orpheus in Blanche's Orpheus in the Haymarket, In 1866–8 he was at Liverpool as stage-manager for Mr. H. J. Byron, playing at The Amphitheatre and the Alexandra Theatre. When the Globe Theatre, London, opened, 28 November 1868, he was the first Major Treherne in Byron's Cyril's Success, He appeared in succession at Drury Lane, the Olympic, the Globe, the Opera Comique, the Criterion, the Mirror (Holborn) Theatre, now destroyed, and the Princess's, playing in pieces by H. J. Byron, Mr. Boucicault, and other writers. His last appearance in London was at the Lyceum in 1884, as Sir Toby Belch. After that period he played in the country.

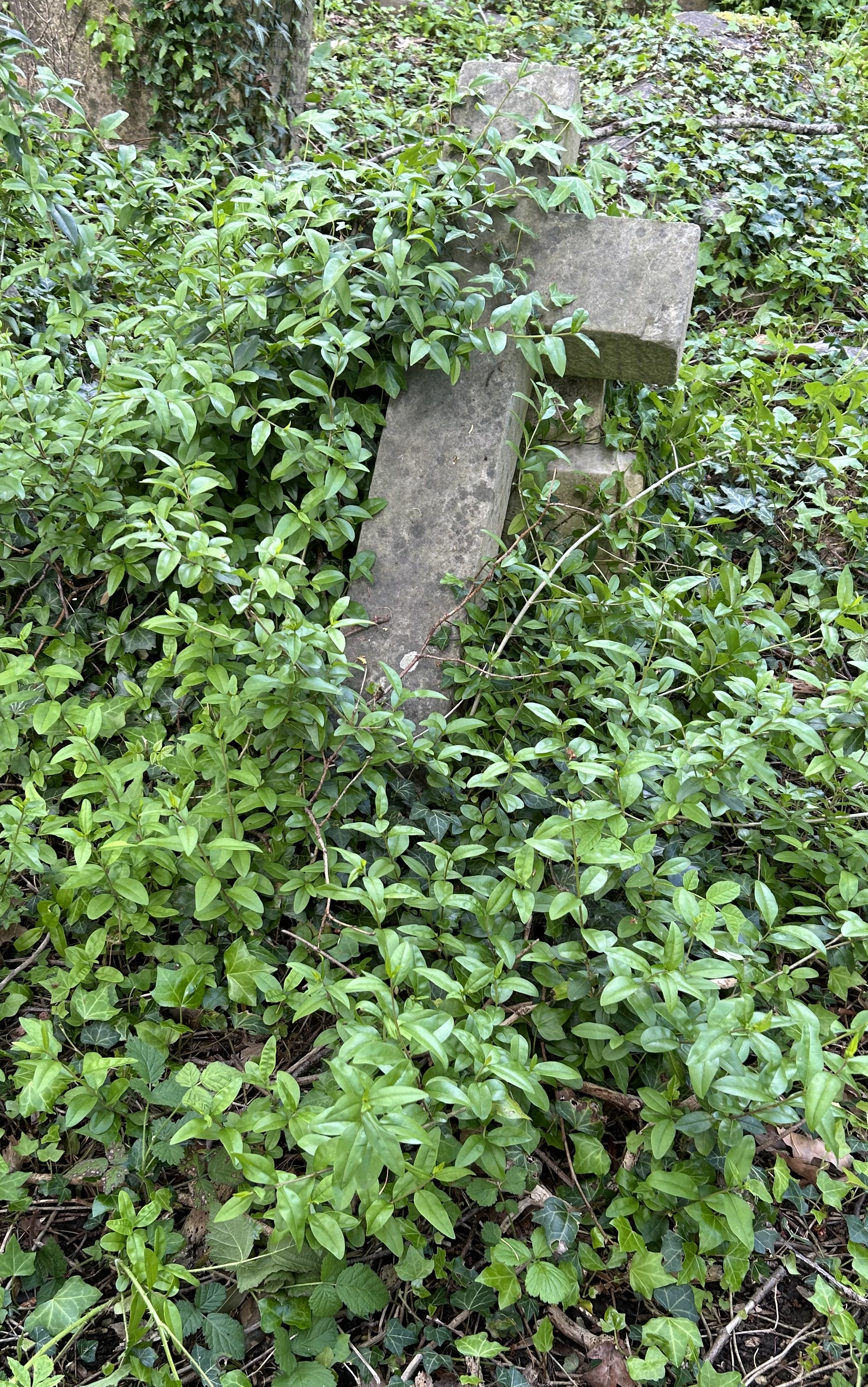
Grave of David Nunn Fisher in Highgate Cemetery

He died in St. Augustine's Road, Camden Town, on 4 October 1887, and was buried at Highgate cemetery. The Era says that not a single actor attended his funeral.

== Assessment ==
Fisher was below the middle height, a stiff-built man, who tried to conceal his lameness by a dancing-master elegance. Concerning his Abbé Latour, John Oxenford said in the Times that "he came to the Adelphi a second-rate eccentric comedian, and showed himself an able supporter of the serious drama". He left a son on the stage, who perpetuated the name of David Fisher borne by at least four generations of actors.

== Family ==
- Walter David Fisher (1845–1889), followed in the steps of his father, grandfather and great-grandfather, in being known as David Fisher and having a career in the theatre. He made his name as a comic actor, initially playing Major-General Stanley in Gilbert and Sullivan's The Pirates of Penzance.
