= David Fisher (II) =

English stage actor

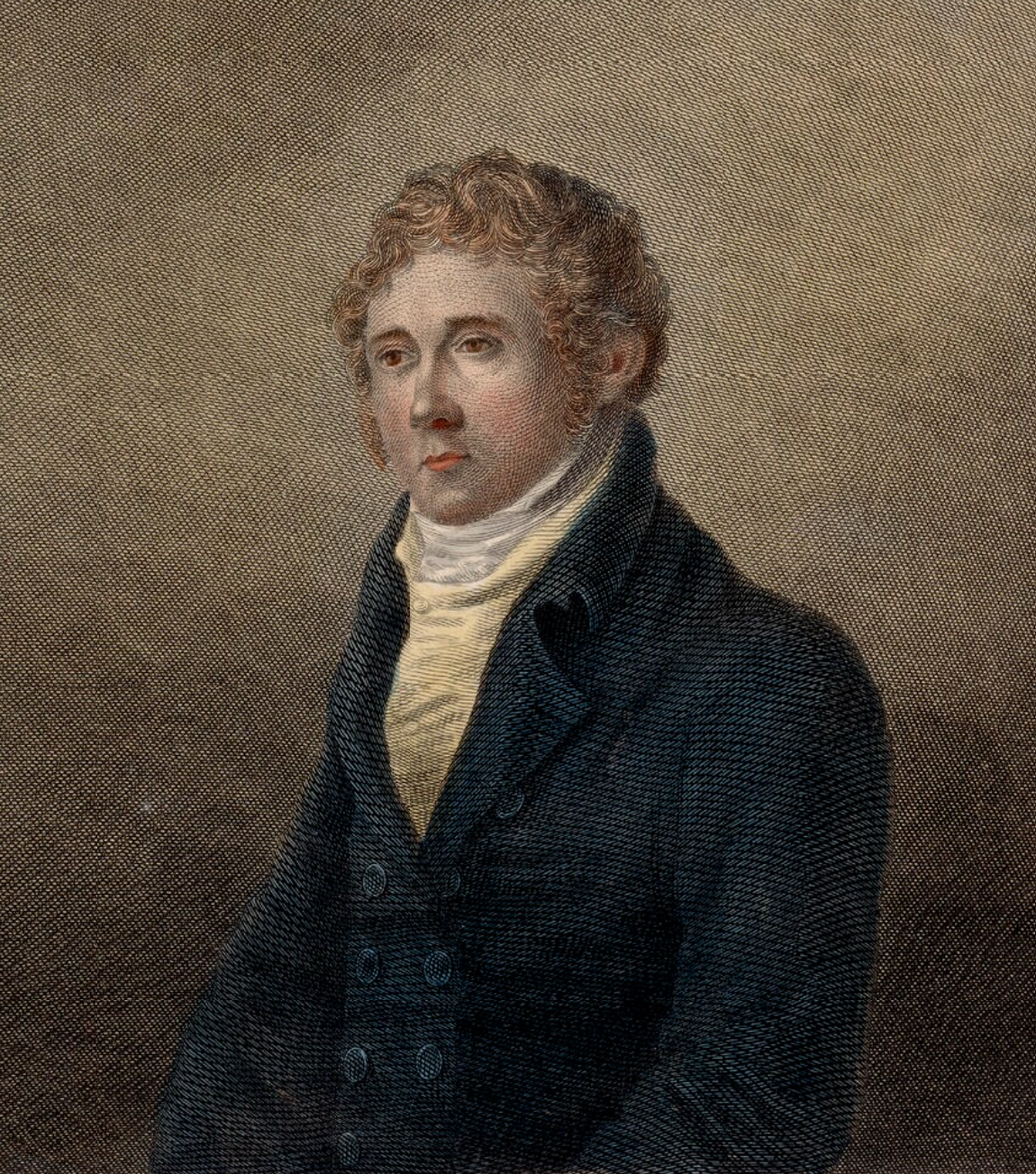
- 1818 engraving of David Fisher by J.G. Walker
- Born: 29 December 1788; Norwich, Norfolk, England
- Died: 20 August 1858 (aged 69); Woodbridge, Suffolk, England
- Occupations: Actor; theatre manager
- Spouses: Francis Barker Bane (m. 1815; died 1818); Sarah Howard (m. 1824, died 1820s)
- Partner: Mary Wilson
- Children: David Fisher (III); Elizabeth Fisher; Sarah Fisher; Harriet Fisher
- Parents: David Fisher (I) (father); Elizabeth Burrell (mother)

David Fisher (II) (1788–1858) was an English actor, and one of the managers of Fisher's company, which had a monopoly of the Suffolk theatres.

== Biography ==
David Fisher was born on 29 December 1788 in St Giles's, Norwich, the eldest of the five surviving children of David Fisher (I) (1760–1832), who was at that time a singer and actor at the Norwich Theatre Royal, and his wife, Elizabeth, née Burrell (1761/2–1814), an actress.

Fisher made his first appearance in London at Drury Lane, as Macbeth, 3 December 1817. This was followed on the 5th by Richard III, and on the 10th by Hamlet. The recovery from illness of Edmund Kean arrested his career. On 24 September 1818, at Drury Lane, then under Stephen Kemble, he played Jaffier in Venice Preserved, Subsequently, he appeared as Lord Townly in The Provoked Husband, and Pyrrhus in Orestes, He was the original Titus in John Howard Payne's Brutus, 3 December 1818, and Angelo in Buck's Italians, or the Fatal Accusation, 3 April 1819. He failed to establish any strong position, and discovered at the close of the second season that his presence was necessary on the Suffolk circuit. On 7 November 1823 he appeared at Bath in 'Hamlet', and subsequently as Shylock, Leon, and Jaffier. He was pronounced a sound actor, but with no claim to genius, and failed to please. Returning again to the eastern counties, he built theatres at Bungay, Beccles, Halesworth, Eye, Lowestoft, Dereham, North Walsham, and other places. About 1838 he retired to Woodbridge, where he died 20 August 1858. He was a musician and a scene-painter, and in the former capacity was leader for some time of the Norwich choral concerts.
