= David Fisher (I) =

English stage actor and theatre manager

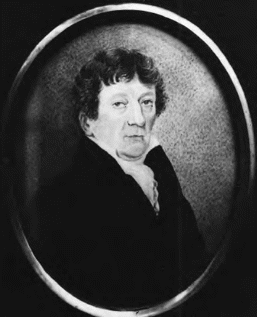
- Born: 26 August 1760; Norwich, Norfolk, England
- Died: 6 August 1832 (aged 71); East Dereham, Norfolk, England
- Occupations: Actor; theatre manager
- Spouse: Elizabeth Burrell (m. 1788; died 1814)
- Children: David Fisher; Charles Fisher; George Fisher; Henry Fisher; Elizabeth Fisher
- Parents: David Fisher (father); Mary West (mother)

David Fisher (I) (26 December 1760 – 6 August 1832) was an English actor and theatre manager.

== Biography ==
Fisher came from a family of farmers from Hethersett, near Norwich, who had been farming there for about 100 years. His father, David Fisher (1729–1782), a craftsman, and his mother Mary, née West (1730–1819) lived in Norwich. Fisher was born on 26 December 1760. He was the eldest son and the third of the eleven children. After he had finished school he trained as a carpenter. He performed in some amateur dramatics. As he was handsome, and had a fine tenor voice, he attracted the attention of Giles Barrett, the manager of the Norwich Theatre Royal. After a trial appearance he was engaged by Barrett as a singer.

During the 1780s Fisher's fame in and around Norwich grew and by 1788, he felt secure enough to marry. With a growing family he took the bold step in 1792 to branch out on his own and purchased a large share in a touring company owned and managed by William Scraggs, taking on the management of it. Initially the company was in competition with several other troupes, but Fisher took a more business like approach (for example paying bills promptly) and taking care of his staff of twenty or more (most of them members of the Fisher or Scraggs families but with a leaven of other professional actors), and had better equipment such as scenery (which most other touring theatres in the region did not have), and a much larger collection of good quality costumes, so gradually the competition withered away, which left north East Anglia his.

Fisher catered to all classes but his decisions as to where to visit and how long to stay were made on the number of gentry and noble seats in a region, as they were the ones who would pay a premium price to be entertained. When he was to open at a location he found it advantageous to deliver advertisements to every large house within a 6-mile radius of his location.

By the early 1800 Fisher had established a profitable two year circuit. Over the next decade the Scraggs gradually left the company: William and his wife died and their son left to set up on his own. In the 1810s Fisher decided that his company was profitable enough that instead of setting up his plays in inadequate play houses, he could start to build his own theatres. In 1812 he completed his first two, one in Lowestoft, in north Suffolk, and the other in Wells next the Sea on the north Norfolk coast. Over the next sixteen years, usually raising capital with share offerings to local patrons, he opened theatres in Halesworth (1812), Woodbridge (1814), Eye (1815), East Dereham (1816), Sudbury (1817), Thetford (1818), Beccles (1819), Swaffham (1822), Newmarket (1825), Bungay (1828), and North Walsham (1828). The theatres were rebuilds or new theatres, with two exceptions Halesworth and Sudbury. His theatres were of his own design to fit his companies needs. Critics considered them comfortable, neat, elegant and practical.

Fisher retired from managing the company and theatres in 1827. He passed managerial control to his three sons and the theatres were left in trust to his three nephews. He carried on acting until 3 August 1832 just three days before he died. He left a legacy of a family acting tradition which lasted for over 150 years.

== Family ==
On 16 March 1788 Fisher married Elizabeth Burrell (c. 1762–1814). After their marriage she joined him on stage, becoming a member of the same company. They had five children, of whom their daughter Elizabeth and youngest son Henry died young. The three other boys were David (1788–1858), Charles (1792–1869), and George (1793–1864). They were initially placed in local school, but then because of the family's itinerant lifestyle were later sent to a boarding school in Whittlesey, Cambridgeshire. In addition the children received extra tuition in French, dancing and music. They all followed their parents into the theatre.
