= William B. Helmreich =

American sociologist (1945–2020)

William Benno Helmreich
- Born: August 25, 1945; Zurich, Switzerland
- Died: March 28, 2020 (aged 74); Great Neck, New York
- Awards: National Jewish Book Award for Contemporary Jewish Life & Practice, 2015 GANYC Award for Outstanding Achievement in Book Writing

Academic background
- Education: Yeshiva University (BA); Washington University in St. Louis (MA, PhD)

Academic work
- Discipline: Sociology

William Helmreich (August 25, 1945 – March 28, 2020) was a Swiss-born American professor of sociology at the City College of New York Colin Powell School for Civic and Global Leadership and the Graduate Center of the City University of New York. He was also a published author.

Helmreich was a distinguished professor of sociology at the City University of New York who specialized in race and ethnic relations, religion, immigration, risk behavior, the sociology of New York City, urban sociology, consumer behavior, and market research.

== Early life ==
Helmreich was born in 1945 in Zürich, Switzerland, the son of Holocaust survivor parents. In 1946, he was brought to the US as an infant, and grew up in New York City on Manhattan’s Upper West Side. He studied in the Ner Yisroel and Kamenitz Yeshivas.

His undergraduate work was done at Yeshiva University and his graduate work at Washington University in St. Louis. He wrote his dissertation on civil rights and African American militant groups.

== Career ==
Beginning in the 1970s and until he passed away he worked in the sociology department of City College.

Helmreich wrote about his early years in a book he named "Wake Up, Wake Up, to Do the Work of the Creator" (a phrase spoken in Yiddish by those who went house-to-house to awaken worshippers for daily prayer).

What is considered his "seminal" book is “The World of the Yeshiva: An Intimate Portrait of Orthodox Jewry”, written in 1982 after interviewing the heads of many yeshivot. When asked about recordings of "many of the famous roshei yeshiva of yesteryear" whom he interviewed, "Do you still have the recordings?" he replied "At one time I thought I did, but it seems that all I have are the transcripts." In 1983 he donated 16 transcripts to his alma mater, Yeshiva University.

He wrote 18 books and walked 6000 miles throughout New York City, which became the subject of several of his books.

=== Works ===
- The Black Crusaders: A Case Study of a Black Militant Organization (1973)
- Afro-Americans and Africa: Black Nationalism at the Crossroads (1977)
- Wake Up, Wake Up, to Do the Work of the Creator (1976)
- The Things They Say behind Your Back: Stereotypes and the Myths Behind Them (1982)
- The World of the Yeshiva (1982)
- Flight Path (1989)
- Contemporary Issues in Society (together with Hugh F. Lena) (1991)
- Against All Odds: Holocaust Survivors and the Successful Lives they Made in America (1992)
- Letters from Tel Mond Prison: An Israeli Settler Defends His Act of Terror (together with Era Rappaport) (1996)
- The Enduring Community: The Jews of Newark and Metrowest (1998)
- What Was I Thinking: The Dumb Things We Do and How to Avoid Them. (2010)
- The New York Nobody Knows, Walking 6,000 Miles in the City (2013)
- The Brooklyn Nobody Knows: An Urban Walking Guide (2016)
- The Manhattan Nobody Knows: An Urban Walking Guide (2018)
- The Queens Nobody Knows: An Urban Walking Guide (2020)
- The Bronx Nobody Knows: An Urban Walking Guide (2023)
- Saving Children: Diary of a Buchenwald Survivor and Rescuer (together with Jack Werbner) (2017)
- The Jewish Condition: Challenges and Responses-1938-2008 (Editor with Rosenblum and Schimel) (2017)

==== The World of the Yeshiva ====
Helmreich revised his 1982 The World of the Yeshiva 18 years later by comparing sociological changes "among the strictly Orthodox" since his 1980 research. Two areas about the new edition highlighted by The New York Times are the doubling in those doing full-time "collegiate and graduate"-level religious studies and population growth.

== Death ==
Helmreich died March 28, 2020, at age 74 of COVID-19 in Great Neck, New York.
