= Kevin C. Fitzpatrick =

American writer and historian

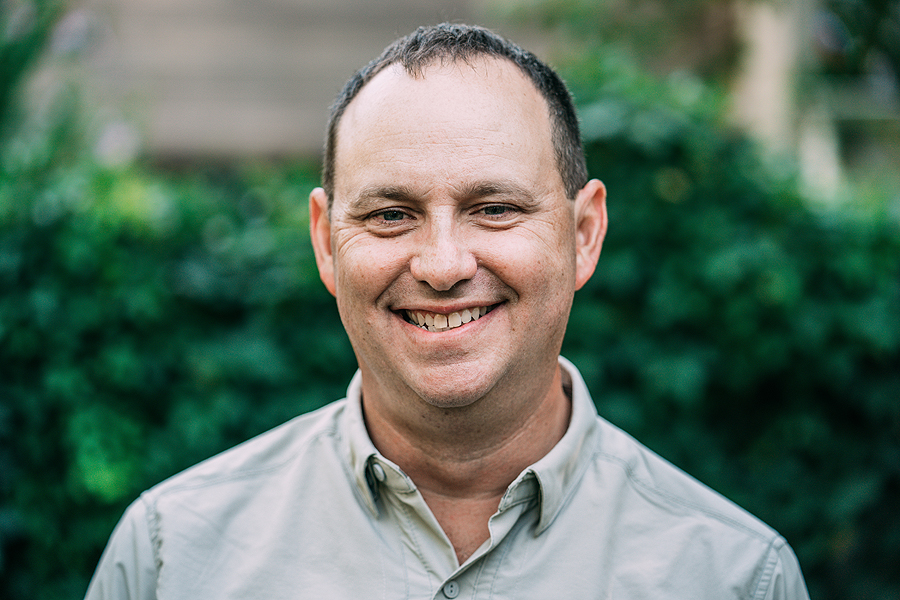
- Kevin C. Fitzpatrick

Shepherd of The Lambs
- Incumbent
- Assumed office 2023
- Preceded by: Marc Baron

Personal details
- Born: January 10, 1966 Baltimore, Maryland, U.S.
- Spouse: Christina Hensler
- Occupation: Author * Historian

Kevin C. Fitzpatrick (born January 10, 1966), is an American historian and non-fiction writer. He is best known for his research and writings on Dorothy Parker and the Algonquin Round Table.

== Early life ==
Fitzpatrick was born in Baltimore, Maryland in 1966, but spent his childhood in Bethlehem, Pennsylvania; Summit, New Jersey; Raleigh, North Carolina; and St. Louis, Missouri. He is a graduate of Truman State University (formerly Northeast Missouri State University). While a student at NMSU Fitzpatrick co-founded The Pundit, an independent newspaper that served primarily the student population and young adults of the Kirksville, Missouri area. He served six years in the U.S. Marine Corps Reserves as a journalist-photographer.

== Career ==
Fitzpatrick has had a varied multimedia career including newspapers, television, advertising agencies, magazines, and more recently web-based publishing and editing. In the latter he has produced close to 75 websites and written for numerous trade publications. When not involved with media pursuits, Fitzpatrick is a certified New York City sightseeing guide, giving walking tours of historic locations, landmarks, cemeteries and drinking establishments. He is also a frequent guest speaker at libraries and literary clubs. Fitzpatrick cites among his biggest influences Dorothy Parker, Robert Benchley, Franklin P. Adams, and Stanley Walker. Fitzpatrick produces the award-winning dorothyparker.com, which he launched in 1998. He is the president of the Dorothy Parker Society, which he founded in 1999. He was also instrumental in the effort to get Dorothy Parker's birthplace in Long Branch, New Jersey, named a National Literary Landmark by Friends of Libraries USA. Fitzpatrick oversaw the creation of a bronze memorial plaque that was unveiled in August 2005 in Parker's hometown. In 2020 Fitzpatrick brought Parker's ashes from Baltimore to New York City and interred them Woodlawn Cemetery. On August 23, 2021, he unveiled a new gravestone for Parker's family.

In conjunction with the Algonquin Hotel, Fitzpatrick leads walking tours of the former Algonquin Round Table homes and haunts in Manhattan. In 2009 Fitzpatrick founded Donald Books, a small independent publishing company.

== Books ==
Year	Title	Publisher
2025	Dorothy Parker's New York, Third Expanded Edition	SUNY Press, Albany, NY
2019	111 Places in The Bronx That You Must Not Miss	Emons Verlag, Cologne
2017	World War I New York: A Guide to the city's Enduring Ties to the Great War	Globe Pequot Press, Guilford, CT
2016	The Governors Island Explorer's Guide	Globe Pequot Press, Guilford, CT
2015	The Algonquin Round Table New York: A Historical Guide	Globe Pequot Press, Guilford, CT
2013	Under the Table: A Dorothy Parker Cocktail Guide	Globe Pequot Press, Guilford, CT
2014	Dorothy Parker Complete Broadway, 1918-1923 (editor)	Donald Books, New York, NY
2009	The Lost Algonquin Round Table: Humor, Fiction, Journalism, Criticism and Poetry from America's Most Famous Literary Circle (co-editor)	Donald Books, New York, NY
2004	A Journey into Dorothy Parker's New York	Roaring Forties Press, Berkeley, CA

== The Lambs ==
Fitzpatrick was elected to The Lambs Theatre Club in May 2015, and became shepherd in 2023.

== Personal life ==
Fitzpatrick and his family reside in Manhattan and the Town of Shelter Island.

== Awards ==
Year	Award	Category	Reference
2018	GANYC Apple Award	Outstanding Achievement in Book Writing: Non Fiction, World War I New York: A Guide to the City's Enduring Ties to the Great War	Guides Association for New York City
2019	GANYC Apple Award	Outstanding Achievement in Radio Program or Podcast (Audio/Spoken Word), Joanna and Kevin's Big Show Podcast	Guides Association for New York City
2020	GANYC Apple Award	Outstanding Achievement in Book Writing: Non Fiction, 111 Places In The Bronx That You Must Not Miss	Guides Association for New York City

== Selected works ==
- 111 Places in the Bronx That You Must Not Miss (ISBN 978-3-7408-0492-3) from Emons-Verlag
- World War I New York: A Guide to the City's Enduring Ties to the Great War (ISBN 978-3-7408-0492-3) from Globe Pequot Press
- The Algonquin Round Table New York: A Historical Guide (ISBN 978-1-4930-4944-8) from Lyons Press
- The Governors Island Explorer's Guide (ISBN 978-1-4930-1966-3) from Globe Pequot Press
- Under the Table: A Dorothy Parker Cocktail Guide (ISBN 978-0-7627-9268-9) from Lyons Press
- A Journey into Dorothy Parker’s New York (ISBN 0-9766706-0-7) from Roaring Forties Press
- Dorothy Parker Complete Broadway, 1918-1923 (ISBN 978-1-4917-2267-1) from Donald Books
- The Lost Algonquin Round Table: Humor, Fiction, Journalism, Criticism and Poetry From America’s Most Famous Literary Circle (ISBN 978-1-4401-5152-1) from Donald Books
