= Henry James Montague =

British-American actor (1843–1878)

- Montague in 1875

Shepherd of The Lambs
- In office 1874–1878
- Succeeded by: Lester Wallack

Personal details
- Born: Henry John Mann; 20 January 1843 Staffordshire, England
- Died: 11 August 1878 (aged 35) San Francisco, California, U.S.
- Resting place: Green-Wood Cemetery, Brooklyn, NY
- Occupation: Actor

Henry James Montague was the stage name of Henry John Mann (20 January 1843 – 11 August 1878), an American actor born in England.

== Biography ==
Montague was born 20 January 1843, in Staffordshire, England.

After playing as an amateur he appeared at Astley's Theatre under Dion Boucicault, enacting on 26 January 1863, the Junior Counsel for the Defence in the Trial of Elfie Deans, extracted by Boucicault from the Heart of Midlothian. At the St James's Theatre on 11 January 1864, he appeared with Charles Mathews in the Adventures of a Love Letter, an adaptation of Sardou's Pattes de Mouche, was Faust in F. C. Burnand's burlesque Faust and Marguerite, 9 July, and 1 October, Christopher Larkins in Woodcock's Little Game.

On 29 June 1865 he was the original Launcelot Darrell, a murderer, in Eleanor's Victory, adapted from Miss Braddon by John Oxenford; at the Olympic, 9 December, the original Clement Austin in Henry Dunbar, or the Outcast, adapted by Tom Taylor from L'Ouvriere de Londres, itself founded by M. Hostein on Miss Braddon's novel; on 25 April 1866 was the first Sir Charles Ormond in Leicester Silk Buckingham's Love's Martyrdom ; and on 27 September 1866, the first Captain Trevor in Tom Taylor's Whiteboy. On the production of Wilkie Collins's Frozen Deep, 27 October 1866, he was Frank Aldersley, and he played Mars in Burnand's burlesque Olympic Games on 25 May 1867.

Montague's first appearance at the Prince of Wales Theatre under the Bancroft management took place as Dick Heartley, an original part, in Boucicault's How she loves him, 21 December 1867, and Frank Price in Robertson's Play followed, 15 February 1868. At the Princess's, 12 August 1868, he was the original Sir George Medhurst in After Dark, an adaptation by Boucicault of Les Oiseaux de Proie of D'Ennery and Grange. Back at the Prince of Wales's he was, 12 December 1868, the original Waverham in Mr. Edmund Yates's Tame Cats, and on 16 January 1869 made his first distinct mark as Lord Beaufoy in Robertson's School.

In partnership with David James and Thomas Thorne, he opened the Vaudeville Theatre on 16 April 1870, speaking an address by Shirley Brooks, and playing George Anderson in Andrew Halliday's comedy For Love or Money. In Albery's Two Roses, 4 June 1870, he made a hit as Jack Wyatt to the Digby Grant of Henry Irving. In 1871 he seceded from the management, and became sole lessee of the Globe, opening 7 October 1871 with Henry James Byron's Partners for Life, in which he played Tom Gilroy, a young barrister. Here he played numerous original parts, among which were: Claude Redruth in Albery's Forgiven, 9 March 1872; Walker in Byron's Spur of the Moment, founded on Hooke's Gilbert Gurney, 4 May 1872; Lord Chilton in Frank Marshall's False Shame, 4 November 1872; Wilfrid Cumberledge in Tears, Idle Tears, adapted by Clement Scott from the Marcel of Jules Sandeau, 4 December 1872; King Raymond in Albery's Oriana, 5 February 1873; Sir Henry Gaisford in Byron's Fine Feathers, 26 April 1873; Toots in Heart's Delight, adapted by Halliday from Dombey and Son, 17 December 1873; and Alfred Trimble in Committed for Trial, W. S. Gilbert's adaptation of Le Reveillon, 24 January 1874. This was the last original character he played in England.

He had also been seen in The Liar, had played Max Harkaway in London Assurance, Cyril in Byron's Cyril's Success, Felix in Jerrold's Time works Wonders, John Hawksley in Still Waters run deep and Claude Melnotte in the Lady of Lyons. He also gave dramatic readings at Hanover Square Rooms.

Lester Wallack took him to the United States in 1874.

Montague was a founding member of The Lambs, an actors' club founded in London in 1869, and became its Shepherd (president) in 1873. He became the first Shepherd of The Lambs in New York, in 1874.

He played the role of Captain Molineux in the premiere of The Shaughraun in 1874 and later appeared in Caste, Diplomacy, and The Overland Route.

In 1875 Montague was sued by an actress, Rose Massey, for breach of promise to marry. The case ended once Montague died. He was in London in 1876, and assumed for a benefit, 27 July 1876, his original part of Jack Wyatt in Two Roses.

Montague subsequently returned to America, and died at The Palace Hotel in San Francisco on 11 August 1878 succumbing to hemorrhage of the lungs brought on by a severe cold which turned into pneumonia. His last words to those around him were, "It's no use; I am going, boys. God bless you all." He had been playing the role of Lord Arthur Chilton in False Shame.

Despite a frequently expressed desire to be buried in England, he was laid to rest in Green-Wood Cemetery on 21 August 1878.
