= Glass Blowers of Murano =

1886 painting by Charles Frederic Ulrich

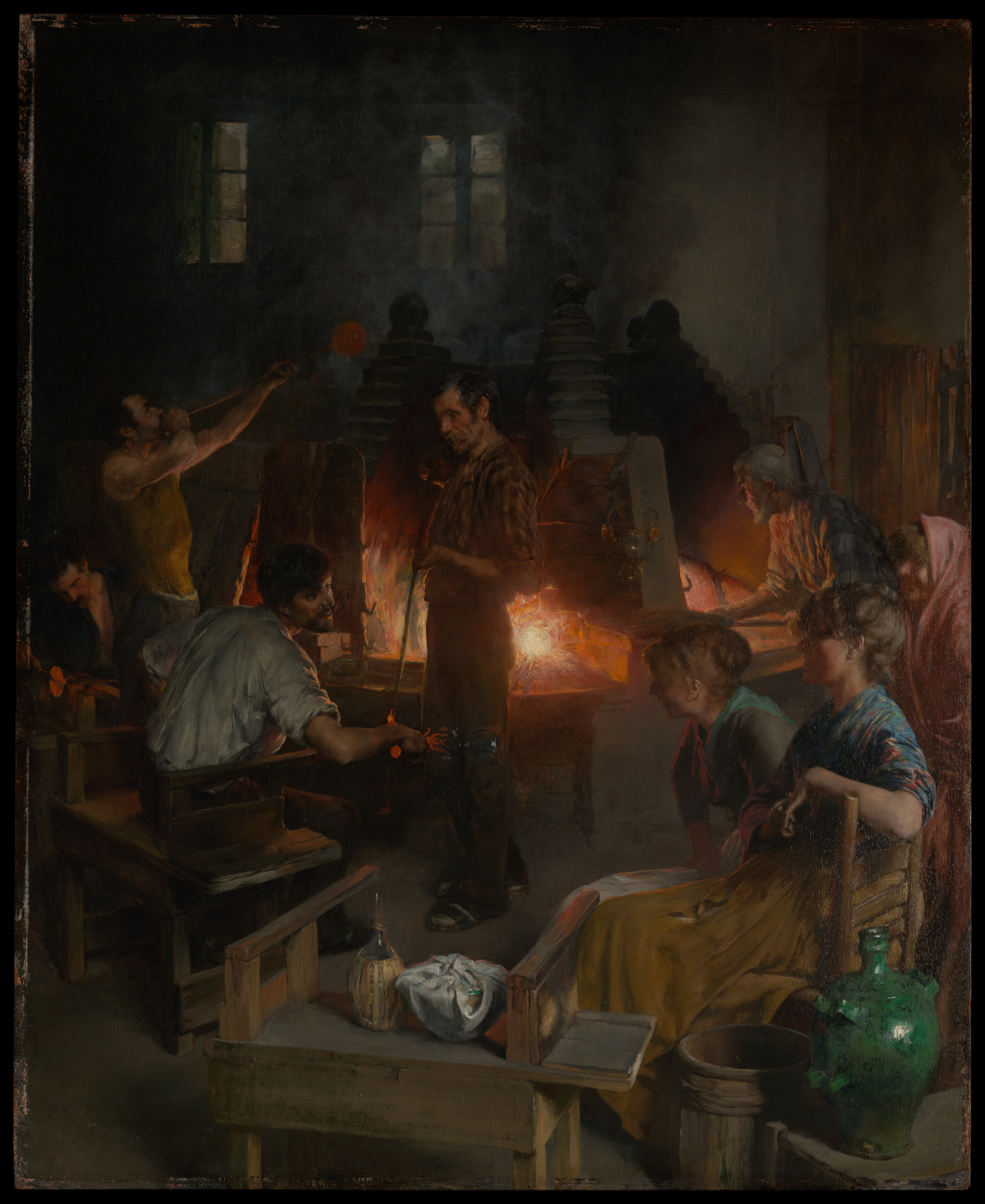
- Artist: Charles Frederic Ulrich
- Year: 1886
- Medium: Oil on wood
- Dimensions: 66.4 cm × 53.7 cm (26.1 in × 21.1 in)
- Location: Metropolitan Museum of Art; New York

Glass Blowers of Murano is a late 19th-century painting by American artist Charles Frederic Ulrich. Done in oil on wood, the work depicts a glassblowing foundry in Murano, Italy, which was famed for its glass. The painting is in the collection of the Metropolitan Museum of Art.
