= James William Wallack =

19th-century Anglo-American actor and manager

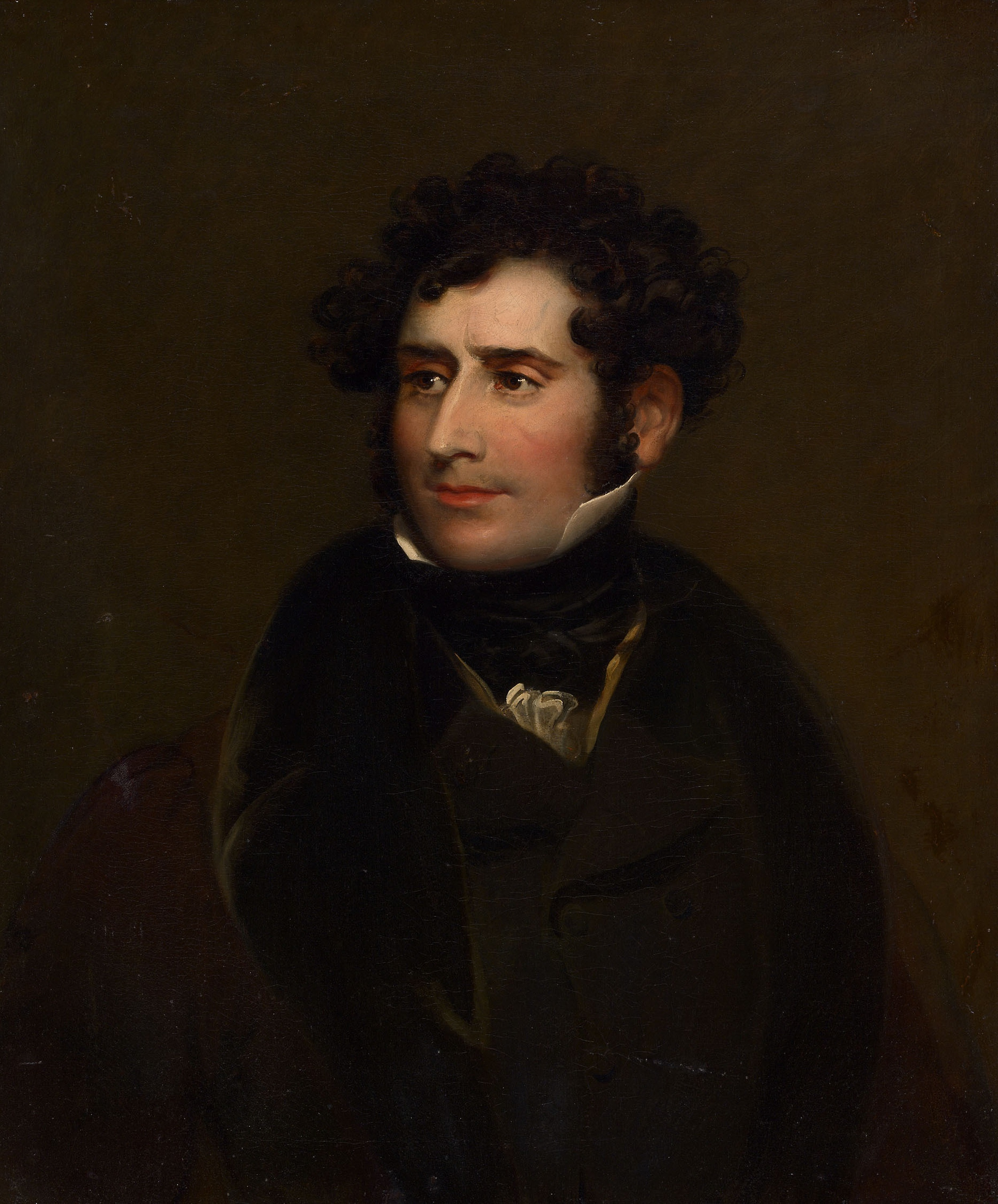
Portrait by Charles Robert Leslie, 1830s

James William Wallack (c. 1794–1864), commonly referred to as J. W. Wallack, was an Anglo-American actor and manager, born in London, and brother of Henry John Wallack.

== Life ==
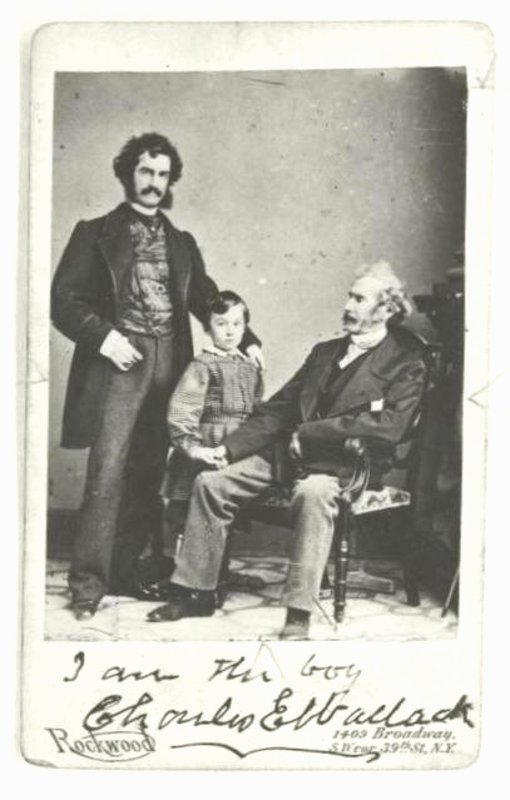
Lester Wallack (left) and James W. Wallack. The boy is Charles E. Wallack, Lester's son and James's grandson. Photo by Rockwood.

Wallack's father was named William Wallack and his sister was named Elizabeth. His parents were comedians, who performed at the London minor playhouses and in the British provinces. His first appearance on the stage was as a child at the Surrey Theatre in London. Soon afterward he performed in juvenile characters at Drury Lane, and at the age of eighteen entered on a permanent career at the same house as Laertes in Hamlet. He also acted in the British provinces and in Ireland, gradually winning his way to popularity as a useful representative of drama and comedy. In 1823 he played Victor Frankenstein in Presumption; or, the Fate of Frankenstein at the English Opera House. In 1824, Wallack became stage manager at Drury Lane, and rose to the performance of secondary roles in tragedy. Later he played at the Haymarket Theatre, and officiated as stage manager at the Princess's Theatre.

On the occasion of his first visit to the United States, in 1818, he played Macbeth at the Park Theatre, New York. He also played Romeo, Shylock, Coriolanus, Hamlet, and Richard III, all without making any favorable impression. But in the principal roles in The Stranger, Pizarro and The Gamester he closely copied the manner of Kemble and attracted favorable consideration. From 1818 until 1845 Wallack performed at intervals in all the principal cities of the United States. Among his roles were the chief characters in The Brigand, The Rent-Day, The Wonder, Don Cassar de Bazan, Wild Oats and the refined comedy parts of Mercutio, Jaques, and Benedick. Love's Ritornello, as sung by him in The Brigand, was hummed from one end of the country to the other.

In 1822 Wallack met with an accident, in which his leg was fractured by the overturning of a stagecoach between New York and Philadelphia. This mishap retired him from active life for about eighteen months, and from its effect he never entirely recovered. From 1837 until its destruction by fire, Wallack conducted the New York National Theatre. There he presented a repertory of the best plays in the English language, rendered by a company such as never before had been seen in this country.

He settled permanently in New York City in 1852. In that year, he assumed management of an 1850 theatre two doors south of Broome Street on the west side of Broadway, called Brougham's Lyceum, from John Brougham, renaming the theater Wallack's Lyceum. In 1861 he built a new Wallack's Theatre at 13th Street and Broadway. His son opened the third Wallack's Theatre in 1882.

Wallack was an actor of the old school. Thackeray praised his performance as Shylock, and Joseph Jefferson his Don Caesar de Bazan. As a performer he was endowed with a fine personality; his voice was highly melodious, set off by flexibility and careful elocution, and his knowledge of stage-effect was unexcelled. In refined and eccentric comedy Wallack had few superiors. Some of his roles in the romantic dramas of his own creation were entirely unequalled, and have died with him.

== Family ==
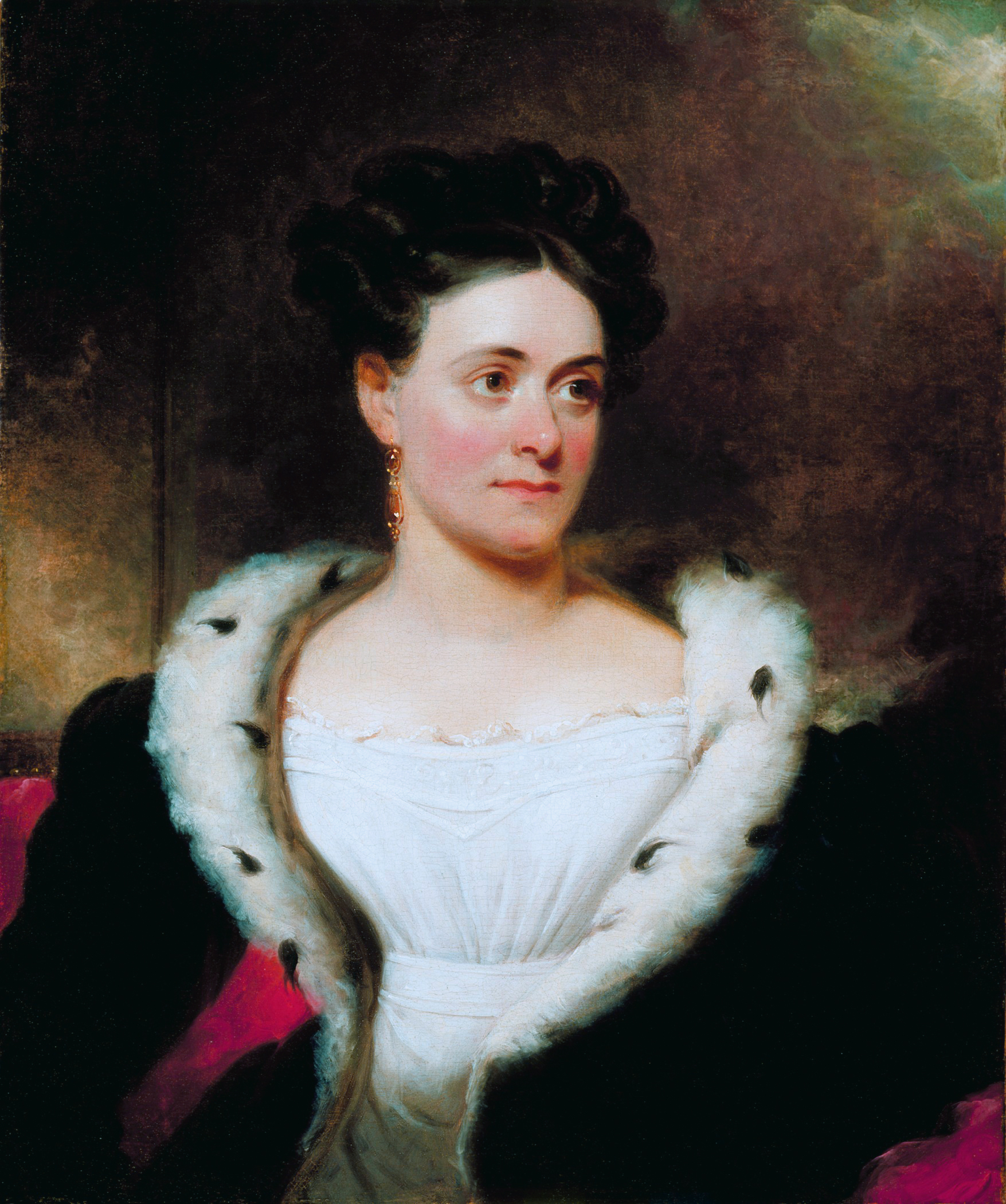
Mrs. James W. Wallack by Henry Inman, circa 1828

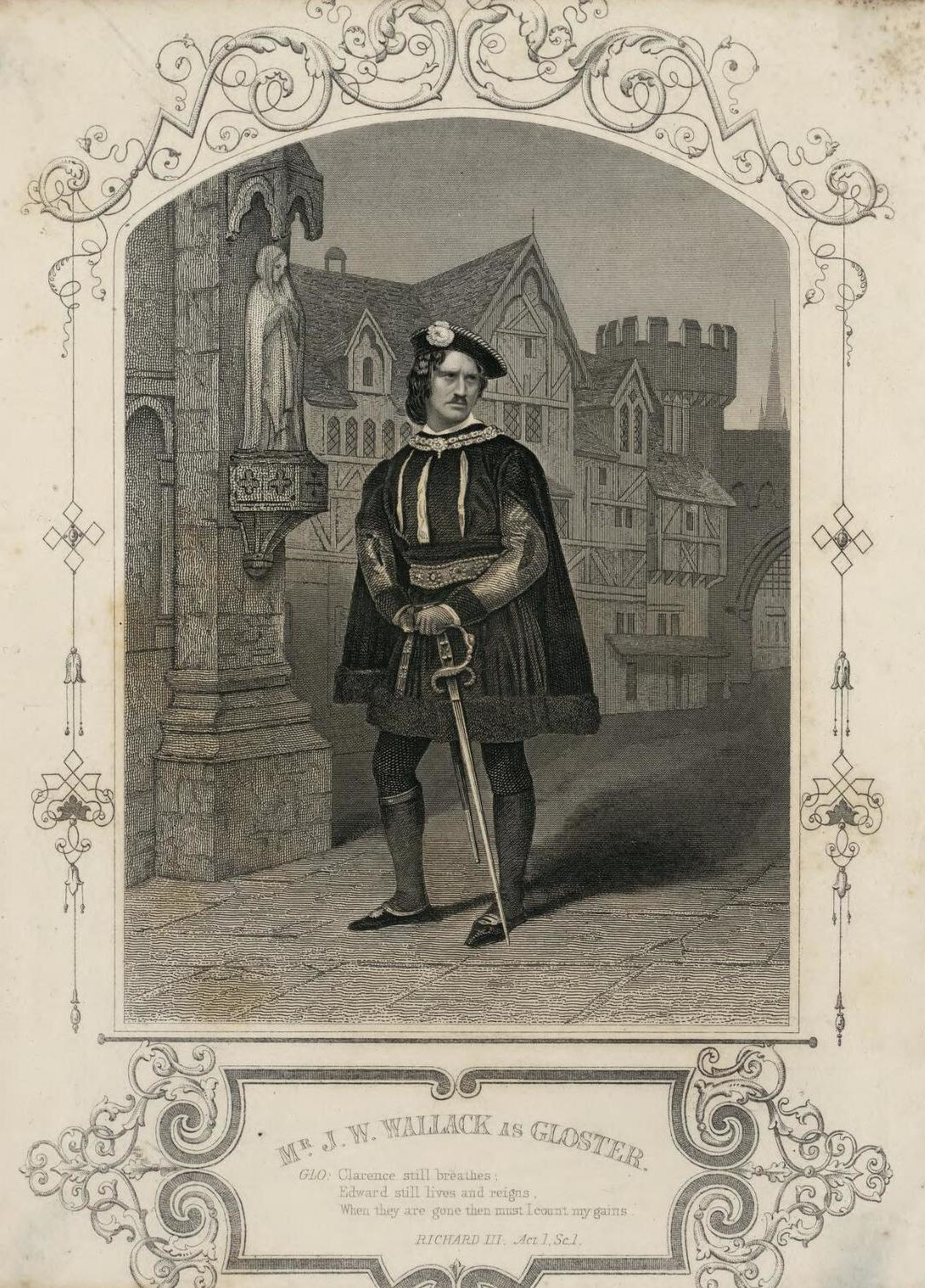
Poster of Wallack playing the part of 'Gloster', c.1850

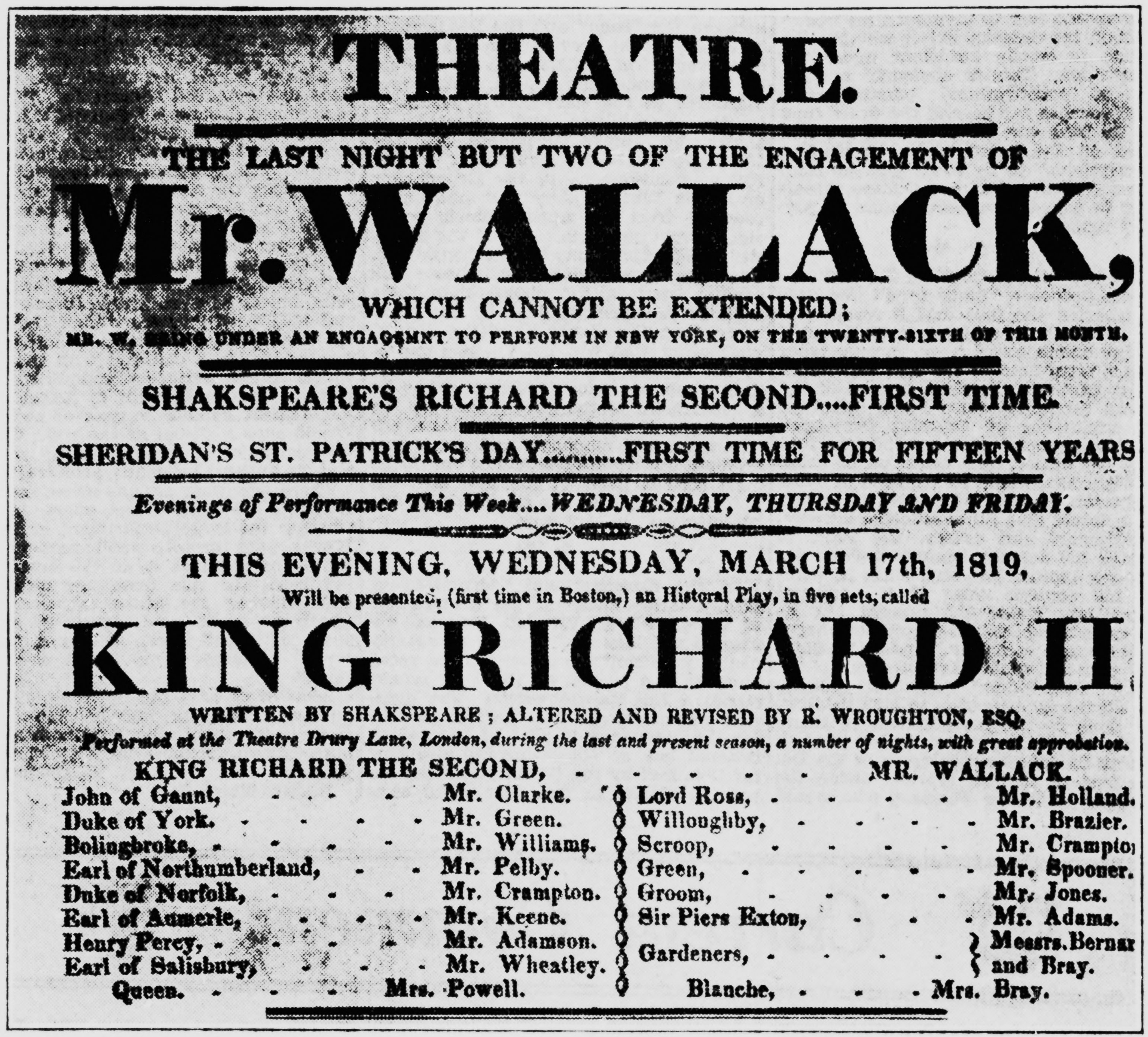
1819 playbill for the first performance in Boston, Massachusetts of the play King Richard II at the Federal Street Theater

Wallack married Susan Johnstone, a comic actress and the daughter of John Henry Johnstone, in 1817; she died in 1851. Together, the Wallacks had four sons. The eldest, Lester Wallack, was also a famous actor and theater manager. Wallack's sister, Elizabeth had a daughter, Leonora Pincott, who married Alfred Wigan was a noted actor.
