= Lester Wallack =

American actor (1820–1888)

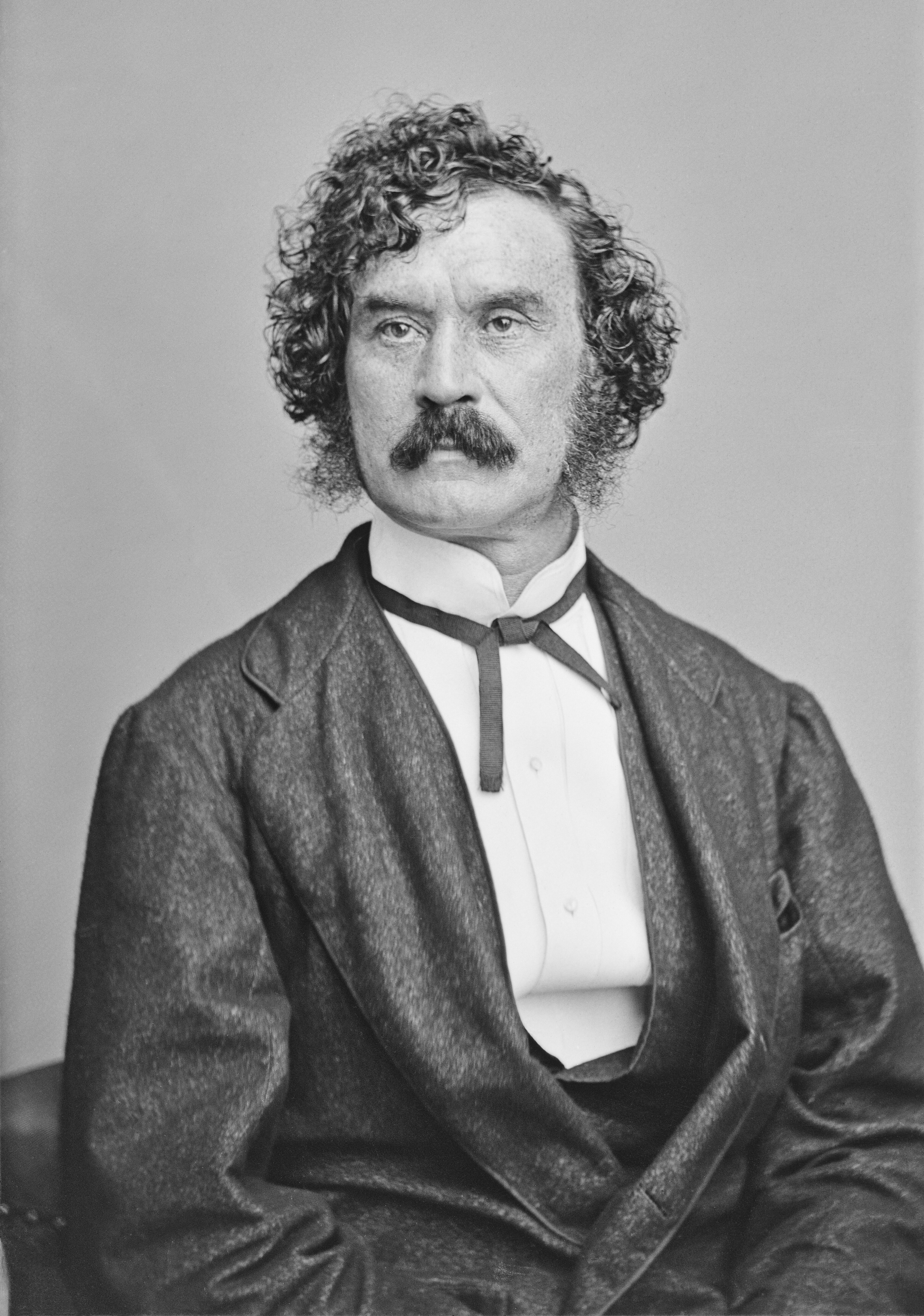
- J. Lester Wallack

Shepherd of The Lambs
- In office 1878-82 – 1884-88
- Preceded by: Henry James Montague
- Succeeded by: Harry Beckett

Personal details
- Born: John Johnstone Wallack; January 1, 1820 New York, New York
- Died: September 6, 1888 (aged 68) Stamford, Connecticut
- Resting place: Green-Wood Cemetery, Brooklyn, NY
- Spouse: Emily Mary Millais
- Occupation: Actor * Manager
- Known for: Co-Founder The Actors Fund
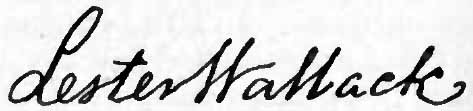
- Signature

John Johnstone Wallack (January 1, 1820, New York City – September 6, 1888, Stamford, Connecticut), was an American actor-manager and son of James William Wallack and Susan Johnstone. He used the stage name John Lester until October 5, 1858, when he first acted under the name Lester Wallack, which he retained the rest of his career.

== Biography ==
He was born in New York and relocated at an early age to his parents' home in London where he was reared and educated. His mother was actress Susan Johnstone and his father was James William Wallack, a theatre producer.

He chose a military career but became discouraged and went to Dublin where he began performing on stage. He remained for two seasons and then went to Edinburgh. Then, in 1846, he appeared in London at the Haymarket Theatre under Benjamin Webster's management. There he was seen by George H. Barrett, who had come to London to engage actors for the Broadway Theatre, in New York.

He made his American debut there in 1847, under the name of John Lester, appearing as Sir Charles Coldstream in Boucicault's adaptation of Used Up. His father's brother, Henry Wallack, the father of James William Wallack Jr. (1818–1873), was also in the Broadway Theatre's company. His second appearance was as Viscount de Ligny in Captain of the Guard by James Planché.

Subsequently, he performed at the Bowery Theatre, Burton's Theatre, Niblo's Garden and the first Wallack's Theatre. His first appearance at the Bowery Theatre was in 1849 as Don Caesar de Bazan by Adolphe d'Ennery and Philippe Dumanoir.

He managed the second Wallack's Theatre from 1861 (demolished in 1901), and in 1882 he opened the third at 30th Street and Broadway (demolished in 1915). Among the productions staged at the latter was Margaret Mather's ill-fated production of Cymbeline in 1897. Another Wallack's Theatre, at 254 West 42nd Street in New York, was named for him in 1924.

Wallack joined The Lambs in 1875, which frequently met at Wallack's Theater. He served as its Shepherd (president): 1878-82, 1884-88, and was one of the founders of the Actors' Fund of America.

His greatest successes were as Charles Surface, as Benedick, and especially as Elliot Grey in his own play Rosedale, and similar light comedy and romantic parts, for which his fascinating manners and handsome person well fitted him. He married a sister (d. 1909) of Sir John Millais. He wrote his own Memories of Fifty Years.
