= The Lambs =

Theatrical organization in New York City

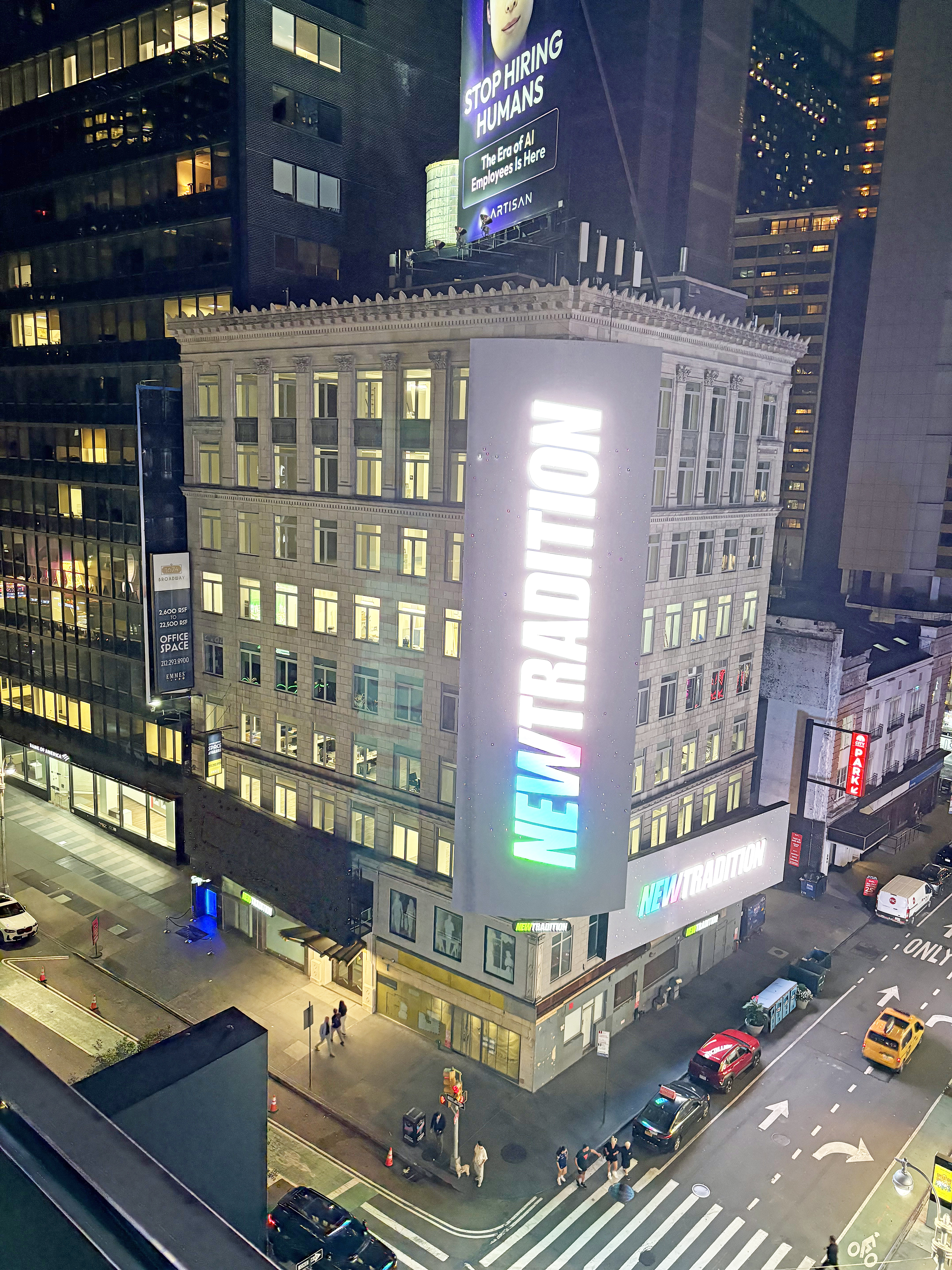
- The Lambs Clubhouse at 1674 Broadway
- Nickname: The Lambs Club
- Named after: Charles Lamb
- Formation: 1874; 152 years ago
- Founder: Henry James Montague
- Founded at: Delmonico's
- Purpose: Private Social Club for the Arts
- Location(s): 1674 Broadway; New York City
- Coordinates: 40°45′23″N 73°59′07″W
- Region served: United States
- Members: 250
- Shepherd: Kevin C. Fitzpatrick
- The Boy: Don M. Spiro
- Website: The-Lambs.org

The Lambs, Inc. (also known as The Lambs Club) is a New York City social club that nurtures those active in the arts, as well as those who are supporters of the arts, by providing activities and a clubhouse for its members. It is America's oldest professional theatrical organization.

The club's name honors the essayist Charles Lamb and his sister Mary, who during the early 19th century played host to actors and literati at their famed salon in London.

== History ==
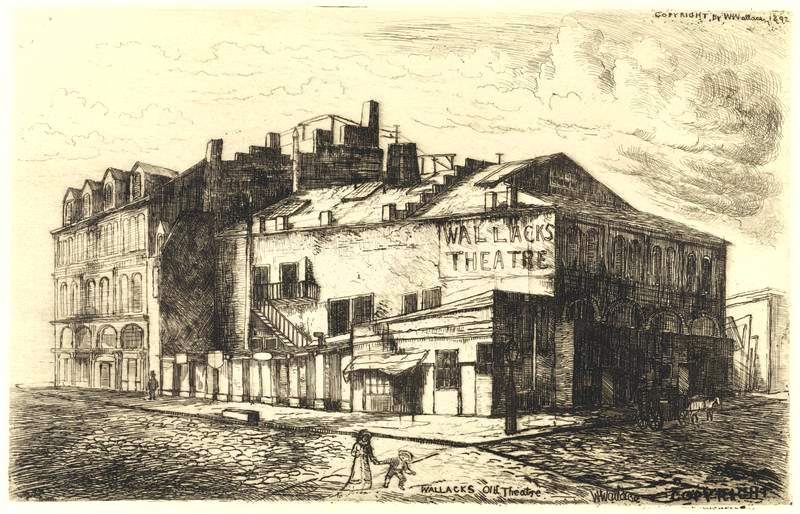
Wallack's Theatre, 13th Street, from Fourth Avenue

In 1874 New York theatrical life was centered around Union Square, Manhattan. Wallack's Theatre was on Broadway and 13th Street. During the Yuletide season George H. McLean invited actors of J. Lester Wallack's company to dinner at Delmonico's: Edward Arnott, Harry Beckett, Henry James Montague, and Arthur Wallack, the son of Mr. Wallack. They were joined by grocer John E. I. Grainger. In Delmonico's Blue Room it was suggested the men form a supper club. Many names were mentioned. Montague said that he was a member of The Lambs in London that had been established in 1869 by John Hare. The name was unanimously adopted; it came from Charles and Mary Lamb, the English brother and sister who were friendly towards actors in Georgian England.

In 1875 dinners were held in Union Square hotel restaurants; the original six invited their friends. By autumn 1875 the Lambs were meeting in the Union Square Hotel. The Members chose to increase by "sevens." There were so many applications the Club expanded. On May 10, 1877, the Club incorporated under the laws of the State of New York. There were 60 members.

On August 11, 1878, the Club suffered its first great loss, the death of Shepherd Henry J. Montague in San Francisco. Broadway impresario J. Lester Wallack–who would go on to serve seven terms as Shepherd–gave Montague a space in his family plot in Green-Wood Cemetery; the two rest next to each other today.

In April 1880 The Lambs moved to 34 West 26th Street, the first time under "a roof controlled by the Club." It would be the Clubhouse for 12 years. It was a period of "prosperity, joy, sorrow and calamity." In this era The Lambs entertained Gen. William Tecumseh Sherman, newspaper editor Charles A. Dana, and English actor Sir Henry Irving.

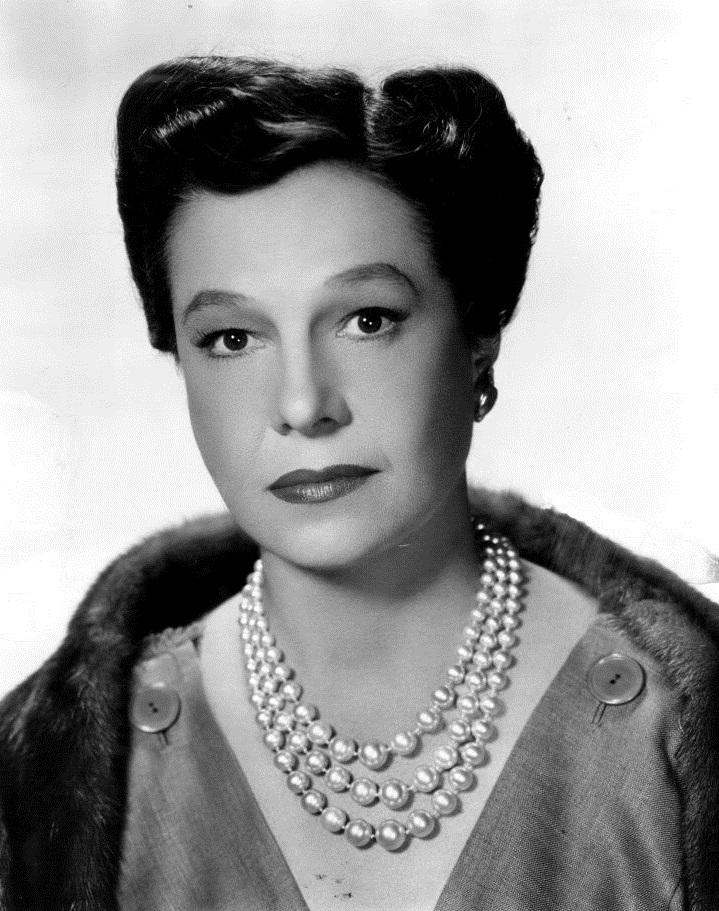
Cornelia Otis Skinner (1955), elected 1977

The Actors' Fund of America (today the Entertainment Community Fund) was formed by Lambs in 1882 at Wallack's Theatre and J. Lester Wallack was the first president. In 1887 it was Lambs with the Actors Fund who established the first Actors' Burial Ground in the Cemetery of the Evergreens in Brooklyn. Playwright Clay M. Greene suggested the Club put on its own shows, thus launching decades of Lambs' Gambols. Notable members of this era were Maurice Barrymore, Nikola Tesla, and Stanford White. In 1895 there were 272 members.

In 1905, as the theater industry moved uptown to Times Square, The Lambs moved to a larger facility at 128 West 44th Street. The building was expanded in 1915, to include a 300-seat theater and 66 modest sleeping quarters. It was used as the clubhouse until January 1975.

The Lambs thrived into the Jazz Age, ultimately reaching more than 1,700 members before the Wall Street crash of 1929. The club would move twelve times during its 150 years. In 1974 it ended gender discrimination and admitted women as full members; the first was Cornelia Otis Skinner, daughter of Lamb Otis Skinner.

The Lambs, Friars, and Players often are confused. In 1964, long-time syndicated columnist Earl Wilson put it this way: "Long ago a New Yorker asked the difference between the Lambs, Friars, and Players, since the membership was, at the time, predominantly from Broadway." It was left to "a wit believed to have been George S. Kaufman" to draw the distinction: "The Players are gentlemen trying to be actors, the Lambs are actors trying to be gentlemen, and the Friars are neither trying to be both."

== Milestones ==
Lambs Club 1927 Sketch Cast Reginald Barlow Alf Helton Harry Beresford Junior Durkin Walter Catlett John Cherry DeWolf Hopper Edgar Nelson Frank McHugh Loren Raker Barry McCollum

The Actors' strike of 1919 was settled in The Lambs, which was referred to as "Local One." In 1924, it celebrated its 50-year anniversary at the Earl Carroll Theatre.

Historically, The Lambs has been the spawning ground of plays, friendships and partnerships. Mark Twain Tonight (with Hal Holbrook) and Stalag 17 were first performed at The Lambs before their national successes.

Alan J. Lerner and Frederick Loewe first met at The Lambs, often trying works-in-progress on their fellow Lambs. Loewe left a percentage of his share of Brigadoon royalties to The Lambs' Foundation.

Its members have been instrumental in the formation of ASCAP, Actors' Equity and The Actors' Fund of America, Screen Actors Guild (SAG) and in the merger that created SAG-AFTRA. Of the first 21 council members of Actors' Equity, 20 were members of The Lambs. The meetings to form Actors' Equity were held at The Players, a club similar to The Lambs, because there were too many producer members of The Lambs.

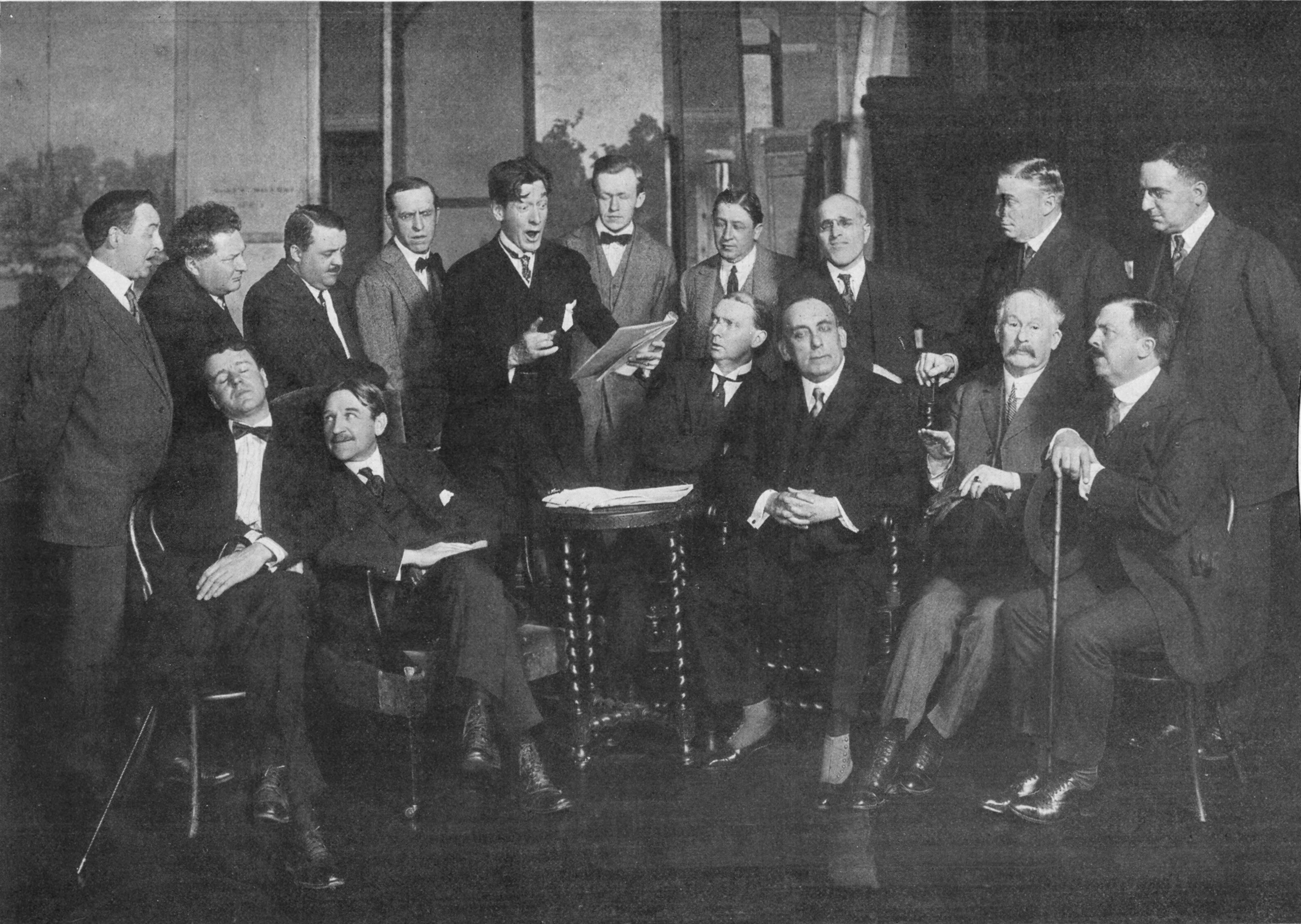
Songwriters and playwrights work on the 1915 Lambs Gambol. Standing: Mark Swan, Edgar Smith, Porter Emerson Browne, Edwin Ellis, Joseph Herbert, Avery Hopwood, Edward Peple, Edward Paulton, Augustus Thomas, Montague Glass; Sitting: Brandon Tynan, Milton Royle, Glen McDonough, George V. Hobart, Edward Kidder, and Rupert Hughes.

== Notable Lambs ==
Since its founding, there have been more than 6,700 Lambs, including: Fred Astaire, Irving Berlin, Henry Blossom, Sid Caesar, James Cagney, Eddie Cantor, George M. Cohan, Cecil B. DeMille, W.C. Fields, Albert Hague, Mark Hart, Silvio Hein, Ken Howard, Al Jolson, John F. Madden, Conrad Nagel, Eugene O'Neill, Donald Pippin, Joyce Randolph, Cliff Robertson, Edward G. Robinson, Will Rogers, John Philip Sousa, Spencer Tracy, Abe Vigoda, Fred Waring, and Jack Whiting.

Current honorary members include Matthew Broderick, Stephen Schwartz and Jim Dale. The Lambs' website contains a listing of its past and current members.

== Shepherd ==
The president of The Lambs is called "The Shepherd". Originally, the term was one year, later extended to two years. As of 2014 the term is three years. The Club owns portraits and busts of every shepherd, painted by artists such as Howard Chandler Christy, James Montgomery Flagg, Everett Raymond Kinstler, and Michael Shane Neal.

No	Name	Term(s)
1	Henry James Montague	1874–1878
2	J. Lester Wallack	1878–82, 1884–88
3	Harry Beckett	1879–1880
4	William J. Florence	1882–1884
5	John R. Brady	1888–1890
6	Edmund M. Holland	1890–1891
7	Clay M. Greene	1891–98, 1902–06
8	Thomas B. Clarke	1898–1900
9	DeWolf Hopper	1900–1902
10	Wilton Lackaye	1906–1907
11	Augustus Thomas	1907–1910
12	Joseph R. Grismer	1911–13, 1917–18
13	William Courtleigh, Sr.	1913–1917
14	R. H. Burnside	1918–1921
15	A. O. Brown	1921–24, 1930–32
16	Thomas Meighan	1924–1926
17	Thomas A. Wise	1926–1928
18	Fritz Williams	1928–1930
19	Frank Crumit	1932–1936
20	William Gaxton	1936–39, 1953–54, 1956–61
21	Fred Waring	1939–1942
22	John Golden	1942–1945
23	Raymond Wilson Peck	1945–1947
25	Bert Lytell	1947–1952
25	Walter Greaza	1953–1956
26	Frank M. Thomas	1961–1963
27	Martin Begley	1963–1966
28	Harry Hershfield	1966–1969
29	Jack Waldron	1969
30	Tom Dillon	1969–1986
31	Richard L. Charles	1986–1997
32	A.J. Pocock	1998–2001
33	Bruce Brown	2002–2008
34	Randy Phillips	2008–2013
35	Marc Baron	2013–2022
36	Kevin C. Fitzpatrick	2023–Present

== Clubhouses ==
The Lambs has had many Manhattan homes since 1874, beginning with Delmonico's Restaurant in Union Square. The members met at various hotels and restaurants until it was established enough to buy property in 1879. The Lambs then either owned or leased space until 1976, when it relocated to 3 West 51st Street. The club moved to 1674 Broadway in 2025.

No	Date	Place	Notes
1	1874	Delmonico's Blue Room Union Square	14th St and Fifth Ave.
2	1875	Maison Dorée (Morton House)	14th Street and Broadway
3	1875	Union Square Hotel	15th St and Fourth Ave.
4	1876	848 Broadway	The Matchbox
5	1878	6 Union Square	Monument House
6	1879	19 East 16th Street	Brownstone
7	1880	34 West 26th Street	Brownstone
8	1892	1200 Broadway and 29th Street	Gilsey House
9	1893	26 West 31st Street	Brownstone
10	1897	70 West 36th Street	Keens Chop House
11	1905	128 West 44th Street	Enlarged 1915
12	1975	5 East 66th Street	Lotos Club guests
13	1976	3 West 51st Street	3 West Club
14	2025	1674 Broadway	Earle Building

=== 128–130 West 44th Street ===
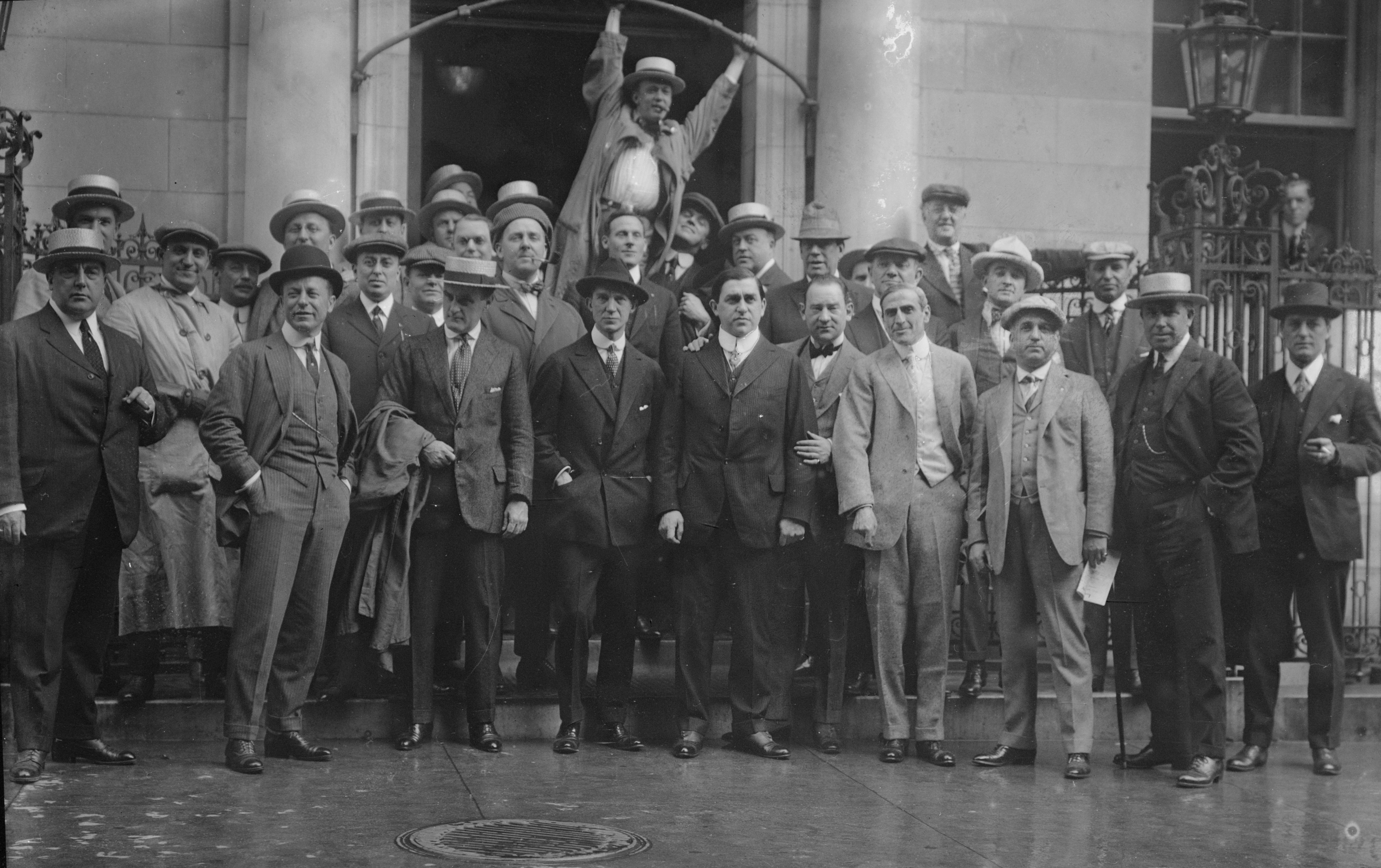
The Lambs on June 27, 1915 at 130 West 44th Street

In 1905, the club moved to 128–130 West 44th Street, designed by Lamb Stanford White and doubled in size in 1915. The club remained at 44th Street until 1975, when it lost the building to foreclosure. It was purchased from a bank by the Church of the Nazarene, which leased part of the building for what would become the Off Broadway Lamb's Theatre. The building was designated a New York City Landmark in September 1974 and was added to the National Register of Historic Places on June 3, 1982. The church sold the building in 2006 to Hampshire Hotels, which renovated the building into the Chatwal New York hotel. The Chatwal Hotel contains the Lambs Club restaurant although there is no relation between the hotel and The Lambs.

== Current activity ==
In 2025 the club moved to 1674 Broadway, on the corner of West 52nd Street, the Earle Building.

The club is organized under 501(c)(7) Social and Recreation Clubs with a ruling year of 2014. In 2024, it claimed total revenue of $190,096 and total assets of $263,223. There were total expenses of $247,577.

The Lambs has elected more than 6,700 members over the decades, counting actors and theater owners, playwrights and painters, singers and sculptors, and today's podcasters and comedy writers. Over the decades it was at The Lambs that hit shows and songs were launched, partnerships and friendships formed, and bonds of fellowship made.

The Lambs is also a historical society, preserving and promoting entertainment history stretching back to the 19th century. The club's art collection of oil paintings, theatrical memorabilia, and playbills, together with a private research library, is a museum of American entertainment history. The Lambs are currently digitizing its collection to make it available to the public. Starting in 1974, the Lambs has donated thousands of important historic documents to the New York Public Library for the Performing Arts.

As the club prepared to celebrate its sesquicentennial in 2024, it undertook a program to grow its membership. In 2023 author Kevin C. Fitzpatrick was elected the 36th Shepherd of The Lambs, and producer Don M. Spiro elected The Boy (vice president). The Lambs celebrated its 150th anniversary in 2024 by reaching 250 members, the most since the 1960s.

== Gallery ==
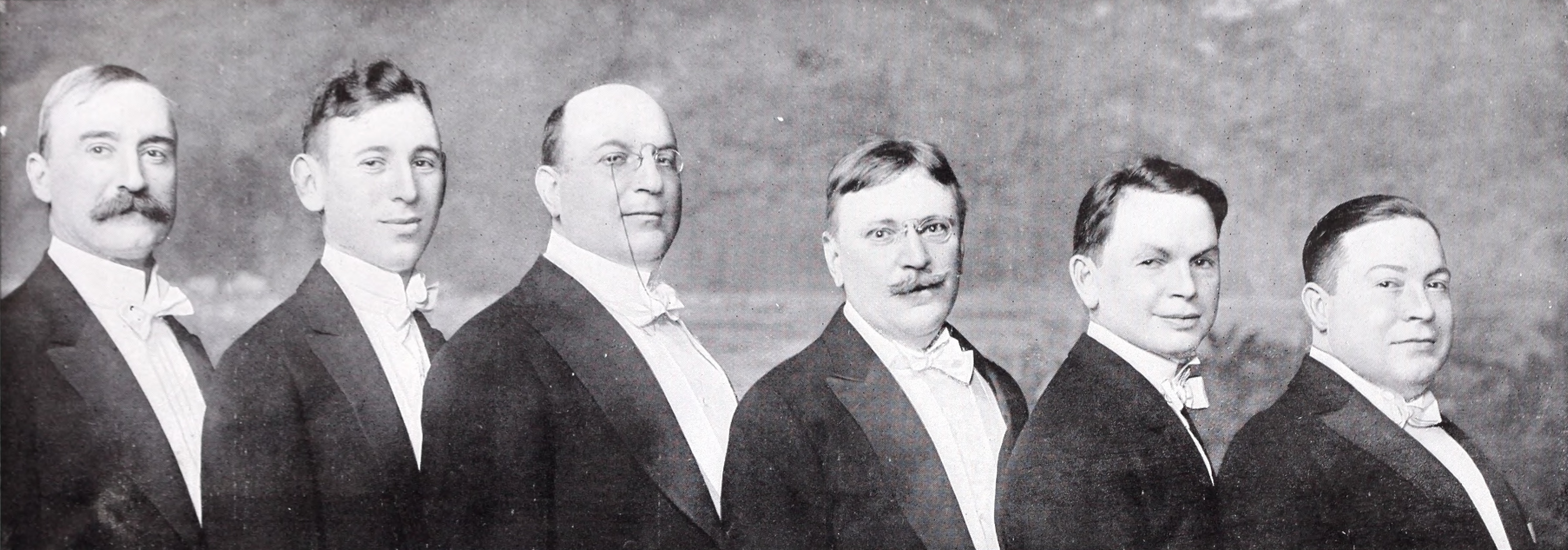
Cartoonist members of The Lambs in 1915. From left: Thomas E. Powers, Rube Goldberg, Henry Mayer, Richard Outcault, Clare Briggs, George McManus.

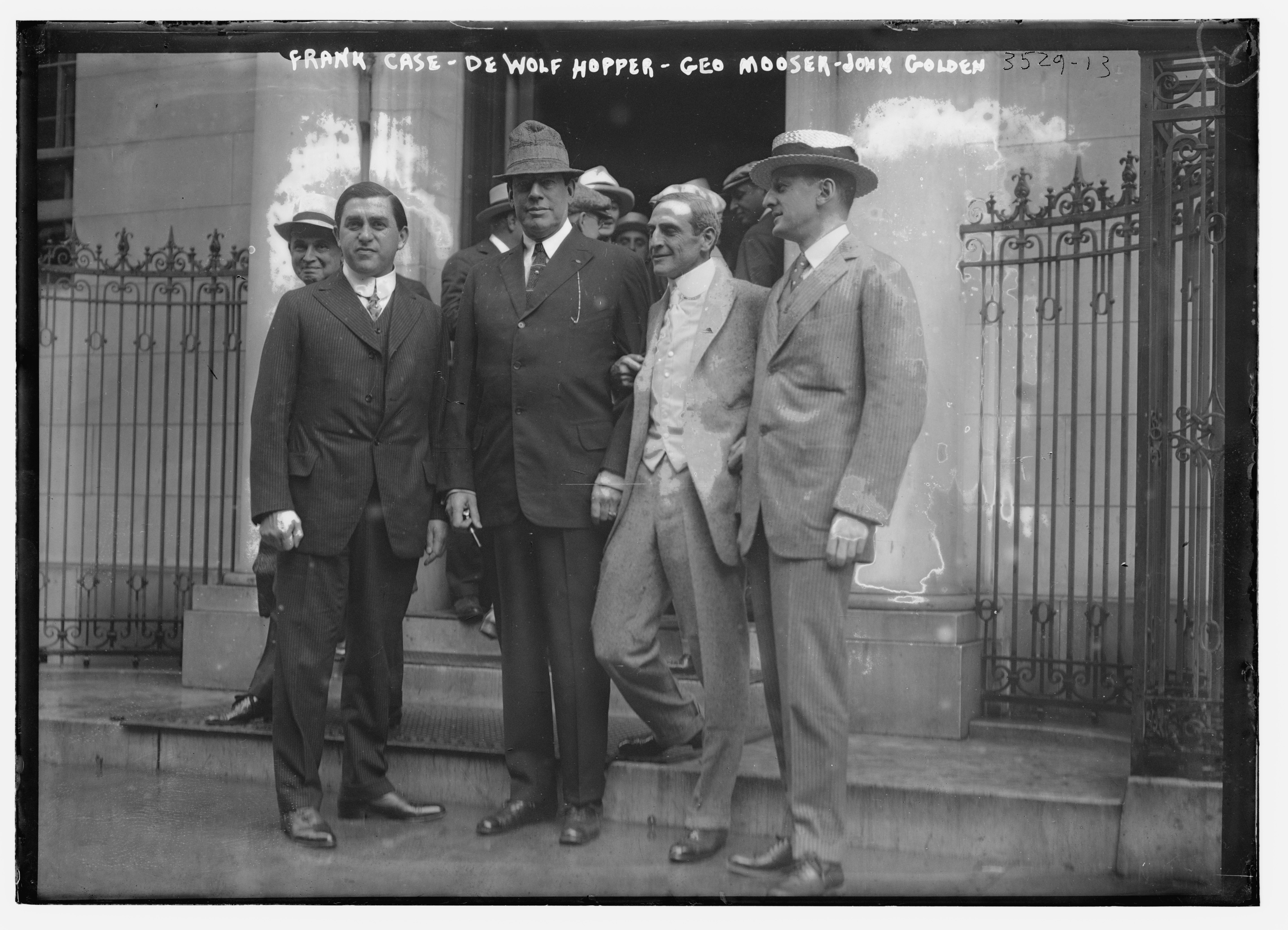
Lambs members in 1910. From left: Comedian DeWolf Hopper, producer and theatrical director George Mooser, producer John Golden, and Frank Case, manager of the Algonquin Hotel.

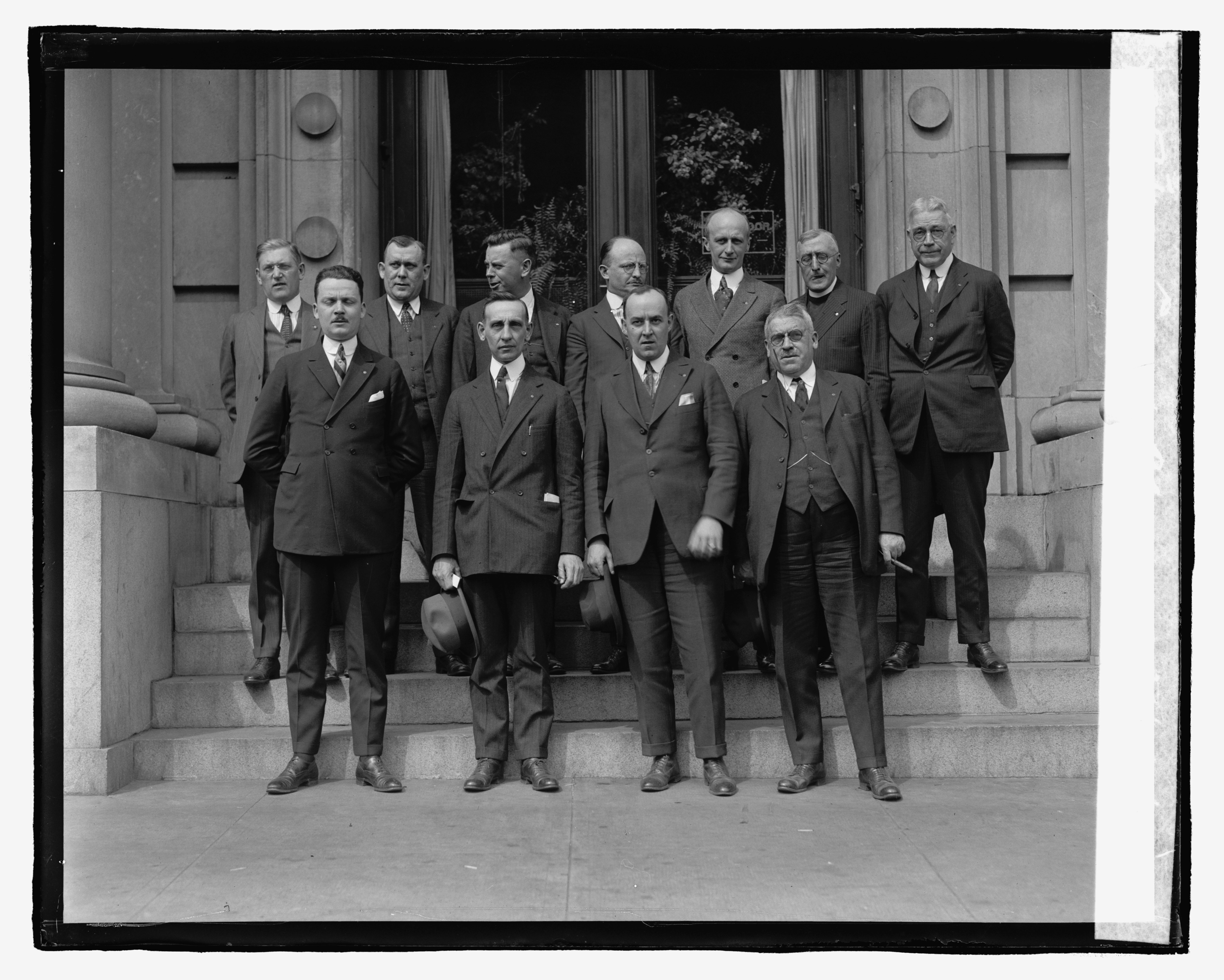
Lambs members in 1923

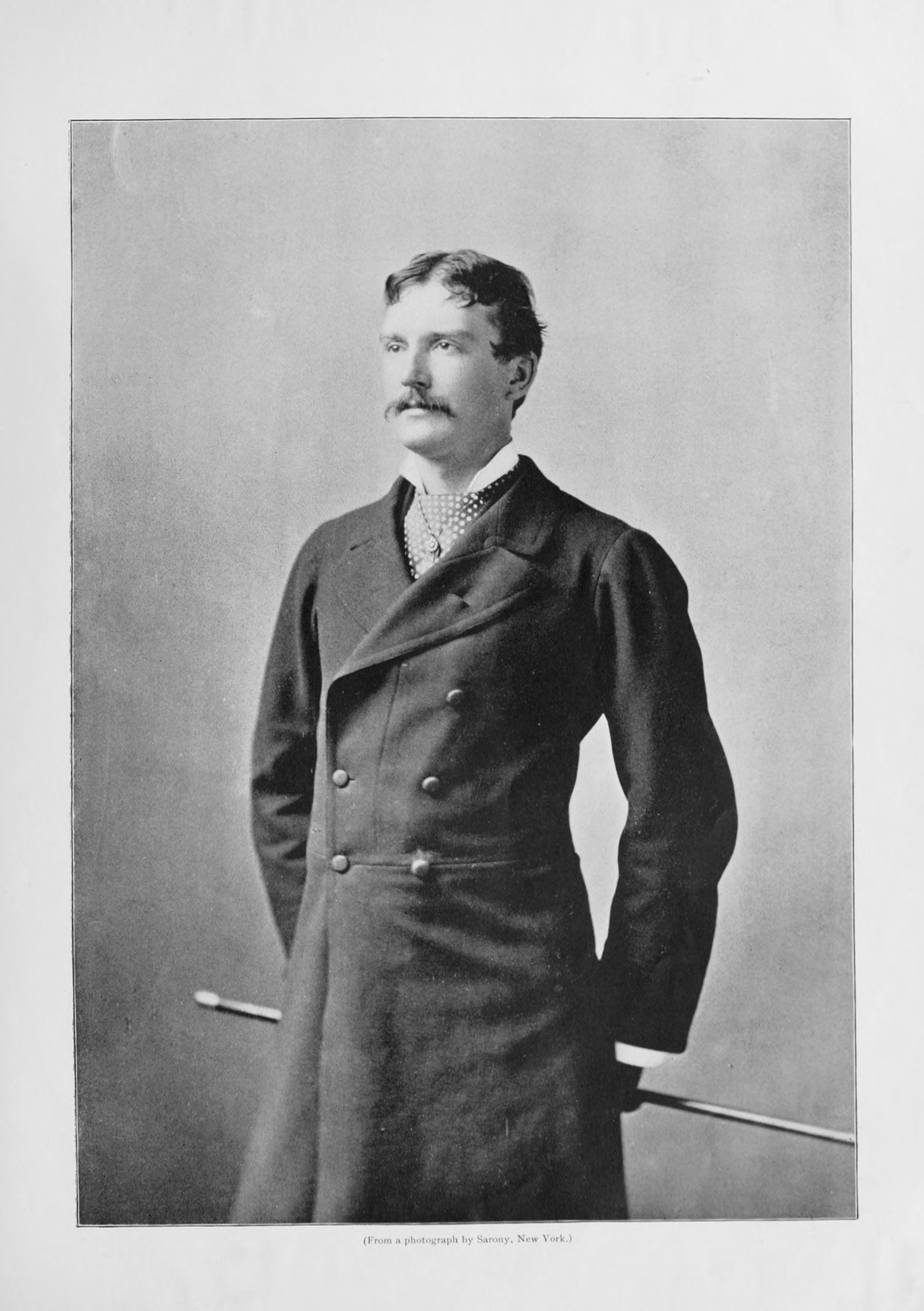
Henry James Montague, Shepherd of The Lambs, 1874–1878

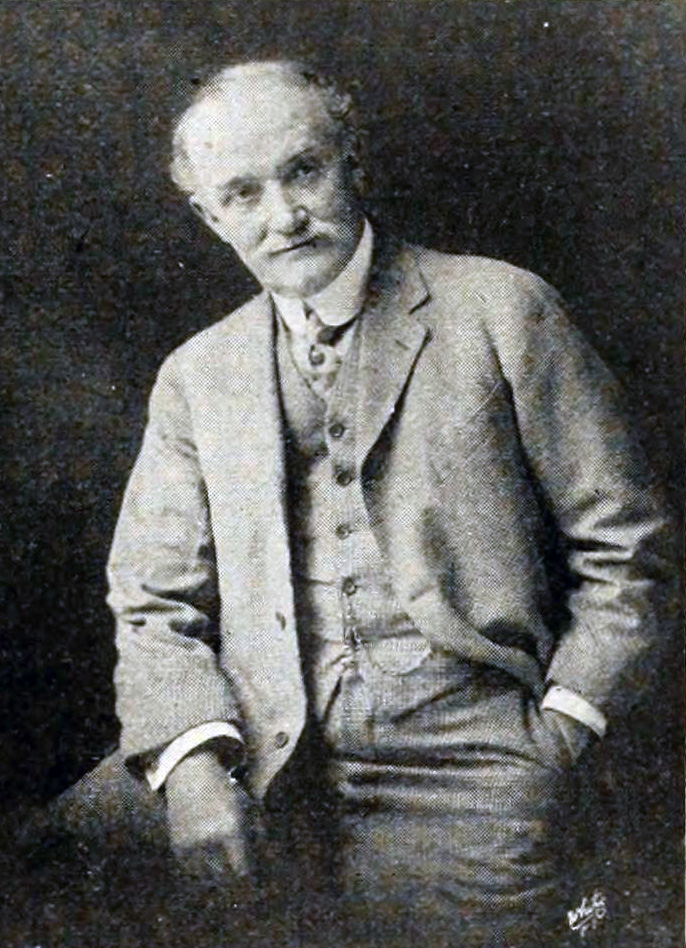
Clay M. Greene, Shepherd of The Lambs, 1891-98 – 1902-06

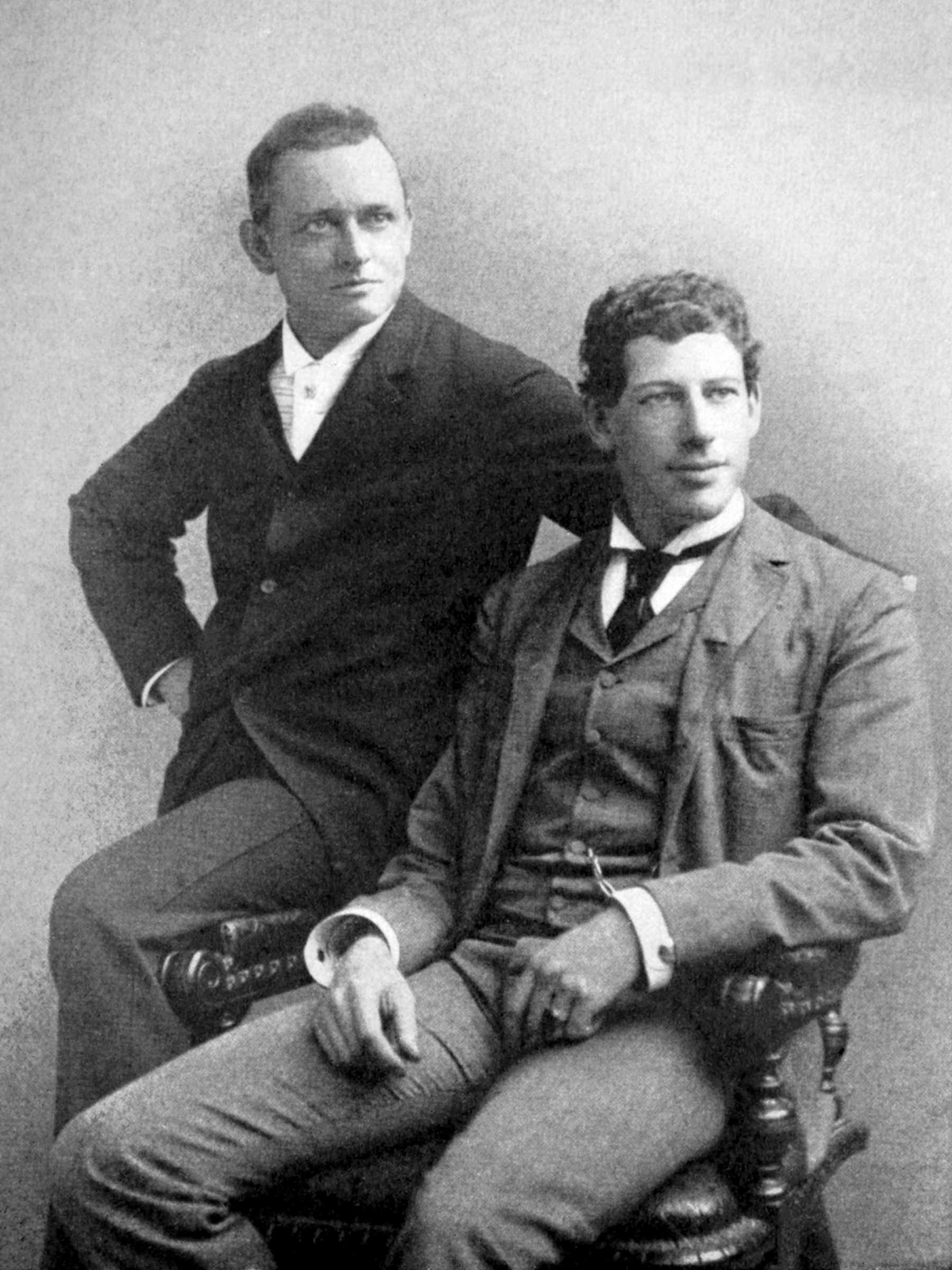
Digby Bell and DeWolf Hopper, leaders of The Lambs

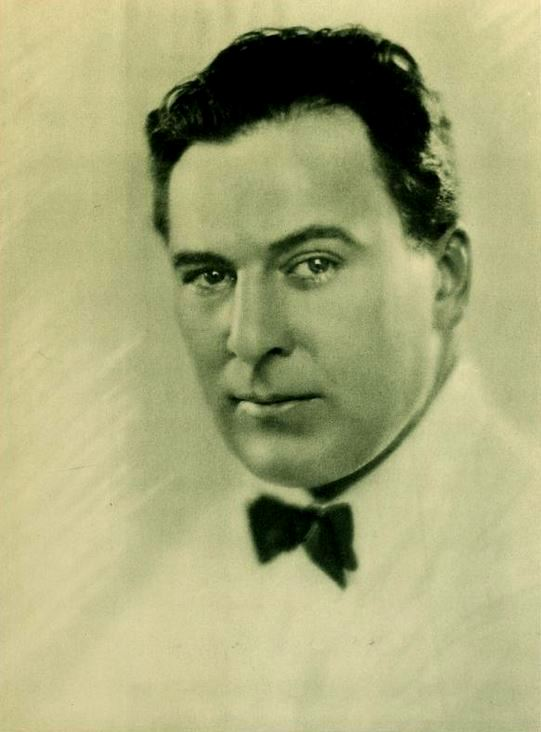
Thomas Meighan (1922), first movie star Lambs' shepherd

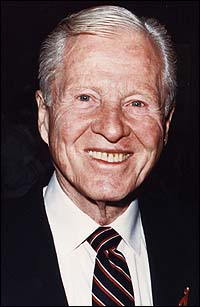
Tom Dillon, Shepherd of The Lambs, 1969–1986
