= Harry Beckett (actor) =

British-American actor (1839–1880)

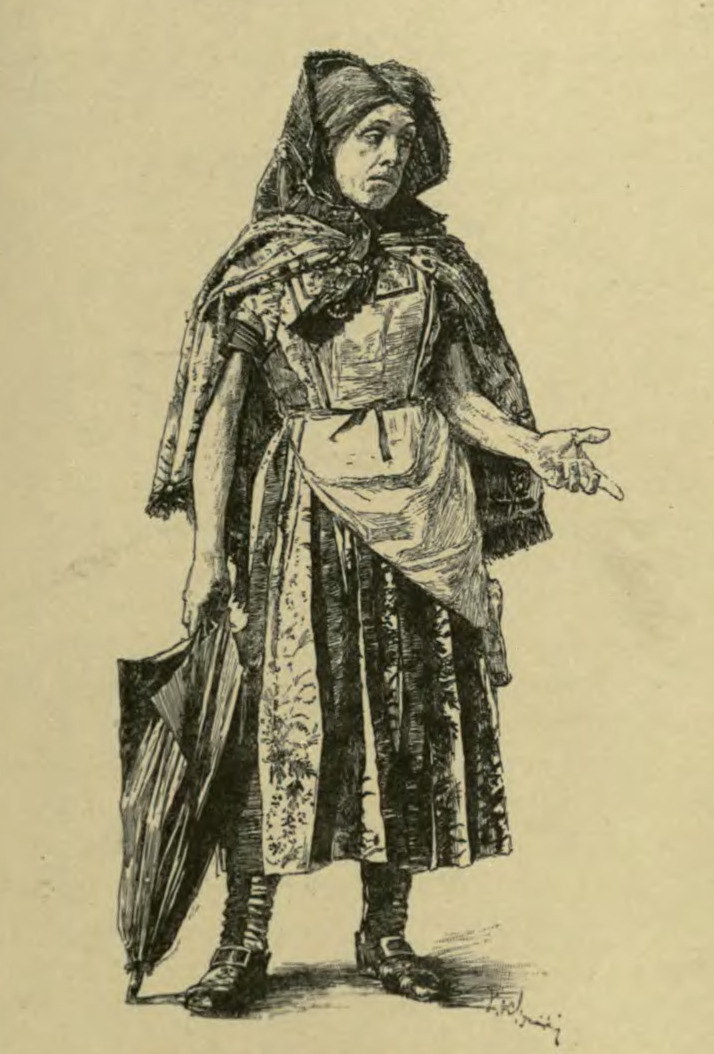
- Beckett as the Widow Twankey in Aladdin

Shepherd of The Lambs
- In office 1879–1880
- Preceded by: Lester Wallack
- Succeeded by: Lester Wallack

Personal details
- Born: Harry Beckett; June 10, 1839 London, England
- Died: October 24, 1880 (aged 41) London, England
- Resting place: Brompton Cemetery, London
- Occupation: Actor

Harry Beckett (10 June 1839 – 24 October 1880) was a comedian who was president of The Lambs from 1879 to 1880.

== Biography ==
He was born on 10 June 1839 in London. His father died at an early age, and he was raised by his mother. He was trained as a violinist. He was president of The Lambs from 1879 to 1880. He died on 24 October 1880.
