= Thomas B. Clarke =

Art dealer and patron (1848–1931)

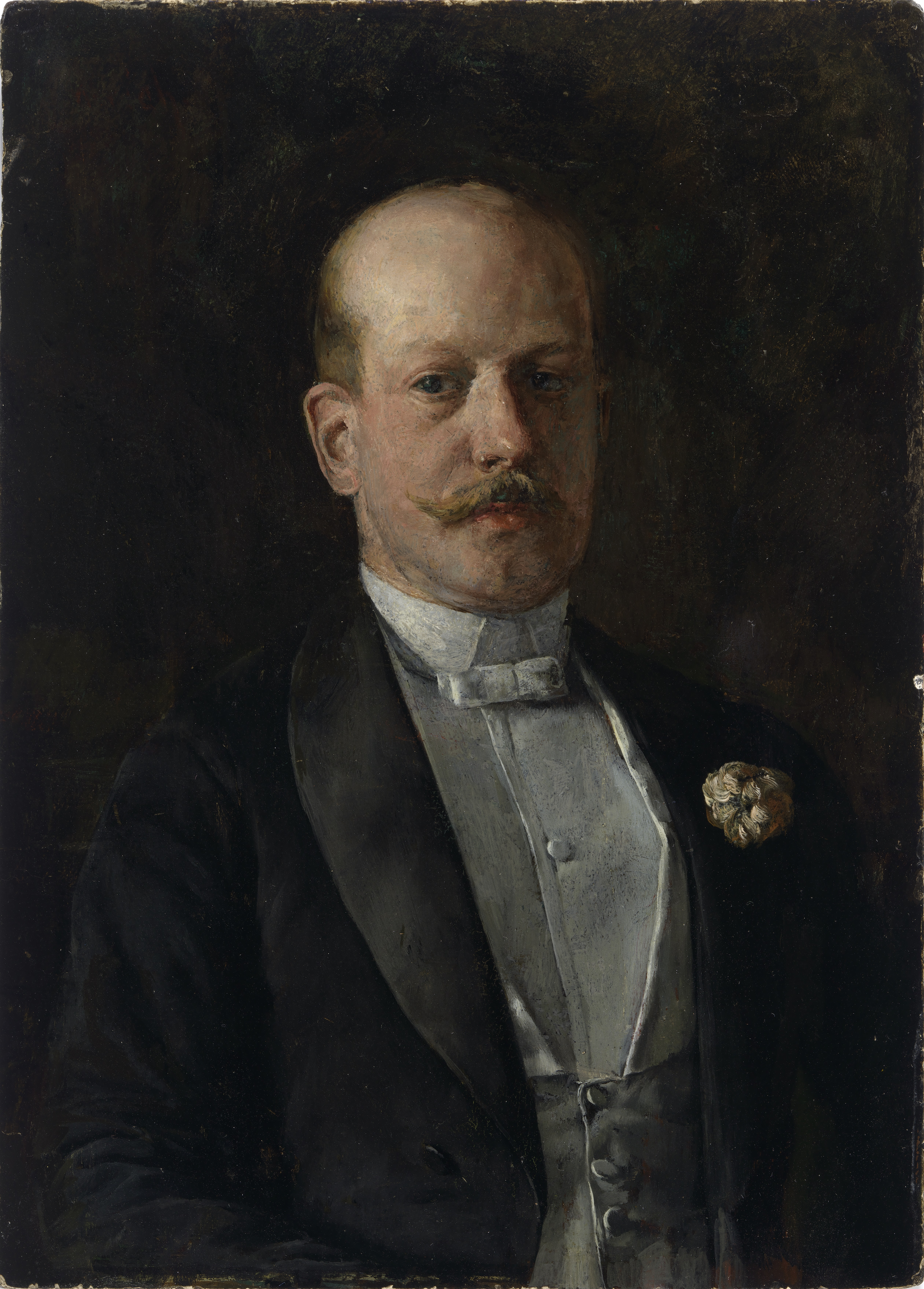
- Thomas Benedict Clarke by Charles Frederic Ulrich (1884)

Shepherd of The Lambs
- In office 1898–1900
- Preceded by: Clay M. Greene
- Succeeded by: DeWolf Hopper

Personal details
- Born: Thomas Benedict Clarke; December 11, 1848 New York City, New York, U.S.
- Died: January 18, 1931 (aged 82)
- Resting place: Green-Wood Cemetery, Brooklyn, NY
- Spouse: Fannie Eugenia Morris
- Parent: George Washington Clarke (father)
- Occupation: Art Collector

Thomas Benedict Clarke (December 11, 1848 – January 18, 1931) was an art collector from New York City.

== Biography ==
He was born December 11, 1848, in New York City as the son of Dr. George Washington Clarke (1816–1908), headmaster of the Mount Washington Collegiate Institute of New York. He finished his education at his father's institution and started off as a businessman in linen and lace manufacturing, but also became a patron of American contemporary art. He married Fannie Eugenia Morris in 1871 and became a patron of leading artists of the Hudson River School in the 1870s, including George Inness and Albert Bierstadt. In 1883, his collection was shown as one of the first exhibitions at the American Art Association.

He also began collecting porcelain, and donated some to the Union League Club of New York while he was chairman of the art committee there. He retired from the linen business in 1888 to become a full-time art dealer and was an art advisor and agent for J. P. Morgan.

Clarke was elected 8th Shepherd (president) of The Lambs in 1898. The closest connection he had with the theater was through his son, who was briefly married to actress Elsie Ferguson. Clarke was elected to the club in 1888 as a non-theatrical member; he joined the council almost immediately. He was corresponding secretary 1889-98, and served as shepherd for two one-year terms, 1898-1900.

Clarke bought the premises of the Suffolk Hunt Club in East Hampton, Long Island in 1917 as a summer home, while transforming his new residence in New York into an art gallery, today the home of the Collectors Club of New York. His daughter Grace, who married the equestrian painter Richard Newton Jr., had been a member there until her death in 1915, and Clarke published her books with illustrations by her husband in 1917. He renamed his Long Island residence "Lindenland".
