= Raymond Wilson Peck =

American lyricist and composer (1874–1950)

Raymond W. Peck
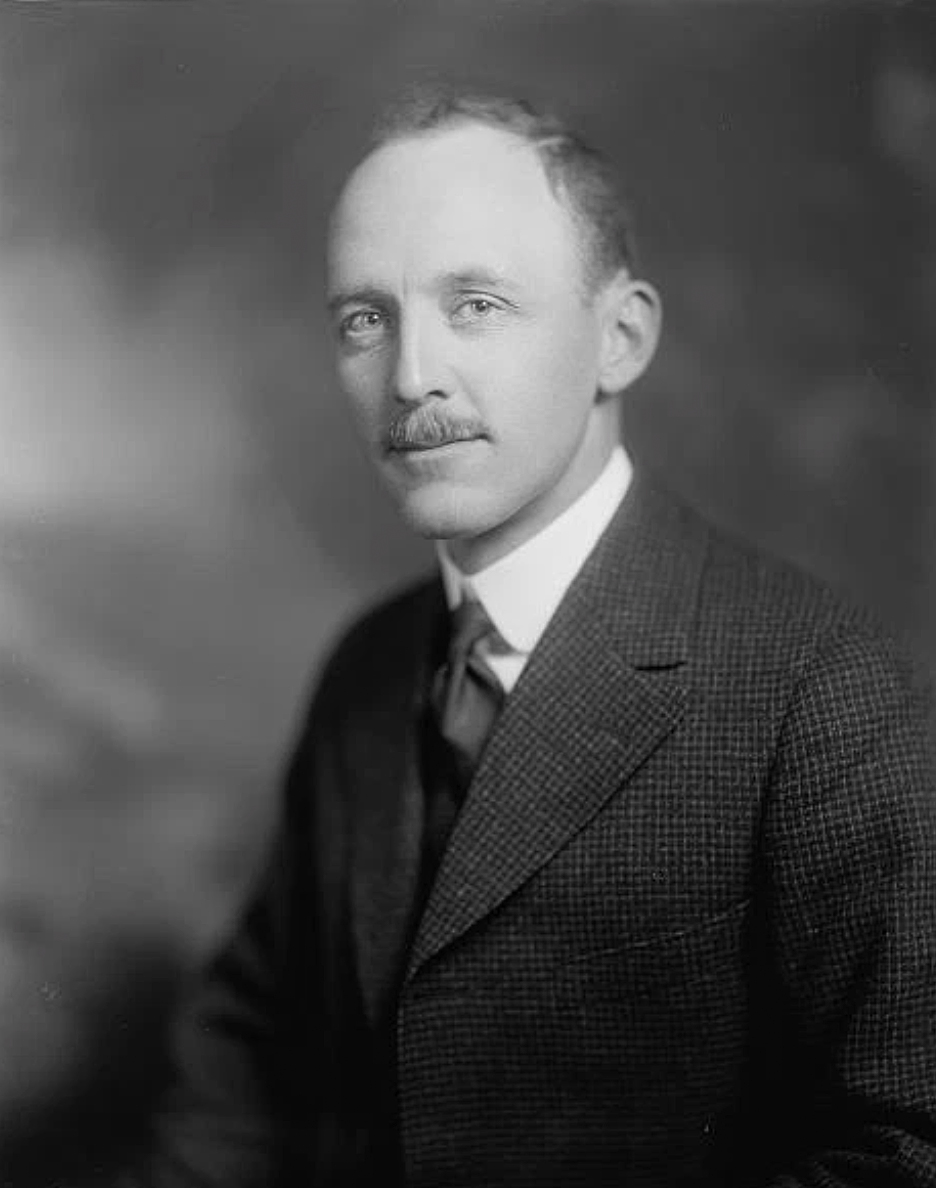
- Ray Peck, circa 1918

Shepherd of The Lambs
- In office 1945–1947
- Preceded by: John Golden
- Succeeded by: Bert Lytell

Personal details
- Born: Raymond Wilson Peck; July 3, 1874 Jackson, Mississippi
- Died: March 16, 1950 (aged 75) East Islip, New York
- Resting place: Kensico Cemetery, Valhalla, NY
- Occupation: Lyricist, Composer
- Known for: Castles in the Air

Raymond Wilson Peck (July 3, 1874 - March 16, 1950) was an American writer, lyricist, and composer. He was the Shepherd (president) of The Lambs from 1945 to 1947.

== Biography ==
He was born in Jackson, Mississippi on July 3, 1874. Peck worked as a newspaper writer and editor before moving to New York City.

He joined The Lambs in 1910 and served on the house committee, as the librarian, and as the recording secretary. He replaced John L. Golden as president of The Lambs in 1945.

Peck managed the Percy Williams Home for Retired Actors and Actresses in East Islip, New York; he was also a resident.

He died at the Percy Williams Home on March 16, 1950.

== Broadway productions ==
- Castles in the Air (1926) book and lyrics
- The Right Girl (1921) book and lyrics
- The Rose Maid (1912) book
- Ziegfeld Follies of 1911 additional music
- A Certain Party (1911) featuring songs with lyrics by Raymond Peck
- The Hoyden (1907) songs with lyrics
- The Vanderbilt Cup (play) (1907) lyrics
