= Susan Johnstone =

American actress

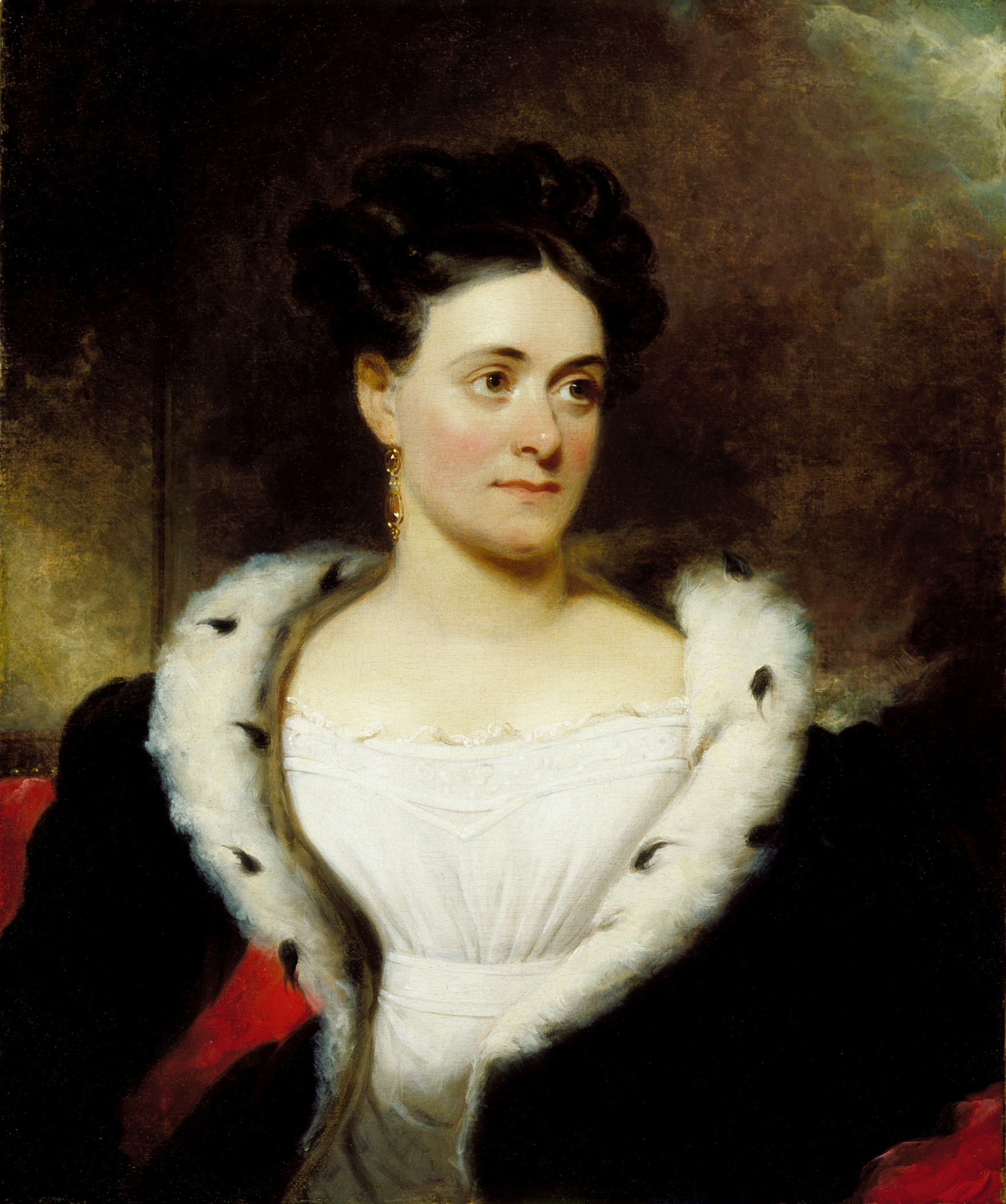
Susan Johnstone by Henry Inman in about 1828

Susan Johnstone, also known as Mrs. James William Wallack (29 November 1792 – 25 December 1850) was an English-American actress of the 19th-century.

She was born as Georgiana Susannah Johnstone in Covent Garden in London in 1792, the only daughter of the actor, singer and comedian John Henry Johnstone (1749-1828), known as 'Irish' Johnstone with his second wife Ann Bolton (1771-1810), the daughter of a wine merchant, with whom he eloped. On the day of her baptism on 6 March 1793 Richard Barry, 7th Earl of Barrymore was to have been her sponsor but he was killed in a shooting accident the same day. On going on the stage herself she enjoyed a successful career and excelled in comic roles. In 1817 she married the actor and theatrical producer James William Wallack at Lambeth in 1818, appearing with him in New York and on tour. The couple appeared in the United States frequently thereafter. They had four sons: John Johnstone Wallack, known as Lester Wallack, who also became an actor; (1820–1888); James Price Wallack (1821–1846); Captain Henry Jobling Wallack (1823–1900), and Charles Saville Wallack (1826–1855).

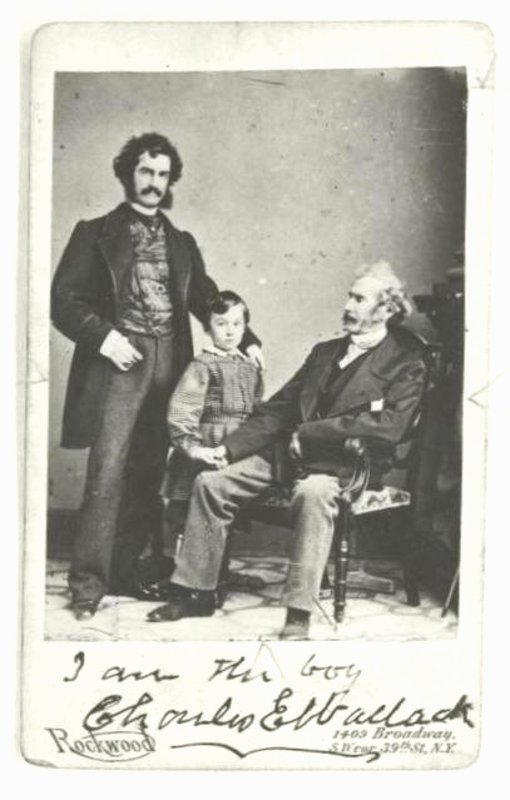
Johnstone's son Lester Wallack (left) and husband James William Wallack. The boy is Charles E. Wallack, Lester's son and Johnstone's grandson. Photo by Rockwood

Her portrait was painted several times including by Henry Inman in about 1828, one of a small series he painted of theatrical figures. Another by Thomas Sully entitled 'Portrait of Mrs. Wallack' was exhibited at the Pennsylvania Academy of the Fine Arts in 1819.

Susan Johnstone Wallack died suddenly in St. Giles in London in 1850.
