= Charles Frederic Ulrich =

American painter

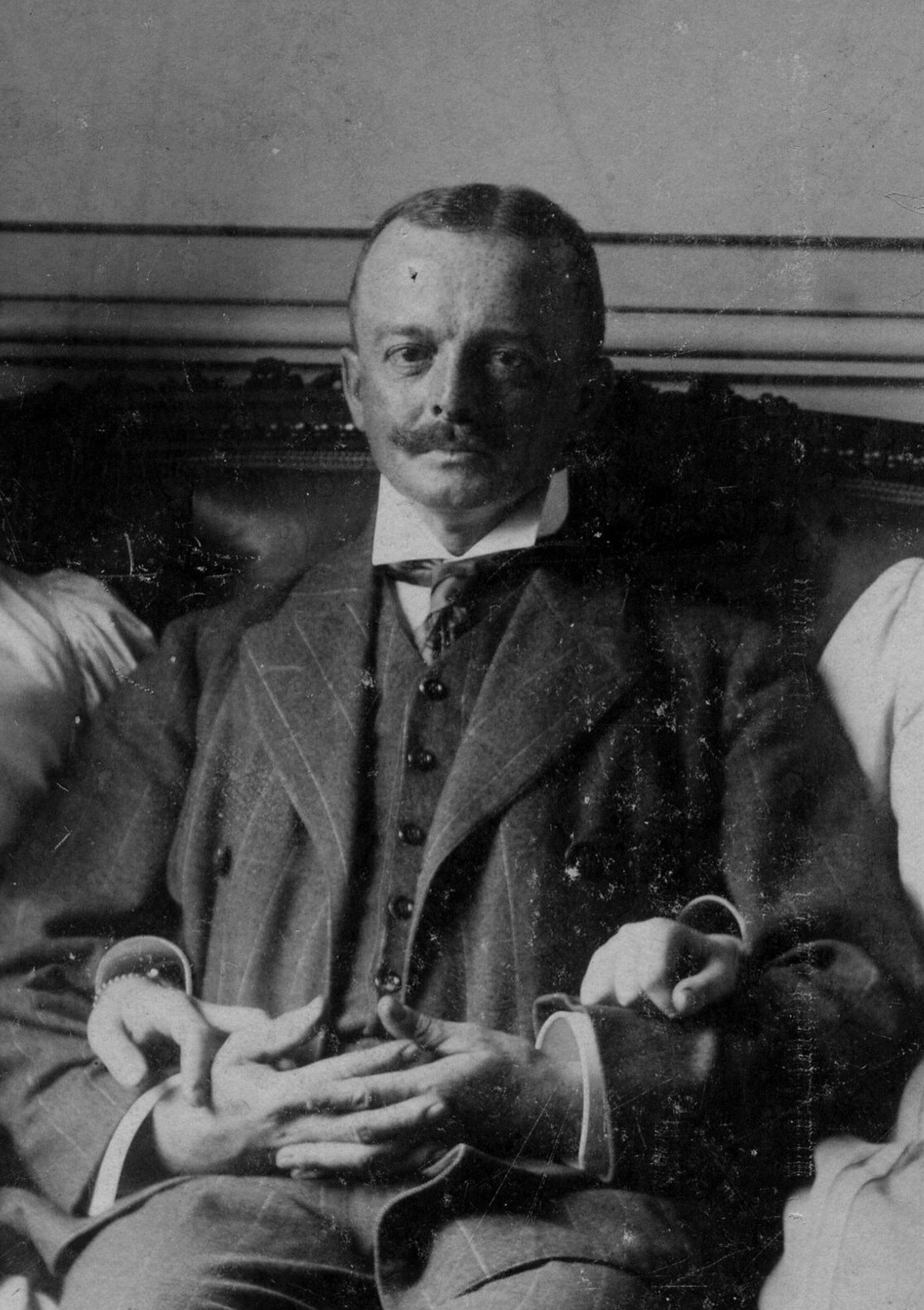
Charles Frederic Ulrich, c.1895

Charles Frederic Ulrich (18 October 1858 – 15 May 1908) was an American Realist painter who spent most of his career in Germany. He is best known for his genre scenes of working-class people.

== Biography ==
He was born in New York City. His father, Friedrich, was from Germany. Ulrich began his art studies at the National Academy of Design and the Cooper Union. In 1875, after completing his work there, he took his first trip to Germany; visiting Munich, where he enrolled at the Academy of Fine Arts. His primary instructors were Ludwig von Löfftz and Wilhelm von Lindenschmit. He also became friends with John Henry Twachtman and joined the circle of American-born artists who associated with Frank Duveneck in Munich and the Bavarian town of Polling.

Between 1879 and 1881, Ulrich was back in the United States, where he made a study of the methods used by artists during the Golden Age of Dutch painting; especially the interiors of Pieter de Hooch and Jan Vermeer and the portraits of Frans Hals and Anthony van Dyck. In 1883, he was named an Associate Member of his alma mater, the National Academy, and a full member of the Society of American Artists. He soon became one of the few artists of that period to deal with the depiction of social issues. A notable work from this time was In the Land of Promise (1884), showing an immigrant in the reception station at Castle Garden.

This attracted the attention of Thomas B. Clarke, a lace and linen manufacturer who was also a collector of contemporary art. Ulrich painted Clarke's portrait and Clarke promoted his career, awarding him the first Thomas B. Clarke Prize for "Best American Figure Composition".

In the summer of 1884, Ulrich returned to Europe; travelling with William Merritt Chase and Robert Frederick Blum. They visited Belgium and the Netherlands. Ulrich and Blum shared an apartment in Haarlem. They were together for much of the next three years. Blum concentrated on scenes from everyday life, while Ulrich continued to focus on social commentary; including paintings done from sketches made in an orphanage.

Europe became his home. The year 1886 found him living in Venice, followed by the Netherlands in 1890. He also visited Venice repeatedly after 1890 and, from 1899 to 1902, lived in Rome. In 1888 and 1892, he organized exhibits of American art in Munich. He, himself, exhibited at the London Royal Academy of Arts and the Glaspalast and, in 1893, joined the Berlin Secession at the Große Berliner Kunstausstellung.

In 1897, he married Margarethe Oppenheim (1877–1939), daughter of the banker, Hugo Oppenheim. In 1906, his name appears on the membership list of the Deutscher Künstlerbund, making him one of its earliest members.

Ulrich died of pneumonia in Berlin in 1908.

== Selected paintings ==
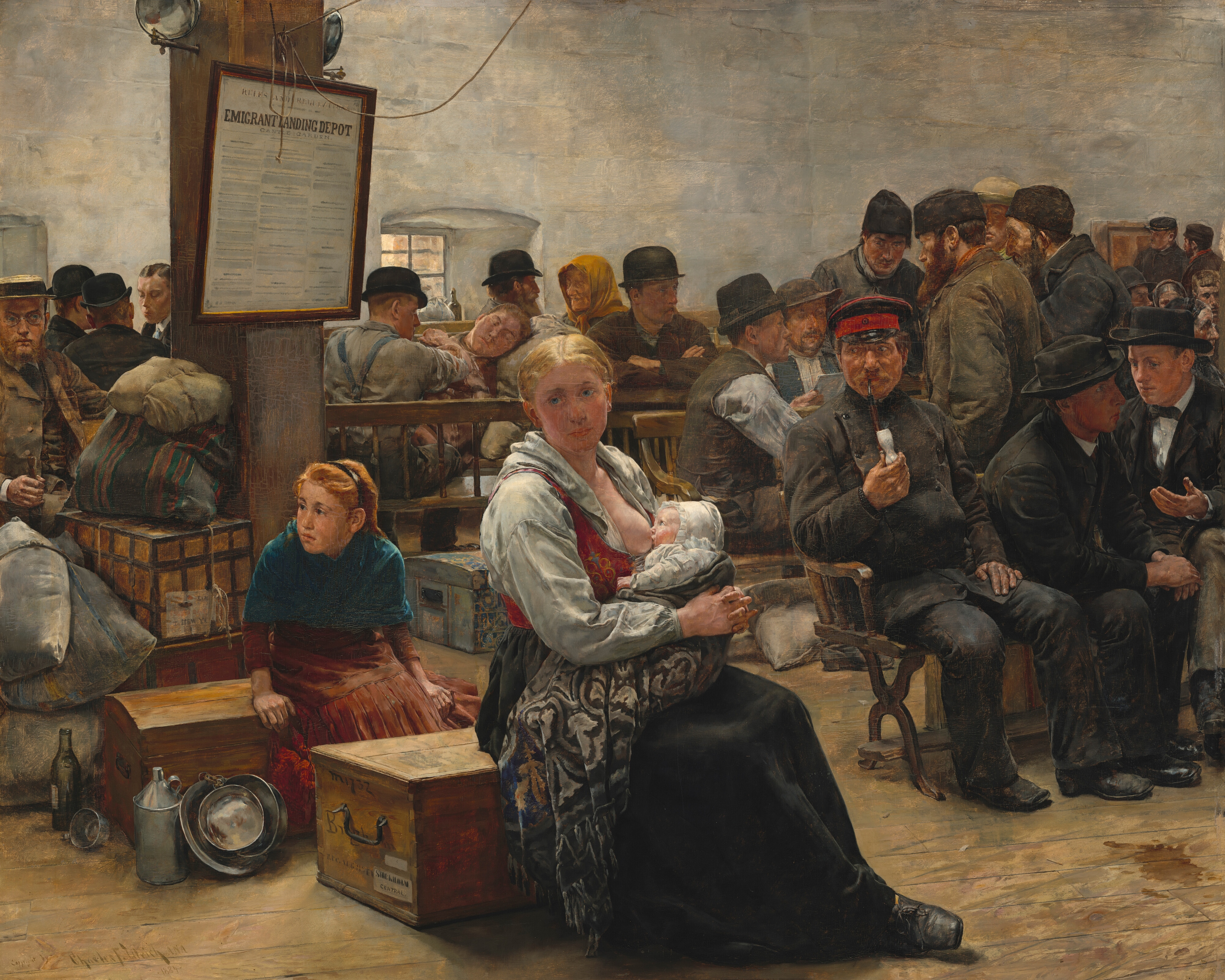
In the Land of Promise, Castle Garden, 1884, National Gallery of Art

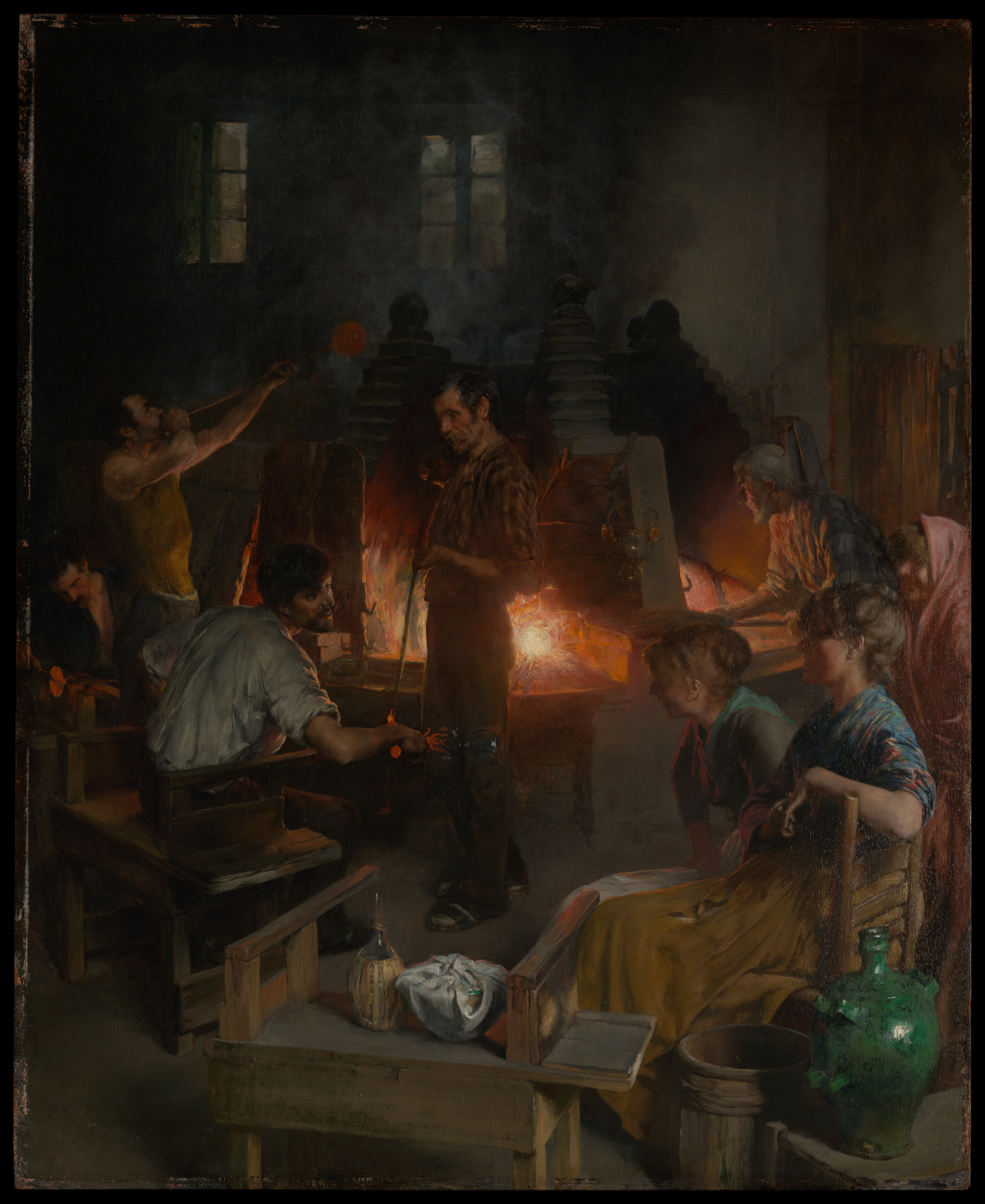
Glass Blowers of Murano, 1886, Metropolitan Museum of Art

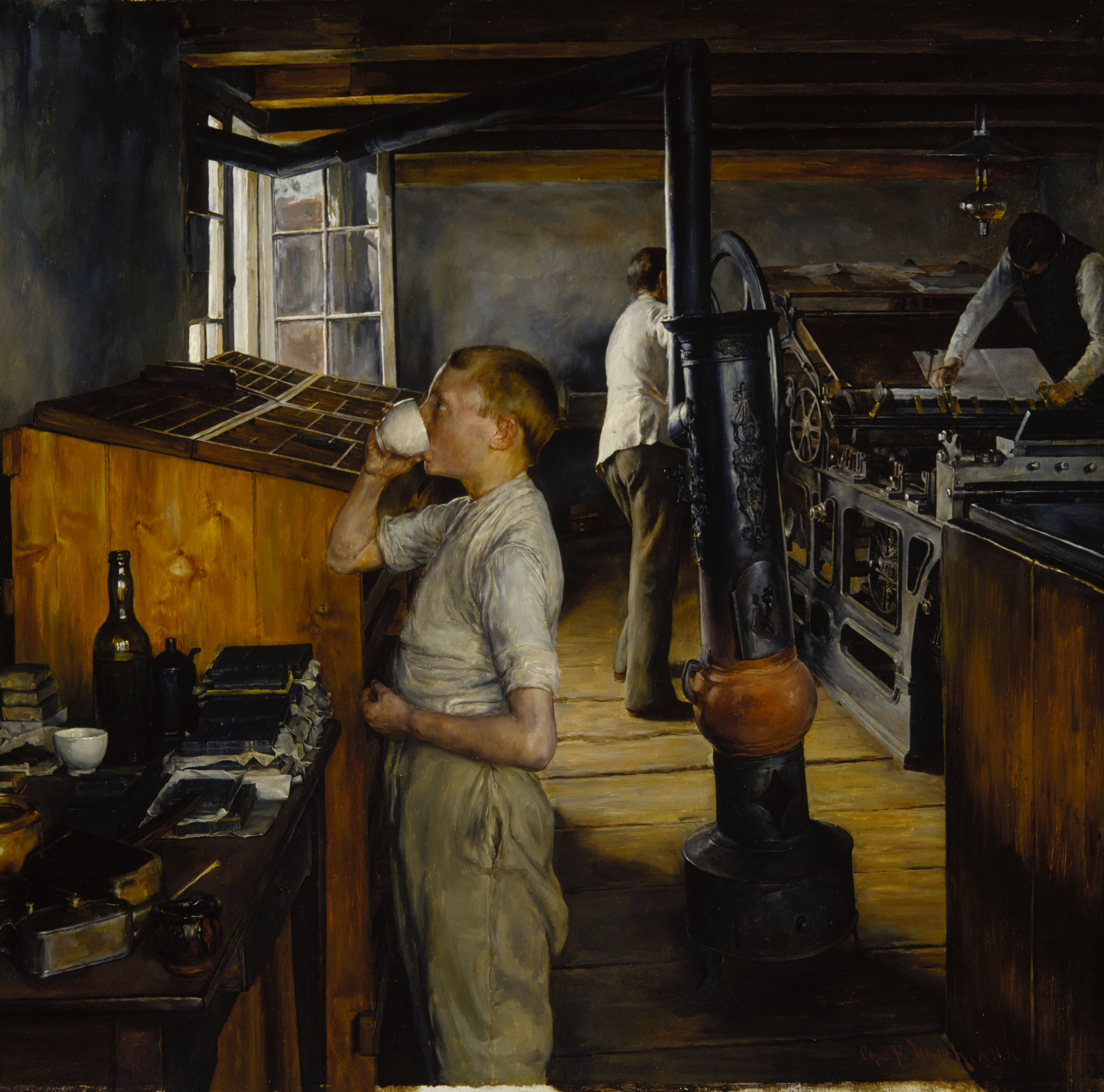
The Village Printing Shop, Haarlem, the Netherlands, 1884

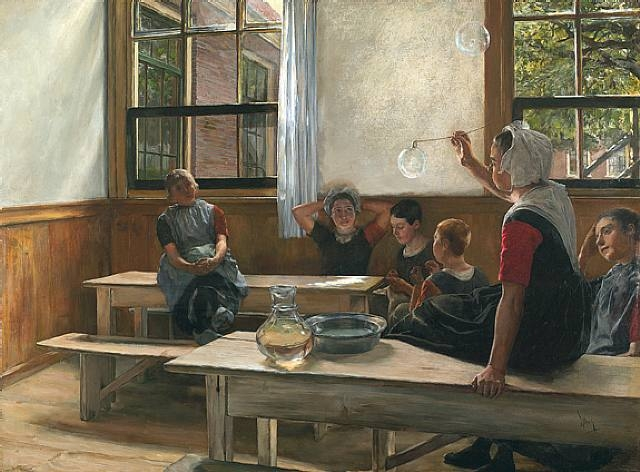
Waifs in an Orphanage, 1884
