= The Bowery Boys: New York City History =

History podcast

The Bowery Boys: New York City History is a travel and history podcast that was launched in June 2007 by Thomas Meyers and Gregory Young. Podcast episodes focus on the history of one person, place, or event in New York City history. As of October 2025, the Bowery Boys have produced 471 episodes.

== History ==
=== 2007–2008: Early episodes from the Bowery ===
While both Greg Young and Tom Meyers live in the New York City area, they are both from the Midwest. Greg Young is from Springfield, Missouri, and attended Missouri State University and received a Bachelor of Journalism from the Missouri School of Journalism at the University of Missouri in 1993, with a minor in history. Tom Meyers was born and raised in Bellevue, Ohio, and graduated from Columbia College (New York) in 1997.

Young and Meyers met through Meyers' sister Elizabeth Meyers Hendrickson, who was studying journalism at the University of Missouri.

In 2007 Young and Meyers wanted to do a podcast on New York City theatre or history. Using the app GarageBand they recorded their first podcast, "NYC Cast," which was an unresearched tale about Canal Street. which was outside of Meyers apartment in the Bowery neighborhood. Meyers said, "It was off the top of our heads — no research, just shenanigans. Quality control did not exist...We just wanted to experiment to see if it could gain any momentum." The show quickly evolved into a more focused history podcast .

The show, which was initially set in their neighborhood, is also a play on the 19th-century gang the Bowery Boys and the Hollywood acting troupe The Bowery Boys.

=== 2009–2016: Awards and first book ===
In 2009 and 2011 the podcast was nominated for best travel podcast in the Podcast Awards. The UK Daily Telegraph named the program among its list of best travel podcasts.

In 2013 NPR featured the pair on their "Morning Edition" program.

In 2014 Guides Association of New York City ("GANYC") awarded it for "Outstanding Achievement in Radio Program/Podcasts".

In June 2016, their book The Bowery Boys: Adventures in Old New York: An Unconventional Exploration of Manhattan's Historic Neighborhoods, Secret Spots and Colorful Characters was released.

=== 2017–present: Annual Live Halloween Show, Bowery Boys Walks, and the Official HBO Gilded Age Podcast ===
In 2017 Meyers and Young were awarded a Spotlight Award from the Mayor's Office of Media and Entertainment (MOME), recognizing their "significant contributions to the growth of NYC's thriving media and entertainment industries."

In 2018 they began hosting an annual Halloween show at Joe's Pub, where they told New York ghost stories, and they launched Bowery Boys Walks, a walking tour company with a focus on New York City history.

In 2021 they launched The Gilded Gentleman history podcast hosted by Carl Raymond. The Bowery Boys produce the show.

In 2022 Meyers began co-hosting the official companion podcast for The Gilded Age (TV series) on HBO for seasons 1-3 with author and TV host Alicia Malone.

In 2025, they won a Webby Award for Best History Podcast (Individual Episode) for the first part of their Amsterdam/New Amsterdam mini series, titled "Empire of the Seas".

== Format ==
Most Bowery Boys episodes frequently take the form of a conversation between the two hosts and are often centered on a particular place or person. For instance, their 50th episode concerns the history of Collect Pond, while their 100th episode regards the life of Robert Moses. They are also known for their annual Halloween episode, which usually focuses on New York City ghost stories, sometimes dating as far back as the 17th century. There are also shorter episodes featuring Young or Meyers alone, expounding on smaller topics.
