= Castles in the Air (musical) =

- Music: Percy Wenrich; R. Locke
- Lyrics: Raymond Wilson Peck
- Book: Raymond Wilson Peck
- Premiere: September 6, 1926: Selwyn Theatre
- Productions: Broadway

Castles in the Air is a musical comedy, with a book and lyrics by Raymond Wilson Peck and music by Percy Wenrich (additional lyrics by R. Locke). The story concerns two young men, Monty Blair and John Brown, who mistake an exclusive Westchester resort for an inn. They decide to pretend to be nobility, and Monty introduces John as a Latvian prince. Evelyn's uncle Philip decides to teach her a lesson about social climbing by taking her to Latvia, intending to expose John as an impostor. The plan backfires, though, because John really is a prince.

The musical opened on Broadway in the Selwyn Theatre on September 6, 1926. It moved to the Century Theatre on December 6, 1926. The production was directed by Frank S. Merlin and choreographed by John Boyle and Julian Mitchell. It starred J. Harold Murray as John and Vivienne Segal as Evelyn.

On June 29, 1927, a production opened in London, at the Shaftesbury Theatre.

== Roles and original cast ==
- Monty Blair – Bernard Granville
- John Brown – J. Harold Murray
- Evelyn Devine – Vivienne Segal
- Philip Rodman – Stanley Forde
- General Slodak – Walter Edwin
- Count Draga – Richard Farrell
- Lieutenant – Edward Gorman
- Kemlar – William Hasson
- The Queen Regent – Thais Lawton
- Mme. Joujou Durant – Claire Madjette
- The Chancellor – Gregory Ratoff
- George Sedgwick – Allen Waterous
- Annie Moore – Joyce White
- Amos – Robert Williamson

== Musical numbers ==
Act 1

- I Don't Blame 'Em – Annie Moore and Boys
- Love's Refrain – Mme. Joujou Durant and Ensemble
- Lantern of Love (Lyrics By R. Locke and Raymond W. Peck) – Evelyn Devine and Ensemble
- The Singer's Career, Ha! Ha! – Mme. Joujou Durant and Philip Rodman
- The Other Fellow's Girl – Monty Blair, Sextette and Ensemble
- If You Are in Love with a Girl – John Brown and Ensemble
- The Sweetheart of Your Dream – Evelyn Devine
- I Would Like to Fondle You – Annie Moore, Monty Blair, Sextette and Ensemble
- The Rainbow of Your Smile – John Brown

Act 2

- Baby – Monty Blair and Ensemble
- Latavia – John Brown and Ensemble
- Land of Romance – Evelyn Devine
- My Lips, My Love, My Soul! – John Brown and Evelyn Devine
- The Latavian Chant – Annie Moore and Ensemble

Act 3

- Girls and the Gimmies – Monty Blair, Sextette and Ensemble
- Love Rules the World – Mme. Joujou Durant and John Brown
