= GANYC =

Professional association of licensed New York City tour guides

- Formation: 1974; 52 years ago
- Type: Professional trade association
- Headquarters: New York City, United States
- Location: New York City
- Members: 341
- Official language: Multiple spoken by member guides
- President: Michael Morgenthal
- Key people: Beth Goffe (Vice President), Katherine Hill (Vice President), Sara Lyons (Treasurer), Leigh Hallingby (Secretary), Mitch Paluszek (Secretary)
- Website: www.ganyc.org

GANYC (Guides Association of New York City) is the professional association of licensed New York City tour guides.

Established in 1974, it is one of the oldest tour guide associations in the United States. GANYC is a member of the World Federation of Tourist Guide Associations. With a present count of approximately 371 members, GANYC represents nearly 10% of the guides licensed in New York City with an estimated 4,000 guides currently licensed by the Department of Consumer and Worker Protection.

The organization's mission is provide continuing education about touring through a series of internal and external programs. It also advocates on behalf of New York tourism industry workers, such as in response to overtourism concerns at the Statue of Liberty in 2019 or after tourism shutdowns during the COVID-19 pandemic. They have also worked with city agencies on behalf of better conditions for tourists, including an ongoing legislative battle involving sightseeing bus guides. It has also acted as an aid in finding government assistance for its constituents, such as after the September 11th attacks in 2001.

The organization is run by an all-volunteer Executive Board, with elections occurring among its membership every two years.

== History ==
GANYC was founded as the Multilingual Guides Association of New York City in 1974. In 1979, the organization changed its name to the Guides Association of New York City to better reflect its growing recognition outside of New York as the professional organization for tour guides in New York City. In 2012, GANYC began to hold its monthly meetings at various sites of historic and cultural significance and also introduced industry partner membership and strategic affiliations to more closely engage with businesses and organizations interested in supported tour guiding. Its membership provides tours in all five NYC boroughs and covers approximately 10% of all New York City sightseeing guide licensees.

== GANYC Apple Awards ==
GANYC hosts an annual awards ceremony to honor the best in New York City culture, preservation and tourism in a dozen categories.

Previous hosts have included Tony award-winning broadway musical star Brian Stokes Mitchell, cabaret performer Mark Nadler, and podcast hosts the Bowery Boys.
