= Bijou Theatre (Manhattan, 1878) =

Former theatre in Manhattan, New York

Coordinates: 40.74721°N 73.988584°W

1239 Broadway
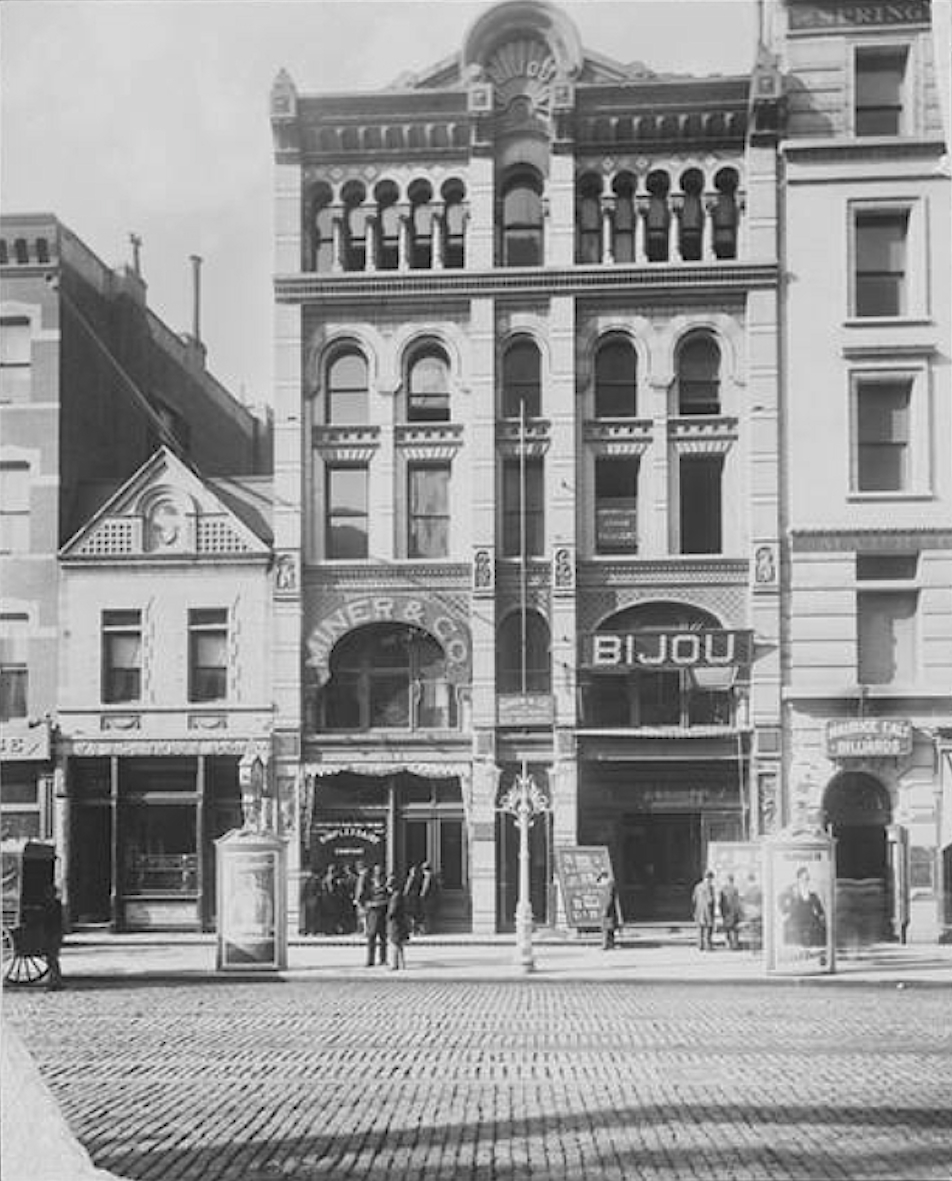
- 1239 Broadway

General information
- Location: 1239 Broadway (Manhattan), New York City, New York, U.S.
- Opened: 1878 (148 years ago)
- Demolished: 1915 (111 years ago)

The Bijou Theatre was a former Broadway theater in New York City that opened in 1878 as Theatre Brighton and was demolished in 1915. It also served as an opera house and silent movie venue throughout its history.

== History ==
Located at 1239 Broadway, between 30th and 31st Streets, the building had been converted from a drinking and gambling establishment into a theatre for variety, and opened August 26, 1878, with Jerry Thomas as proprietor. The house had many changes and names until John A. McCaull, a Baltimore lawyer, and Charles E. Ford took charge of it. After briefly closing Considerable money was spent to refurbish and modernize the theatre for its reopening on March 31, 1880, where it was rebranded as the Bijou Opera-house. In 1881 and 1882, Lillian Russell appeared in three different operettas.

But the house proved too small to be profitable, so after the performance of July 7, 1883, preparations for tearing it down began. R. E. J. Miles and Gen. W. B. Barton leased the premises for five years from its owner, Edward F. James. They agreed to advance sufficient funds to erect a new house, which was designed by J. B. McElfatrick & Son and opened December 1, 1883, as the Bijou Theatre. The first production was Orpheus and Eurydice, an adaption by Max Freeman of Jacques Offenbach's Orfée aux enfers."

Adonis, starring Henry E. Dixey, played its record-breaking run of 603 performances at the Bijou beginning September 4, 1884. Another long run was The Music Master, starring David Warfield, transferred from the Belasco Theatre on January 9, 1905, and playing 511 performances, for a total at the two theaters of 635, before closing September 29, 1906.

The next big hit was A Gentleman from Mississippi, starring Thomas A. Wise and Douglas Fairbanks, which opened September 29, 1908. From June 29 to August 7, 1909, it played at the Aerial Gardens atop the New Amsterdam Theatre, with new scenery and costumes, moving back to the Bijou August 9. After giving its 400th performance (counting the Aerial Gardens) on August 25, the play closed on September 18.

The Bijou was later used as a silent movie house. It was demolished in 1915 and replaced by the present high-rise office building, which opened in 1917.

== Selected shows ==
- Adonis (1884–86; 603 performances)
- A Midnight Bell (1889; 136 performances)
- The Widow Jones (1895; basis for the 1896 Edison short film The Kiss
- Courted Into Court (1896–97; 140 performances)
- Sister Mary by Glen MacDonough (1889–1900; 120 performances)
- Aunt Hannah (1900; 21 performances)
- The Climbers by Clyde Fitch (1901; 163 performances)
- The Auctioneer by Charles Klein (1901; 105 performances)
- Nancy Brown (1903; 104 performances) (Note: IBDB reports the performance count of Nancy Brown on Broadway as 112 performances. This number was arrived at by adding the 104 performances at the Bijou Theatre to a later return engagement at Broadway's Grand Opera House in October–November 1903 when eight further performances were given; making a total of 112 performances of the work given in Broadway theaters collectively.)
- A Gentleman from Mississippi (1908–09)
- The Music Master (1905–06; 627 performances, counting 124 performances at the Belasco)
- The Lottery Man (1909–10; 200 performances)

== See also ==
- List of Broadway theaters § Demolished Broadway theaters
