= Courted Into Court =

Play by John J. McNally

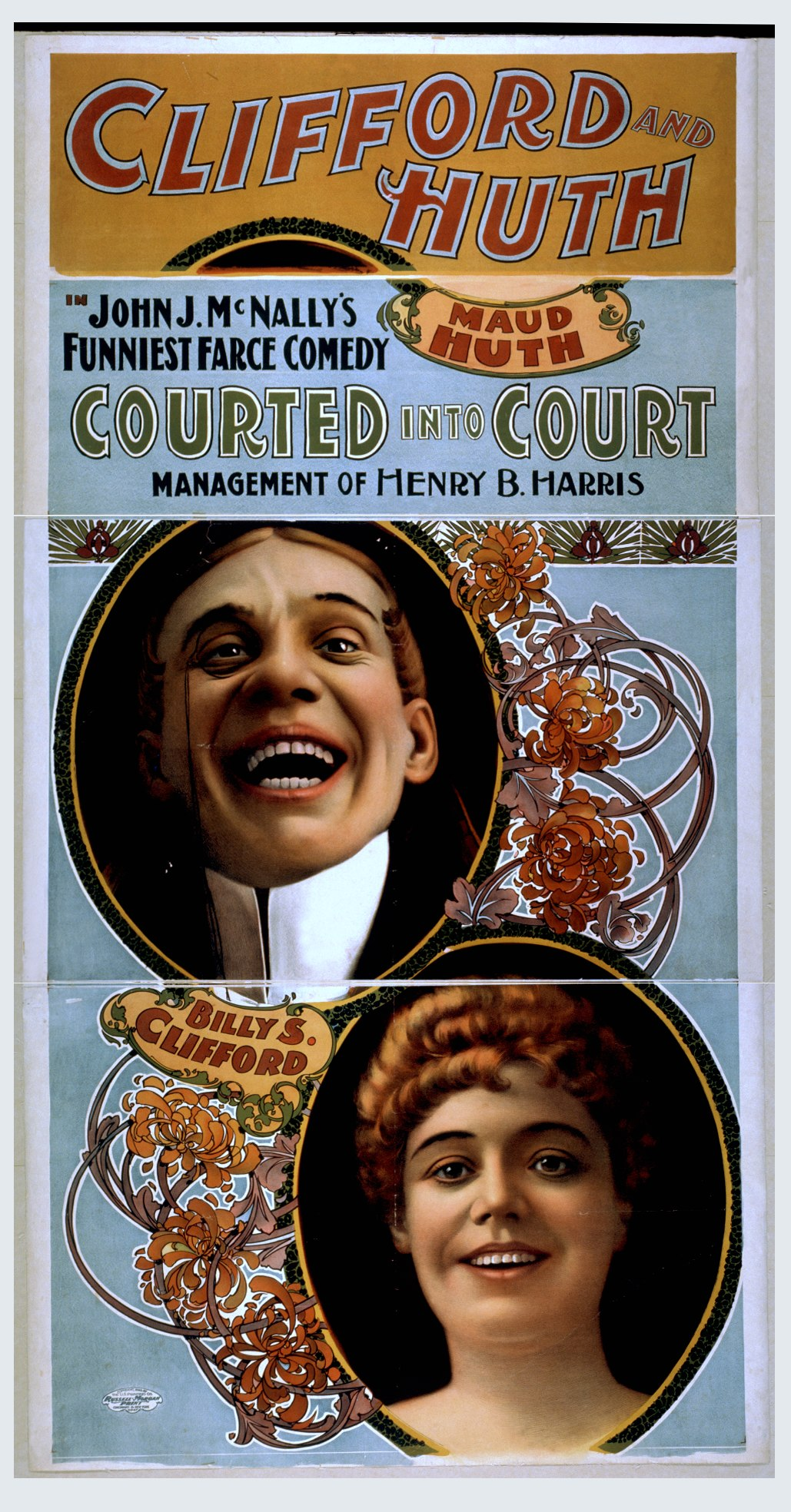
- Original language: English
- Genre: Play

Premiere
- Date premiered: December 29, 1896
- Place premiered: Bijou Theatre

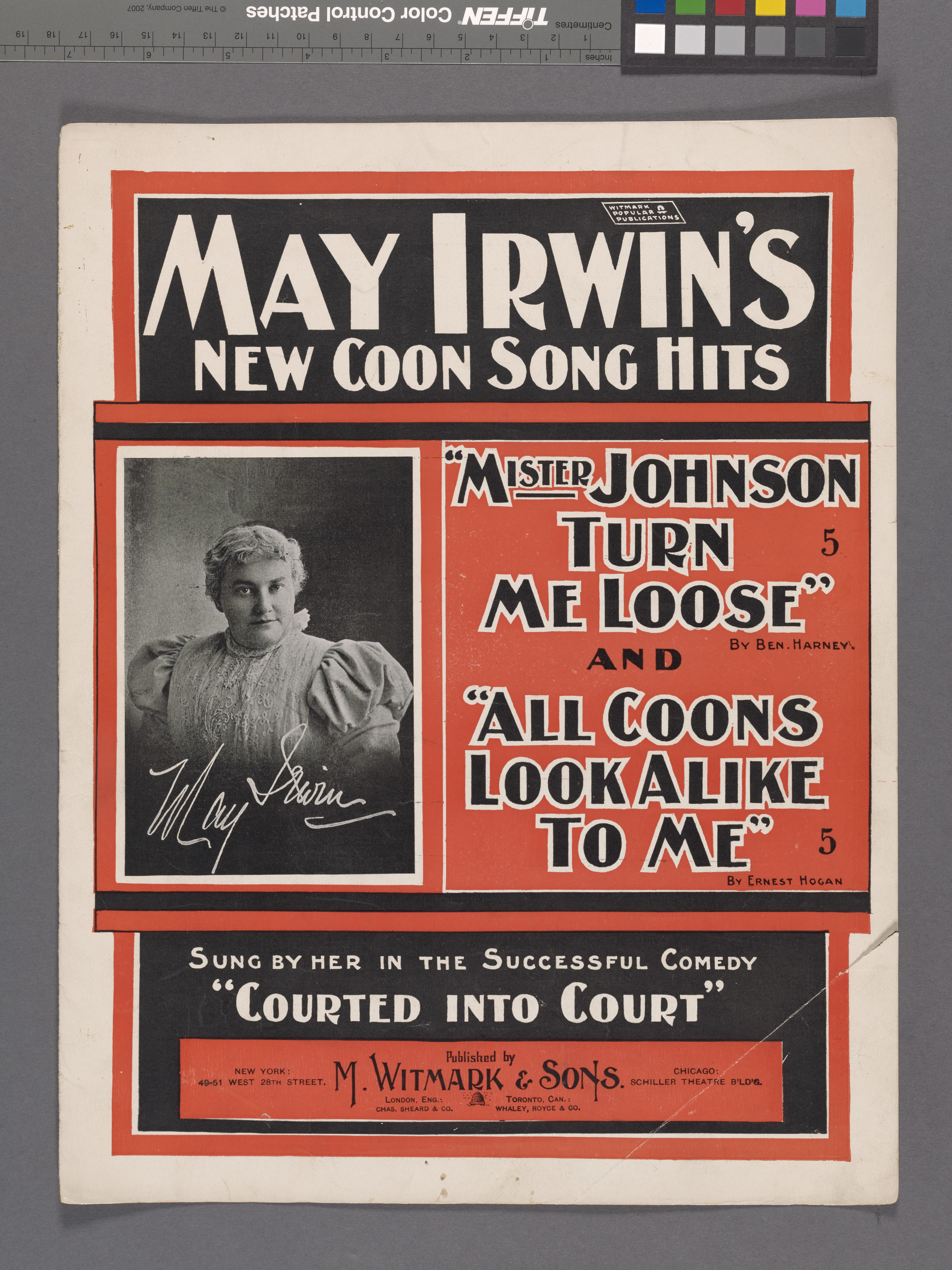
The cover of sheet music featuring Irwin's coon songs used in this play.

Courted Into Court is an 1896 play by John J. McNally. It was produced by Charles T. Rich and William Harris for a 140 performance run at the Bijou Theatre on Broadway starting on December 29, 1896.

Prior to its Broadway debut, it played first on any stage in Omaha, Nebraska, on December 4, 1896, and then moved to Kansas City. and Chicago.

Star May Irwin sang and helped popularize (the now notorious example) coon song "All Coons Look Alike to Me" by Ernest Hogan in the play, which had an all-white cast. She also sang the coon song, "Mr. Johnson, Turn Me Loose" in the play, a song later remembered in all of Irwin's major obituaries.

== Cast ==
- May Irwin at Dottie Dimple
- John C. Rice as Worthington Best, Sr.
- Raymond Hitchcock as Worthington Best, Jr.
- Clara Palmer as Mrs. Worthington Best, Sr.
- Hattie Williams as Helen Best
- Ada Lewis as Mademoiselle Nocodi
- George W. Barnum as Gen. Baron Vladimir Vladistoff
- Joseph M. Sparks as Judge Jeremiah Geoghan
- Jacques Kruger as Pop Dooley
- Sally Cohen as Sylvia Rosebud
- Roland Carter as Mortimer Morton and Sharp Lawyer
- Eva Gilroy as Gertie
