= A Gentleman from Mississippi =

1908 play by Harrison Rhodes and Thomas A. Wise and 1914 film

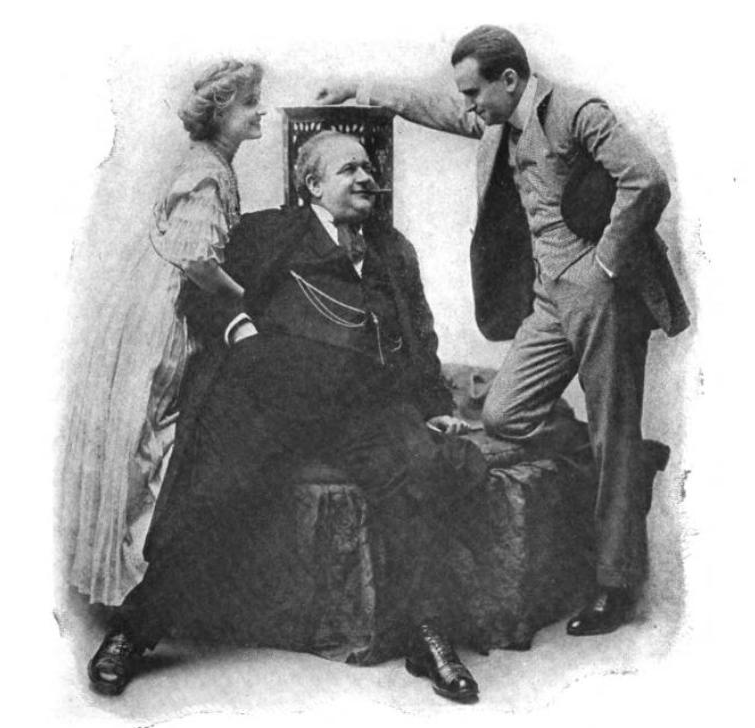
- Lola May, Thomas A. Wise, and Douglas Fairbanks in scene from play
- Original language: English
- Written by: Harrison Rhodes and Thomas A. Wise
- Subject: Political corruption
- Genre: Comedy
- Setting: Washington, D.C.

Premiere
- Date: 28 September 1908 (Broadway)
- Place: Bijou Theatre

A Gentleman from Mississippi is a 1908 comedic play by Harrison Rhodes and Thomas A. Wise. It was popular when released, debuting on Broadway on September 28, 1908, and playing for 407 performances at the Bijou Theatre, and on the roof garden of the New Amsterdam Theatre during the summer of 1909. Douglas Fairbanks played the leading role of Bud Haines.

Receiving positive reviews from the critics, it was produced by William A. Brady and Joseph R. Grismer, and was one of the "major hits of its day." U.S. President Theodore Roosevelt saw the play shortly before its Broadway debut at a Washington warm-up performance at the National Theatre, and proclaimed it a "perfectly corking play. Bully! A ripper!" Roosevelt's successor, William Howard Taft, also later saw and approved of the play, and was featured in some of the play's advertising.

It was adapted into a novel based on the play's success, and the play traveled widely after closing on Broadway, where actor Burr McIntosh returned from the stage after a long break to take over for Wise.

The play was also made into a silent film in 1914, where Wise reprised his role, and a young Evelyn Brent was also in the cast. A plan to make another film based on the play in 1936 was never completed.

Harrison and Rhodes also collaborated on a second play, An Old New Yorker (1911).

== Plot ==
The play's setting is Washington, D.C., where corrupt Senators are attempting to profit off a planned naval base in Mississippi. William Langdon (played by Wise), the junior senator from Mississippi, decides to fight the scheme, assisted by his private secretary Bud Haines (played by Fairbanks).

== Original Broadway cast ==
- Thomas A. Wise as William A. Langdon
- W.J. Brady as Horatio Peabody
- Hal De Forrest as James Stevens
- Ernest Baxter as Chares Norton
- Stanhope Wheatcroft as Randolph Langdon
- Douglas Fairbanks as "Bud" Haines
- Harry Stubbs as Dick Cullen
- Frederick Bock as Colonel Beverly Stoneman
- E.H. Bender as Clerk at International Hotel
- Charles Chappelle as Colonel J.D. Telfer
- M.W. Rale as Signore Caracioli
- Donald Mackintire as a Bridegroom
- Henry Gibson as a Porter
- Charles Johnson as a Bellboy
- Harriet Worthington as Carolina Langdon
- Lola May as Hope Georgia Langdon
- Agnes De Lane as Amelia Butterworth
- Karen Nielsen as Mme. Des Aretins
- Sallie Livingston as a Bride
