= May Irwin =

Canadian-American actress and singer

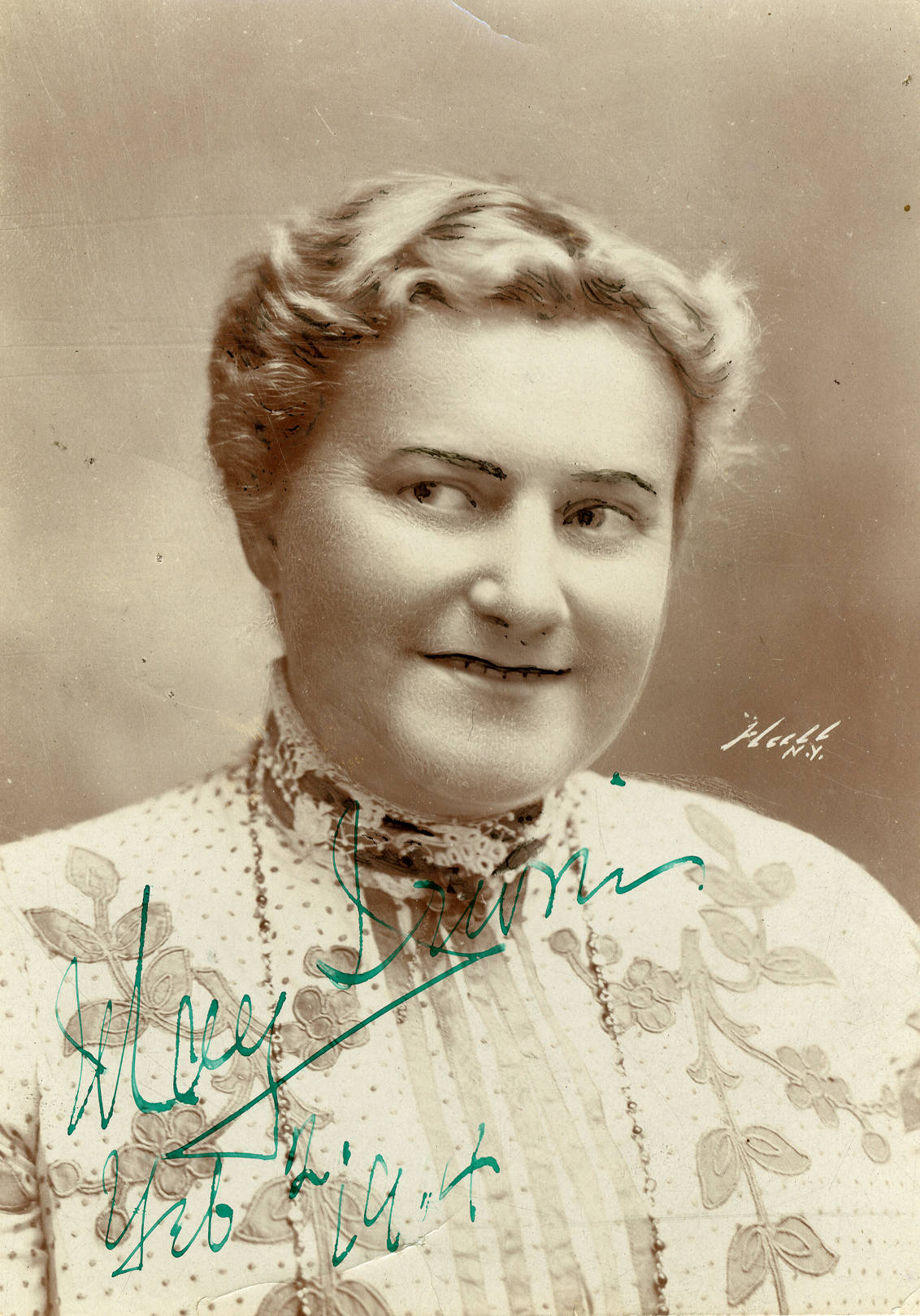
- Irwin in 1905
- Born: Georgina May Campbell; June 27, 1862; Whitby, Canada West
- Died: October 22, 1938 (aged 76); New York City, U.S.
- Occupations: Actress, singer
- Years active: 1870s–1922
- Spouses: Frederick W. Keller (m. 1879; died 1886) Kurt Eisenfeldt (m. 1907)
- Children: 2

May Irwin Kiss, recorded in April 1896 by Thomas Edison

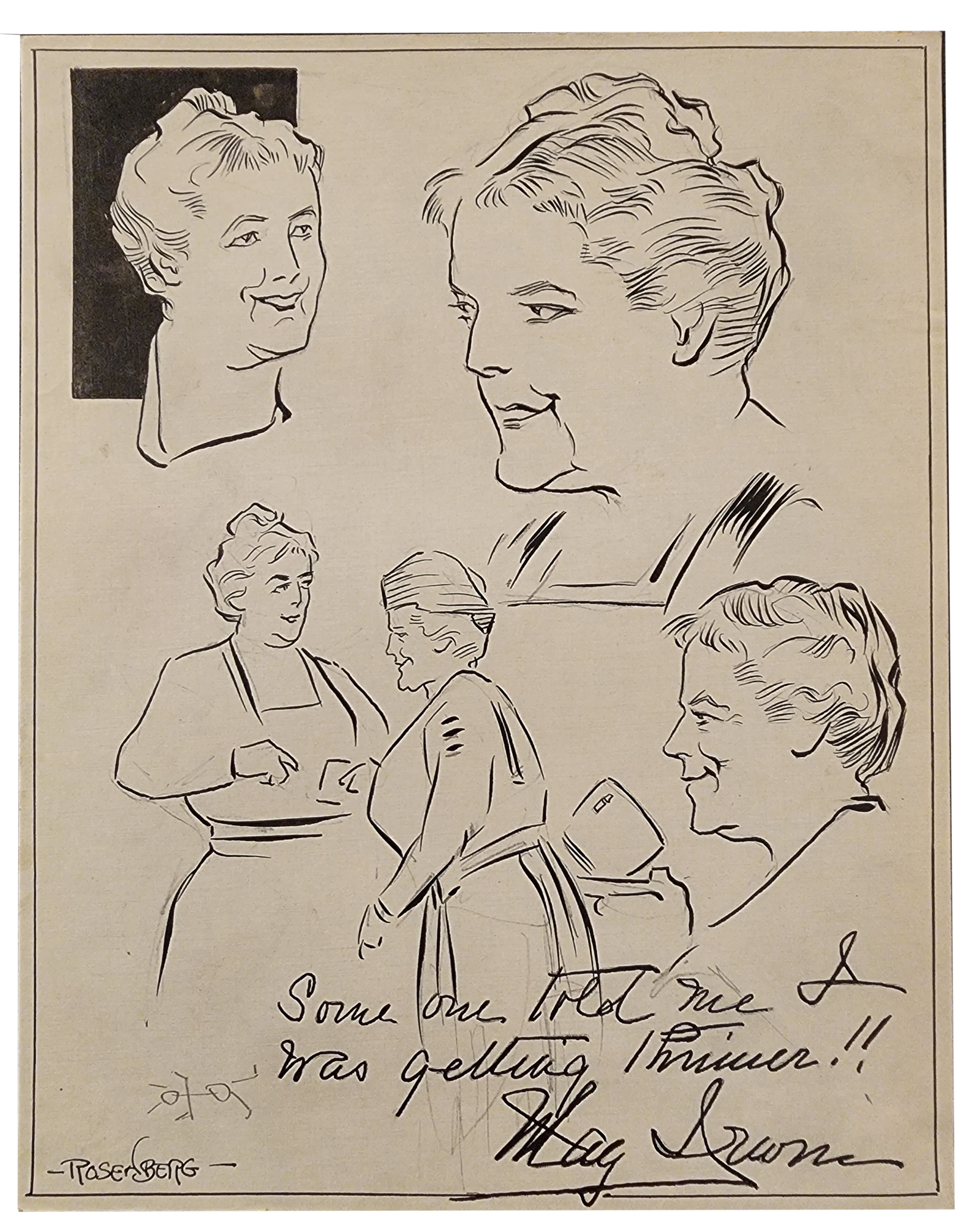
Signed drawings of May Irwin by Manuel Rosenberg for the Cincinnati Post 1920

May Irwin (born Georgina May Campbell; June 27, 1862 – October 22, 1938) was a Canadian born American actress, singer, theatrical producer and star of vaudeville, and rose to prominence in the Gilded Age. She was a child star performing in a troupe headed by Tony Pastor alongside her sister Flo Irwin, and their success on stage saved the family from poverty after the untimely death of her father. She was among one of the earliest performers to record commercially and appeared in The Kiss, one of the first commercially distributed films. In 1892 she founded The May Irwin Company, making her one of the first women to own and operate her own theatrical enterprise.

== Early life and career ==
Born on June 27, 1862, in Whitby, Canada West, as Georgina May Campbell, her father, Robert E. Campbell, died when she was 13 years old; her stage-minded mother, Sophoria Jane Draper, in need of money, encouraged May and her older sister Adeline Flora ("Flo" or "Addie") to perform. They created a singing act, billed as the "Irwin Sisters," that debuted at the Adelphi Theatre in nearby Buffalo, New York in December 1874. By late 1877, their careers had progressed and they were booked to appear at New York's Metropolitan Theater, then at the Tony Pastor Theatre, a popular New York City music hall.

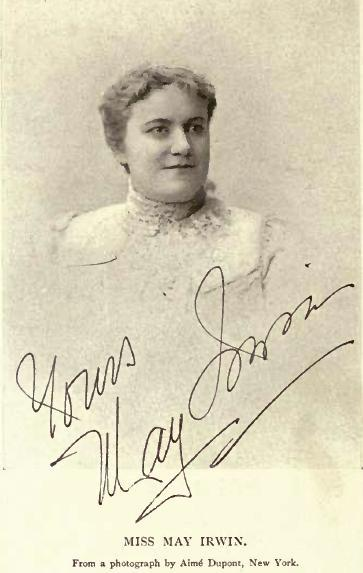
Miss May Irwin

The sisters proved popular enough to earn regular spots for the ensuing six years, after which 21-year-old May set out on her own. She joined Augustin Daly's stock company from 1883 to 1887, where she made her first appearance on the theatrical stage. This comedian was known for her improvisation skills. An immediate success, she went on to make her London stage debut at Toole's Theatre in August 1884. By the age of 25, she was earning $2,500 a week. In 1886, her husband of eight years, Frederick W. Keller, died unexpectedly. Her sister Flora married New York State Senator Thomas F. Grady.

May Irwin was an anti-suffragist who was quoted in Volume II 1910-1920 of This Fabulous Century Sixty Years of American Life to have said "I am sick to death of this shriek for women's rights. It is doing more harm than good among women. I wish all women felt as I do; I have more rights now than I can properly attend to."

== The May Irwin Company ==
In March 1891 May Irwin resigned from "Russell's Comedians" the touring company that performed City Directory, due to a falling out with management. The next year she founded The May Irwin Company, making her possibly the first women in American entertainment industry to produce and control her own entertainment enterprise.

She still headlined the shows, and the company toured for over a decade, performing in major venues and theatres in New York, Boston, Chicago, SanFrancisco, Pittsburgh, and other cities.

In the 1895 Broadway show The Widow Jones, she introduced "The Bully Song", which became her signature number. The performance also featured a lingering kiss, which was seen by Thomas Edison, who hired Irwin and her co-star John C. Rice to repeat the scene on film. In 1896, Edison's Kinetoscope production, The Kiss, became the first screen kiss in cinematic history.

Productions included ''The Widow Jones'' (1895), ' "The Swell Miss Fitzswell", "Courted Into Court"(1896), "Kate Kip-Buyer"(1898), "Sister Mary"(1899).''The Belle of Bridgeport'' (1900), ''Mrs. Black Is Back'' (1903–06), and ''Getting A Polish'' (1910), among others. Irwin commissioned original works from playwright Glen McDonough, who later wrote the Broadway musical ''Babes in Toyland''(1903).

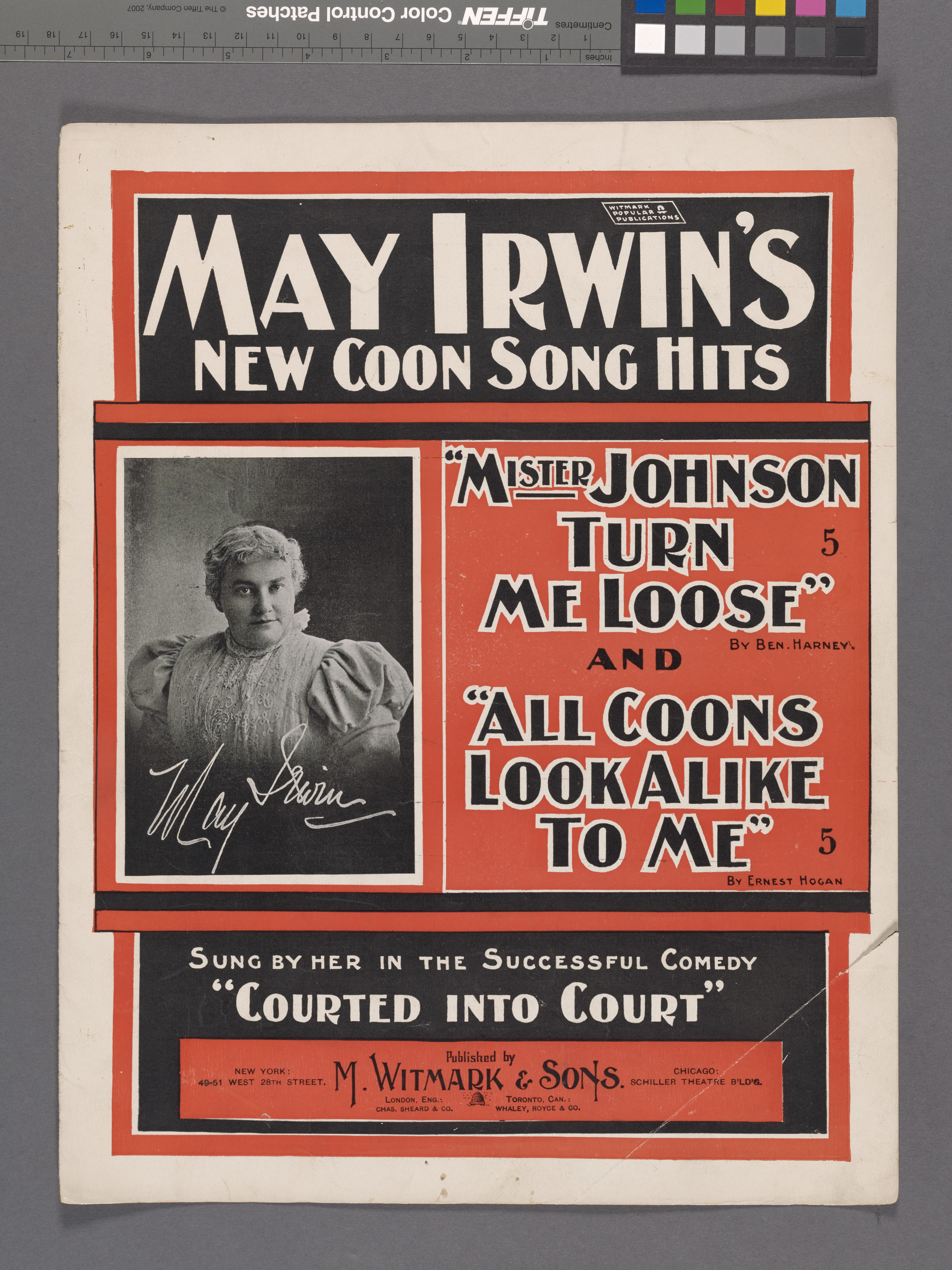
The cover of sheet music featuring one of Irwin's songs originally performed in the Broadway musical Courted Into Court.

In addition to her performing and singing, Irwin also wrote the lyrics to several songs, including "Hot Tamale Alley", with music written by George M. Cohan.

== Recordings and Film ==
In 1907 she married her manager, Kurt Eisfeldt, and began making records for Berliner/Victor. Several of these recordings survive and give a notion of the actress's appeal.

Irwin's buxom figure was much in vogue at the time and, combined with her charming personality, made her one of America's most beloved performers for more than thirty years. In 1914, she made her second silent film appearance, this time in the feature-length adaptation of George V. Hobart's play, Mrs. Black is Back, produced by Adolph Zukor's Famous Players Film Company and filmed for the most part at her own sprawling home in New York. Still pictures showing May survive from this movie.

== Real Estate Investments ==
Irwin was a shrewd investor and used her earnings as a performer to become a wealthy woman. She spent a great deal of time at a summer home on secluded Club Island, a small island off of Grindstone Island of the Thousand Islands, and at her winter home on Merritt Island, Florida, before retiring to a farm near Clayton, New York, where a street would eventually be named in her honor.

Irwin retired in 1925.

== Personal life ==
May Irwin was married twice. Her first marriage was to Frederick W. Keller, of St. Louis, from 1878 until his death in 1886. From 1907 to the end of her life, she was married to Kurt Eisfeldt. The couple lived at West 44th Street, New York.

Irwin had two sons by her first marriage, Walter Keller (born ca. 1879 - when she was 17) and Harry Keller (b. 1882 - when she was 20).

== Death ==
May Irwin died in New York City on October 22, 1938, aged 76. She is interred at Kensico Cemetery in Valhalla, NY.

== Filmography ==
Year	Title	Role	Notes
1896	The Kiss	The Widow Jones	Short
1905	The Whole Dam Family and the Dam Dog	Mrs. Dam	Short, uncredited
1914	Mrs. Black Is Back	Mrs. Black	
1915	The Incorrigible Dukane	A Charwoman	Uncredited
1936	Fashions in Love	—N/a	Short, archive footage

== Works cited ==
- Foster, Charles (2000). Stardust and Shadows: Canadians in Early Hollywood. Dundurn Press. ISBN 1-55002-348-9.
