= The Great Train Robbery (1903 film) =

American western film by Edwin S. Porter

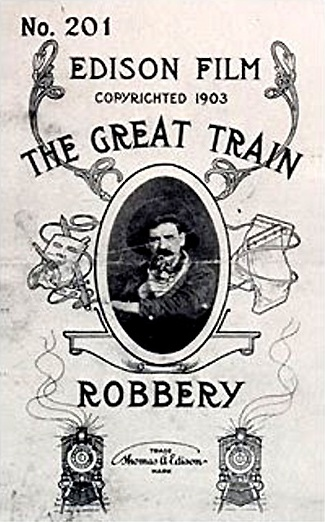
- Cover of a promotional leaflet for the film
- Directed by: Edwin S. Porter
- Written by: Edwin S. Porter
- Based on: The Great Train Robbery; 1896 play by Scott Marble
- Produced by: Edwin S. Porter
- Starring: Justus D. Barnes; G. M. Anderson; Walter Cameron
- Cinematography: Edwin S. Porter; J. Blair Smith
- Distributed by: Edison Manufacturing Company
- Release date: December 1903
- Running time: 740 ft (230 m); 12 minutes (at 18 frame/s)
- Country: United States
- Languages: Silent; English intertitles

The Great Train Robbery is a 1903 American silent Western action film made by Edwin S. Porter for the Edison Manufacturing Company. It follows a gang of outlaws who hold up and rob a steam train at a station in the American West, flee across mountainous terrain, and are finally defeated by a posse of locals. The short film draws on many sources, including a robust existing tradition of Western films, recent European innovations in film technique, the play of the same name by Scott Marble, the popularity of train-themed films, and possibly real-life incidents involving outlaws such as Butch Cassidy.

Porter supervised and photographed the film in New York and New Jersey in November 1903; the Edison studio began selling it to vaudeville houses and other venues in the following month. The cast included Justus D. Barnes and G. M. Anderson, who may have also helped with planning and staging. Porter's storytelling approach, though not particularly innovative or unusual for 1903, allowed him to include many popular techniques of the time, including scenes staged in wide shots, a matte effect, and an attempt to indicate simultaneous action across multiple scenes. Camera pans, location shooting, and moments of violent action helped give The Great Train Robbery a sense of rough-edged immediacy. A special close-up shot, which was unconnected to the story and could either begin or end the film depending on the projectionist's whim, showed Barnes, as the outlaw leader, firing his gun directly into the camera.

Due in part to its popular and accessible subject matter, as well as to its dynamic action and violence, The Great Train Robbery was an unprecedented commercial success. Though it did not significantly influence or advance the Western film genre upon release, it was widely distributed and copied, including in a parody by Porter himself. During the twentieth century, inaccurate legends about The Great Train Robbery developed, claiming it was the first Western or even the first film to include a plot. However, its commercial success and mythical status in film history nonetheless remain undisputed; the film has since become one of the greatest and most influential Westerns of all time, appearing in numerous film and television references and homages. In 1990, The Great Train Robbery was selected for preservation in the United States National Film Registry by the Library of Congress as being "culturally, historically, or aesthetically significant".

== Plot ==
Digital copy of print preserved at the Library of Congress; runtime 00:13:27.

Two bandits break into a railroad telegraph office, where they force the operator at gunpoint to stop a train and order its engineer to fill the locomotive's tender at the station's water tank. They then knock the operator out and tie him up. It is boarded by the bandits. Two bandits enter an express car and open a box of valuables with dynamite. The others kill the fireman and force the engineer to halt the train and disconnect its locomotive. The bandits then force the passengers off the train and rifle them for their belongings. One passenger tries to escape but is instantly shot down. The bandits escape in the locomotive.

The bound operator awakens but collapses again. His daughter arrives and she restores him to consciousness by dousing him with water. There is some comic relief at a dance hall, where an Eastern stranger is forced to dance while the locals fire at his feet. The door suddenly opens and the telegraph operator rushes in to tell them of the robbery. The men quickly form a posse and chase the bandits through the mountains. The posse finally overtakes the bandits and kills them all and recovers the stolen mail.

A standalone scene titled "Realism" presents a medium close-up of the leader of the outlaws, who fires his pistol point-blank directly into the camera.

The film's scenes, as numbered and titled in Edison's promotional leaflet
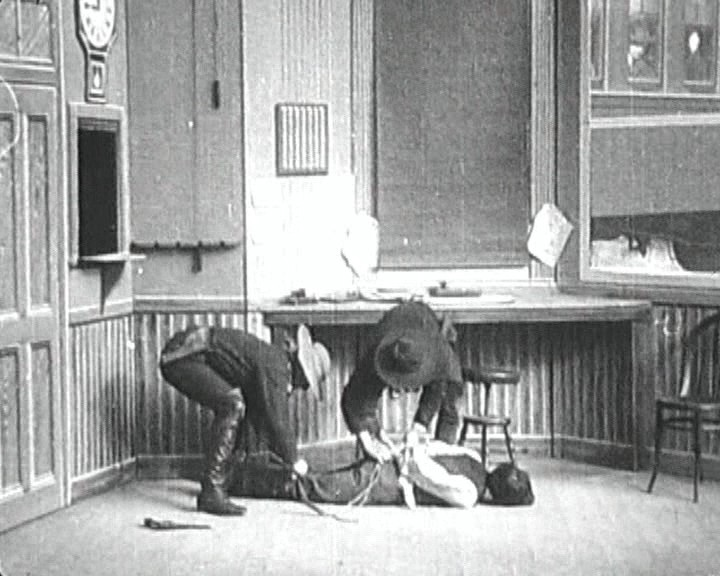
1. Interior of Railroad Telegraph Office

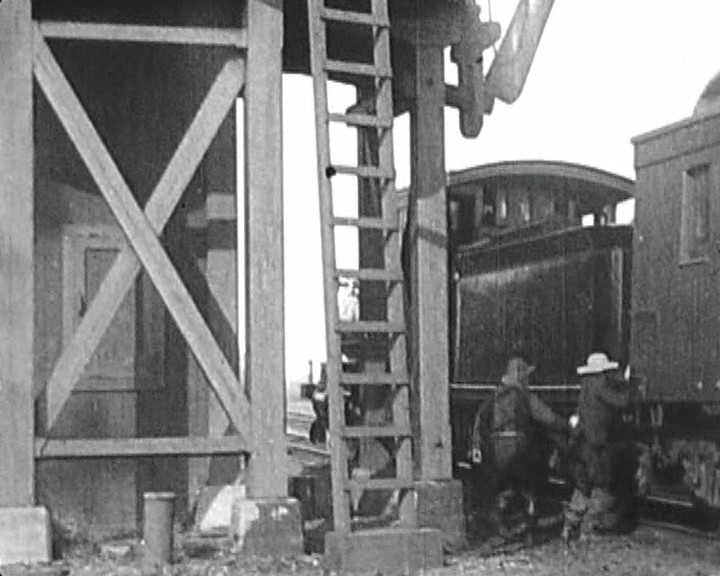
2. At the Railroad Water Tank

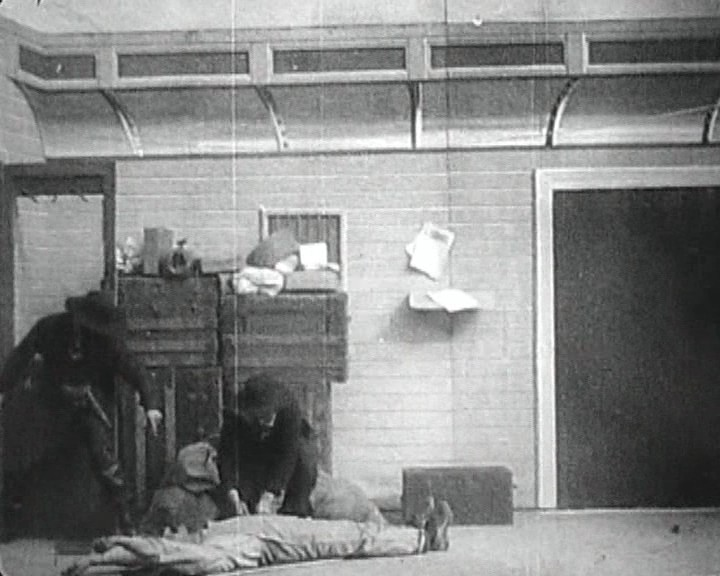
3. Interior of Express Car

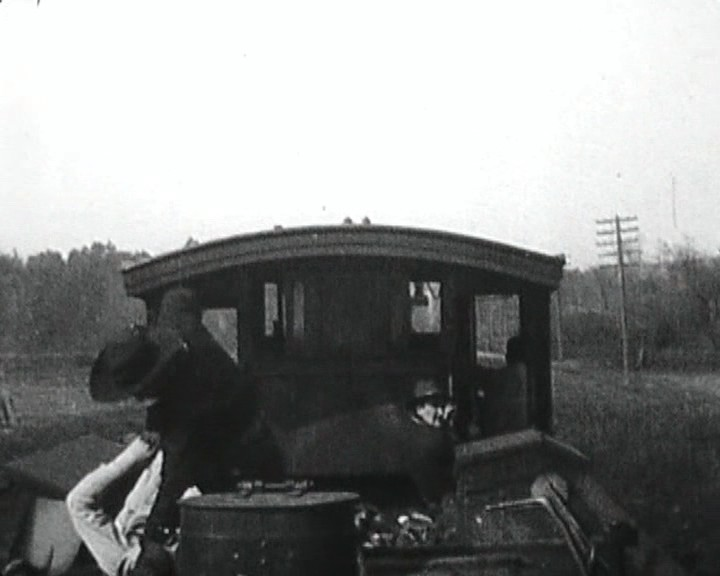
4. The Fight on the Tender

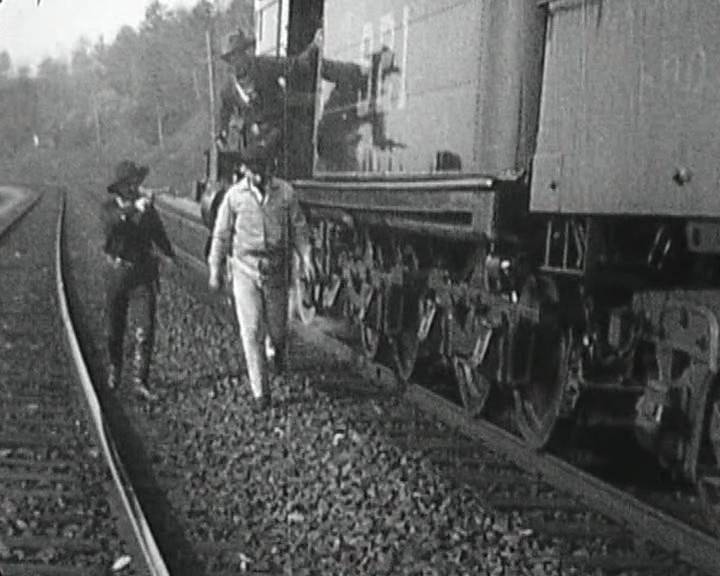
5. The Train Uncoupled

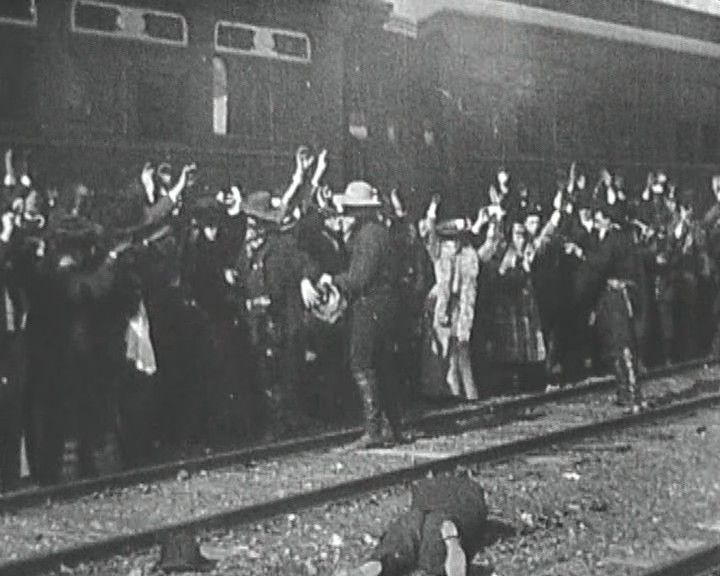
6. The Exterior of Passenger Coaches

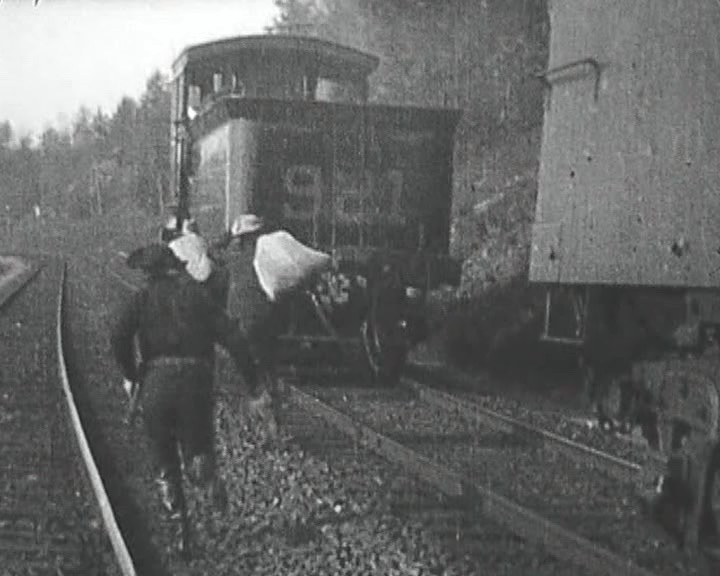
7. The Escape

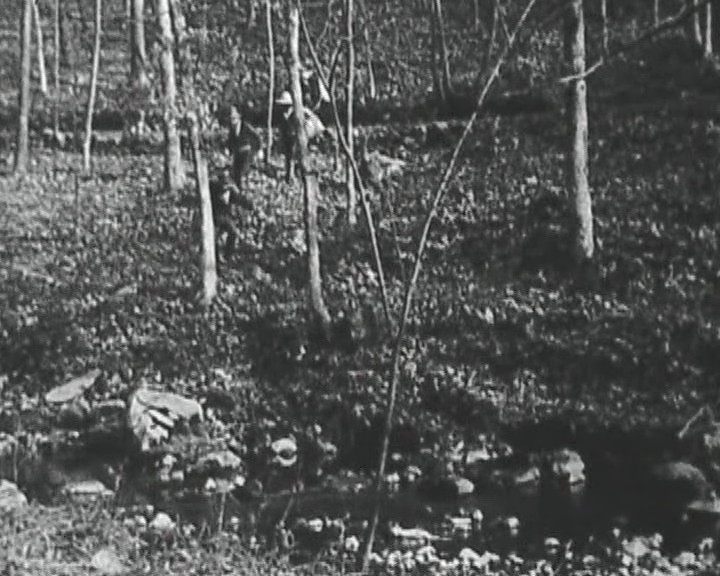
8. Off to the Mountains

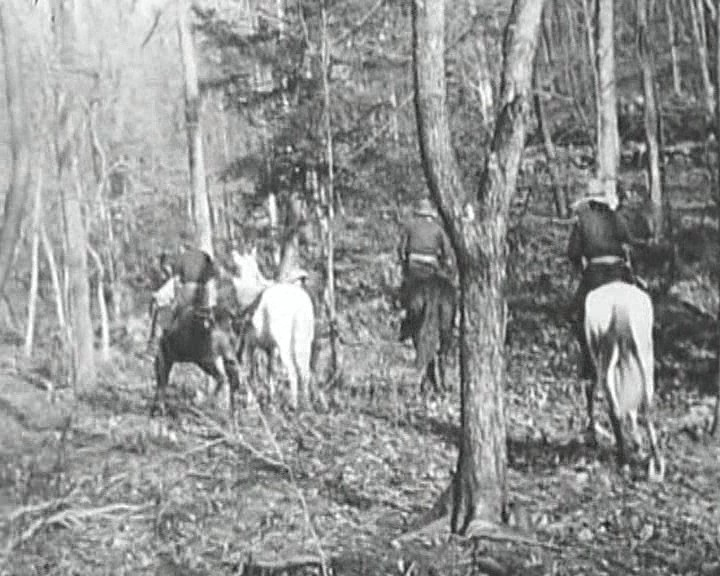
9. A Beautiful Scene in a Valley

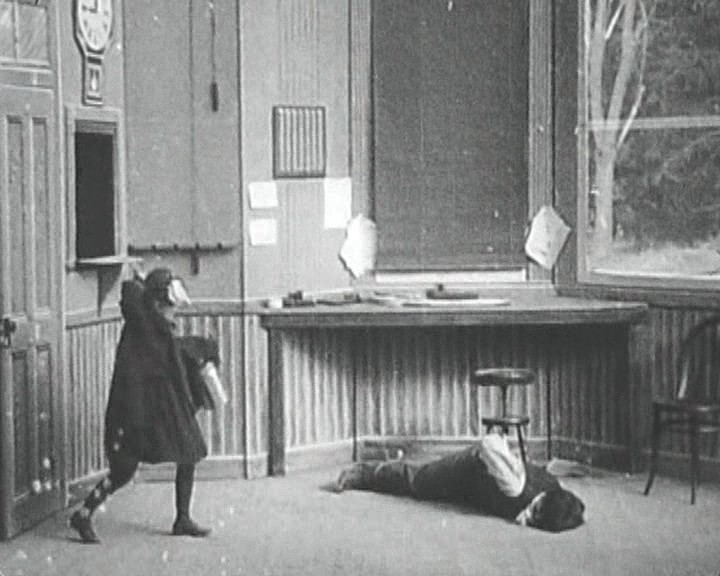
10. Interior of Telegraph Office

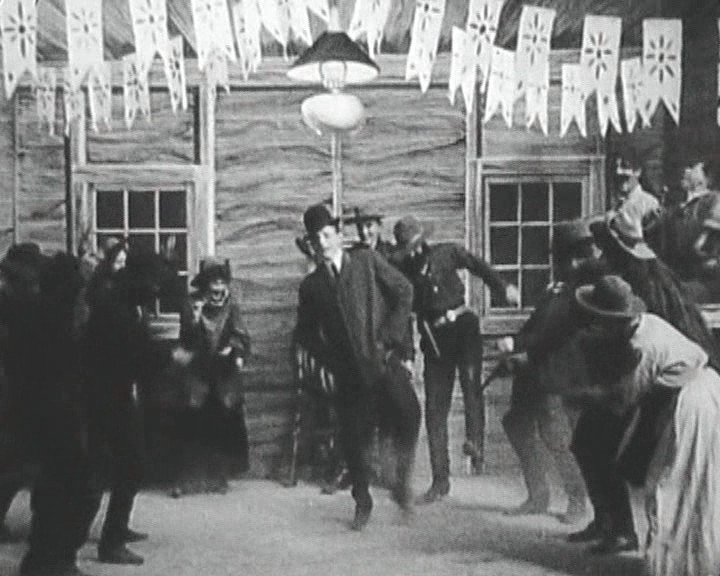
11. Interior of a Dance Hall

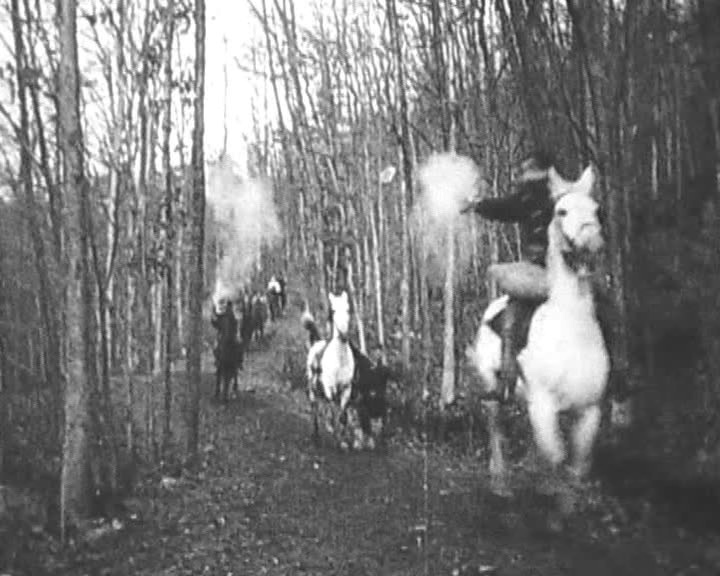
12. The Posse in Pursuit

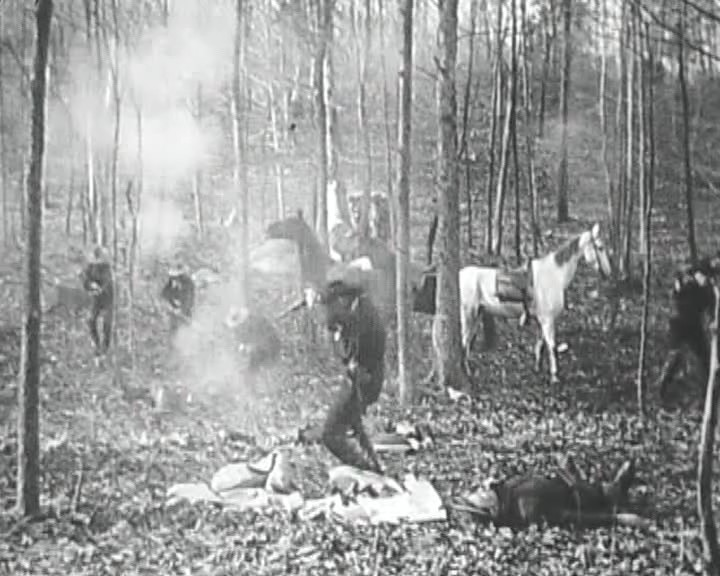
13. The Battle to the Death

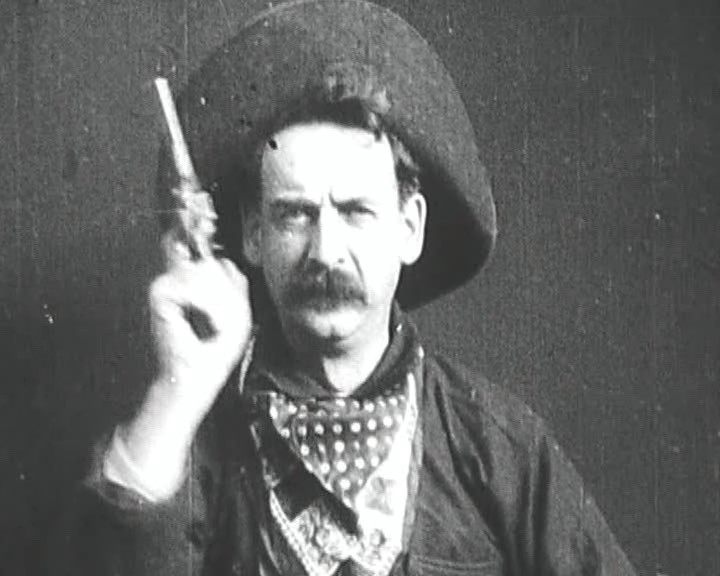
14. Realism

== Production ==
=== Background ===
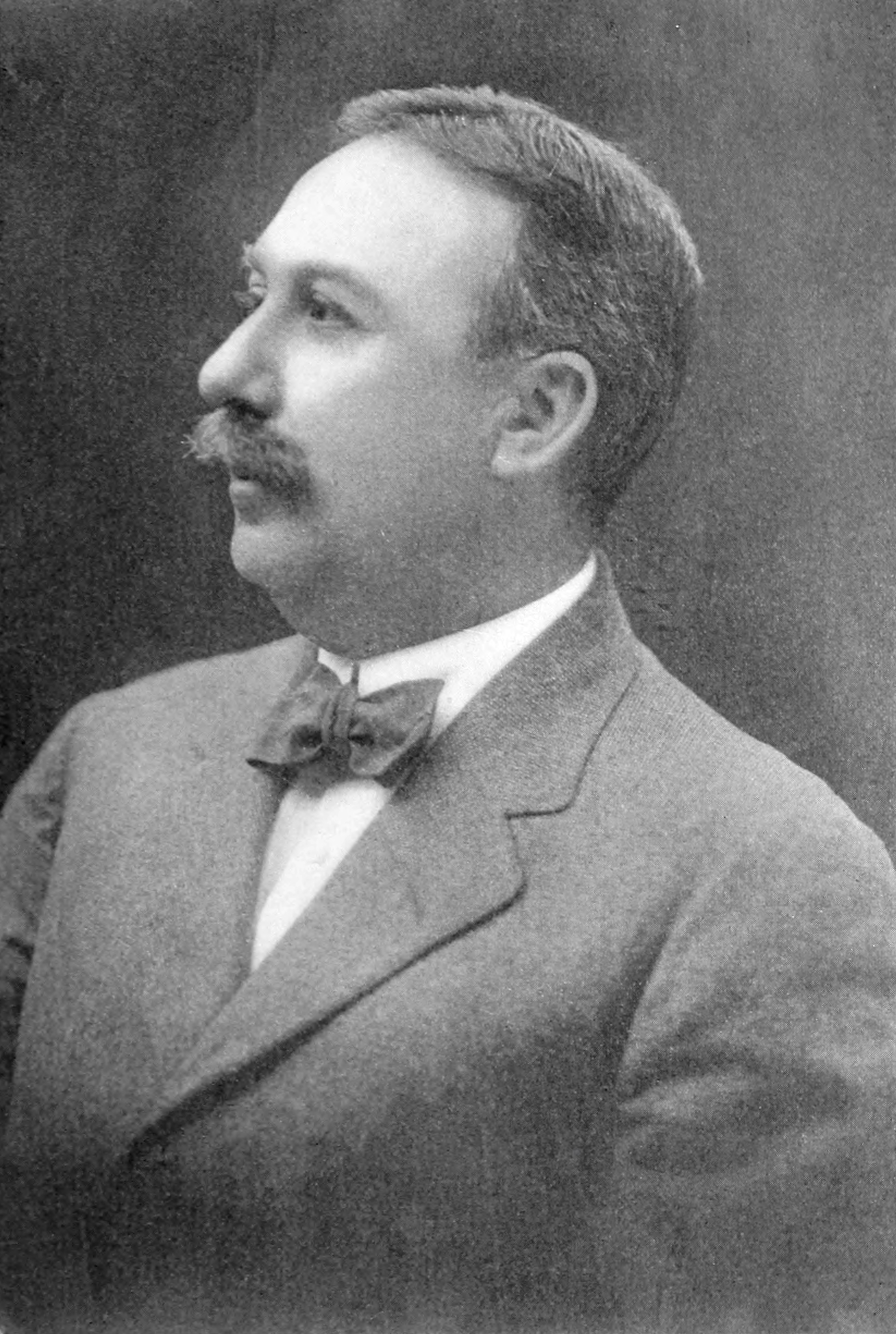
Edwin S. Porter in 1901

In the years leading up to The Great Train Robbery, the film industry was marked by much innovation and variety. Some studios, such as the Edison Manufacturing Company and the Lumière company, were best known for short sketches and actuality films presented in a straightforward style, often only a single shot long. However, other filmmakers aimed for more elaborate productions; Georges Méliès's films, such as the 1902 international success A Trip to the Moon, became acclaimed for their visual storytelling, often encompassing multiple scenes and involving careful editing and complicated special effects. Meanwhile, British filmmakers working in and around Brighton, a group later nicknamed the "Brighton School", made many innovations in narrative film grammar, developing framing and cutting conventions that would become industry standards.

Edwin S. Porter had won acclaim making cameras, film printers, and projectors; however, after his workshop was destroyed by a fire, he accepted a special commission for the Edison Manufacturing Company in 1901. His task to improve Edison's existing projecting equipment was a marked success, and Porter was given a regular job as the cameraman for Edison's New York film studio; at the time being a cameraman meant operating the camera as well as exercising creative control in a way that would later be called film directing. His early films were sketches and actualities in the simple style used by other Edison employees. However, his job also gave him the chance to view the many foreign films the Edison company were distributing and pirating, and around 1901 or 1902 he discovered the more complex works being made by Méliès and the Brighton School. Porter began attempts to bring Edison films to a similar level of achievement, later recalling, "From laboratory examination of some of the popular films of the French pioneer director, George Méliès—trick films like A Trip to the Moon—I came to the conclusion that a picture telling a story might draw the customers back to the theatres, and set to work in this direction."

The Edison studio, facing growing competition from other American companies, welcomed Porter's ambitious plans. His first major attempts at elaborate storytelling films included a 1902 adaptation of Jack and the Beanstalk in imitation of Méliès, and a 1903 Life of an American Fireman in the style of a notable Brighton School film, Fire! His films did well and were influential, bolstered by his status as the leading filmmaker at the most important American studio. In October 1903 Porter joined forces with a new Edison hire, Max Aronson, who was a young stage actor billed as G. M. Anderson. Anderson's initial jobs for the studio were inventing sight gags and playing occasional roles, but he was soon working with Porter on creative collaborations. Porter's next major film was The Great Train Robbery; Porter was in charge of production and photography, while Anderson may have assisted on staging.

=== Inspirations ===
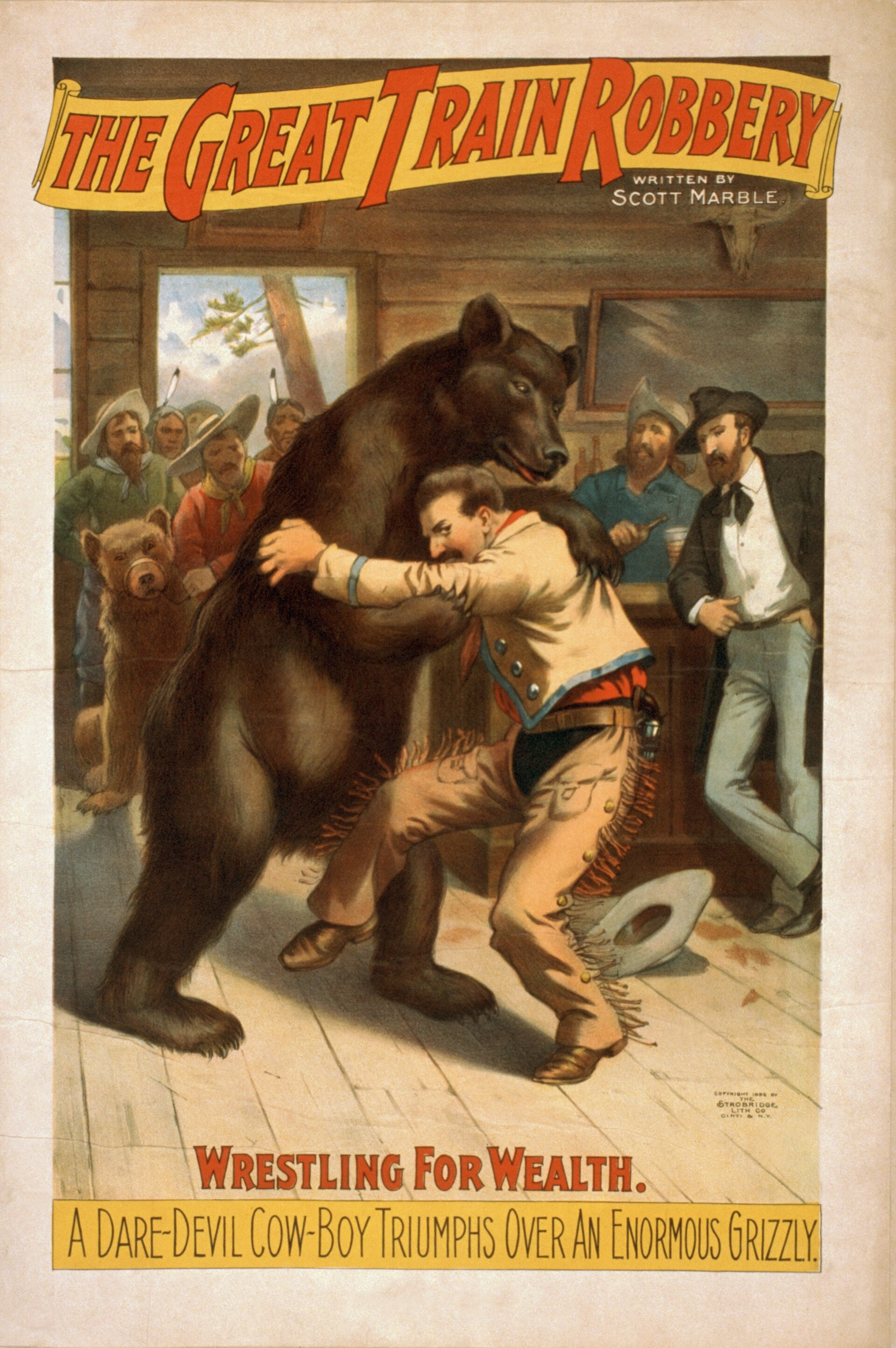
A poster for Scott Marble's 1896 play The Great Train Robbery

Porter (and possibly Anderson) drew on various sources when planning the scenario for The Great Train Robbery. Western themes were already popular in films and other entertainment, reflecting the wide public interest in stories about the past and present of the American West. Many American films before 1900 can be classified as Westerns, such as actuality views of cowboy life, staged Western anecdotes like A Bluff from a Tenderfoot and Cripple Creek Bar-Room Scene (both 1899), and shots of Annie Oakley and of Oglala and Brulé dancers from Buffalo Bill's Wild West Show (both 1894). Studios abroad also began telling Western stories early on, with Mitchell and Kenyon's 1899 British film Kidnapping by Indians the first known example. Edison's 1901 film Stage Coach Hold-up, based on Buffalo Bill's "Hold-up of the Deadwood Stage" act, probably influenced Porter directly. Porter may have also been inspired by recent real events related to the American West: in August 1900, Butch Cassidy and his gang had robbed a Union Pacific Railroad train and escaped capture, and in September 1903, Bill Miner's gang made an unsuccessful holdup of an Oregon Railroad and Navigation Company train.

For the film's title and basic concept, Porter looked to Scott Marble's The Great Train Robbery, a popular stage melodrama that had premiered in Chicago in 1896 and had been revived in New York in 1902. The play covers the adventures of a Texas criminal gang who attempt to steal a $50,000 gold shipment from a Wells Fargo office in Missouri. Their initial scheme is for a mole planted in the company to make off with the gold before it leaves Missouri by train; this plan goes awry, and only leads to an innocent man's arrest. However, using information received at a Texas mountain saloon, the gang are still able to stop the train, blast open the car containing the gold, and bring it back to their secret hideout in a Red River canyon. The United States Marshals Service tracks down the gang and finally defeats them in a climactic fight, with cowboys and Native Americans drawn into the fray.

For the narrative style, Porter likely drew freely on various recent popular films, made by filmmakers experimenting with elaborate storytelling. A Daring Daylight Burglary, a British chase drama from the Sheffield Photo Company, has frequently been cited as particularly influential; it and another British film, Desperate Poaching Affray, were successfully imported to the United States and started a decade-long vogue for films centered on chases. A Daring Daylight Burglary's story and editing appear to have supplied the overall narrative structure for The Great Train Robbery, though in the latter film the chase is only made explicit in one shot, the twelfth. Porter's plot also profited from the booming popularity of railroad-related film attractions, such as phantom rides and standalone comic scenes set on trains. The Great Train Robbery would treat the rail theme more elaborately than was common, showing its train from various angles and involving it in a dramatic adventure.

=== Filming ===
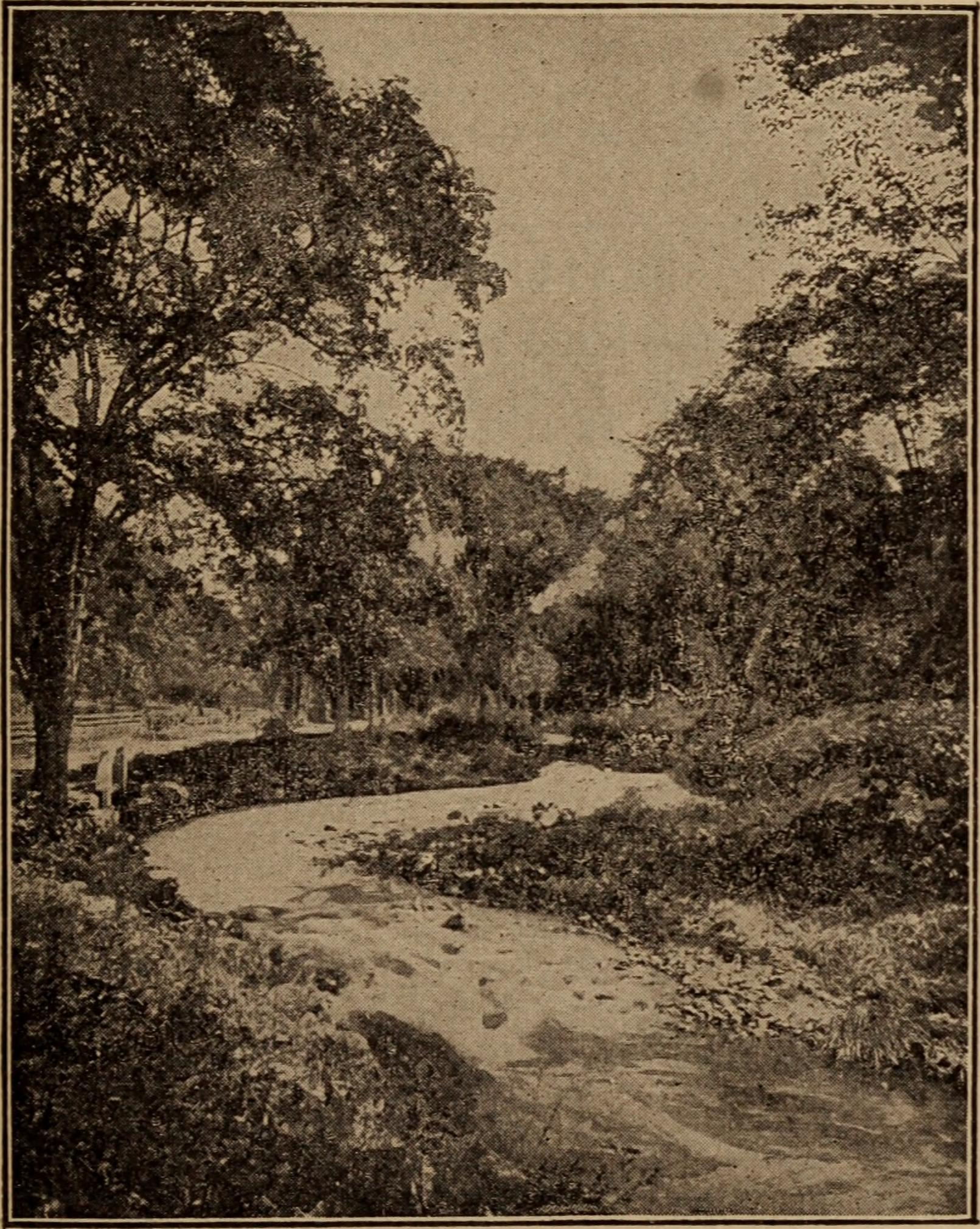
The South Mountain Reservation, one of Porter's locations

Porter filmed The Great Train Robbery in November 1903. Some scenes were photographed at the Edison studio in New York, and others were done in New Jersey, in Essex County Park and along the Delaware, Lackawanna and Western Railroad. The stream-crossing scene was filmed at Thistle Mill Ford in the South Mountain Reservation of Essex County Park. The cast included Justus D. Barnes as the leader of the outlaws, Walter Cameron as the sheriff and G. M. Anderson in three small roles (the murdered passenger, the dancing tenderfoot, and one of the robbers). Many Edison workers were among the extras. Edison filmmaker J. Blair Smith was one of the camera operators.

According to rumors in a contemporary New York Times piece on the film, the Edison Company initially attempted to get the railroad company to lend their tracks and cars for free, arguing that it would be good publicity for the line; the railroad directors disagreed, but eventually allowed their resources to be used if Edison also made a more straightforward advertising film for them. The article adds that a real fireman and engineer play those respective parts in the film, and that the filming caused some disturbance when the dummy thrown off the locomotive was mistaken by passersby for a real accident victim.

Porter's visual style for The Great Train Robbery was not cutting edge for 1903; it is comparable to numerous other films released around the same time, such as The Escaped Lunatic, a popular Biograph Studios comedy about wardens chasing an escapee from a mental institution, and Runaway Match, a British Gaumont film featuring an extended car chase sequence. Mary Jane's Mishap, a landmark dark comedy made by Brighton pioneers G. A. Smith and Laura Bayley and released months before The Great Train Robbery, is far more sophisticated in its editing and framing. Porter's style heavily prioritized action over character, with most figures remaining indistinguishable in wide shots; the staging inconsistently mixes stylized theatrical blocking with more naturalistic action. The film also leaves many narrative points ambiguous, requiring explanations to be filled in by a live narrator or by audience imaginations.

However, The Great Train Robbery successfully collected many popular themes and prevalent techniques of the time into a single accessible narrative. Porter cut his shots together to suggest action happening simultaneously in different locations, as he had done (albeit less efficiently) in Life of an American Fireman. The use of real outdoor locations and violent action helped keep the film dynamic, as did technical strategies such as a matte combining a studio scene with outdoor footage, and three shots in which the camera moves. These three shots add an edge of realism and immediacy, with the frame following the action as if recording real life in a documentary style; one of these shots, showing the robbers making off with their loot, even requires the mounted camera to attempt a tricky diagonal pan, creating a jagged effect.

The final shot, in which Barnes fires at the camera in a framing reminiscent of a wanted poster, is the film's only close-up, and does not function as part of the plot. Porter rarely used close-ups, especially in his later years, preferring to save them for special standalone effects like this one. Edison's promotional leaflet about the film describes this scene as follows:

Scene 14—REALISM. A life size picture of Barnes, leader of the outlaw band, taking aim and firing point blank at each individual in the audience. (This effect is gained by foreshortening in making the picture.) The resulting excitement is great. This section of the scene can be used either to begin the subject or to end it, as the operator may choose.

The catalogue's informal approach to where the scene should be placed was not unique to The Great Train Robbery; Porter's film Uncle Tom's Cabin, released earlier in 1903, had included a boat race scene that was variously advertised as Scene 5 (where it would make some narrative sense) or as Scene 10 (where it would not). Such shots, designed primarily for spectacle rather than for narrative coherency, characterize a popular early-film style later dubbed the "cinema of attractions".

== Release and reception ==
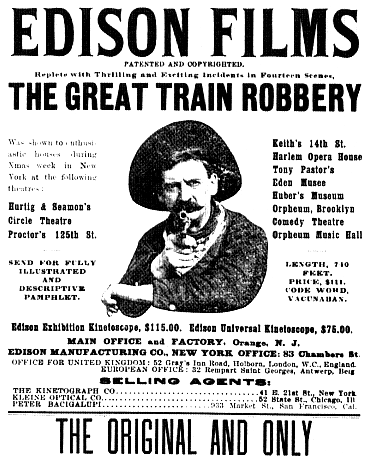
A newspaper advertisement for the film

In 1903, the most common American film venue was vaudeville houses, where films were exhibited as part of a varied bill of entertainment; other informal venues also sometimes showed films. The Edison Manufacturing Company announced The Great Train Robbery to exhibitors in early November 1903, calling it a "highly sensationalized Headliner". To secure copyright, they submitted a rough cut of the film (about fifteen feet longer than the final cut) to the Library of Congress, where it survives as a paper print. The final release print was made available in early December 1903. Edison sold it to exhibitors for US$111, as a 740-foot reel. The first known showing of The Great Train Robbery was at a New York City dime museum, Huber's Museum. By the following week it was appearing at eleven venues in the city area, including the Eden Musée, a major amusement center. Edison advertisements touted the film as "absolutely the superior of any moving picture ever made" and a "faithful imitation of the genuine 'Hold Ups' made famous by various outlaw bands in the far West". A number of prints of The Great Train Robbery survive; a few of these were heavily edited and altered by their owners, but most are in their release state, and at least one is hand-colored.

The Great Train Robbery was a major commercial success for the Edison company. It played as the headlining attraction in many vaudeville houses, and showed up frequently at two other entertainment venues that proliferated across the country in the following years: immersive venues where the spectator took simulated railroad journeys, such as Hale's Tours of the World, and a new kind of film venue, the nickelodeon, where The Great Train Robbery was often the first attraction shown. It was the first film shown at Harry Davis and John P. Harris' Nickelodeon theater. Overall, it may have had the biggest success of any film made before 1905. Its popularity was helped by its timely subject matter (as train robberies were still a familiar news item), as well as its striking depictions of action and violence. Unusually for the time, the film was even described in detail in The New York Times; the anonymous reviewer criticized most of the players, but praised the horse riding and stunts, concluding: "All this is the result of poor acting, but the results are certainly astounding."

The film was also widely imitated and copied; the Lubin Manufacturing Company made a shot-for-shot remake in August 1904, changing only small details. (Film copyright was legally murky until 1912, so despite the film's Library of Congress registration, unauthorized remakes and adaptations could be made with impunity.) Porter himself directed a 1905 parody of the film, The Little Train Robbery, with children robbing candy and dolls from a miniature railroad car. But despite its wide success and imitators, The Great Train Robbery did not lead to a significant increase in Western films; instead, the genre continued essentially as it had before, in a scattered mix of short actualities and longer stories. The Western genre would not proliferate in earnest until 1908; one of the leading contributors to this boom was G. M. Anderson, now billed as Broncho Billy Anderson. Porter continued to make films for more than a decade after, usually in a similar editing style to The Great Train Robbery, with few additional technical innovations. One historian commented that later efforts like The Count of Monte Cristo (1913) were "if anything a retrogression from The Great Train Robbery and had less innate cinema sense." However, some of Porter's post-Robbery works continued to be imaginative in content, including The Kleptomaniac, a notable 1905 social justice film.

== Legacy ==
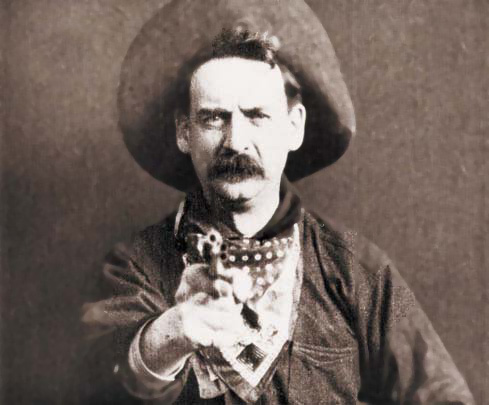
The film's iconic image of Justus D. Barnes firing at the camera, in a sepia-toned print still

In the decades after The Great Train Robbery, various inaccurate legends developed, exaggerating its historical significance. By mid-century, mistaken claims that it was the "first Western" or even the "first story film" were common. Critiquing these inaccurate legends and citing the film's actual lack of impact on the Western genre, historian Scott Simmon comments that in fact the film's "main surprise in retrospect is how it led nowhere, either for its creator or the genre, beyond serving loosely as a narrative model for gun-wielding crime and horse-chase retribution." Claims about historical priority continued to be repeated by general-audience writers into the early twenty-first century.

Later film critics, abandoning the exaggerated claims, have tended to explain the film's significance mostly in terms of its wide popularity and Porter's influential action-driven storytelling. William Everson and George Fenin dubbed it "the first dramatically creative American film", while Robert Sklar praised the film's capacity "to unite motion picture spectacle with myth and stories about the United States that were shared by people throughout the world." Historians have cited The Great Train Robbery as Porter's most important film, and noted it as a popular early film that collects numerous important Western tropes, such as "elements of fisticuffs, horseback pursuit and gunplay". Film historian Pamela Hutchinson highlights especially the iconic close-up scene, "a jolt of terror as disconcerting as a hand bursting from a grave":

It's an especially violent act, both in real terms, and cinematic ones. The narrative momentum of the film is cast aside, then the fourth wall of the screen is broken by his gaze, only to be further ruptured by his bullets. Placed at the opening of the film, it might act as a trailer for the shoot-'em-up action to come. As a coda, it's a warning to the audience that it's a wild world out there, and the violence continues even after the train robber case has been closed.

The Great Train Robbery was added to the United States National Film Registry in 1990. In popular culture, numerous films and television shows have referenced the film and the iconic Barnes close-up:

- Historian James Chapman compares the James Bond gun barrel sequences, conceived by Maurice Binder, to the close-up.
- The Batman episode "The Riddler's False Notion" (1966) guest-stars silent film icon Francis X. Bushman as a film collector who owns a print of The Great Train Robbery.
- The German ZDF series Western von gestern (1978–1986) uses the Barnes close-up for its opening and closing sequences.
- The final scene of Martin Scorsese's Goodfellas (1990), in which Tommy DeVito (portrayed by Joe Pesci) shoots at the camera, recreates the close-up as a homage. Scorsese has commented that the shot is "...a reference to the end of The Great Train Robbery ...And the plot of this picture is very similar to The Great Train Robbery."
- The supernatural thriller television series Evil (2019) has an image of the iconic Barnes close up in the opening credits at the half-point between 18:20 and 18:21. The credits of the same episode feature a trigger warning with the words "subliminal glimpses of sex and violence" with show creators previously having referenced unexpected violent imagery as a necessary component in the series’ model.

== See also ==
- Edwin S. Porter filmography

== Works cited ==
- Anonymous (March 13, 1904), "'The Great Train Robbery,' as Rehearsed in New Jersey", The New York Times, p. SM3
- Anonymous (October 31, 2019), "World's first Western movie 'filmed in Blackburn'", BBC News, British Broadcasting Corporation
- Barnes, John (2004), "Mary Jane's Mishap: An Early British Film Re-examined", Film History, 16 (1): 54–59, doi:10.2979/FIL.2004.16.1.54, JSTOR 3815559
- Chapman, James (2000), Licence to Thrill: A Cultural History of the James Bond Films, New York: Columbia University Press, ISBN 0-231-12048-6
- Cook, David A. (1981), A History of Narrative Film, New York: W. W. Norton & Company, ISBN 0393013707
- Cousins, Mark (2002), Scene by Scene: Film Actors and Directors Discuss Their Work, London: Laurence King, ISBN 9781856692878
- Eisner, Joel; Krinsky, David (1984), Television Comedy Series: An Episode Guide To 153 TV Sitcoms In Syndication, Jefferson, NC: McFarland, ISBN 0-899-50088-9
- Everson, William K. (1969), A Pictorial History of the Western Film, Secaucus, NJ: Citadel Press
- Evina, Frank (October 2004), "Copyright Lore" (PDF), Copyright.gov, United States Copyright Office
- Gamarekian, Barbara (October 19, 1990), "Library of Congress Adds 25 Titles to National Film Registry", The New York Times
- Hutchinson, Pamela (February 2016), "Endings...: The Great Train Robbery", Sight & Sound, British Film Institute, p. 112
- King, Robert (August 15, 2024). "Fear of the Unholy". Evil(2019). CBS.
- Kozak, Lynn (2022), "Keeping Up with the Kings", The Velvet Light Trap, 90, Austin: University of Texas Press: 51–60, doi:10.7560/VLT9006, ISSN 0149-1830, archived from the original on September 25, 2024
- Lusted, David (2014), The Western, London: Routledge, ISBN 9781317874911
- Musser, Charles (1990), The Emergence of Cinema: The American Screen to 1907, New York: Charles Scribner's Sons
- Musser, Charles (1991), Before the Nickelodeon: Edwin S. Porter and the Edison Manufacturing Company, Berkeley: University of California Press
- Pratt, George C. (1973), Spellbound in Darkness: A History of the Silent Film, Greenwich, CT: New York Graphic Society
- Seiler, Robert (2013). Reel Time: Movie Exhibitors and Movie Audiences In Prairie Canada, 1896 to 1986. Athabasca University Press. ISBN 9781926836997.
- Simmon, Scott (2009), The Invention of the Western Film: A Cultural History of the Genre's First Half-Century, Cambridge: Cambridge University Press
- Sippell, Margeaux (September 26, 2019), "'Evil' Creators Robert and Michelle King on 30 Years of Debating the Nature of Evil", TheWrap, The Wrap News Inc.
- Slide, Anthony (1994), Early American Cinema (rev. ed.), Metuchen, NJ: Scarecrow Press, p. 17, ISBN 9780810827226
- Smith, Michael Glover; Selzer, Adam (2015), Flickering Empire: How Chicago Invented the U.S. Film Industry, Columbia University Press, ISBN 978-0-231-85079-7
- Thompson, Kristin; Bordwell, David (1994), Film History: An Introduction, New York: McGraw-Hill
- ZDF (1978), Western von gestern, ZDF, opening and closing
