= John C. Rice =

American actor

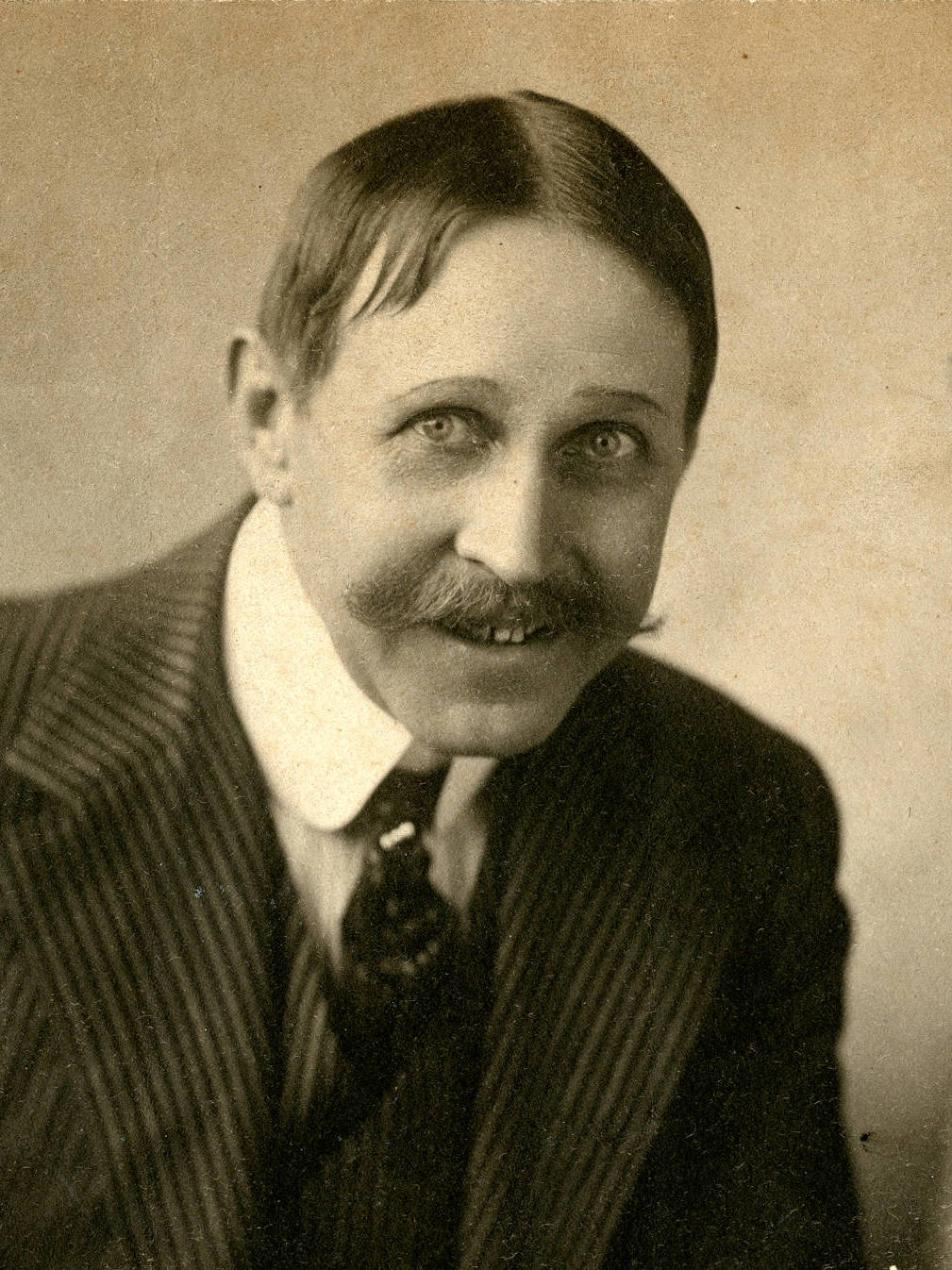
- Rice c. 1890s
- Born: John C. Hilberg; April 7, 1857; Beaverkill, New York, U.S.
- Died: June 5, 1915 (aged 58); Philadelphia, Pennsylvania, U.S.
- Occupations: Stage, film actor
- Known for: The Kiss
- Parent(s): John Marcus Hilberg, Frances Hilberg

John C. Rice (né Hilberg; April 7, 1857 – June 5, 1915) was an American born Broadway stage actor and vaudevillian who is credited with performing the first onscreen kiss with May Irwin in 1896 for the Thomas Edison film company film The Kiss. The film was a 47-second recreation of a scene from the Broadway play The Widow Jones starring Irwin and Rice.

== Life and career ==
The son of John Marcus Hilberg and Frances Hilberg (née Grant), John C. Hilberg was born on April 7, 1857 in Beaverkill, New York; a small community in Sullivan County that is northwest of the town of Rockland, New York. His parents were farmers and first generation Americans who had immigrated to the United States from Sweden. At the age of 17 he ran away from home to pursue a career on the stage. He adopted the stage name John C. Rice at this point.

Rice began his career on the stage as a contortionist in vaudeville; ultimately branching out into work as a comic actor. While working in Philadelphia, he met fellow actor George W. Munroe. Rice and Munroe were both supporting actors in the play Over the Garden Wall; a work staged by the George S. Knight theatre company which premiered at the Chestnut Street Opera House (built 1870 as Fox's American Theatre) on September 1, 1884. Munroe was particularly successful in the comic female impersonation character of the Irish woman Bridget. The production then toured and ultimately was performed at Broadway's Union Square Theatre in January 1885, later transferring to the Fifth Avenue Theatre the following March.

Rice and Munroe formed a long lasting performance partnership after the close of this play. The playwright Scott Marble wrote a new play centered around Munroe's Bridget character, My Aunt Bridget, which began its life on the stage in 1886 in Kansas City, Missouri. The play starred the Rice and Munroe team and the pair spent the remainder of the decade touring the United States in vaudeville in this work. In January 1891 a second play featuring the Bridget character and the Rice and Munroe team premiered at Boston's Park Theatre, Aunt Bridget's Baby. The actor Andrew Mack became part of the Munroe and Rice team, and they continued to perform plays led by Munroe as Bridget through 1898; marking a 12-year-long span for the Munroe and Rice vaudeville team.

In 1890 Rice married the actress Sally Cohen. On November 27, 1890 the couple's daughter, Gladys Rice, was born. She later had a career on stage and on record as a soprano. After his partnership with Munroe ended, Rice and his wife starred opposite one another in the popular sketch comedy "Our Honeymoon" at Keith's Theatre in Boston in 1898. The pair continued to perform in vaudeville theatres together as the comedy duo Rice and Cohen for more than fifteen years. In 1907, they performed the skit "A Bachelor's Wife" at Chase's in Washington, D. C. Their final performances together occurred just two months before Rice's death at Broadway's Colonial Theatre in April 1915.

Rice's Broadway credits included Vivian's Papas (1903), Are You a Mason? (1901), Courted Into Court (1897), and The Widow Jones (1895).

John C. Rice died of Bright's disease on June 5, 1915 in Philadelphia, Pennsylvania.

== Filmography ==
Year	Title	Role	Notes
1896	The Kiss	Billie Bikes	Short
1900	The Kleptomaniacs	—N/a	Short
1936	Fashions in Love	—N/a	Short, archive footage, posthumously release
