= Fritz Williams =

American actor (1865–1930)

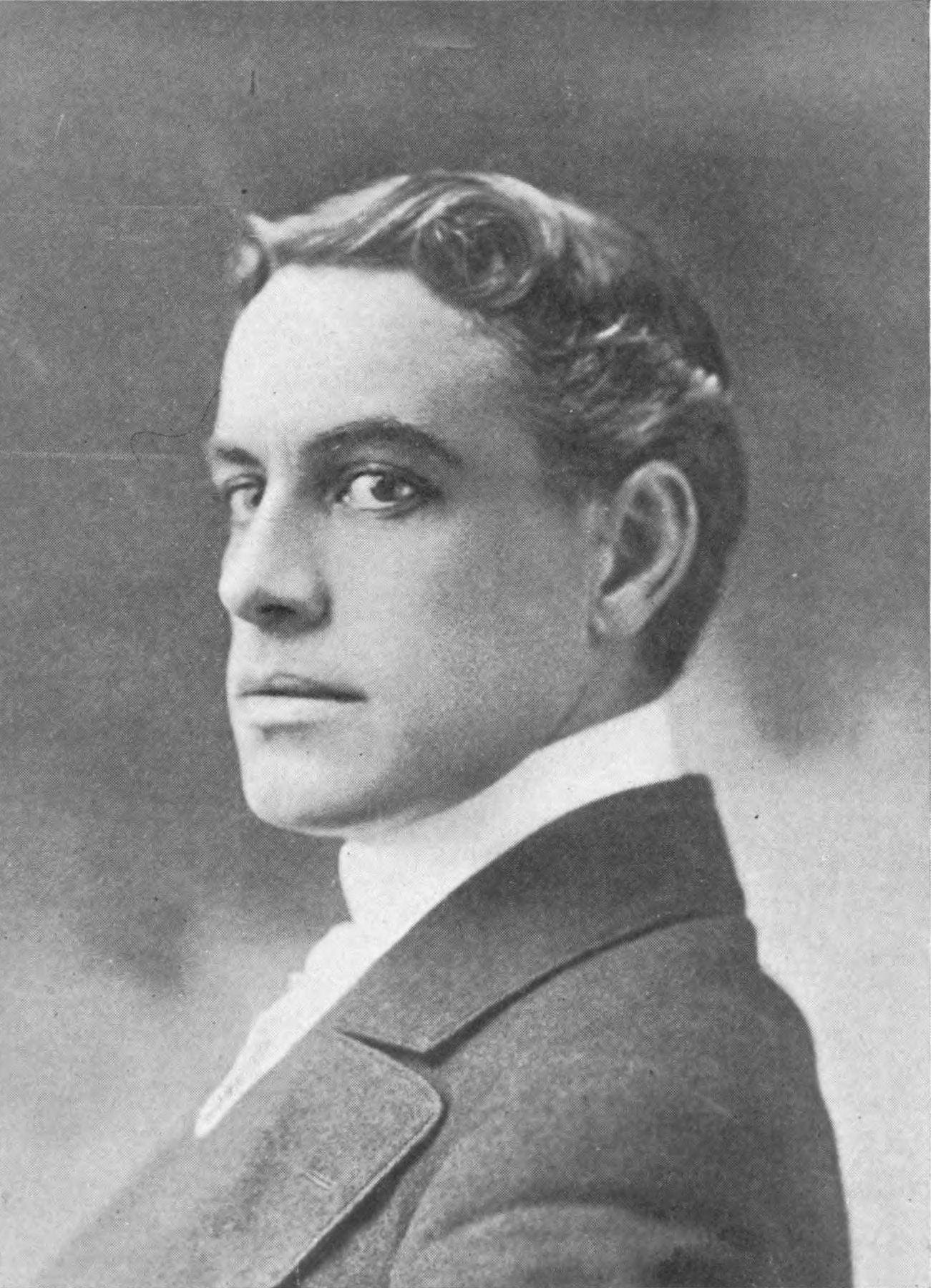
- Fritz Williams c. 1901

Shepherd of The Lambs
- In office 1928–1930
- Preceded by: Thomas A. Wise
- Succeeded by: Frank Crumit

Personal details
- Born: August 23, 1865 Boston, Massachusetts
- Died: April 1, 1930 (aged 64) Manhattan, New York City
- Resting place: Woodlawn Cemetery, The Bronx
- Spouse: Katherine Florence
- Parent: Fred Williams (father)
- Occupation: actor, comedian

Frederick (Fritz) Williams, Jr. (August 23, 1865 – April 1, 1930) was an American actor and Shepherd (president) of The Lambs from 1928 to 1930.

He made his stage debut when he was six months old. William Warren carried him onstage at the Boston Museum in Seeing Warren. Williams made his professional debut in 1879 in Gilbert and Sullivan's musical H.M.S. Pinafore. His New York debut was at Wallack's Theatre in 1884 in A Scrap of Paper.

He started his regular acting career at the old Lyceum Theatre on Park Avenue South with Helen Dauvray in One of Our Girls in a small dramatic part. This caught the eye of fellow Lambs member Dion Boucicault, who went on to engage Williams for the next three years.

Williams worked steadily in New York playhouses from 1884 to 1930.

Williams died on April 1, 1930, in The Lambs clubhouse in Manhattan, New York. He and his wife, Katherine Florence, are interred in the Lakeside Section of Woodlawn Cemetery, The Bronx.

== Selected stage performances ==
- An American Duchess (1893)
- On and Off (1898)
- Fiddle-dee-dee (1900–1901)
- Hoity Toity (1901–1902)
- Before and After (1905–1906)
- The Summer Widowers (1910)
- The King (1917–1918)
- Too Many Husbands (1919–1920)
- Rain (1924)
- Spread Eagle (1927)
- Before You're 25 (1929)
- Berkeley Square (1929–1930)
