= Western von gestern =

- Country of origin: West Germany

Original release
- Network: ZDF
- Release: May 1978 – July 1986

Western von gestern (lit.: "Yesterday's Western") was a West German movie showcase series that aired on the ZDF network from May 1978 to July 1986.

== Concept ==
Western von gestern was the collective showcase title for a number of American black-and-white Western films and serials from the 1930s to the 1950s. The adaptation script was written by Joe Hembus and Eydo von Hadeln, and the music (which featured original soundtracks, rather than using the originals' musical scores) was composed by Fred Strittmatter and Quirin Amper Jr..

The featured list includes Zorro's Black Whip and several early films with John Wayne, Al St. John (in his popular role as "Fuzzy Jones"), Buster Crabbe and Roy Rogers (Days of Jesse James). However, to accommodate the German TV format, many of the films and serials were edited from their usual 60-minute down to 25-minute features or divided into episodes of similar length. A total of 155 episodes were aired.

One of the show's particularly striking features was the use of Justus D. Barnes' iconic shooting scene from the silent film western The Great Train Robbery - with additionally inserted sound effects - for its intro and final credit sequences.

== See also ==
- List of German television series
