= George W. Munroe =

American actor and comedian (1857–1932)

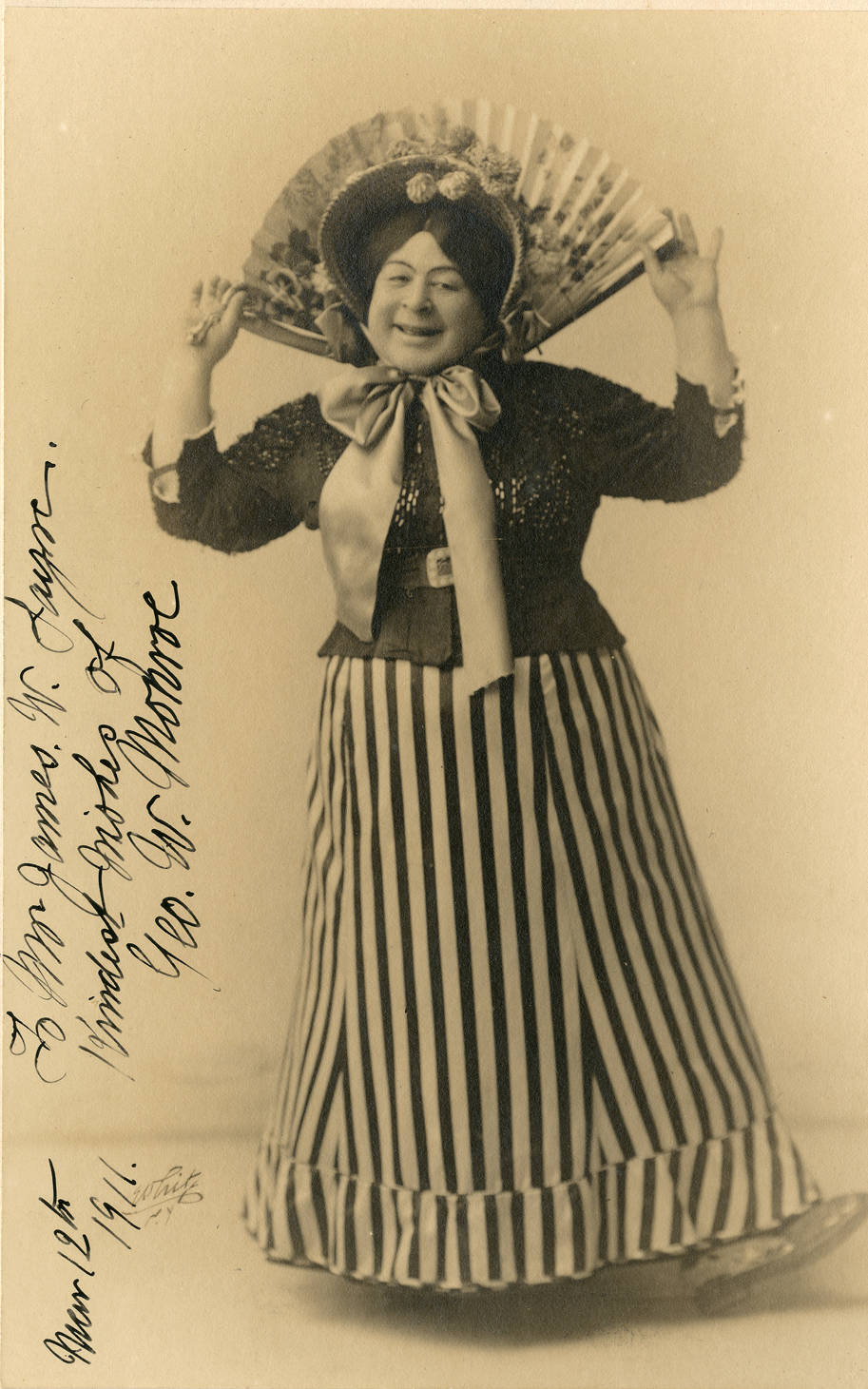
Munroe (1911)

George W. Munroe (1857 – January 29, 1932) was an American actor and comedian who specialized in female impersonation. He was actively performing in American theaters from the 1880s into the early 1920s. He performed in both Broadway shows and in vaudeville. He was best known for his comic portrayals of gossipy old Irish women.

== Early life and career ==
George W. Munroe was born in Philadelphia and began his career in that city as a member of the Wheatley Dramatic Association. He joined the touring theater company of actor George S. Knight (1850–1892), making his debut as Bridget, an Irish woman, in Over the Garden Wall at the Chestnut Street Opera House (built 1870 as Fox's American Theatre) on September 1, 1884. The production then went on tour eventually arriving at Broadway's Union Square Theatre in January 1885. Munroe was still in the cast when it moved to the Fifth Avenue Theatre in March 1885.

In placing Munroe's career within the context of the broader history of drag during the 19th century, Laurence Senelick, writing in The Cambridge Guide to American Theatre, stated that

Puritans had attacked as 'sodomitical' the Elizabethan convention of boys playing girls, and it disappeared with the Restoration; but the accompanying tradition of the "dame" role – an elderly woman impersonated by a male comedian – survived on the American stage, carried on by Neil Burgess as the Widow Bedotte, George W. Munroe as various Irish biddies, Gilbert Sarony as Giddy Gusher, and the Russell Brothers as clumsy Irish maids.

Munroe developed a partnership with comedian and fellow Philadelphian John C. Rice; an actor who had also had a comic role in Over the Garden Wall. They capitalized on the success of Munroe's Irish female character from that play, and repurposed it into a new play written by Scott Marble entitled My Aunt Bridget with Munroe as the title character. It premiered in Kansas City, Missouri, in 1886. Munroe and Rice toured this play throughout the United States in vaudeville theaters in the latter half of the 1880s. A second play followed this work, Aunt Bridget's Baby, which debuted at the Park Theatre in Boston in January 1891. The actor Andrew Mack became part of the Munroe and Rice team, and they continued to perform plays led by Munroe as Bridget through 1898; marking a 12-year-long span for the Munroe and Rice vaudeville team.

== Later career as a Broadway star and death ==
In the first two decades of the twentieth century Munroe starred in several Broadway musicals. His roles on the New York stage included the title role in The Doings of Mrs. Dooley at the Grand Opera House in 1902; Aurora Borealis in Anne Caldwell's The Top o' th' World at the Majestic Theatre in 1907–1908; Miss Tiny Daley in The Mimic World of 1908; Pansy Burns in Raymond Hubbell and Glen MacDonough's The Midnight Sons (1909, Broadway Theatre); Patricia Flynn in A. Baldwin Sloane's The Never Homes (1911, Broadway Theatre); and Mrs. Honoria O'Day in Lew Fields' production of The Sun Dodgers (1912, Broadway Theatre).

Munroe also starred in the musical revue The Passing Show in 1914 and 1915. He performed regularly in both Broadway and regional theaters owned by the Shubert family from 1911 until his retirement from the stage in 1922.

Munroe died at Atlantic Shores Hospital in Somers Point, New Jersey, on January 29, 1932. He was survived by his wife, the actress Anna Sedgewick.
