= The Music Master (play) =

Play by Charles Klein

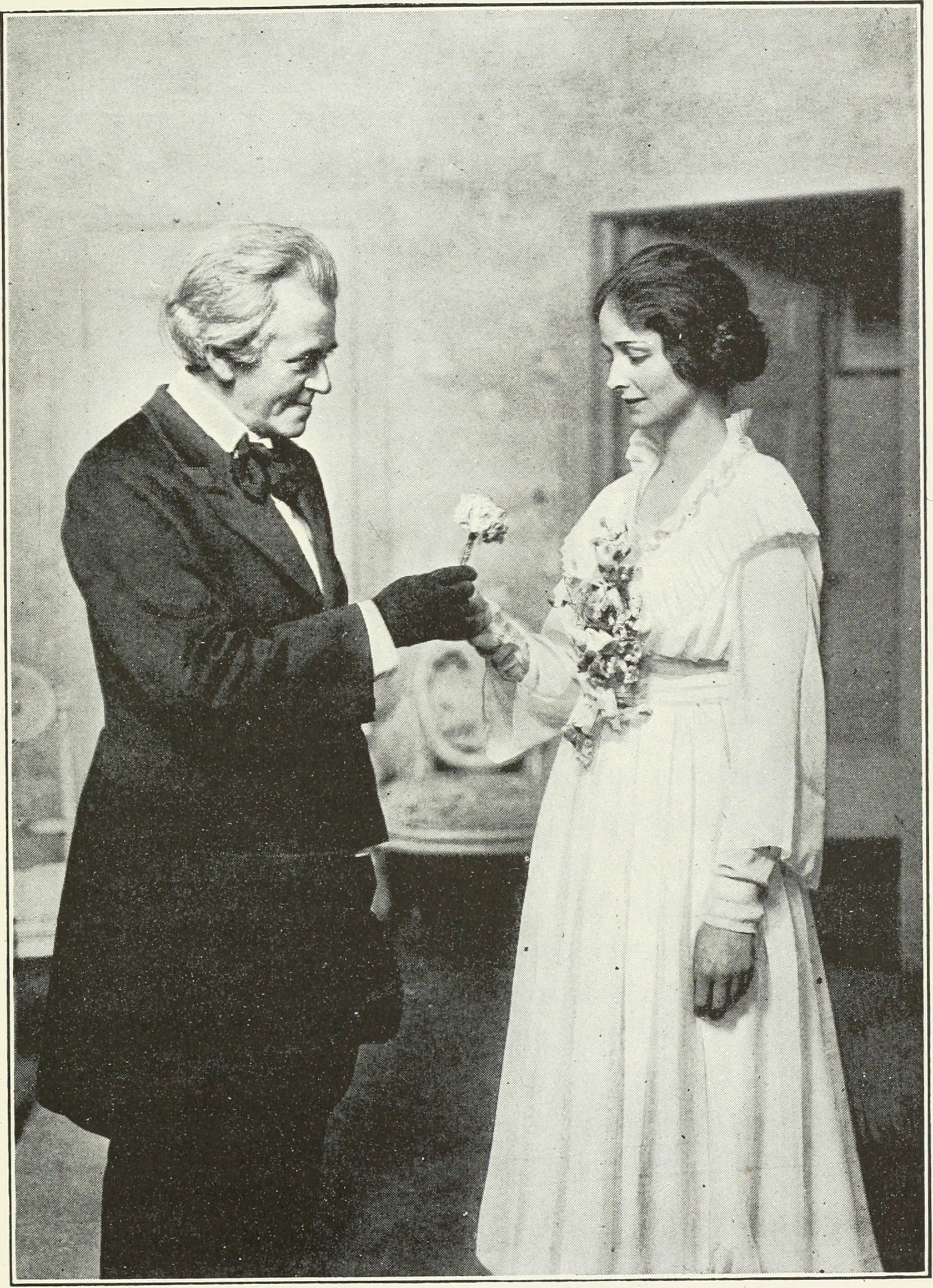
- David Warfield in The Music Master
- Written by: Charles Klein

Premiere
- Date: September 26, 1904
- Place: Belasco Theatre
- Directed by: David Belasco

The Music Master was a theatrical play written by Charles Klein, and produced and directed by David Belasco.

== Background ==
The three-act comedy-drama opened at the Belasco Theatre in New York on September 26, 1904. It ran for 124 performances before it was moved to the Bijou Theatre where it ran for another 511 performances over that and the next two seasons (taking summers off), before going on tour. David Warfield originated the title role, Anton Von Barwig, and continued playing it in revivals and on tour for two decades. William Furst composed the play's incidental music. It was adapted into the film The Music Master.

== Bibliography ==
- Mantle, Burns and Garrison P. Sherwood, eds., The Best Plays of 1899-1909, Philadelphia, The Blakiston Company, 1947.
- The Music Master clipping/theatrical program folder held by the Billy Rose Theatre Division, New York Public Library for the Performing Arts.
