= The Widow Jones =

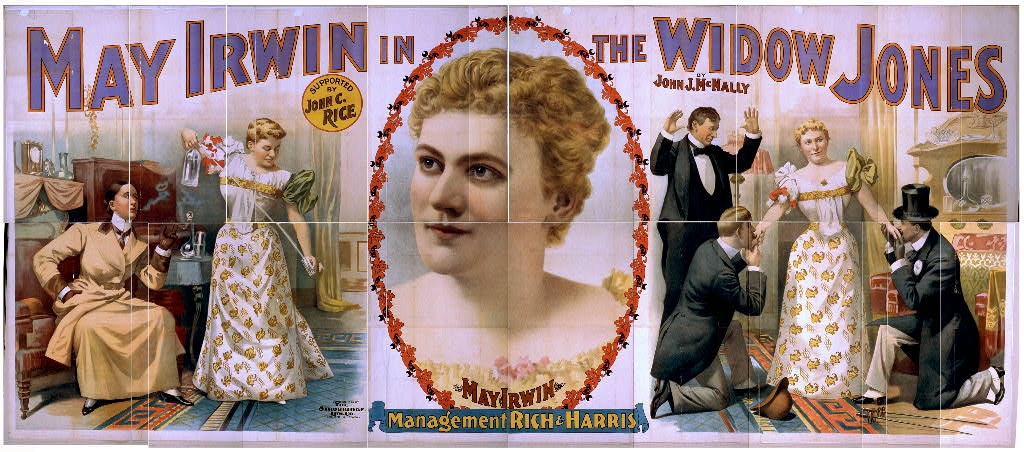
- Music: Various
- Lyrics: Various
- Book: John J. McNally
- Productions: 1895 Broadway; 1901 Broadway

The Widow Jones is a musical comedy created by the writer John J. McNally as a star vehicle for the actress and singer May Irwin. The musical used song material in "Negro dialect" by a variety of songwriters. Premiering at the Boston Museum theatre and backed by the Boston producers Rich & Harris, the play toured in cities through the United States in 1895-1896; including two separate runs at Broadway's Bijou Theatre. The work is best remembered today for its Act 1 kiss scene which was re-created by Irwin with her co-star John C. Rice as a short film in Thomas Edison's The Kiss in 1896.

== Plot ==
Irwin portrays Beatrice Byke an un-married "fat-fair-and-forty" woman who has run away to Maine and assumed the false identity of a widow going by the surname Jones in order to avoid her many ardent suitors. Over the course of the play she is forced to pay the bills of her false husband, a man who allegedly died from drowning, only to eventually come face to face with the supposedly drowned man.

== Performances and Edison film ==
The Widow Jones premiered at the Boston Museum on September 2, 1895, and then went on tour for performances in cities throughout the United States. Part of this tour included performances at Broadway's Bijou Theatre where it began its run on September 16, 1895. The production left New York City to perform on tour, but ultimately returned for more performances at the Bijou Theatre beginning on March 16, 1896. On April 21, 1896 at the Bijou Theatre the show's producer's, Rich & Harris of Boston, presented Irwin with a custom made silver perfume bottle and a plaque to celebrate the production's 300th performance given during the production's run (not all on Broadway, but collectively).

The Kiss

Thomas Edison hired the play's stars, May Irwin and John Rice, to recreate the kiss seen in act 1 of the play for the 1896 short film, The Kiss, made in Edison's Kinetoscope process. The film was acquired by the Film Library of the Museum of Modern Art in 1935.

== Songs ==
- "His Legs Are Assorted Sizes" (music by Geo. H. Wilder, lyrics by Lawrence J. Sheehan)
- "I Love My Honey Yes I Do" (music and lyrics by Will C. Carleton)
- "The New Bully" (music and lyrics by Charles E. Trevathan)
- "I Want Yer Ma, Honey"
