= The Kiss (1896 film) =

1896 American short silent film

- Full film
- Directed by: William Heise
- Based on: The Widow Jones; 1895 Broadway musical by John J. McNally
- Starring: May Irwin; John Rice
- Distributed by: Thomas A. Edison, Inc.
- Release date: April 1896
- Running time: 18 seconds
- Country: United States
- Language: English (silent)

The Kiss (also known as The May Irwin Kiss, The Rice-Irwin Kiss and The Widow Jones) is an 1896 short film, and was one of the first films ever shown commercially to the public. Around 18 seconds long, it depicts a re-enactment of the kiss between May Irwin and John Rice from the final scene of the stage musical The Widow Jones. The film was directed by William Heise for Thomas Edison. The film was produced in April 1896 at the Edison Studios of Edison, the first film studio in the United States. At the time, Edison was working at the Black Maria studios in West Orange, New Jersey.

In 1999, the short was deemed "culturally significant" by the United States Library of Congress and selected for preservation in the National Film Registry.

== Cast ==
- May Irwin as Widow Jones
- John Rice as Billie Bikes

== Production ==
The film was one of the last shot at Edison's Black Maria.

== Release ==
According to Charles Musser the film was released in either April or May 1896, and was publicized in a sponsored article in the New York World about actors kissing on stage. The article discussed the controversy surrounding onstage kissing and, along with an illustration of the Irwin and Rice kiss, referred readers to The Widow Jones and the Edison film. The campaign sought to bring attention to the newspaper, play, and movie all at once. The film was shown during demonstrations of the Vitascope.

Charles Frohman was initially against the film, stating that "I shall have to consider replacing Miss Irwin" in The Widow Jones, but then asked for Edson Raff to have advertising for the short include that Irwin was the star of The Widow Jones.

The film was sold to exhibitors for $7.50 ($232 in 2020) and it was being shown at the end of almost every show by the fall of 1896.

== Reaction ==
The film was alleged to have caused a scandalized uproar and occasioned disapproving newspaper editorials and calls for police action in many places where it was shown. One contemporary critic wrote, "The spectacle of the prolonged pasturing on each other's lips was beastly enough in life size on the stage but magnified to gargantuan proportions and repeated three times over it is absolutely disgusting." However, according to Dengler (1979) in the Journal of Popular Film and Television, the shocked reaction of the general public is a myth.

The Edison catalogue advertised it this way: "They get ready to kiss, begin to kiss, and kiss and kiss and kiss in a way that brings down the house every time."

Something Good – Negro Kiss (1898)

Perhaps in defiance, and "to spice up a film", this film was followed by many imitators and take-offs, including Something Good – Negro Kiss (1898), The Kiss in the Tunnel (1899) and The Kiss (1900).

== Public exposure ==
For a number of years, it was believed that a showing of The Kiss was the first film publicly shown in Canada, projected in West End Park, Ottawa, on July 21, 1896. It has since been learned that the competing Lumière Brothers Cinematograph had already exhibited different films in Montreal 24 days earlier, on June 27, 1896.

== Works cited ==
- Foster, Charles (2000). Stardust and Shadows: Canadians in Early Hollywood. Dundurn Press. ISBN 1550023489.
- Eagan, Daniel (2010). America's Film Legacy: The Authoritative Guide to the Landmark Movies in the National Film Registry. Continuum International Publishing Group. ISBN 9780826418494.
- Williams, Linda (2008). Screening Sex. Duke University Press. ISBN 9780822342632.
