= Scott Marble =

American playwright (1847–1919)

Scott Marble (1847 – April 5, 1919) was an American playwright who wrote the 1896 stage melodrama The Great Train Robbery which in 1903 was made into a film of the same name that later would be regarded as a classic movie Western. For the female impersonator George W. Munroe he wrote the play My Aunt Bridget (1886); a work which had a lengthy national tour in vaudeville in the late nineteenth century. His other plays include Tennessee's Pardner (1894), The Sidewalks of New York (1895), The Cotton Spinner (1896), The Heart of the Klondike (1897), and Have You Seen Smith? (1898), On Land and Sea (1898), and Daughters of the Poor (1899). The composer Richard Stahl wrote the book for the romantic opera Said Pascha which originally was produced at the Tivoli Opera House in San Francisco in 1888.

Marble was born in Pennsylvania in 1847. He moved to the Chicago area circa 1878 and worked there as an actor in the 1880s. He and his wife, actress Grace Marble, had four children. He died in New York City, on April 5, 1919.
