= David Warfield =

19th/20th-century American actor

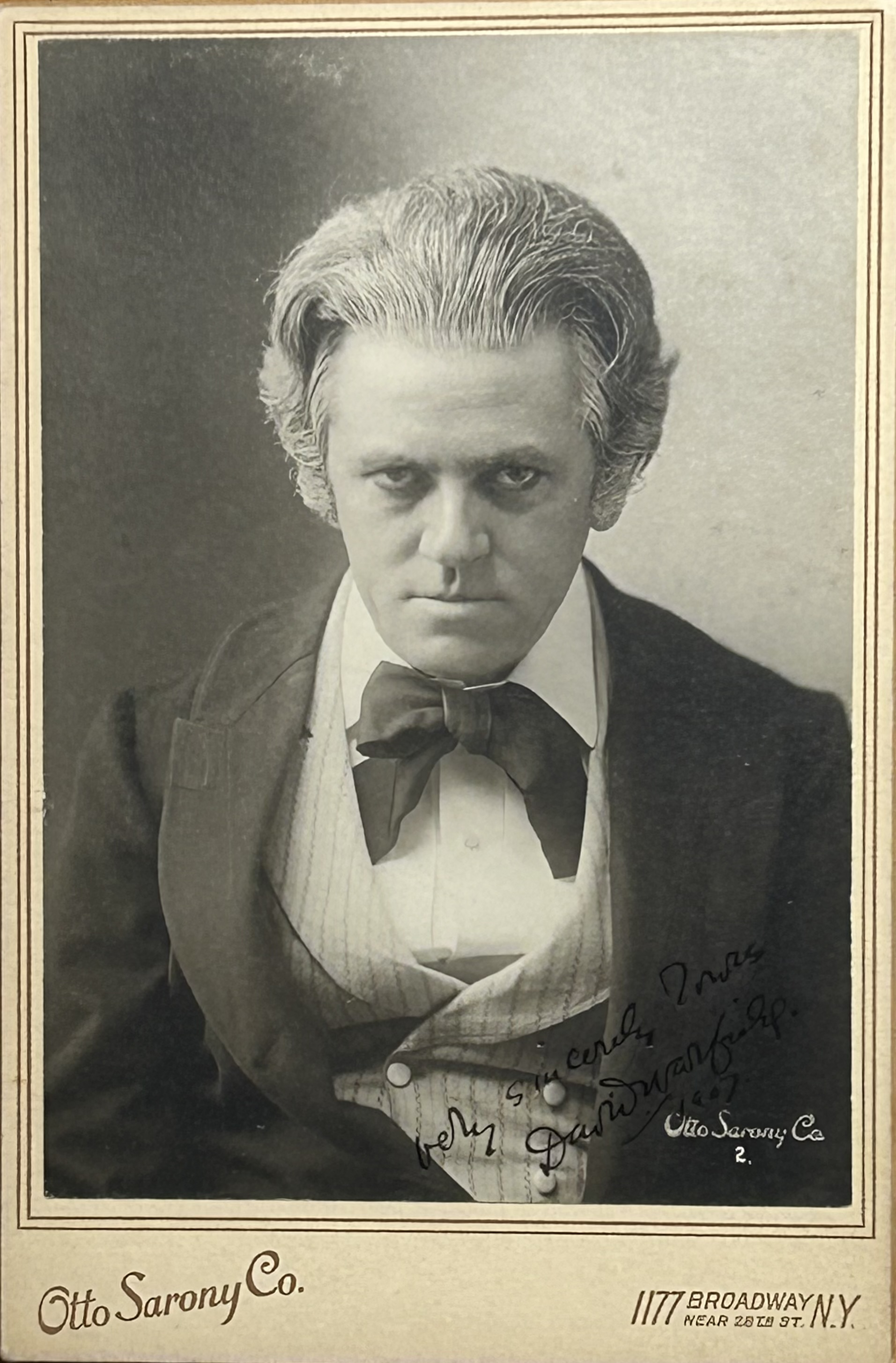
- Signed Photo
- Born: David Wohlfeld; November 28, 1866; San Francisco, California, U.S.
- Died: June 27, 1951 (aged 84); New York, New York, U.S.
- Years active: c. 1888-1930
- Spouse: Mary Gabrielle Bradt (married 1899)

David Warfield (November 28, 1866 – June 27, 1951) was an American stage actor.

== Career ==
Warfield was born David Wohlfeld in San Francisco to German-Jewish parents, Louise and Sigmund Wohlfeld. His first connection with the theater was as an usher. He made his first stage appearance in 1888 in The Ticket-of-Leave Man. In 1890, he went to New York City and appeared at the Casino Theatre on Broadway and at Weber and Field's Music Hall, also a Broadway theater in Manhattan. In 1901, he was discovered and promoted by David Belasco who cast him in The Auctioneer. Warfield performed in the role 1,400 times, including a revival which extended over several seasons. He was managed by Belasco.

Warfield appeared in many productions; his fortune and success in theater centered on playing four major roles over 25 years: Simon Levi in The Auctioneer (1901), Anton von Barwig in The Music Master (1904), Wes Bigelow in A Grand Army Man (1907), and the title role in The Return of Peter Grimm (1911). One of his best-known roles was portraying Anton von Barwig in The Music Master, which he played from 1904 to 1908, appearing in the part more than 1000 times. In 1908, Warfield and his company appeared at the Elitch Theatre in Denver, in The Music Master and A Grand Army Man. His company included Antoinette Perry from Denver and a namesake of the Tony Awards. In 1911, Warfield created the title role in The Return of Peter Grimm, a play Cecil B. DeMille claimed that David Belasco stole from DeMille.

Warfield's position as a leading actor in comedy was established by the masterful style he portrayed in plays, a kindly old gentleman who is pathetic in misfortune and amusingly eccentric. In 1916, he appeared in Van der Decken, a play by Belasco based on the legend of The Flying Dutchman. The Warfield Theatre in San Francisco, Warfield's birthplace is named in his honor. Warfield, at the time one of the world's richest entertainers, died in New York City at 84.

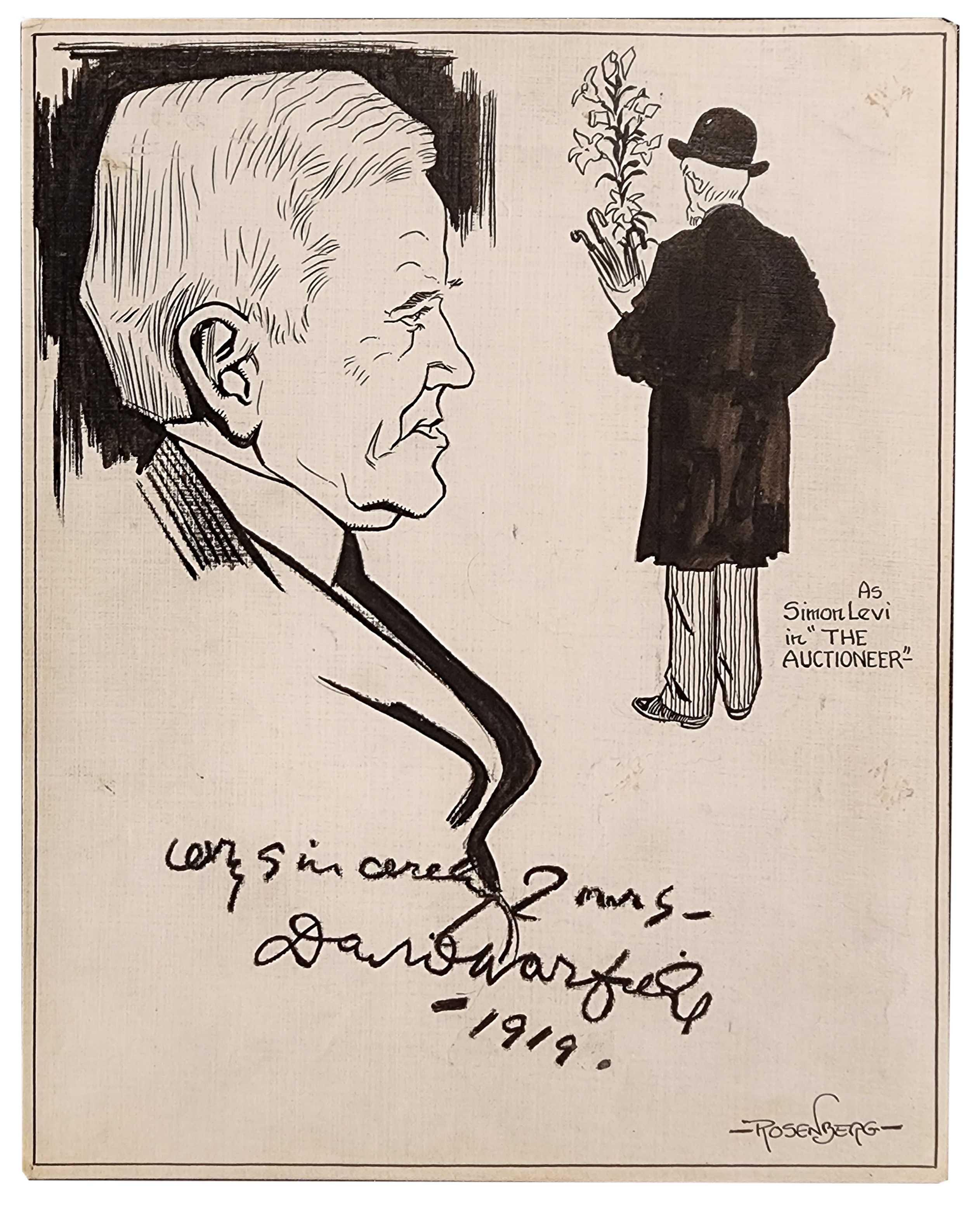
Signed drawing of David Warfield by Manuel Rosenberg for the Cincinnati Post, 1919

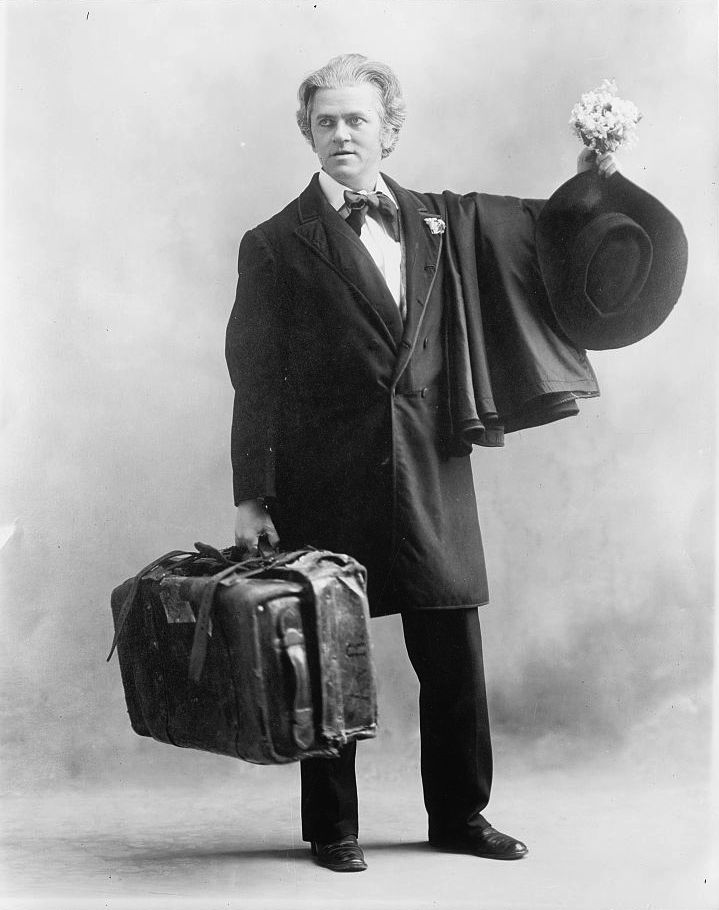
