= Thomas A. Wise =

American actor (1865–1928)

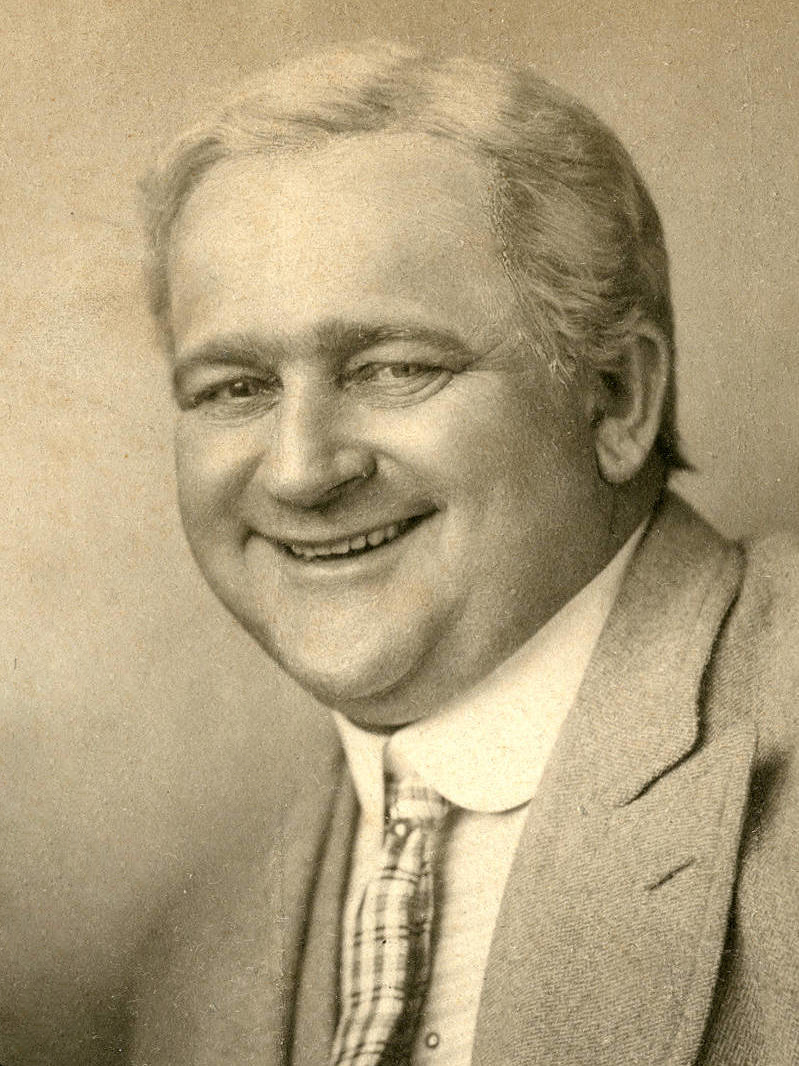
- Tom Wise c. 1901

Shepherd of The Lambs
- In office 1926–1928
- Preceded by: Thomas Meighan
- Succeeded by: Fritz Williams

Personal details
- Born: March 23, 1865 Faversham, England
- Died: March 21, 1928 (aged 62) Manhattan, New York City
- Spouse: Gertrude Whitty
- Occupation: actor

Thomas Alfred Wise (March 23, 1865 - March 21, 1928) was an American actor and Shepherd (president) of The Lambs from 1926 to 1928.

== Biography ==
Wise was born on March 23, 1865, in Faversham, England. He emigrated to the United States at the age of three, and made his stage debut in Dixon, California, in 1883 at a variety show.

He married Gertrude Whitty (1864–1929) on November 11, 1895, in Cuyahoga, Ohio.

Wise died on March 21, 1928, in Manhattan, New York City.

== Performances ==
- Are You a Mason? (1901)
- The Little Cherub (1906)
- Miss Hook of Holland (1907)
- A Gentleman from Mississippi (1908)
- An Old New Yorker (1911)
- The Silver Wedding (1913)
- The Song of Songs (1914)
- Caliban of the Yellow Sands (1916)
- Cappy Ricks (1919)
- Behold This Dreamer (1927)

== Filmography ==
- Blue Grass (1915)
