= The Father (Dunlap play) =

The Father; or, American Shandyism is a 1789 play by William Dunlap, his first published play, and according to Dunlap's later report, the second American comedy ever produced.

Dunlap's second play (the first was lost and never produced), it was first performed at the John Street Theatre in New York on September 7, 1789. It played four times before being produced in Philadelphia and Baltimore (once in each). It was published in the Massachusetts Magazine in the October and November 1789 issues. It was also performed in Philadelphia during the 1790–91 season.

As the play's alternate title suggests, Dunlap borrowed from the popular novel Tristram Shandy in creating the work.

A second edition of the play titled Father of an Only Child was published in 1807.

== Original New York cast ==
- Colonel Duncan by John Henry
- Mr. Racket by Lewis Hallam Jr.
- Ranter by Charles Biddle
- Captain Haller by Joseph Harper
- Lieutenant Campley by Stephen Woolls
- Doctor Quiescent by Thomas Wignell
- Cartridge by Mr. Ryan
- Jacob by Mr. Lake
- Mrs. Racket by Elizabeth Morris (Mrs. Owen Morris)
- Miss Felton by Maria Storer Henry (Mrs. Henry)
- Mrs. Grenade by Mrs. Harper
- Susannah by Eliza Tuke (Miss Tuke)
