= Old American Company =

American theatre company

The Old American Company was an American theatre company. It was the first fully professional theatre company to perform in North America. It also played a vital role in the theatre history of Jamaica. It was founded in 1752 and disbanded in 1805. It was known as the Hallam Company (1752–1758), the American Company (1758–1785) and the Old American Company (1785–1805). With a few temporary exceptions, the Company enjoyed a de facto monopoly of professional theatre in the United States until 1790.

== History ==
=== Hallam Company ===
The company was organised by William Hallam, former proprietor of the New Wells Theatre in London, and was led by his brother Lewis Hallam. Their company consisted of 12 adults and three children, drawn from English actors of "modest accomplishment". They were also known as the "Comedy of Comedians from London."

They arrived by the vessel Charming Sally at Yorktown, Virginia, on 2 June 1752, and made their early performances in nearby Williamsburg. Their first performance, The Merchant of Venice, is generally considered to be the first professional staging of Shakespeare in America. In 1753, the Hallam company moved to New York City, and played there from September 17, 1753, to March 18, 1754. They played in Philadelphia for two months starting on April 15, 1754. The company then traveled to Charleston, South Carolina.

=== First Jamaica Tour ===
In 1755 the company moved to Jamaica in the West Indies. In Jamaica, they performed in the "New Theatre" in the King's Store on Harbour Street in Kingston with the company of David Douglass. On Lewis Hallam's death, David Douglass married his widow Sarah Hallam Douglass. The Hallam company merged with the company of David Douglass. In 1758, the company returned to tour the mainland, as the "American Company".

=== American Company ===
Lewis' son, Lewis Hallam Jr., eighteen at the time of the American Company's first tour, took leading roles alongside Douglass. Lewis Jr.'s style was described as declaratory rather than realistic, but he was much admired and became known as America's leading Shakespearean interpreter. Douglass had his limitations: one Alexander Graydon described him as "rather a decent than shining actor". However, he was a capable manager and he gave North America its first Falstaff and King John. Within the repertoire was Cymbeline, which proved a popular vehicle for two of the company's actresses, Margaret Cheer and Nancy Hallam. Douglass built the Society Hill Theatre in Philadelphia in 1759, having the company play there for six months before protests halted theatrical performances. He also built the Southwark Theatre in Philadelphia in 1766, which was the first permanent theatre structure in North America. On April 24, 1767, at the Southwark, the American Company staged The Prince of Parthia by Thomas Godfrey, the first production in the United States of a play written by an American. The John Street Theatre was built in New York in 1767, modeled after the Southwark.

In Quaker and Puritan areas, the company encountered religious opposition to theatre in general. At Rhode Island in 1761 they were obliged to perform Othello disguised as "a series of moral dialogues".

=== Second Jamaica Tour ===
In 1774, the Continental Congress banned theatre entirely, and the company resettled in Jamaica. By that time, Hugh F. Ranking calculates that the company had performed at least 180 times, their repertoire having included fourteen of Shakespeare's plays.

The Company achieved great success in Jamaica, as the island had a great interest for theatre but no professional theater had existed since they left sixteen years prior. Finding the old playhouse in Kingston not sufficient to their needs, the company successfully asked the authorities to construct the Kingston Theatre in Kingston, where they performed three or four times a week from 1775 onward: they also constructed theatres in Spanish Town and Montego Bay. David Douglass even served in the office of Master of the Revels, responsible of the representational festivities of the Governor, in 1779–80, and Lewis Hallam Jr. in 1781–1783.

=== Old American Company ===
After the peace of 1783, the company left Jamaica in July 1785 and returned to New York, with Lewis Hallam Jr. as the leading actor, and John Henry as his co-manager. The theatre ban was still in place, and until it was lifted, the company officially named its plays "recitals", operatic performances and similar euphemisms for theater plays. For part of 1786 the company was in residence at the newly built Richmond Theatre in Virginia, then known as Quesnay's Academy.

The Old American Company virtually had monopoly of theatre performances in the United States until 1790, when Thomas Wade West and John Bignall split from the Company and formed the Virginia Comedians, performing in Virginia and South Carolina, followed the next year by the foundation of the Philadelphia Company of Thomas Wignell and Owen Morris. After this, the Old American Company was essentially active in New York: first at the John Street Theatre, and from 1798 at the Park Theatre. In 1805, the Company went bankrupt.

=== Legacy ===
The Company enjoyed a de facto monopoly on professional theatrical performances in North America until the 1790s. In many places, they were the first professional company to perform theatre, and they founded playhouses for their use in many of the cities and towns they visited, often the very first playhouses in those places. They toured from Newport in Rhode Island to Williamsburg in Virginia, and between Annapolis, Philadelphia and New York. They founded a playhouse in New York in 1754, the 'New Theatre' playhouse in Charleston, South Carolina in 1754, the Southwark Theatre in Philadelphia in 1766, the John Street Theatre in New York in 1767, and the New Theatre in Annapolis in 1770.

== Managers ==
- 1752-1756: Lewis Hallam
- 1756-1758: Sarah Hallam Douglass
- 1758-1779: David Douglass
- 1779-1796: Lewis Hallam Jr.
- 1780-1794: John Henry, Co-manager
- 1794-1799: John Hodgkinson, Co-manager
- 1796-1805: William Dunlap

== Members ==
=== Hallam Company in 1752 ===
In 1752, when the Hallam Company departed from London and arrived in Williamsburg in Virginia, the Company had twelve adult members: Lewis Hallam and his wife Sarah Hallam, William Rigby and his wife, Thomas Clarkson and his wife, Mary Palmer, John Singleton, Mr. Herbert, Mr. Winnell, William Adcock, and Patrick Malone.

=== American Company in 1766 ===
In November 1766, when the Southwark Theatre in Philadelphia opened, the American Company had the following members: Sarah Hallam Douglass, her husband David Douglass, and her son Lewis Hallam Jr.; Margaret Cheer; Stephen Woolls; Adam Allyn; Miss Dowthwaite; James Godwin; Catharine Maria Harman; Mr. Mathews; Owen and Mary Morris; Anna Tomlinson and her husband; Sarah Wainwright; and Thomas Wall.

By October 1767, new members were John Henry, Ms. Storers (Ann, Maria and Fanny), Patrick Malone, and Mr. Roberts.

=== American Company in 1773 ===
In 1773–74, when the American Company departed to Jamaica, the Company had the following members: David Douglass, Lewis Hallam Jr., Nancy Hallam, John Henry, Elizabeth Walker Morris, Mr. Byerley, Mr. Dermot, Richard Goodman, Catharine Maria Harman, Mr. Johnson, Owen Morris, Charles Parker, Mary Richardson, Mr. Roberts, Miss Storer (Ann, Maria or Fanny), Thomas Wall, Mrs. Wall, Stephen Woolls, George Hughues, and Sarah Wainwright.

The cast lists mention Thomas Wignell, Mrs. Hamilton, Mrs. Raynard, Mr. Sales, Mr. Mores, Mr. and Mrs. Godwin in the period of 1779-82.

=== Old American Company in 1788 ===
In 1788, around the time when the theatre ban was lifted in the United States, the American Company had the following members: Lewis Hallam Jr., John Henry, Maria Henry, Stephen Woolls, Owen Morris, Elizabeth Walker Morris, Thomas Wignell, Charles Biddle, Mr. J. Kenna, Mrs. Kenna, Miss Kenna, Eliza Tuke, Mrs. Hamilton, Mrs. Williamsson, Joseph Harper, Mrs. Harper, and Fanny Storer.

Other members included John Martin (from 1790), referred to as the first American-born actor. In 1792, John Hodgkinson joined.

=== Old American Company in 1798 ===
In 1798, when the American Company moved into Park Theatre in New York, the Company had the following members (listed in order of salary): Lewis Hallam Jr., Eliza Hallam, John Johnson, Mrs. Johnson, Georgina George Oldmixon, Thomas Apthorpe Cooper, Charlotte Melmoth, Joseph Tyler, Joseph Jefferson I, John Martin, Mirvan Hallam, Ann Storer Hogg, John Hogg, Juliana Westray, Ellen Westray, Mr. Lee, Mrs. Seymour, Mr. Seymour, John D. Miller, Miss. Hogg, and Mrs. Collins.

=== Old American Company in 1804 ===
In 1804, the last season of the American Company, the Company had the following members: Lewis Hallam Jr., Eliza Hallam, John E. Harwood, John Johnson, Elizabeth Ford Johnson, Joseph Tyler, Ann Storer Hogg, John Hogg, John Martin, John Claude, Mrs. Claude, Joseph Harper, Mrs. Harper, John Darley, Ellen Darley, Mr. Darby, Charlotte Melmoth, Mirvan Hallam, Mr. Shapter, Mr. Robinson, and Mr. M'Donald.

== Sources ==
- Davis, Andrew (2010). America's Longest Run: A History of the Walnut Street Theatre. Penn State Press. ISBN 9780271030531.
- Morrison, Michael A. (2002). "Shakespeare in North America". In Wells, Stanley; Stanton, Sarah (eds.). The Cambridge Companion to Shakespeare on Stage. Cambridge University Press.
