= Elizabeth Walker Morris =

American actress

Elizabeth Walker Morris (died 17 April 1826 in Philadelphia), was an English-born American stage actress. She was engaged in the Old American Company.

Elizabeth Walker Morris was married to the actor Owen Morris (d. 1809) in his second marriage. She is first noted to have performed as a member of the Old American Company in the Southwark Theatre in Philadelphia in 1772. As a member of that troupe she toured through the colonies and to the West Indies before returning to New York in 1785.

Elizabeth Walker Morris was described as a tall beauty with a preference for high heels and a dislike for attention outside of the stage. She was referred to as one of the greatest theatrical stars of the 18th-century American theatre and very popular in her time, also within contemporary press reviews and critics. The Pennsylvania Biographical Dictionary described her as "the greatest attraction of the American stage [...] especially in higher comedy." She reportedly became the first actress in America to play the role of Beatrice in Much Ado About Nothing on 18 March 1789 in Philadelphia.

However, Elizabeth Walker Morris was reportedly involved in a conflict with her colleague Maria Henry, supported by Thomas Wignell, while John Henry was in conflict with Owen Morris, conflicts which eventually resulted in them leaving the company. In 1792, the Morris couple left the American Company to form their own theatre company in collaboration with Thomas Wignell; then just the third theatre company in America. Together they performed in the first theatrical season ever given in the history of Boston. From 1794 to 1810, she performed at the Chestnut Street Theatre in Philadelphia.
