= Margaret Cheer =

American actress

Margaret Cheer (d. February 15, 1800 in Old Harbour, Jamaica), was an English-born American stage actress known as Miss Cheer. She was engaged in the Old American Company, the first permanent theater company in America, and as such belonged to the first generation of pioneer actresses in North America.

== Life ==
Margaret Cheer was engaged at the Company in 1764. She made her debut in Charleston, South Carolina, in 1764. She was described as great asset to the Company, as she knew at least 35 contemporary roles. She performed Shakespeare-heroines such as Juliet, Ophelia and Lady Macbeth. She became a leading member of the company and shared and then gradually supplanted Sarah Hallam Douglass in the principal female roles. She was greatly admired for her beauty, voice and dramatic ability.

In 1769, she married 19 year old David Carnegie, Lord Rosehill and acquired the name 'Lady Rosehill'. Carnegie, the eldest son of Admiral George Carnegie, 6th Earl of Northesk, was already married, making him a bigamist. He had married Christian Cameron, daughter of Alexander Cameron of Dungallon, in the Scottish Highlands two years earlier.

In contrast to what would have been expected by contemporary norms, she did not retire from stage after her marriage. Her career does seem to have become more irregular after her marriage, however, and Nancy Hallam replaced her as leading lady. After her marriage, she became known under the stage name 'Mrs. Long'.

She is known to have been irregularly active in the American Company until 1794, except for the periods of 1773-74 and 1781-94. She is thus noted to have been active in the American Company during their second period in Jamaica during the American Revolutionary War (1775–85). In Jamaica, she produced her own play, a farce written by herself and named 'The West India Lady's Arrival in London', performed at the Kingston Theatre in 1781. After 1781, she appears not to have acted until 1793, when she made an unsuccessful attempt to return to the stage in the elder Colman's The Jealous Wife at the John Street Theatre.

As Mrs. Long she operated a lodging house in Spanish Town, Jamaica in 1781, and later operated a tavern in nearby Old Harbour, Jamaica, which she managed until her death on February 15, 1800.
