= Elizabeth Johnson (actress) =

English actress (1771–1830)

Elizabeth Johnson (1771 – June 18, 1830), known primarily by the stage name Mrs. Johnson but also known by her maiden name Elizabeth Ford and the stage name Miss Ford, was an English actress who had an influential transatlantic stage career in England and the United States from 1790 through 1817.

== Life and career ==
Born Elizabeth Ford in Ipswich, Suffolk, England in 1771, she was the daughter of Major Ford. She began her career with John Brunton's circuit of theatres in Norfolk sometime before 1790. The earliest specific record of one of her performances was at Theatre Royal, Norwich in 1790 where she was acting under the name Miss Ford. She married the actor John Johnson (1759–1819) around this times, and in 1772 began appearing on the stage as Mrs. Johnson; the name she used for the rest of her career. In 1793–1794 she was committed to the Old Orchard Street Theatre in Bath and Bristol Old Vic in Bristol; appearing in Tate Wilkinson's The Wandering Patentee. Wilkinson stated of Johnson's performance that "she was most favorably received but too lavishly puffed. Wilkinson also engaged Johnson for performances in York in August and September 1794.

Johnson and her husband first came to the United States in 1795 after being engaged by impresario and actor John Hodgkinson for performances with his Old American Company. The couple made their American debuts in Colley Cibber's The Provoked Husband at the Federal Street Theatre in Boston on November 5, 1795. William Dunlap in his History of the American Theatre (1832), wrote the following description of Johnson's early appearances in the United States,

Mrs. Johnson was a tall, elegant, beautiful young woman, whose taste in dress made her a model for the belles of the city, and whose manners were as fascinating off as on the stage. Her irreproachable character and demeanour rendered her playfulness harmless to herself or others, for the most licentious would see at a glance that he must not approach, in that character, within the circle of her influence. She was almost too tall, yet the spectator did not wish lier shorter, and if any movement appeared like an approach to awkwardness, it was only to be attributed to modesty. She had not the self-possession of Miss Farren or Mrs. Merry, though more like the first than the last. She was more beautiful, but not so good an actress as either, and at the time we now speak of, America had not seen so perfect a fine lady in comedy."

== Bibliography ==
- William Dunlap (2010). A History of the American Theatre from Its Origins to 1832. University of Illinois Press. ISBN 978-0-252-09103-2.
