= Frances Brett Hodgkinson =

American actress (1771–1803)

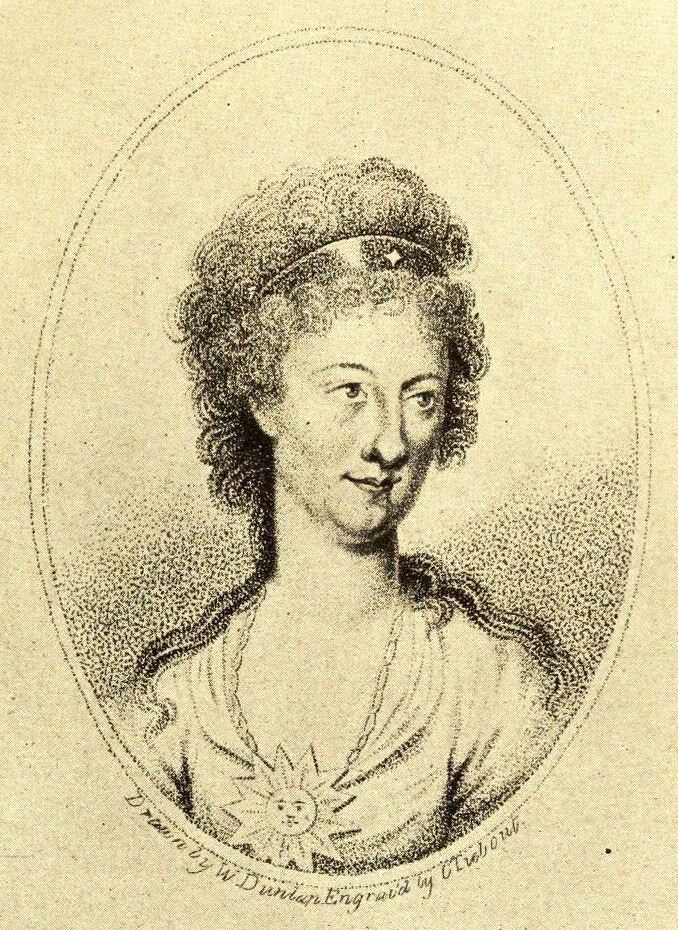
- Frances Brett Hodgkinson
- Born: 1771; Bath, England
- Died: September 23, 1803 (aged 31–32); Philadelphia, Pennsylvania
- Spouse: John Hodgkinson

Frances Brett Hodgkinson (1771–1803) was an English-born American theater actress. She played major roles in high comedy and tragedy plays and was also a noted performer of opera. She was the second wife of John Hodgkinson, a famous American stage actor.

== Biography ==
Hodgkinson was born in 1771 in England to a family of performers. Her parents, William and Hannah, also referred to as Mr. and Mrs. Brett, were both stage actors and were prominent performers of the Bath-Bristol company and Foote's Haymarket. Hodgkinson was the eldest in the family.

Hodgkinson and her mother came to Bath and Bristol when William Brett died in 1789. In 1790, English actor John Hodgkinson moved from Exeter to join the Bath-Bristol company and eventually became the lead actor of the troupe. This is where he met the then Frances Brett. Hodgkinson was married to his first wife and for this reason, he emigrated to the United States to marry Frances Brett.

John and Frances Hodgkinson had two daughters and one son. Frances Hodgkinson contracted tuberculosis but still performed on stage despite her illness. In History of American Theatre, William Dunlap stated how she appeared so unwell when she played Letitia Hardy on June 15, 1803, and would perform several days later in The Stranger "looking so as to make the writer's heart ache". According to Dunlap, those around her had the impression that she was compelled to perform. She died in Philadelphia on September 27, 1803, due to tuberculosis and was buried at New York's Saint John's Cemetery.

== Career ==
Hodgkinson and her four siblings started performing on stage at an early age. She performed at Bath and Bristol from 1781 to 1783, playing juvenile roles. She debuted in London's Haymarket Theatre in 1784, playing a dwarf in Thomas Holcroft's comic opera, The Noble Peasant. Early in her acting career, she was simply called as Miss Brett to distinguish herself from her sister, who was referred to as Miss W. Brett. Both often shared the same playbills. In October 1787, she had her debut as a singer at the Rotunda. She became associated with the "singing chambermaids", a part of the late 18th-century musical theater tradition.

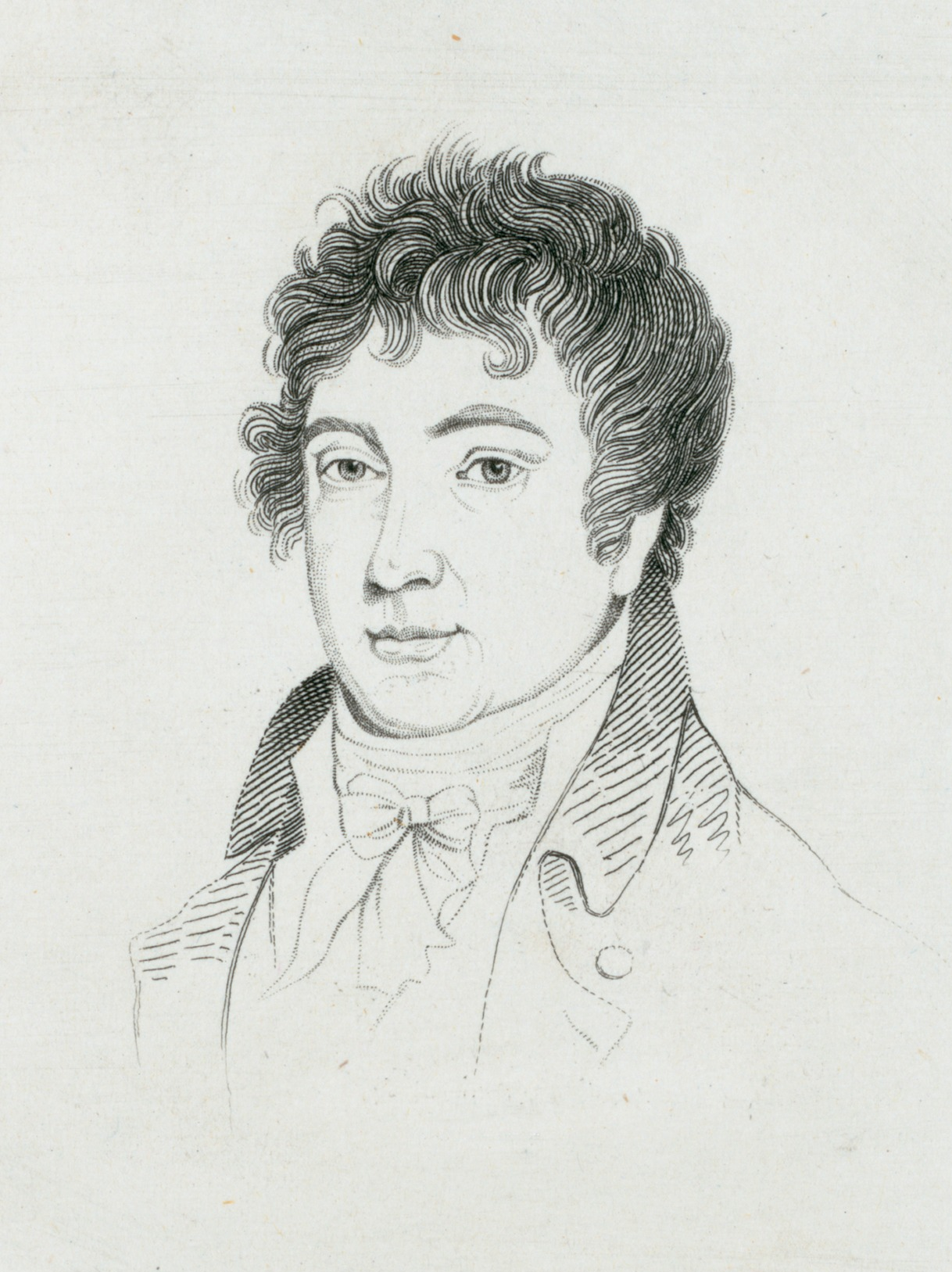
Illustration of John Hodgkinson, Frances Hodgkinson's husband.

The Hodgkinsons sailed to America in 1792 after entering a contract with John Henry together with eight other actors including Brett's mother as well as her sister and her husband, William King. They joined the Old American Company, which was the first professional theater in North America. John Hodgkinson was first seen as Don Felix in The Wonder while Frances Hodgkinson in The Padlock as Leonora. After dominating the troupe managed by Lewis Hallam and John Henry, John was declared as "superior to any other actor" and would enjoy such stature for around ten years in all of the principal theater centers in America. An account by William Dunlap described Frances Hodgkinson as a versatile actress, who "surpassed all her contemporaries in rustic comedy and singing parts, in chambermaids and soubrettes." By 1800, the pair became the highest-paid performers in American stage history. She had a weekly salary of $50. Although her husband was paid $70, her remuneration was still significantly ahead of her peers such as Hallam and his wife, whose combined salary amounted to $50. John Hodgkinson became part of the management and revitalization of the American Company.

One of Hodgkinson's notable performances in America was Manana, a part in Ann Hatton's opera Tammany. She played opposite her husband, who played the titular role of an Indian chief.
