= Eliza Hallam =

American actress

Eliza Hallam née Tuke (died 1817), was an American stage actress.

Eliza Hallam was the sister of the actress Sarah Tuke and was engaged in the Old American Company in 1787-1806. She was given very bad critics her first years onstage. However, after having married Lewis Hallam Jr. after the death of his first spouse Sarah Perry Hallam in 1793, she was given personal training by him and given larger roles, and in a very short time reportedly made swift approval and came to enjoy great popularity. It was said of her that:

"She was the first American actress to attain celebrity and this she owed to the assiduous attentions of her husband, whose instructions raised her from comparative worthlessness to a high station in the theatre.

Because of her alcoholism, however, a great scandal, which attracted a great deal of attention, occurred when she appeared intoxicated onstage. This resulted in her being fired by John Hodgkinson. An outcry from the audience after an appeal from the stage by her spouse, however, enticed Hodgkinson to engage her a second time. In 1806, she and her spouse was engaged at the Philadelphia Company. She seem to have retired from the stage when she was widowed in 1808.
