= Elizabeth Ford =

Elisabeth Ford may refer to:

- Betty Ford, first lady of the United States from 1974 to 1977, as the wife of President Gerald Ford
- Elizabeth Johnson (actress) (1771 —1830), English actress who performed under her maiden name Elizabeth Ford before her marriage
