= Stephen Woolls =

American actor

Stephen Woolls (1729-1799) was an American actor and singer, and member of the American and Old American Company.

Woolls was born in Bath in England. He first appeared on stage in New York at the John Street Theatre on December 7, 1767, playing the role of Gibbet in The Beaux' Stratagem and Mercury in Lethe (a satire by David Garrick). The primary singer in the company (and part owner at one point), he continued to perform and sing until shortly before his death.

According to John Durang, Woolls and Miss Wainwright of the American Company had both been students of Thomas Arne. Woolls would perform "entertainment between the acts" of plays, meaning songs, which were a popular part of the program. William Dunlap wrote in his History of the American Theatre that Woolls (spelled Wools) "was for many years the first singer of the company, continuing to figure as such long after all voice had left him, and snuff and snuffle characterized his attempts."

Woolls died in New York on June 14, 1799, and was buried in the churchyard of St. Peter's Roman Catholic Church in New York City.
