= David Douglass (actor) =

American actor

David Douglass (1720 – 1786), was a British-American stage actor and theatre manager. He was the managing director of the Old American Company between 1758 and 1779.

Douglass was a member of the British Theatre Company of John Moody, which became the first permanent theater company in Jamaica when they came to Kingston in 1746; they were given their first permanent playhouse in "New Theatre" or King's Store on Harbour Street seven years later. Douglass became the manager of the company in 1749.

He married Sarah Hallam Douglass, the director of the Old American Company, and took over as manager with his stepson Lewis Hallam Jr. as co-manager. He accompanied the Company when they returned to the Thirteen Colonies from Jamaica. Douglass had his limitations: Alexander Graydon described him as "rather a decent than shining actor". However, he was a capable manager and he gave North America its first Falstaff and King John.

Douglass built the Society Hill Theatre in Philadelphia in 1759, with his company performing there for six months before protests halted theatrical works there. He built the Southwark Theatre in Philadelphia in 1766, which was the first permanent theatre structure in North America. He chose to stage The Prince of Parthia by Thomas Godfrey at the Southwark on April 24, 1767, becoming the first production in the United States of a play written by an American. The John Street Theatre in New York was built by Douglass and the American Company in 1767.

In 1774, the Old American Company returned to Jamaica. When they returned to Jamaica, the old building, having been in disuse for many years, was no longer regarded sufficient. The Old American Company under Douglass successfully asked the colonial government for a new theater building, and the Kingston Theatre was inaugurated on the Parade area in 1775. They had great success in Jamaica. David Douglass served in the office of 'Master of the Revels', responsible of the representational festivities of the Governor, in 1779–80.

David Douglass remained in Jamaica when the Company returned to the United States in 1785.

== Sources ==
- Davis, Andrew (2010). America's Longest Run: A History of the Walnut Street Theatre. Penn State Press. ISBN 9780271030531.
