= John Henry (actor) =

American actor

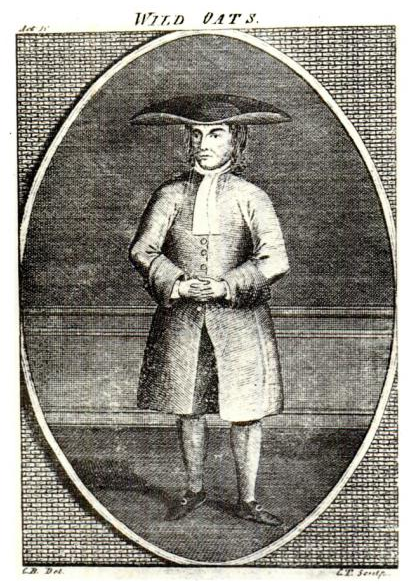
- Henry in role of Ephraim Smooth in Wild Oats, engraving by C. Tiebout
- Born: 1738; Dublin, Ireland
- Died: October 16, 1794 (aged 55–56); At sea
- Occupations: Stage actor; manager
- Spouse(s): Jane Storer (-1767); Maria Storer (at least by 1788-1794)

John Henry (1738-October 16, 1794) was an Irish-born actor and early American actor and theatre manager.

== Career ==
Henry was born in Dublin, performed there and in London, and went to Jamaica with Charles Storer and his family about 1762.

He made his New York debut at the opening of the John Street Theatre on December 7, 1767, playing the role of Aimwell in The Beaux' Stratagem. He is said to have been the first to play the role of Peter Teazle in The School for Scandal in America. At the end of the American Revolution, after additional time in England and Jamaica, he returned to America and worked with Lewis Hallam Jr. to manage the American Company. He left the company in 1794 after disagreements with actor John Hodgkinson, who he had brought to the United States in 1792 together with his wife stage actress Frances Brett Hogkinson. William Dunlap described Henry as being six feet tall "and uncommonly handsome."

Henry died at sea of illness on October 16, 1794, reportedly from complications from gout.

== Personal life ==
Henry's private life was a source of gossip during his day. He rode in a private coach, which was unusual for the time, and though seen as ostentatious he maintained it was because he had gout. Henry also had two wives, sisters surnamed Storer who were both actresses.

The first wife, Jane, and their two young children, died at sea during a ship fire in 1767 off the coast of Newport, Rhode Island. Henry and Jane's younger sister Ann survived. Henry and Ann then lived together (and she may have bore him a son), but likely never formally married. Henry eventually married younger sister Maria, who died shortly after the death of her husband from her grief over his loss.

== Selected performances ==
- The Roman Father, October 1767, as Publius Horatius (first continental appearance)
- The School for Scandal as Peter Teazle
- The Beaux' Stratagem as Aimwell, December 1767 (first New York appearance)
- School for Soldiers; or, the Deserters (play by Henry, 1781; published in Kingston, Jamaica, 1783, adapted from Le Deserteur by Louis-Sébastien Mercier)
- The Father (1789)
