= John Street Theatre =

18th-century theatre in New York City

Coordinates: 40.70977°N 74.008838°W

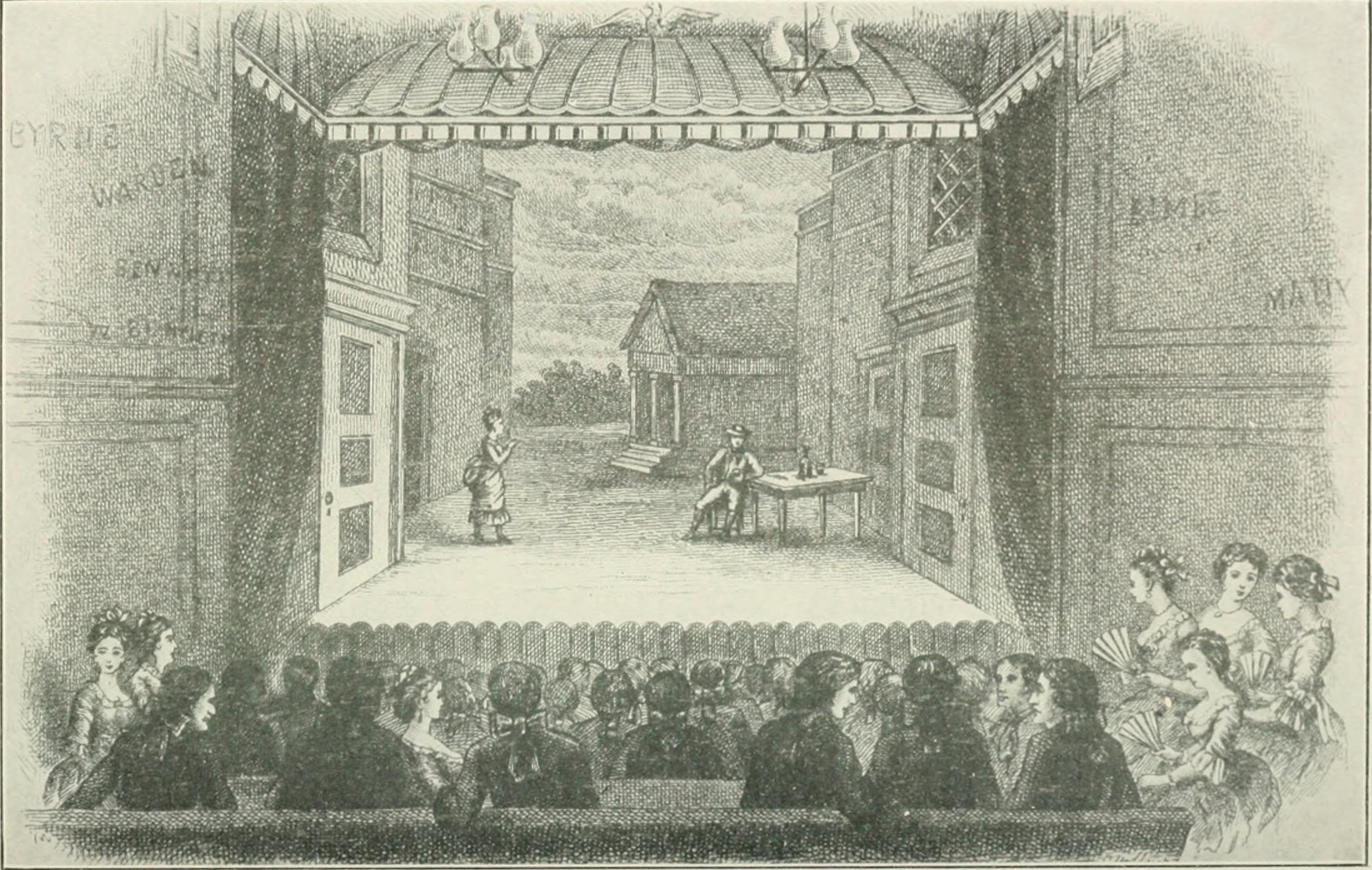
- Interior of John Street Theatre
- Interactive map of the John Street Theatre area

General information
- Location: Manhattan, New York City
- Opened: 1767
- Demolished: 1798

John Street Theatre, situated at 15–21 John Street, sometimes called "The Birthplace of American Theatre", was the first permanent theatre in the Financial District of Manhattan, New York. It opened on December 7, 1767, and was operated for several decades by the American Company. It closed on January 13, 1798.

== History ==
=== Construction and opening ===
Two figures in Roman costume, on stage; eighteenth-century audience in foreground. Scribbling, including date 1791, on wall on each side. Interior of the old John St.

The theatre was built by David Douglass (c. 1720 – 1786), an English actor who had emigrated to Jamaica in about 1750. There he met Lewis Hallam, leader of a touring theatrical company, and, after Hallam's death, married his widow, Sarah Hallam. The newly married pair formed the American Company from Hallam's old company and toured the United States performing and, if it was necessary, erecting theatres, across America. Douglass had built two temporary theatres in New York - on Cruger's Wharf and on Beekman Street - but his third New York theatre, the John Street Theatre, was the city's first permanent playhouse.

The John Street Theatre was modelled after Douglass's own Southwark Theatre in Philadelphia, the first permanent theatre in the United States, which was itself modelled on the theatres of London. No pictures survive of the building's exterior. Dunlap described it as "principally of wood, an unsightly object, painted red". It was set 60 feet back from the street, with a wooden covered walkway from the pavement to the doors. Inside, it had two tiers of boxes, a pit and a gallery. The dressing rooms and green room were located in a neighbouring shed, although Dunlap speculates that these were originally under the stage. Its seating capacity was approximately 750.

John Street opened on December 7, 1767, with a production of The Beaux' Stratagem, and for 31 years was the only theatre in Manhattan.

=== Performance history ===
From 1767 to 1774, the theatre was operated by the American Company, which gave New York its first performances of The Merchant of Venice, Macbeth, King John and Every Man in his Humour, as well as contemporary plays. The theatre was also the first to introduce "blackface" performances to the United States, with Lewis Hallam Junior's blacked-up portrayal of Mungo in The Padlock, which premiered at John Street on May 29, 1769.

A party of nine Cherokee chiefs attended a performance of Richard III at the theatre on December 14, 1767, and were so pleased with the civility of their reception that they offered to perform a traditional Cherokee war dance for a future audience: the offer was accepted, although the management, in its advertisements, requested that the audience behaved with proper decorum "as the persons who have condescended to contribute to their entertainment are of rank and consequence in their own country".

The theatre was forced to temporarily close in 1774 when the Continental Association banned the performance of stage plays, considering them to be "extravagance and dissipation". The American Company returned to the West Indies, where it had been founded.

In 1777, after the British forces captured New York during the American War of Independence, the city's British garrison took over the theatre and renamed it "Theatre Royal". The troops, under the direction of the infamous Major John André (who was eventually hanged for his part in the Benedict Arnold affair), staged plays to maintain morale during the British occupation. André was particularly known at the theatre for his scene-painting, which was much admired.

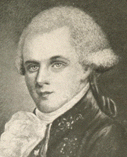
Lewis Hallam Jr, part-owner, manager and star of John Street Theatre

The British withdrew in 1783 and two years later The American Company returned to John Street Theatre, under the direction of Hallam Jr.. Beginning with small "entertainments" the company was soon performing full-scale productions at the theatre again.

During this period, the theatre gave New York its first productions of As You Like It, Much Ado About Nothing, The School for Scandal and The Critic. As well as Hallam, the theatre's regular cast included such well-known actors of the day as John Henry, Thomas Wignell, Elizabeth Walker Morris and Charlotte Melmoth.

In 1787, the theatre produced Ryall Tyler's The Contrast, in which a character, Jonathan, visits John Street Theatre, and mistakes a scene acted on the stage for a real-life family party. The play also includes a description of the theatre.

George Washington visited the theatre three times in 1789, watching The School for Scandal, The Clandestine Marriage and William Dunlap's Darby's Return.

Shortly before its closure, the theatre produced what is considered to be America's earliest musical - The Archers (subtitled The Mountaineers of Switzerland). Written by Dunlap and Benjamin Carr, and based on the legend of William Tell, it ran for three performances from April 18 to 22, 1796.

=== Final years and closure ===
John Hodgkinson, an English actor newly arrived in New York, joined the American Company in 1792. He soon became extremely popular with the public, alienating the theatre's managers and current stars, John Henry and Lewis Hallam Jr, leading to acrimonious arguments. Henry eventually resigned from the company in 1794 and Hallam left three years later, leaving Hodgkinson and William Dunlap as the theatre's managers.

The theatre building itself was growing shabby and was no longer considered prestigious enough for a city of New York's growing importance. In 1795, plans had been made to build a new theatre, Park Theatre, on Park Row, Manhattan. Hallam and Hodgkinson had, despite their differences, jointly acquired the lease of it, with the intention of the new theatre becoming the new home of the American Company. Construction was slow, but it eventually opened on January 29, 1798. The American Company transferred there, and remained at Park Theatre, under Dunlap's direction, Hodgkinson having himself resigned shortly after Hallam, until 1805.

Meanwhile, the John Street Theatre was rented to Sollee's theatrical company, from Boston, for the autumn 1797 season. Sollee's cast included Eliza Arnold, mother of Edgar Allan Poe, and Elizabeth Whitlock, sister of Sarah Siddons. Afterwards, the American Company gave a last brief winter 1797/98 season at the theatre before moving to Park Theatre.

The John Street Theatre was used for the last time on January 13, 1798, after which Hallam sold it for £115 to the neighbouring grain and hay store, which briefly used the building for an extension of its business.

It was demolished in late 1798. The Downtown New York branch of Brasserie Les Halles occupied part of the site (and is now known as Chez Francis).
