= Federal Street Theatre =

Coordinates: 42°21′19.97″N 71°3′23.48″W

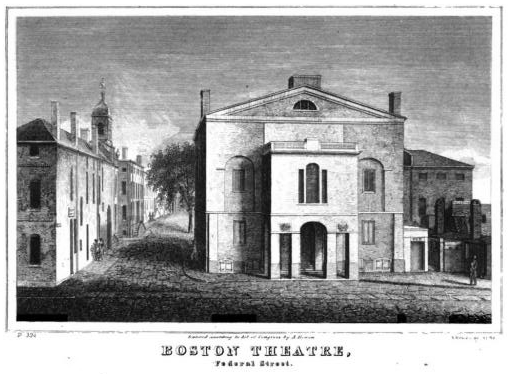
Federal Street Theatre, Boston

The Federal Street Theatre (1793–1852), also known as the Boston Theatre, was located at the corner of Federal and Franklin streets in Boston, Massachusetts, United States. It was "the first building erected purposely for theatrical entertainments in the town of Boston."

== History ==
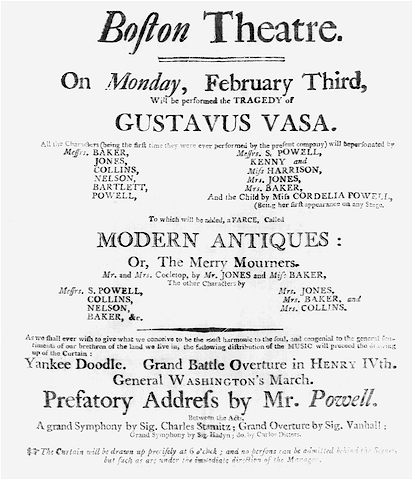
Opening performance, February 3, 1794

The original building was designed by Charles Bulfinch. It was "the first professionally designed American theater by a native architect." It occupied land formerly owned by Thomas Brattle, Edward H. Robbins and William Tudor. In 1798 fire destroyed the theatre; it was rebuilt the same year. The second building existed through 1852.

Management included Charles S. Powell (1794–1795); John Steel Tyler (1795–1796); John Hodgkinson (1795–1796); John Brown Williamson (1796–1797); John Sollee (1797); Giles Leonard Barrett (ca.1798); Joseph Harper (ca.1798).

Musicians affiliated with the theatre included Trille La Barre; Peter Von Hagen Sr.; R. Leaumont; and Gottlieb Graupner. Scene painters included Christian Gullager (1793–1797).

The British actress Charlotte Wattell appeared here in about 1811.

== Events ==
- 1794
  - Feb. 3 – "Tragedy of Gustavus Vasa"
  - Feb. – "The Child of Nature" and "The Agreeable Surprise"
  - April – "The Chapter of Accidents;" and "Midas," a burletta
- 1795 – Judith Sargent Murray's "The Medium, or Happy Tea-Party," debuts 2 March 1795. Judith Sargent Murray wrote the first two plays by an American, male or female, to be performed in Boston.
- 1796
  - March 9 – Judith Sargent Murray's "The Traveller Returned," debuts.
  - John O'Keefe's "Farmer," with Susanna Rowson
- 1802
  - A young Hawaiian called "Bill" performed in the pantomime "The Death of Captain Cook."
  - March 22–29 – Deborah Sampson Gannett spoke about her time in the Continental Army and exhibited the manual exercise with her rifle that she learned during her service. Each night, before her speech and exhibition, the theatre company performed a play. They were The Will, or a School for Daughters, King Henry the IVth with the Humors of Sir John Falstaff, The Way to Get Married, and The Grand Historical Drama of Columbus; or, American Discovered.
- 1832 – Shakespeare's Richard III, with Charles Kean.
- 1834 – Jonathan Harrington (ventriloquist)
- 1845 – Alonzo Potter gave his first series of twelve Lowell Lectures. The Theater was "filled to overflowing." His topic was on the "Psychological argument to illustrate the being and character of God."
- 1846 – James Sheridan Knowles' "Hunchback," with Charles Kean and Ellen Kean.
- 1847 – Alonzo Potter gave his second series of twelve "Lowell Lectures on the "philosophy of man," again to a full house.
- 1848 – Alonzo Potter gave his third series of twelve "Lowell Lectures to a packed auditorium.
- 1849 – Alonzo Potter gave his fourth series of twelve "Lowell Lectures to an "admiring throng."
- 1851
  - Macallister. "Soirees magiques.... Several new and attractive experiments including for the first time, the aerial handkerchiefs, and the flying watches"
  - Lucrezia Borgia
- 1853 – Alonzo Potter gave his fifth (and final) series of twelve "Lowell Lectures on "The Bible as the refining, elevating and improving instrument of humanity."

== Image gallery ==
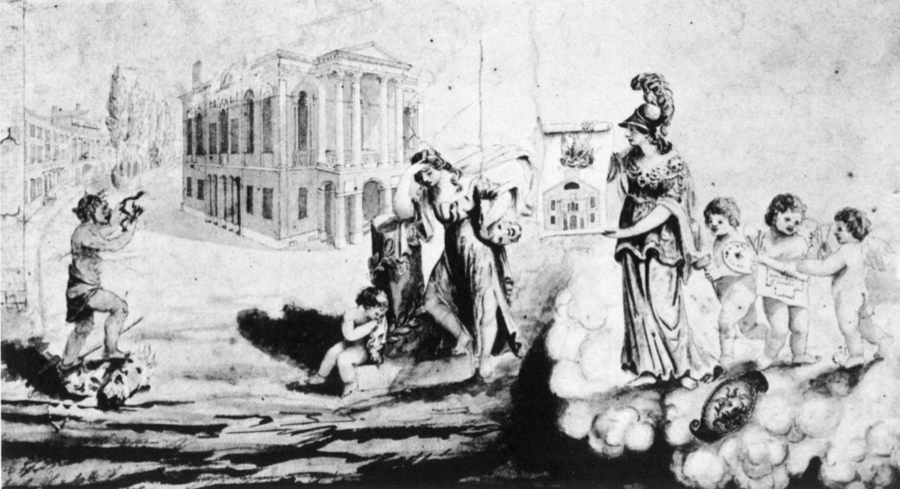
The Federal Street Theatre burnt in February 1798.

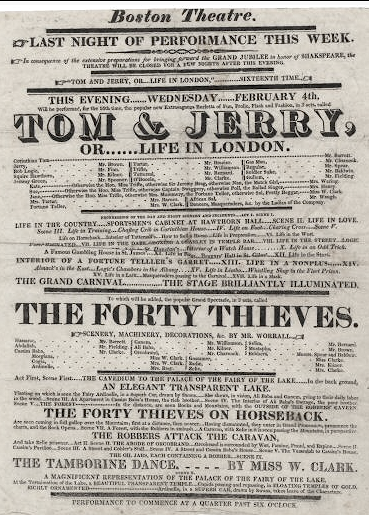
February 1824

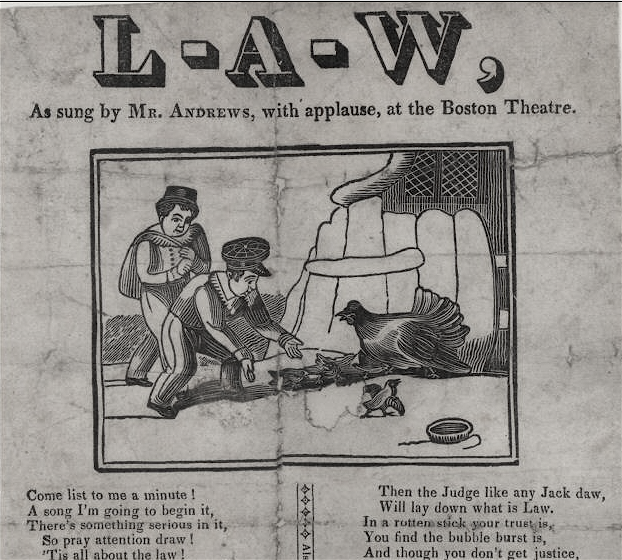
Detail from 1834 broadsheet of "L-a-w," sung by Mr. Andrews

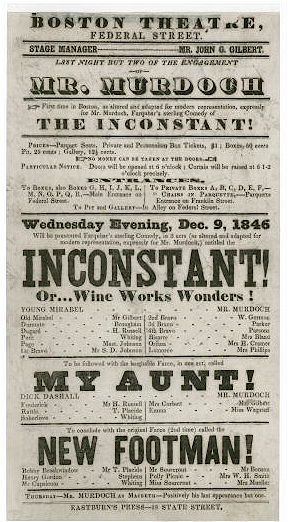
December 1846

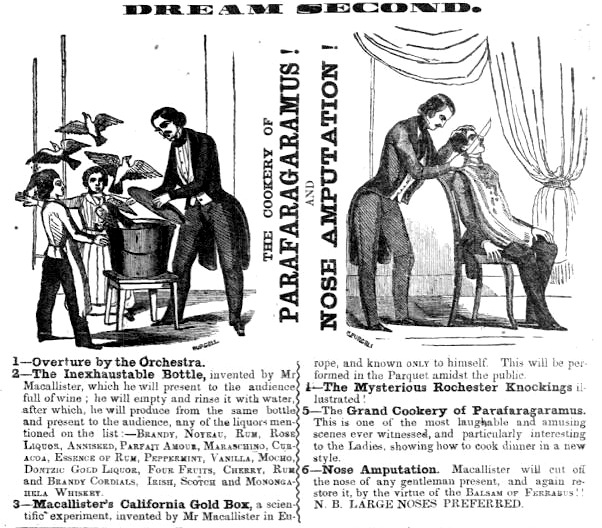
Detail from advertisement for Macallister's performance, November 1851
