= Georgina George =

American actress

Georgina George (Mrs Oldmixon)
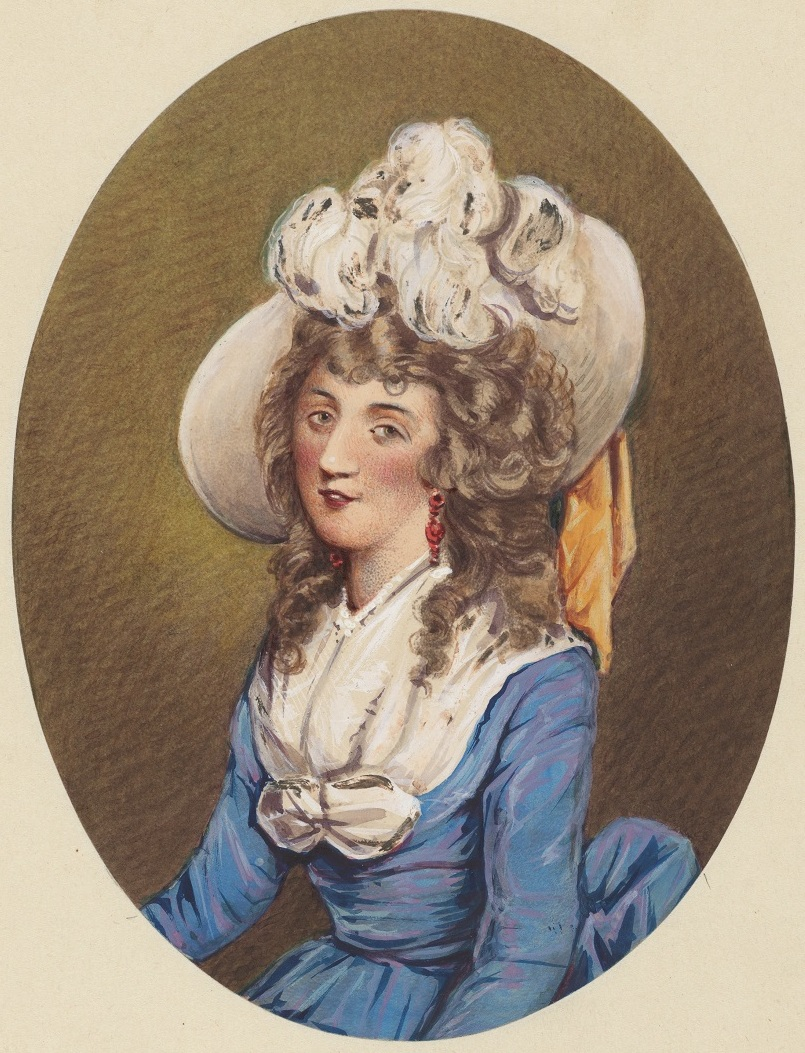
- Born: Oxford
- Died: February 3, 1835; Philadelphia
- Other name: Lady Oldmixon
- Occupations: Actor and singer
- Known for: Singing
- Spouse: Sir John Oldmixon

Georgina George later Lady Oldmixon or Mrs Oldmixon (b.? – February 3, 1835) was an English singer and actress, who sang in England, then emigrated to the United States, and sang there as Mrs Oldmixon.

== Oxford ==
George was born in Oxford on a date that is not known. She began four seasons of singing in Oxford when she made her debut at the Holywell Music Room, Oxford, on 11 February 1779. Her father appeared on her behalf during his 1780 dispute with the cello player G.Morello, who was annoyed that Georgina had not performed in his benefit performance.

== London ==
In 1783 she moved to London where she sang at the leading theatres. She sang first at Covent Garden, and then for three years at Drury Lane.

She moved from just singing when she took the role of Rosetta in Love in a Village and then sang in Comus and in Artaxerxes, all by Thomas Arne.

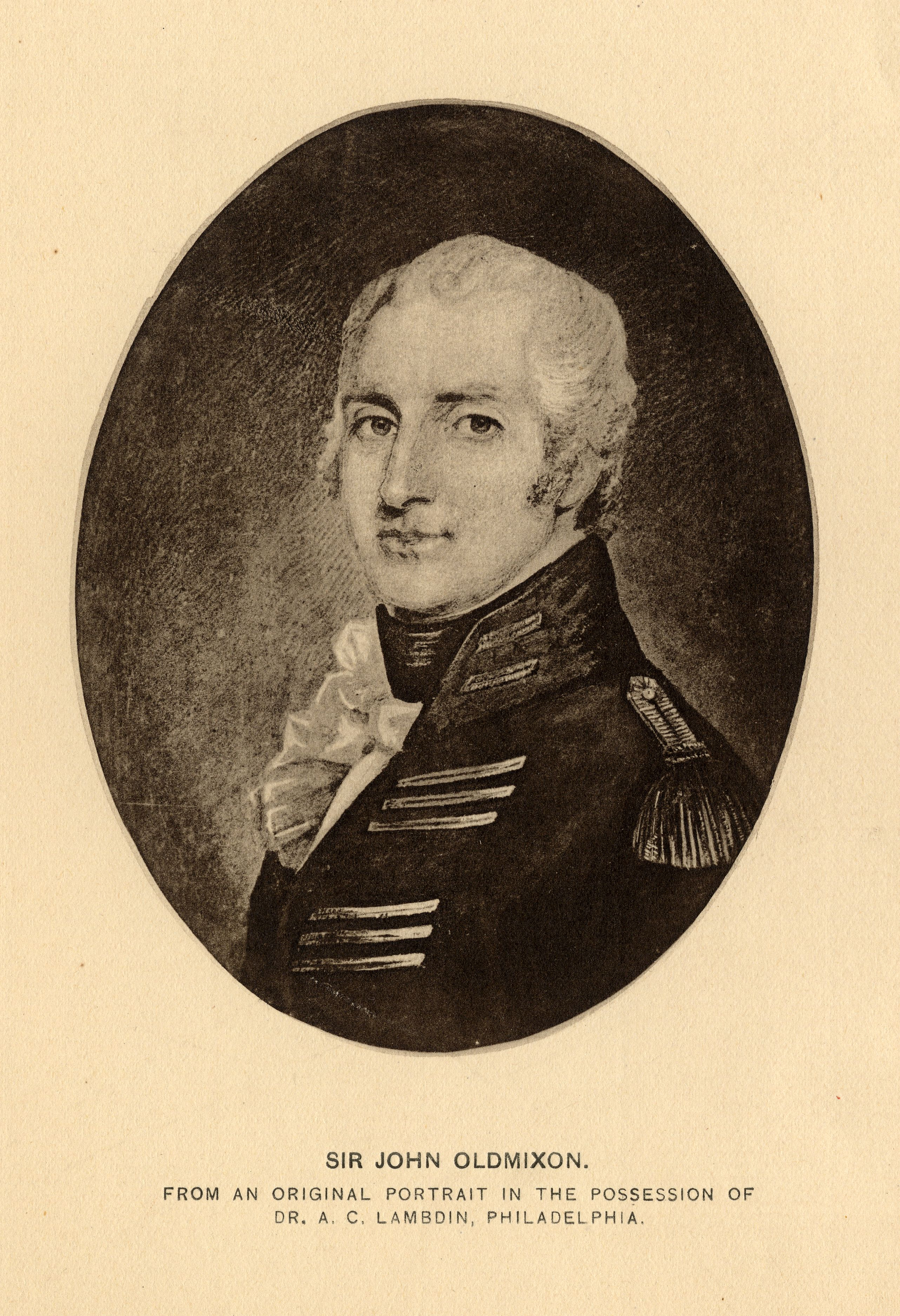
Sir John Oldmixon

During the 1787–88 season she was appearing at the Royalty Theatre in East London. She appeared in Apollo Turn'd Stroller which was notable because it was written by the fashionable army officer Sir John Morella Oldmixon. At one time Oldmixon had been a beau at Bath, where he took pride in having the correct number of curls in his hair. Details are not clear, but by 1793 she was reportedly married to him. In that year they were both short of money, and George was given an offer to appear in America.

== Philadelphia ==
On 14 May 1794 she sang in "Robin Hood" at Thomas Wignell's theatre in Philadelphia. The playbills for the Chestnut Street Theatre named her as Mrs Oldmixon.

They bought a house nearby in Germantown, where her husband grew vegetables and drove in each day with items to sell and carrying George for her performances. The marriage did not last, and her husband went off to live in Long Island.

George died in Philadelphia in 1835.
