= Theatre on Nassau Street =

Coordinates: 40°42′33″N 74°00′30″W

The Theatre on Nassau Street, or The New Theatre, was an 18th-century wooden building in New York City. It was probably the first purpose-built theatre in Manhattan.

== History ==
It was a two-story wooden structure, owned by merchant and former governor Rip Van Dam, and it opened on December 11, 1732, with a performance of The Recruiting Officer. The building was located at what is now 64–66 Nassau Street, between John Street and Maiden Lane.

In 1750, shortly after Van Dam's death, it hosted New York's first-known performance of a musical, The Beggar's Opera, presented by a London-based traveling troupe, Murray & Kean's. This was also the first record of professional actors in New York; previously all productions had been amateur affairs. In 1753, actor and director Lewis Hallam expanded the theatre, describing the new structure as "very fine, large and commodious." But only a few years later, in 1758, the building was converted to a German Calvinist church, and finally demolished in 1765 to be replaced by a more substantial building which remained on the same site until 1822.
