= Nancy Hallam =

American actress

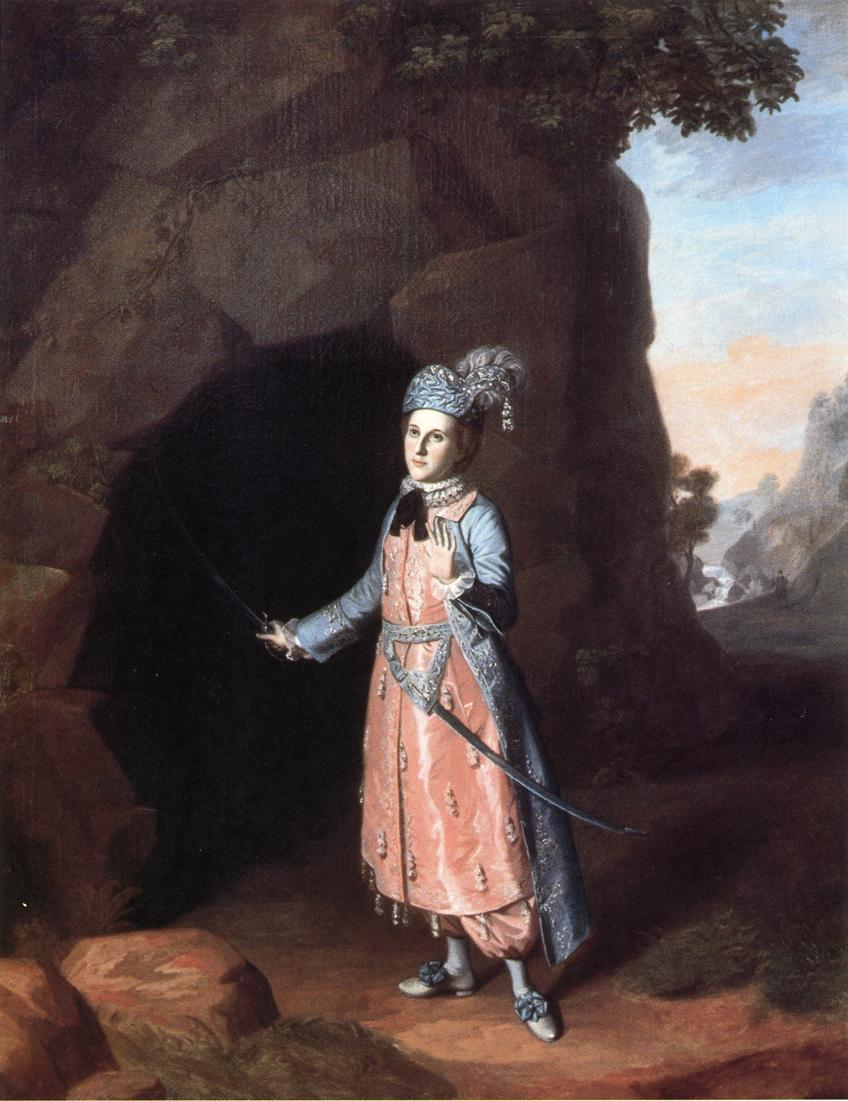
Nancy Hallam as Fidele in Shakespeares Cymbeline by Charles Willson Peale, 1771.

Nancy Hallam (died after 1773) was an English-born American stage actress and singer. She was engaged in the Old American Company, the first permanent theater company in America, and as such belonged to the first generation of pioneer actresses in North America.

== Life ==
Nancy Hallam was the niece of Sarah Hallam and a cousin of Isabella Mattocks. She was engaged in the American Company as a child. In 1760, she returned to Great Britain to be trained as a singer. In 1765, she returned to America with David Douglass after his visit to England to recruit new actors.

Hallam became known for her Shakespearean roles and for her ability as a singer. When Margaret Cheer retired and left the company in 1769, Nancy Hallam took over the principal female roles from her as well as from Sarah Hallam Douglass. She became a very popular actress and singer of the American colonial stage, and idolized on stage. Her likely most famous role was the crossdressing role in Cymbeline, which she performed the first time in the New Theatre in Annapolis in 1770.

She returned to Great Britain in 1773.

Nancy Hallam is the subject of a famous painting by Charles Willson Peale.
