= John Hodgkinson (actor, born 1766) =

American actor

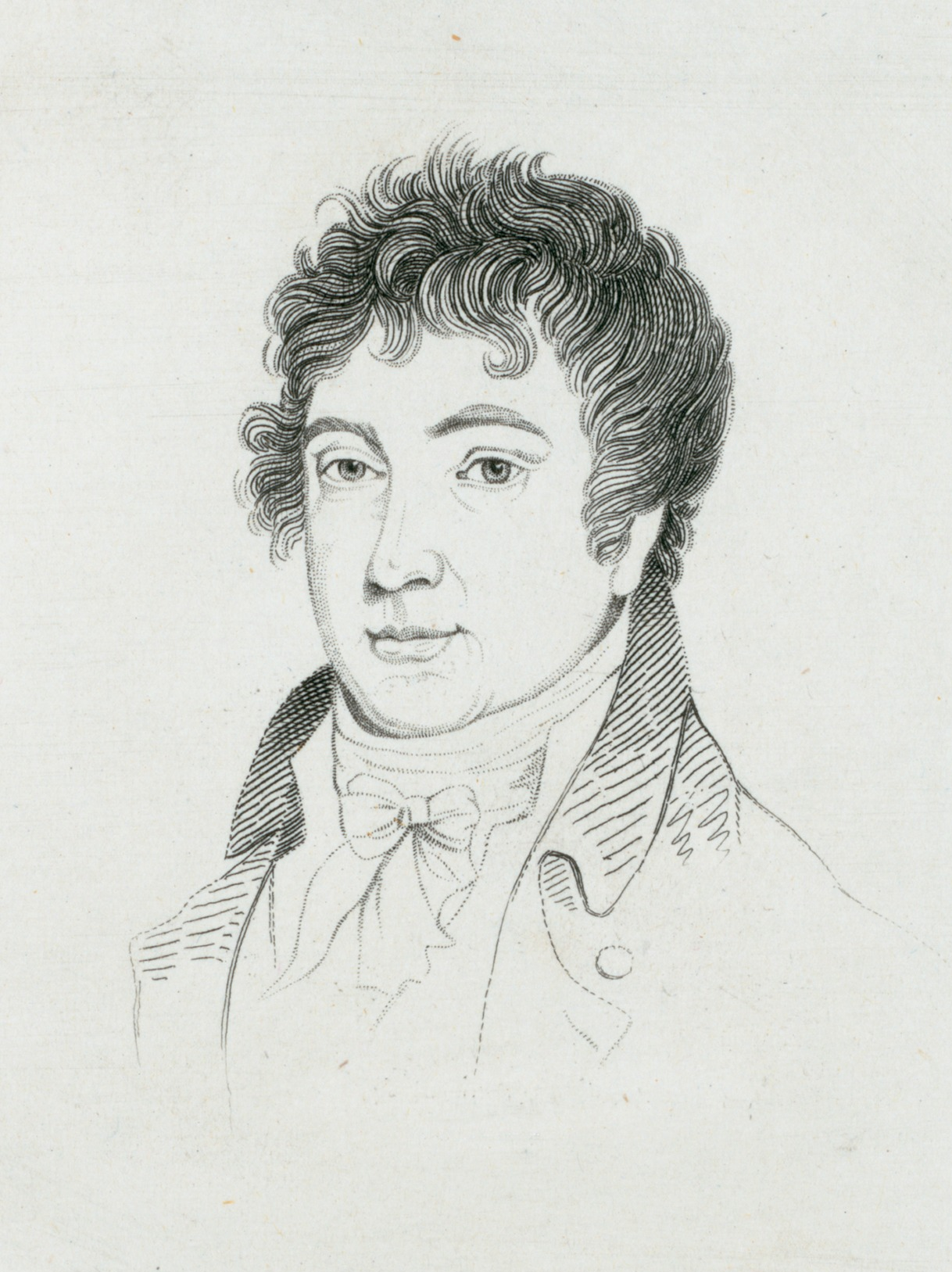
John Hodgkinson

John Hodgkinson (born John Meadowcroft) (1766 – 12 September 1805) was a well-known actor in the United States in the late 18th and early 19th century. He was born in England and came to the United States in 1792. William Dunlap and Hodgkinson managed the John Street Theatre together for a few years in the 1790s.

== Biography ==
John Hodgkinson was born in England in 1766. He came to the United States to leave his wife, first making inquires to New York theater managers Lewis Hallam Jr. and John Henry of the Old American Company for positions for himself and actress Frances Brett, whom he married shortly after arriving in America. He made his American debut at the Southwark Theatre in Philadelphia in 1792, played the role of Belcour in The West Indian.

Hodgkinson was "certainly the finest actor who had appeared in America up to his day." He became the leading performer in America for the next ten years, and in 1800, he and his wife became the highest paid actors in the country ($70 to him a week, and $50 to his wife).

Hodgkinson had a ruthless reputation on the business side, eventually forcing Henry and Hallam out of their theatre management positions.

Frances died of tuberculosis in Philadelphia on 27 September 1803, and was buried at St. John's cemetery in Manhattan next to her sister Arabella. John acted two season in Charleston, South Carolina, and died of yellow fever in Bladensburg, Maryland on 12 September 1805.

In 1897, St John's Cemetery was converted into a public park and only 250 bodies were exhumed. It is likely that his grave still resides beneath what is now James J. Walker Park.

== Career ==
John Hodgkinson, formally known as John Meadowcroft, was an American actor/singer who began work at 15 years old. He started as an acting apprentice in the English provinces in the year 1781. After discovering his interests in the arts, he decided to move to America and make a career out of acting. In September 1792, he moved to New York and began work. He quickly became known as one of the most versatile actors in the business.

By 1794, he became a co-manager of New York's Old American Company and worked along with Lewis Hallam. In 1796, William Dunlap bought a quarter of the company and began to work alongside Hallam and Hodgkinson. In 1797, Hallam resigned and left the business to Hodgkinson and Dunlap. William Dunlap worked as Hodgkinson's partner for the next 5 years. In 1798, Hodgkinson began to additionally manage the Boston Federal Street Theater.

The roles he played would vary between tragedy, comedy, and even opera. He was praised for his powerful voice and began his career as a singer as well. A year later, he withdrew from co-managing and began working under Dunlap at the Old American Company.

In July 1800, Hodgkinson began to perform alongside his wife and Mrs. Hallam at the Summer Theater. Owned by Joseph Coree, the theater was located on the Leonard street corner of Broadway. In this theater, Hodgkinson performed in many plays; such as "Five Hundred a Year" and "Columbus's Daughter." Hodgkinson died shortly after in the year 1805.
