= Thomas Wignell =

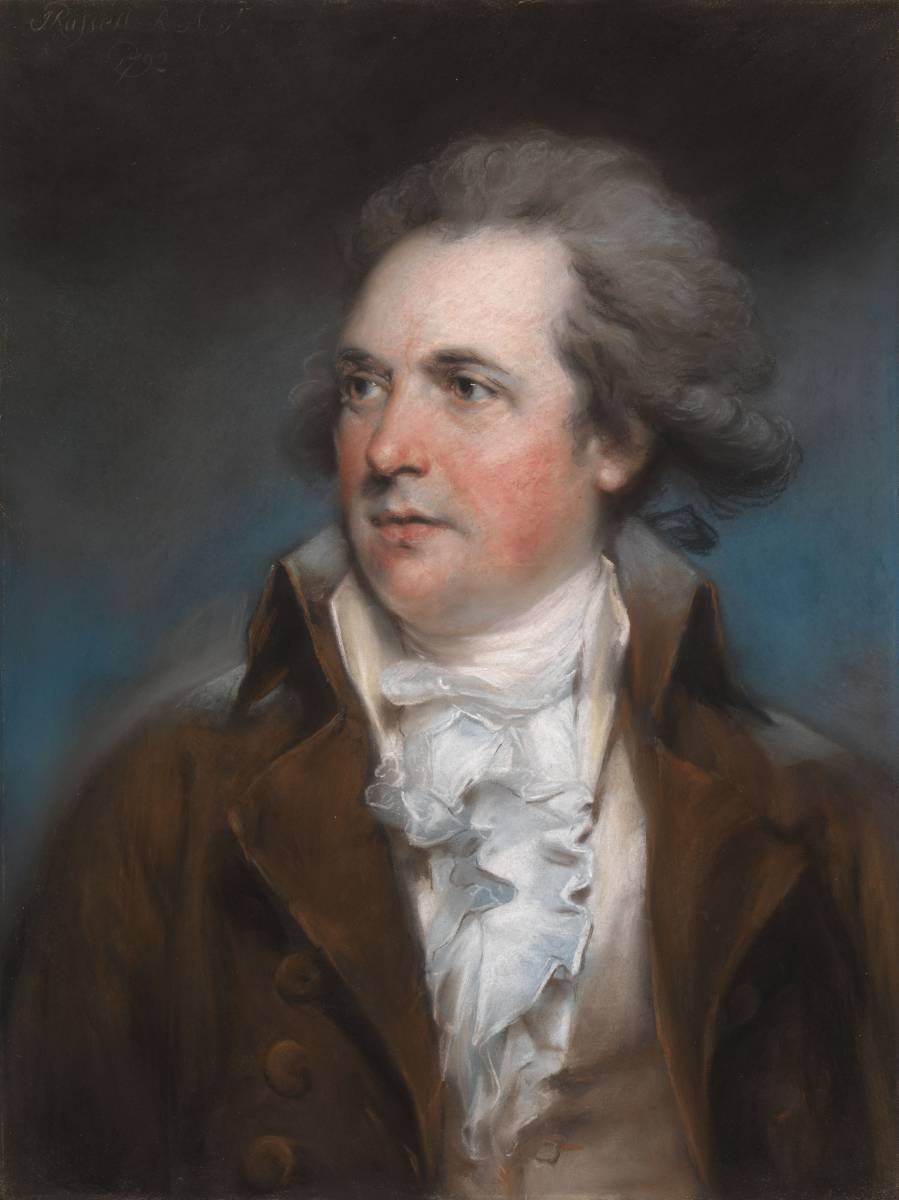
- Thomas Wignell, the "Atlas of American Theatre" (John Russell, painter)
- Born: 1753; England
- Died: 21 February 1803 (aged 49–50); Philadelphia, Pennsylvania, U.S.
- Occupations: Actor and theatre manager
- Years active: 1766–1803
- Spouse: Ann Brunton Merry

Thomas Wignell (1753 – 21 February 1803) was an English-born actor and theatre manager in the colonial United States.

== Early years ==
Thomas Wignell was born into a working theatre family. He was born in England to his parents John and Henrietta Wignell in 1753. His father John Wignell worked at Covent Garden Theatre. His first appearance was at The Covent Garden in 1766 where he played Prince Arthur in King John. He was originally apprenticed as a seal cutter but eventually left to become an actor. While acting in England, he was a member of Garrick's Company. Right before the Revolutionary War he came to North America in 1774 with his cousin Lewis Hallam. Wignell and the Hallam Company then left for Jamaica, where they stayed until 1785.

== Career ==
After performing in Covent Garden and then later in Jamaica he returned newly independent America. He then worked with the Old American Company at the John Street Theatre in New York City, New York; with Hallam.

He did quite a few shows at this venue and traveled with them often. But debatably the most important point of his career happened on 16 April 1787 in New York. It was the opening of the play The Contrast by Royall Tyler. The Contrast was a five-act comedy of manners. The play was the first play to be written by an American citizen and then professionally produced. One of the reasons for the plays success was because of Thomas Wignell in the role of Johnathan, the first stage yankee. The stage yankee became the first American stock character. He had American pride, twangy speech, terrible sense of fashion, and was ignorant to a lot of things the other characters in the play found important. There is a scene in the play that is famous for Johnathan describing the John Street Theatre, the theater that the play was being performed in at that time.

Wignell had other roles he was successful in; Darby in O'Keefe's farce The Poor Soldier was another comedic part Thomas became praised for. President George Washington even came to see The Poor Soldier in May 1787. William Dunlap, the most prolific writer of his time, wrote a short comic sketch entitled "Darby's Return" for Wignell to perform for his benefit performance. With Wignell in the title role, this sketch was a spin-off of O'Keefe's The Poor Soldier.

After separating from the American Company in 1793, Wignell teamed up with Alexander Reinagle and began to fund the building of a new theatre. Reinagle, a prominent musician at the time, started a fund-raising campaign to build this first class theatre located west of sixth and Chestnut Street to be named The Chestnut Theatre. Georgina George appeared there in 1794 in "Robin Hood". She was a leading singer and she had been recruited in London the year before. She appeared as "Mrs Oldmixon". The founding of the Chestnut Street Theatre in Philadelphia created opportunities for many new plays to take off.

Philadelphia became a capital for American theatre for many years. The Chestnut Street Theatre became Philadelphia's main playhouse and the first American theatre to be lit by gas. In the early 19th century, this theatre was where "many of the most important American plays…received their world premieres". Which under Wignell's and Reinalge's management, Philadelphia became the reigning theatrical capital in the United States for at least a decade. And with the help of Wignell, and the Chestnut Street Theatre, the city of Philadelphia would remain in competition with New York until at least 1826.

== Later years ==
In Wignell's later years he stopped acting and devoted his time to managing a number of different theatres. While back in London, Wignell recruited the popular female actress Ann Brunton Merry, who was popular at Covent Garden until her marriage and retirement from the London stage. They came to America in 1796, her husband Robert Merry died on 24 December 1798. She married Wignell on 1 January 1803. Their marriage was short lived, unfortunately because Wignell died about seven weeks after the marriage due to an infected arm. The city of Philadelphia then gave him an excellent burial at the Episcopal Church of St. Peter.
