= Kingston Theatre =

Theatre in Kingston, Jamaica

Kingston Theatre, was a theatre in Kingston, Jamaica, between 1775 and 1838. It was a major cultural centre of the island during its duration and had a good reputation also outside of the island, giving Jamaica a name of cultural sophistication, and it remained the main theatre of Jamaica during its history.

== History ==
The professional theatre had been performed in Jamaica for the first time in 1733, but the first permanent theatre company was not installed until the British Theatre Company of John Moody, which came to Kingston in 1746 and given its first permanent theatre building in "New Theatre" or King's Store on Harbour Street seven years later. This company, which was from 1749 managed by David Douglass, united with the Old American Company in 1758 and left for North America, and when it returned to Jamaica in 1774, the old building, having been in disuse for many years, was no longer regarded sufficient. The Old American Company successfully asked the colonial government for a new theatre building, and the Kingston Theatre was inaugurated in the Parade area in 1775.

Kingston Theatre was reportedly relatively small, but it played an important role as the island's main venue and as a part of the official representational life of the British Governor and the high society life of the Jamaican Planter aristocracy. It enjoyed success during the American Revolutionary War when performances were staged three to four times a week and the boxes of the theatre were leased by the members of the planter elite.

Old American Company left Jamaica for the United States in 1785, and the Kingston Theatre was used for concerts, circus performances, amateur theatre and other activities for the next years. In 1790–1803, it was managed by private owners. The building was expanded in 1814, and reportedly had 700 seats in 1821.

Kingston Theatre again operated as a theatre in 1812–1822, during which it enjoyed a period of great popularity. It became somewhat notorious for the frequent fights which occurred, some of them due to racial tension. The theatre operated again in 1827–29, and was employed for a number of different entertainments. In 1838, the building was deemed to be too decrepit and marked for demolition, but was destroyed by fire. It was succeeded by the Theatre Royal, Kingston, which was opened in 1840 and was destroyed in the 1907 Kingston earthquake.

== The Ward Theatre ==
In 1912 Charles James Ward built a new theatre on the site, presenting it to the "Mayor and Council of the City of Kingston" (later Kingston and St. Andrew Corporation), who named it the Ward Theatre in his honour.

The Ward Theatre hosted the weightlifting events at the 1966 British Empire and Commonwealth Games.

It was closed in 1982 for structural repairs, then in 1986 adopted by the Ward Theatre Foundation to operate and maintain, under a 25-year lease agreement.
