= Sarah Hallam Douglass =

American actress

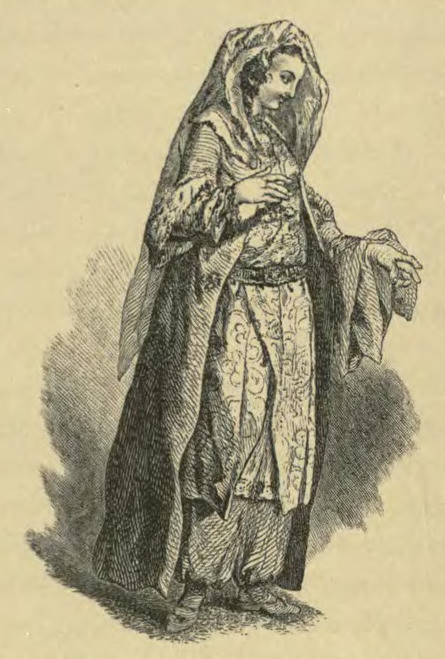
- Born: Sarah Smythies
- Died: 1773; Philadelphia
- Spouse(s): Lewis Hallam, David Douglass
- Children: Lewis Hallam Jr., Isabella Mattocks

Sarah Hallam Douglass (d. Philadelphia, 1773) was an English-born American stage actress and theatre director. She was known as Mrs Lewis Hallam and Sarah Hallam.

== Life ==
The details of her birth including her last name are unknown.

She was an actor married to Lewis Hallam, with whom she travelled to America to perform in his company in May 1752 on board the Charming Sally. They left a daughter behind and she became the leading British actress Isabella Mattocks.

They arrived in Yorkton on 2 June and by 16 June they were advertising in Williamsburg. This was the first permanent theater company in North America. Sarah Hallam, along with the other female members of the troupe, was thus among the first professional leading lady in North America. She performed principal female roles until she gradually left them to Margaret Cheer and Nancy Hallam in the mid-1760s.

Her husband died in Jamaica, where the company had gone to perform. After the death of Lewis Hallam she married David Douglass, with whom she formed the American Company in 1758. Her son by Lewis, Lewis Hallam Jr. became an actor in his mother and step father's company.

== Sources ==
- Davis, Andrew (2010). America's Longest Run: A History of the Walnut Street Theatre. Penn State Press. ISBN 9780271030531.
