= Maria Henry =

American actress

Maria Henry née Storer (died 25 April 1795 in Philadelphia), was an American stage actress. She was engaged in the Old American Company.

Maria Henry was the youngest of four Storer sisters (of at least seven) who were actors of the Old American Company; the eldest, Jane, died at a fire at sea near Jamaica; the second, Ann Nancy Storer, became known under the name "Mrs Hogg"; and the third was Frances (Fanny). Jane was married to actor John Henry (died 1794), manager of the Old American Company. Shortly after Jane's death at sea, Ann lived with Henry (and possibly bore him a son), and by 1768 was credited in theatrical bills using his surname. However, by 1775, they had gone their separate ways, she to Dublin to act, he to Jamaica. By 1788, Maria was probably Henry's wife.

Maria Henry first appeared in children's parts in 1767-68, and progressed to principal parts in both tragedy and comedy when she matured in age and training. At that time it was not a given thing for an actor to perform in different types of roles, as 18th-century actors often specialized in certain types of roles, but Maria Henry became known for her versability. She also performed singing parts and was an appreciated singer. She belonged to the elite of the actors of the colonial and early post-revolutionary American stage and was referred to as "the first primadonna of the American stage". She was however also a controversial figure; reportedly, she was at times in conflict with colleagues which attracted public criticism and refused to play the roles she was given if she did not felt sympathy for the part, which exposed her to public dislike from the audience; her alcoholism did also create disturbances in her performances which attracted criticism. Nevertheless, she retained her popularity as one of the stars of the American stage until her retirement.

In 1794, she and her spouse retired from the stage and settled in their house behind the theater in Philadelphia.
