= Lewis Hallam =

British actor (circa 1714–1756)

Leewis Kenneth Hallam
- Born: c. 1714
- Died: 1756
- Occupations: Actor and theatre director
- Years active: mid-1700s

Lewis Hallam (circa 1714–1756) was a British born actor and theatre director in the Thirteen Colonies.

== Career ==
Hallam is thought to have been born in about 1714 and possibly in Dublin. His father Thomas Hallam was also an actor who was killed by actor Charles Macklin in 1736 at the Drury Lane Theatre, allegedly over a wig. Many of his siblings were actors and one brother was a Royal Naval admiral. Hallam fathered a child Isabella who was baptised in London in 1746. He and his brother, William had only moderate success in Britain and they decided to ply their trade in North America.

Hallam arrived in the Thirteen Colonies in 1752 with his theatrical company, assembled by his brother William, who was also a founder of the Theatre company. Lewis had been an actor in William's company in England, but it had failed, prompting the North American venture. The new company landed at Yorktown, Virginia.

The Theatrical company began their performances in Williamsburg, then the capital of the Virginia Colony. Here they employed a large wooden structure, which was altered to suit its purposes. Allegedly it was so close to the woods that the players were able to shoot wild fowl from the windows of the building. Their opening performance was George Granville's The Jew of Venice, which Hallam billed as Shakespeare's The Merchant of Venice, on 15 September 1752. Music was performed by a soloist harpsicordist harpsichord. From Williamsburg, the troupe traveled to Annapolis and Philadelphia.

In 1753, Hallam took over the first theatre in New York City, the Theatre on Nassau Street, from 17 September 1753, to 18 March 1754. They moved to Philadelphia and opened The Fair Penitent and Miss in Her Teens on 15 April 1754. The group then performed in Charleston, South Carolina.

Hallam died in Jamaica, where the company had gone to perform. His widow, the actress Sarah Hallam Douglass (d. Philadelphia, 1773), married David Douglass, with whom she formed the American Company in 1758. Her son by Lewis, Lewis Hallam Jr., became an actor in his mother and step-father's company.

== Sources ==
- Davis, Andrew (2010). America's Longest Run: A History of the Walnut Street Theatre. Penn State Press. ISBN 9780271030531.
