= Southwark Theatre =

Coordinates: 39°56′29.4″N 75°08′59.2″W

Southwark Theatre, was a theatre in Philadelphia, founded in 1766. It played a significant part in the Culture of Philadelphia as well as the United States, being the first permanent theatre in Philadelphia and the first permanent theatre in the United States, one year prior to John Street Theatre in New York. It was the oldest theatre building in North America before it was demolished in 1913.

== History ==
The Southwark Theatre was founded on the intersection of Fourth Street and South Street outside of the city borders in the south of Philadelphia. It was founded by the American Company, who regularly used the building during their tours to the city for about thirty years onward. David Douglass, a member of the company, built it, and it became the first permanent theatre building in North America in 1766. It had a capacity of about 800 people.

On April 24, 1767, at the Southwark, the American Company staged The Prince of Parthia by Thomas Godfrey, the first production in the United States of a play written by an American.

The Southwark Theatre remained the only theatre in the city until the Chestnut Street Theatre was founded in 1794, which soon replaced it as the city's main venue.

The Southwark Theatre was no longer used for theatre by 1817. It was damaged by a fire in 1821 and repurposed as a hayloft and distillery.

== Sources ==
- Davis, Andrew (2010). America's Longest Run: A History of the Walnut Street Theatre. Penn State Press. ISBN 9780271030531.
- Dunlap, William, A history of the American theatre
- Seilhamer, George Overcash, History of the American theatre
