= Joseph Harper (actor) =

American actor

Joseph Harper (1759 – February 27, 1811) was an English-born and early American actor and theatre manager.

Harper was from Norwich, England. He came to the United States and was engaged in the Old American Company, where he was active for several years and considered a capable actor within 'light comedy' until he left the company after the death of his wife in 1791.

He managed the illegal Board Alley Theatre in Boston, until Governor John Hancock forced it to close sometime in June 1793.

He managed the Theatre in Providence, Rhode Island which opened in 1794. He also managed the Old American Company for a time. He also worked with Charles Tubbs, husband of Eliza Poe, to co-manage the Assembly Room in Portsmouth.

He also acted one season in Montreal. He was active in Freemasonry, having become a member of St. John's Lodge No. 2, now St. John's Lodge No. 1 A.Y.M. in New York, NY while performing at the nearby John Street Theatre.

Harper died in Charleston, South Carolina on February 27, 1811, and buried at the Unitarian Church Cemetery. His tombstone inscription reads:

"A Native of the City of Norwich, England. But for several years manager of the Theatre, Providence, R.I. Who died in this City on the 27th February, 1811. Aged 52 Years. He preserved through life the Character of a mild, temperate, and truly Honest Man."

He was married and his wife, known only as "Mrs. Harper", was a popular actress and highly regarded in the Old American Company for her roles as old women until her death in 1791, after which she was replaced by 'Mrs. Rankin'.
