= The Prince of Parthia =

1765 American play

- Original language: English
- Written by: Thomas Godfrey
- Genre: Tragedy
- Setting: Parthian Empire

Premiere
- Date: April 24, 1767
- Place: Southwark Theatre, Philadelphia

The Prince of Parthia is a Neo-Classical tragedy by Thomas Godfrey and was the first stage play written by an American to be presented in the United States by a professional cast of actors, on April 24, 1767, at the Southwark Theatre in Philadelphia. It was first published in 1765. It is set in the Parthian Empire in the 1st century A.D. during the Arsacid dynasty.

== Plot ==
The Prince of Parthia mostly follows the unities of time (happens in a short amount of time, usually 24 hours), place (happens in one place) and plot (one or few plot lines). It also has a five-act structure, and most of the characters follow decorum. However, with verisimilitude (or, the appearance of truth), the play is lacking. The idea that the entire plot line could happen within 24 to 48 hours is astonishing.

In the first act, Phraates, an officer at court, and Gotarzes, a prince, discuss Prince Arsaces’ triumphal return from foreign wars. But there is trouble at home. Vardanes, the brother of Gotarzes and Arsaces, is jealous of Arsaces' marital successes. Thermusa, Arsaces’ stepmother and the Queen of Parthia, wants to avenge her son Vonones who was killed by Arsaces for treason. Vardanes and his officer, Lysias, decide to use Thermusa’s vengeance to destroy Arsaces. Meanwhile, Evanthe, whose father, King Bethas, has been imprisoned, is in love with Arsaces, but Artabanus, the King of Parthia, has illicit feelings for Evanthe. The plot then moves into Act Two; when Vardanes and Lysias hear Arsaces tell Bethas that he loves Evanthe, they decide to tell King Artabanus that Arsaces is a traitor for sympathizing with Parthian enemies. And that is all; like most plays with a five-act structure, there are usually one or two acts that are just one scene. This keeps the five-act structure, but does not mess with the believability of the plot.

By the time the plot reaches Act Three, Thermusa is very angry because she knows King Artabanus is lusting after someone else. She tells this to Vardanes, who decides to use this to destroy Arsaces and take the throne of Parthia for himself. Arsaces asks for Evanthe’s hand in marriage in front of King Artabanus. Artabanus decides to let Arsaces have Evanthe because he promised Arsaces anything he wanted for being such an awesome child. Evanthe tells Arsaces that King Artabanus loves her, to which he replies that he loves her more. Vardanes then tells King Artabanus that Arsaces is a traitor.

Act Four takes a sharp plot turn, which causes some incongruities. Phraates tells Gotarzes that he overheard Vardanes and Lysias talking about how they killed King Artabanus in his sleep. Vardanes and Lysias plan on blaming Arsaces, while Phraates and Gotarzes plan on telling the general Barzaphernes about who actually killed the king. Arsaces has been accused of the regicide and thrown in prison along with Bethas. They bond over their fear for Evanthe’s safety. Thermusa enters the prison to kill Arsaces, but she sees a bloody ghost of King Artabanus, which causes her to “brain” herself against the wall, committing suicide. Barzaphernes appears and releases Arsaces. Together, they plan to get Vardanes and make Parthia right once more.

In the exciting conclusion of Act Five, Vardanes comes on to Evanthe, but she does not like it. Before Vardanes can hurt Evanthe, Lysias runs in and tells Vardanes that Arsaces has escaped and knows of Vardanes’ plot. Then, a huge battle occurs, pitting Vardanes, Lysias and all of their followers against Arsaces, Barzaphernes, Phraates, Gotarzes and their men. Cleone, Evanthe’s maid, watches the battle from a window. Cleone believes Arsaces was killed in the battle by Vardanes, but it was really Phraates. Cleone tells this to Evanthe, who drinks a vial of poison. When Arsaces, who has taken down Vardanes, hears of Evanthe’s death, he impales himself on Barzaphernes’ sword. In the end, only Barzaphernes and Gotarzes live.
