= Thomas Godfrey (writer) =

American writer

- Born: 4 December 1736; Philadelphia, Province of Pennsylvania
- Died: 3 August 1763 (aged 26); Wilmington, Province of North Carolina
- Occupations: poet, dramatist
- Writing career
- Language: English

Thomas Godfrey (4 December 1736 - 3 August 1763) was an American poet who died at age 26. He is known for writing The Prince of Parthia, the first play written by an American to be performed by a professional cast, as well for his tribute to Chaucer and Alexander Pope known as The Court of Fancy.

His father, also called Thomas Godfrey, was the co-inventor of the first octant, known popularly as Hadley's quadrant.

== Biography ==
Thomas Godfrey showed talent for artistic expression even at a young age. His father, a Philadelphia inventor, died when Thomas was only 13, and his relatives sent him away to a boarding school in England. Upon returning, he was apprenticed to a watchmaker in Philadelphia, despite his desire to become a painter.

Even during this apprenticeship, some of his poems were published in American Magazine.

After the apprenticeship, Godfrey joined the military, being involved with the Pennsylvania forces in an expedition against the French-held Fort Du Quesne in 1758.

Shortly thereafter, Godfrey wrote what may be the first play written in the Thirteen Colonies, The Prince of Parthia, which was published two years after his death, and whose first documented performance was two years after that.

He died of fever after a short riding trip.

== Works ==
- The Prince of Parthia
- "VERSES Occasioned by a Young Ladys asking the Author What was a Cure for Love?"
- The Invitation
- The Court of Fancy
