= Lewis Hallam Jr. =

18th-century American theater manager

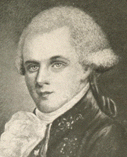
Lewis Hallam Jr.

Lewis Hallam Jr. (c. 1740 – November 1, 1808) was an England-born American actor and theater manager, son of Lewis Hallam, one of the pioneers of Theater in the United States, and Sarah Hallam Douglass. He was the leading actor of the Old American Company, at the time the only theater in America, and the manager of the same Company in 1779-1796.

== Life ==
Hallam came to America in 1752, with his family, as a member of the company of his father and uncle, the future Old American Company. His mother, who was also an actress, was a relative of Christopher Rich, a theater manager. This was the first professional theater in North America. They toured the colonies and performed The Merchant of Venice and The Anatomist.

Hallam first performed in Williamsburg, Virginia. He was the "earliest known American Hamlet and (played) Arsaces, the hero of the first professionally produced American play, The Prince of Parthia" in 1752.

In 1756, his father died, and his mother married David Douglass and united his company with hers, becoming the Old American Company in 1758. Hallam became the star of the troupe. He also assisted his mother and stepfather in running the company.

Lewis Jr.'s style was described as declaratory rather than realistic, but he was much admired and became known as America's leading Shakespearean interpreter. Lewis Jr. is believed to be the first actor in America to perform in blackface in 1769. He played opposite his mother in contemporary British comedies. In 1769, he performed "Dear Heart! What a Terrible Life I Am Led", the first documented white stage performance of an African American-styled song. In January 1775, Hallam performed in England, playing Hamlet at Covent Garden. This stint was his first and last performance in Europe.

Hallam continued to work in American theatre throughout his life, except for a period, during the American Revolutionary War, when the Old American Company left for Jamaica, where it was active until it returned to the United States in 1785. Hallam became the manager of the Company in 1779. The company took residence at the Richmond Theatre in 1886. The Company lost its monopoly in theatrical activity in 1790, Hallam resigned as manager in 1796. An account by John Durang in his memoir cited that Hallam was a sterling actor but an inactive theater manager.

Hallam died on November 1, 1808, in Philadelphia.

=== Family ===
He was first married to a young Jamaican actress named Sarah, only known as 'Mrs Hallam' in America, where she played minor parts in the Old Company: he brought her with him when the Company returned to America from Jamaica in 1758. The couple had two sons, Mirvan and Lewis D. Hallam. The former also became an actor while the latter studied medicine and settled in Jamaica. His first spouse died on an unknown date prior to his remarriage to Eliza Hallam.

== Legacy ==
The theater building at Prince George's Community College in Maryland is named the Hallam Theater.
