= William Dunlap =

American dramatist, painter, and historian

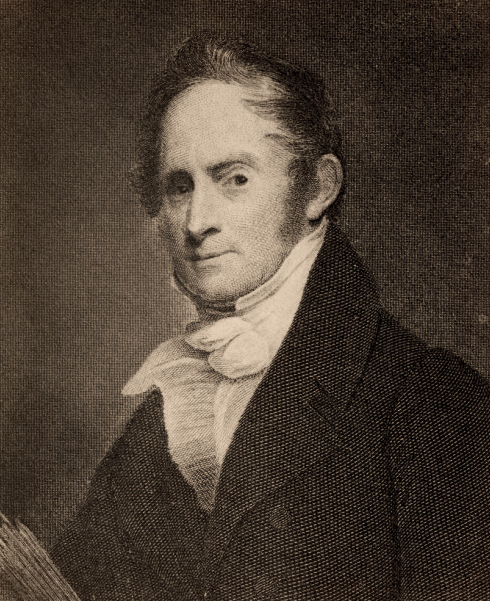
- Born: February 19, 1766; Perth Amboy, New Jersey, British America
- Died: September 28, 1839 (aged 73); New York, New York, United States
- Education: Studied painting in London under Benjamin West
- Occupations: Painter, playwright, historian
- Employer(s): Park Theatre, New York City
- Known for: Founded National Academy of Design
- Notable work: André; History of the American Theatre
- Spouse: Elizabeth Woolsey

William Dunlap (February 19, 1766 – September 28, 1839) was a pioneer of American theater. He was a producer, playwright, and actor, as well as a historian. He managed two of New York City's earliest and most prominent theaters, the John Street Theatre (from 1796 to 1798) and the Park Theatre (from 1798 to 1805). He was also an artist, despite losing an eye in childhood.

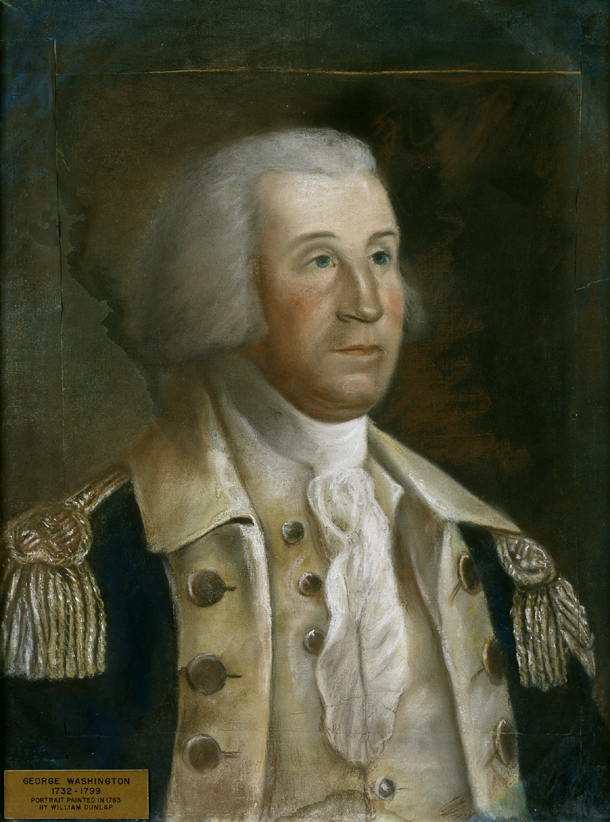
George Washington, painted in 1783 by William Dunlap during Washington's stay at Rockingham

He was born in Perth Amboy, New Jersey, the son of an army officer wounded at the Battle of Quebec in 1759. In 1783, he painted a portrait of George Washington, while staying at Rockingham in Rocky Hill. The painting is now owned by the United States Senate. He later studied art under Benjamin West in London. Another teacher was Abraham Delanoy, with whom he had a handful of lessons in New York. After returning to America in 1787, he worked exclusively in the theater for 18 years, resuming painting out of economic necessity in 1805. By 1817, he was a full-time painter.

In his lifetime, he produced more than sixty plays, most of which were adaptations or translations from French or German works. A few were original: these were based on American themes and had American characters. However, he is best known for his encyclopedic three-volume History of the Rise and Progress of the Arts of Design in the United States, which was published in 1834, and which is now an invaluable source of information about artists, collecting, and artistic life generally in the colonial and federal periods.

His plays include:

- The Father (1789)
- The Archers, with music by Benjamin Carr (1796)
- André (1798)
- The Stranger (1798)
- The Italian Father (1799)
- False Shame (1799)
- The Virgin of the Sun (1800)
- The Glory of Columbia, Her Yeomanry (1803)
- Memoirs of George Frederick Cooke (1813)
- A Trip to Niagara (1828)

In 1825, Dunlap was one of the founders of the National Academy of Design, and taught at its school. He published his History of the American Theater in two volumes in 1832.
