= Thomas Seward =

English clergyman and writer (1708–1790)

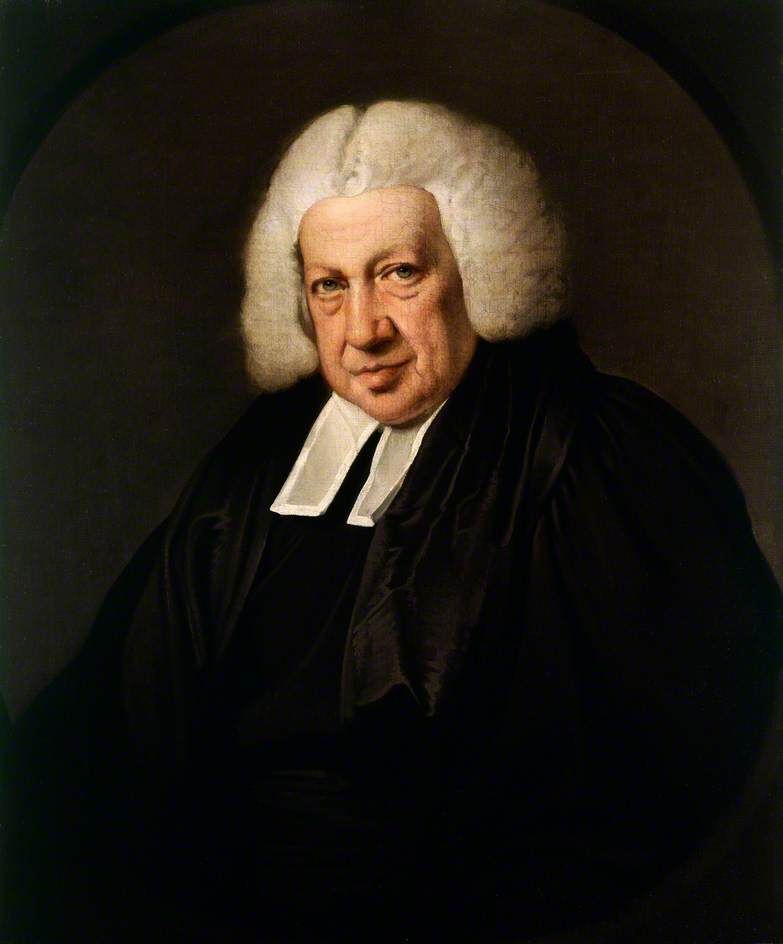
Reverend Thomas Seward (1708–1790), painting by Joseph Wright of Derby, 1780-1785

Thomas Seward (1708 – 4 March 1790) was an English Anglican clergyman, author and editor who was part of the Lichfield intellectual circle that included Samuel Johnson, Erasmus Darwin and his own daughter Anna Seward, amongst others.

== Life ==
Thomas Seward was the son of John Seward of Badsey, Worcestershire, and brother of William Seward, who became a Methodist preacher. Thomas married Elizabeth, daughter of the Rev. John Hunter, headmaster of Lichfield grammar school, and was the father of Anna Seward the author. His son, William Seward, became an itinerant preacher and was the first Methodist to be martyred.

=== Education and career ===
He was admitted a foundation scholar of Westminster school in 1723. He was elected by the school to scholarships at Christ Church, Oxford, and Trinity College, Cambridge in 1727; but after his rejection by both universities he became a pensioner of St John's College, Cambridge, where he graduated B.A. in 1730 and M.A. in 1734.

Seward became travelling tutor to Lord Charles FitzRoy, third son of Charles FitzRoy, 2nd Duke of Grafton, who died while on the tour in Italy in 1739. The Duke promised some preferment for Seward: he became rector of Eyam in Derbyshire, and Kingsley, Staffordshire. He also obtained the prebend of Bubbenhall in Lichfield Cathedral, though the date of his admission does not appear, and on 30 April 1755 he was collated to the prebend of Pipa Parva in the same church. He was installed in the prebend of Lyme and Halstock in Salisbury Cathedral on 5 June 1755.

Seward resided at Lichfield from 1749, moving into the Bishop's Palace in 1754, and was acquainted with Samuel Johnson, whom he used to entertain on his visits to Lichfield. James Boswell described him as a great valetudinarian. Seward died at the Bishop's Palace, Lichfield, on 4 March 1790.

== Work ==
His progressive ideas on female education, authoring "The Female Right to Literature" (1748), facilitated his daughter's career, although he was later to regret this. The Female Right to Literature and four other poems by Seward were printed in Robert Dodsley's Collection of Poems. Seward also edited, with Thomas Sympson, the Works of Beaumont and Fletcher, and wrote the preface, 10 vols. London, 1750.

== Selected publications ==
- Seward, Thomas (1748). The female right to literature, in a letter to a young lady from Florence'. Printed for J. Dodsley., in Dodsley (1765), Volume 2, pp. 309–315
- The Conformity between Popery and Paganism, London, 1746.
- A sermon, preached at Lichfield in 1756, entitled The late dreadful Earthquakes no proof of God's particular Wrath against the Portuguese.

== Legacy ==
Anna Seward caused a monument to be erected to her parents in Lichfield Cathedral. The monument was executed by John Bacon, and the verses which form part of the epitaph were the composition of Sir Walter Scott. In 1779 he was portrayed as the Canon in the novel Columella by Richard Graves.

== Bibliography ==
- Dodsley, Robert, ed. (1765) [1748]. A collection of Poems in six volumes by Several Hands. London: Dodsley.
- Thompson Cooper, rev. Bancroft, P. (2004) "Seward, Thomas (1708–1790)", Oxford Dictionary of National Biography, Oxford University Press, accessed 5 February 2008 (subscription, Wikipedia Library access or UK public library membership required)
- Barnard, Teresa (2004). "Anna Seward and the Battle for Authorship". Corvey Women Writers on the Web 1796–1834 (1 Summer). Archived from the original on 2 April 2015.
- This article incorporates text from a publication now in the public domain: "Seward, Thomas". Dictionary of National Biography. London: Smith, Elder & Co. 1885–1900.
- Letter from Thomas Gray to Horace Walpole, 1748, regarding Seward and the Dodsley collection
- "William Seward, 1702-1740". Christ Methodist Church.
