= Anna Seward =

English poet (1742–1809)

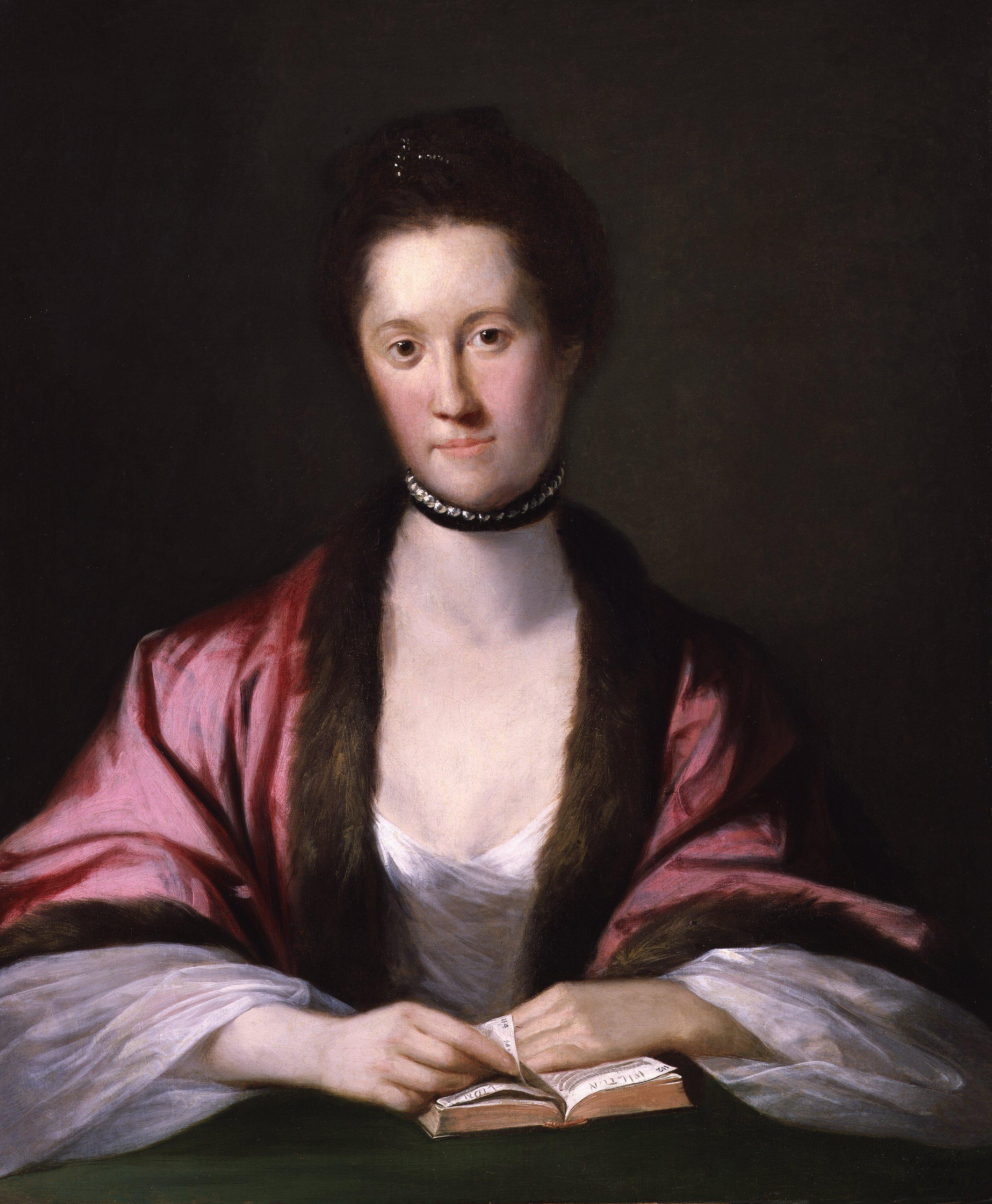
- Portrait by Tilly Kettle, 1762
- Born: 12 December 1742; Eyam, Derbyshire, England
- Died: 25 March 1809 (aged 66); Lichfield, Staffordshire, England
- Resting place: Lichfield Cathedral, England
- Occupations: Writer, botanist
- Notable work: Louisa (1784)
- Parents: Thomas Seward (father); Elizabeth Hunter (mother)
- Relatives: Sarah ("Sally") (sister)

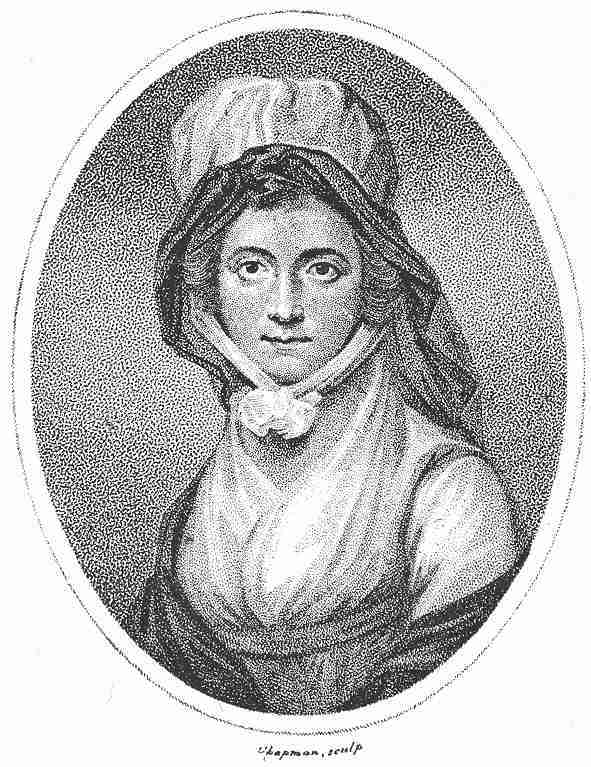
Anna Seward, engraving 1799

Anna Seward (12 December 1742 (Note: [old style: 12 December 1742.]) (Note: Often wrongly given as 1747.) – 25 March 1809) was an English Romantic poet, often called the Swan of Lichfield. She benefited from her father's progressive views on female education.

== Life ==
=== Family life ===
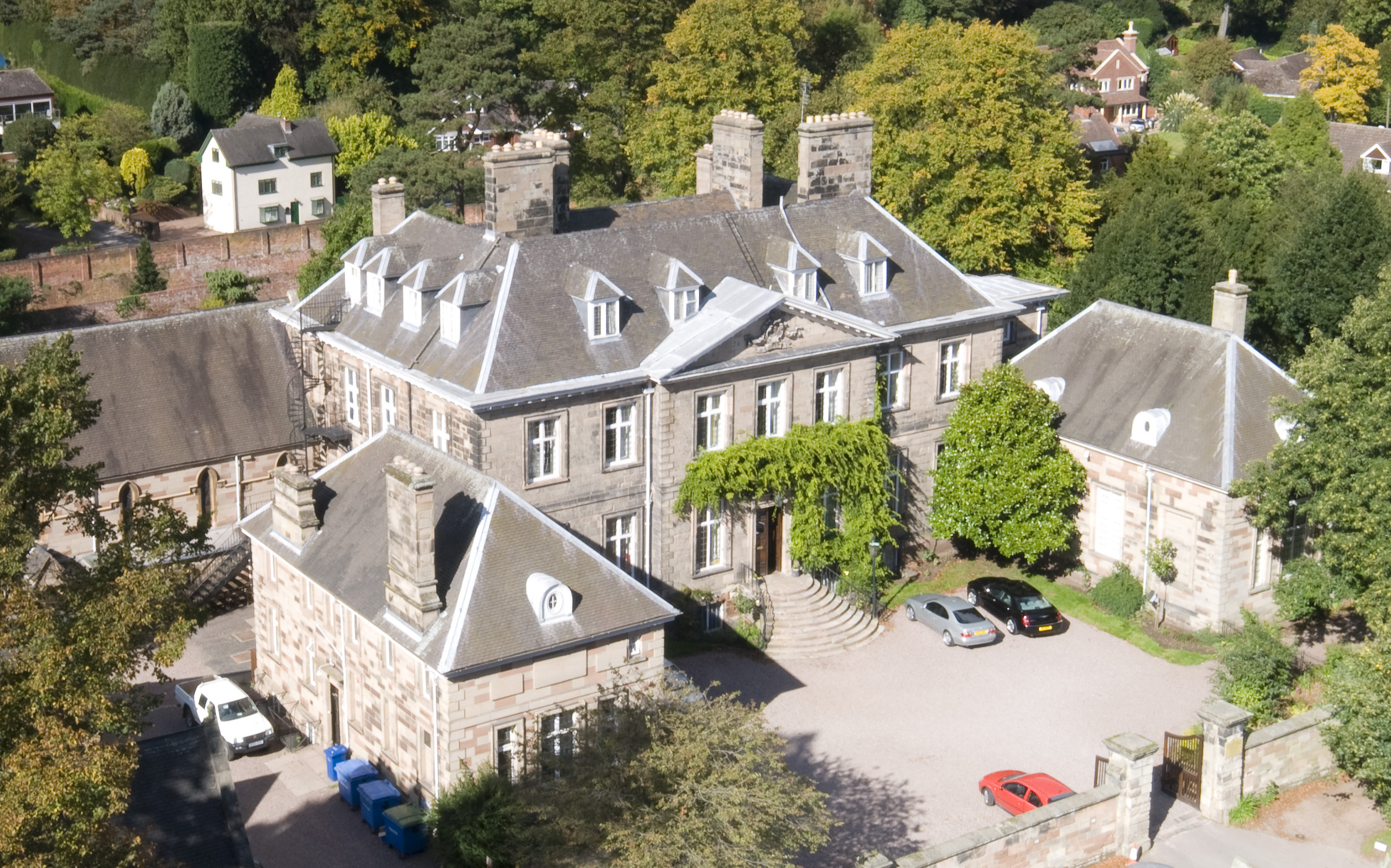
Bishop's Palace

Seward was the elder of two surviving daughters of Thomas Seward (1708–1790), a prebendary of Lichfield and Salisbury and an author, and his wife Elizabeth. Elizabeth later had three further children (John, Jane and Elizabeth), who all died in infancy, and two stillbirths. Anna Seward mourned their loss in her poem Eyam (1788). Born in 1742 at Eyam, a mining village in the Peak District of Derbyshire, where her father was Rector, she and her sister Sarah, some 16 months younger, passed nearly all their life in that small area of the Peak District of Derbyshire, and at Lichfield, a cathedral city in adjacent Staffordshire.

In 1749, Anna's father was appointed a Canon-Residentiary at Lichfield Cathedral. The family moved there, where her father educated her at home. In 1754 they moved into the Bishop's Palace in Cathedral Close. When a family friend, Mrs Edward Sneyd, died in 1756, the Sewards took in one of her daughters, Honora Sneyd, who became an adopted foster sister to Anna. Honora was nine years younger. Anna Seward described in a poem, The Anniversary (1769), how she and her sister first met Honora on returning from a walk. Sarah (known as Sally) died suddenly of typhus at the age of 19 in 1764. She was said to have an admirable character, though less talented than her sister. Anna consoled herself with affection for Honora Sneyd, as she describes in Visions, written a few days after her sister's death. There she expresses a hope that Honora ("this transplanted flower") would replace her sister (referred to as Alinda) in her and her parents' affections. (Note: Scott chose to open his collection of Seward's poetry with this poem.)

Anna Seward cared for her father in the last ten years of his life, after he had suffered a stroke. When he died in 1790, he left her financially independent with an income of £400 per annum. She continued to dwell at the Bishop's Palace until she died in 1809.

=== Anecdotes ===
Seward, as a long-term friend of the Levett family of Lichfield, noted in her Memoirs of the Life of Dr. Darwin (Erasmus) that three of the town's foremost citizens were thrown from their carriages and injured their knees in the same year. "No such misfortune," Seward wrote, "was previously remembered in that city, nor has it recurred through all the years which since elapsed." (Note: The three victims were Dr Erasmus Darwin, Lichfield town clerk Theophilus Levett, and Anna Seward herself.(Seward 1804))

=== Education and career ===
Anna showed a bent for learning from early childhood. Canon Seward, author of The Female Right to Literature (1748), held progressive views on female education. Encouraged by her father, Anna was said to be able to recite works of Milton by the age of three.

Her gift for writing was clear at the age of seven, when the family moved to Lichfield. The family home in the Bishop's Palace became the centre of a literary circle that included Erasmus Darwin, Samuel Johnson and James Boswell, where Anna was encouraged to join in, as she later relates. (Note: "Being canon of this cathedral, his daughter necessarily converses on terms of equality with the proudest inhabitants of our little city." (Scott 1810, Letter February 1763. Vol. I, p. lxxiii.)) Canon Seward's (if not his wife's) attitudes to educating girls was progressive for the time, but not excessively so. He was a poet himself, yet tried to curb Anna's passion for poetry, although she chose the composition of it for her own studies. Among the subjects he taught were theology and numeracy, how to read and appreciate poetry, and how to write and recite it, although these deviated from the conventional drawing-room accomplishments of the time. The omissions were also notable, including languages and science, although the girls could pursue them alone if they felt inclined. Nor was Anna unskilled in domestic matters.

Among many literary figures Anna Seward conversed with was Sir Walter Scott, who later published her poetry posthumously. Also in her circle were the writers Thomas Day, Francis Noel Clarke Mundy, Sir Brooke Boothby, Willie Newton (the Peak Minstrel) and Mary Martha Sherwood. She came to be seen as heading a coterie of regional poets, influenced by writers such as Thomas Whalley, William Hayley, Robert Southey, Helen Maria Williams, Hannah More and the Ladies of Llangollen. She was also involved in the Lunar Society in Birmingham, which would sometimes meet at their home. Both Darwin and Day belonged. Seward corresponded with other members such as Josiah Wedgwood and Richard Lovell Edgeworth.

Between 1775 and 1781, Seward was a guest and participant at a much-mocked salon held by Anna Miller at Batheaston, near Bath. However, it was there that Seward's talent was recognised. Her work appeared in the yearbook of poems from the gatherings, a debt that Seward acknowledged in "Poem to the Memory of Lady Miller" (1782).

=== Relationships ===
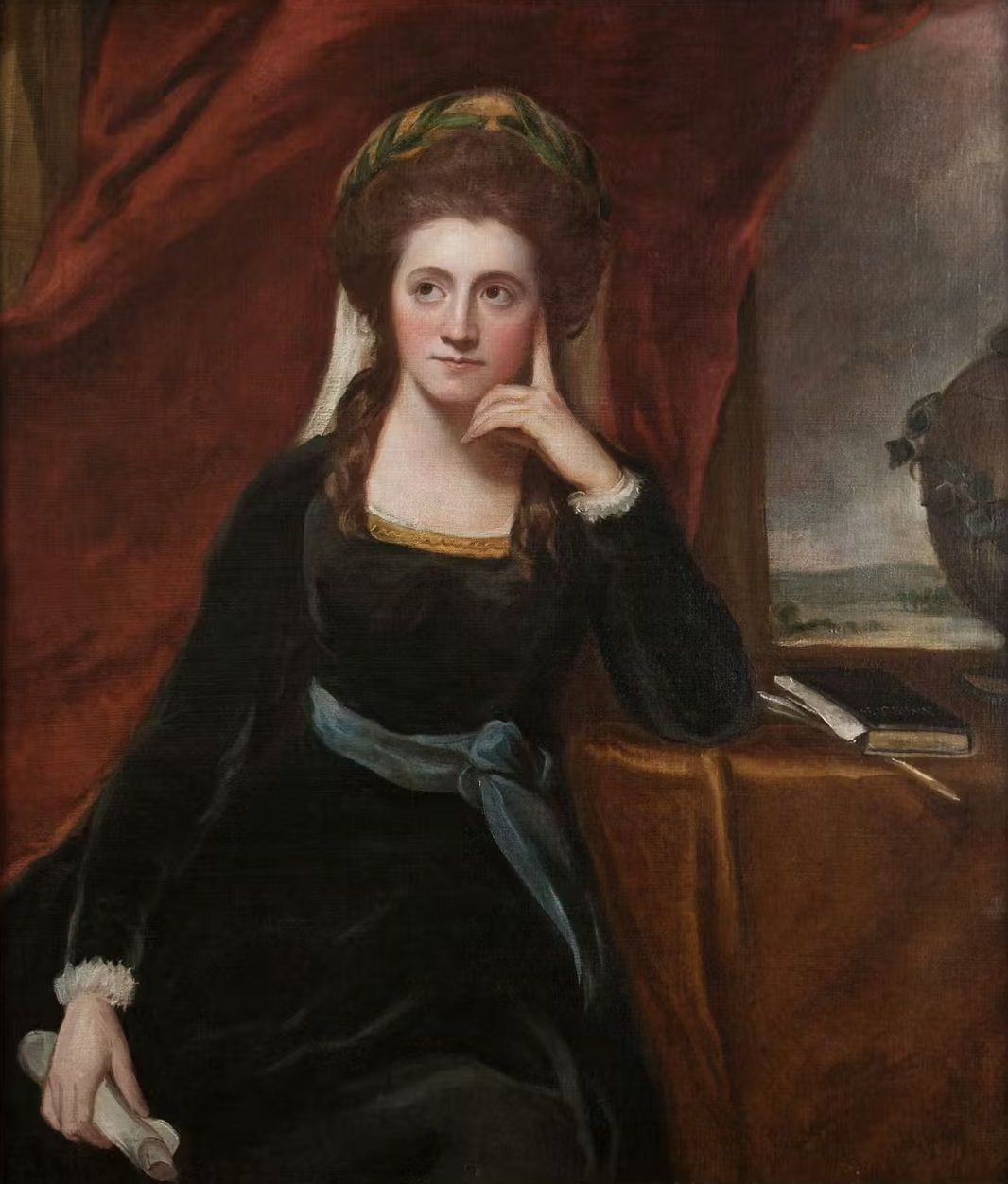
1782 portrait of Seward by George Romney

Seward remained single, despite offers and friendships. She was outspoken about the institution of marriage, not unlike her heroine in Louisa, a position later echoed in the novels of her step-niece, Maria Edgeworth. She shunned marriage and sexual love as inferior to the equality and virtue of Aristotelian friendship. She maintained friends of both genders, although seeking romantic relations only with women. In 1985 Lillian Faderman suggested that her orientation was lesbian, but there is little known evidence of the erotic or sexual in her ties and the term relates more to 20th than to 18th-century concepts of identity. Since 1985, Seward remains within the lesbian poetic canon, but Teresa Barnard argues against this, based more on examining her correspondence than on her poetry, while more recently Redford Barrett has argued for it, based on other sources. It is also known that Seward named her pet dog "Sappho" after the sixth-century BCE poet of the same name.

Much of the literature on Seward's relations focuses on her childhood friend Honora Sneyd: sonnets reveal her passion for her when they were together and her despair when Sneyd married Richard Edgeworth. Compared with the correspondence, her sonnets display more intense emotion, such as Sonnet 10 ("Honora, shou'd that cruel time arrive"), which describes feelings of betrayal. When the Edgeworths moved to Ireland, despair turned to anger, as in Sonnet 14 ("Ingratitude, how deadly is thy smart").

== Work ==
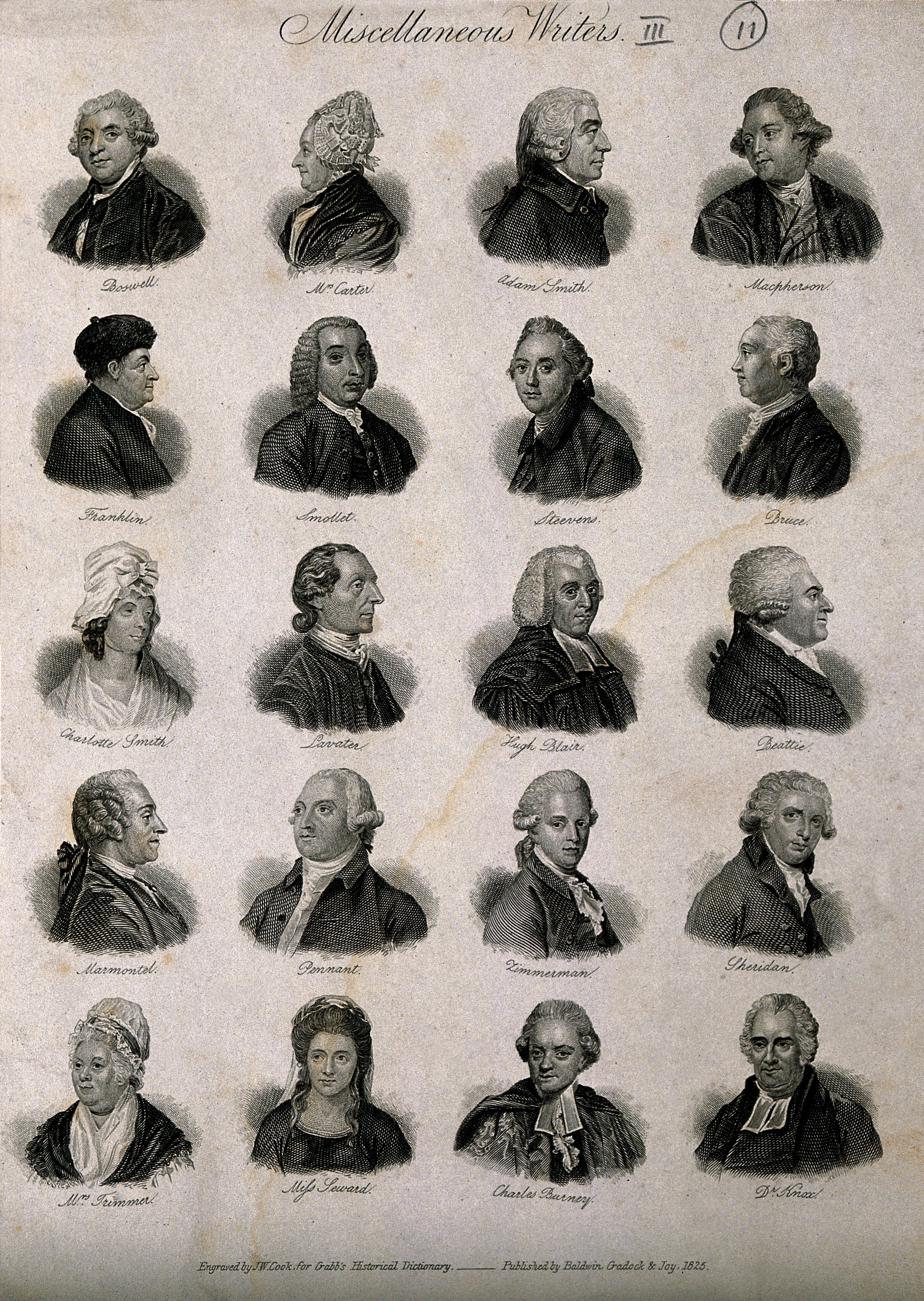
Anna Seward: bottom row, 2nd from left; Engraving by J.W. Cook, 1825.

=== Poetry ===
Seward began to write poetry early with encouragement from her father, a published poet, but against the wishes of her mother. When Anna was 16, her father revised his position, fearing she might become a "learned lady". Later she was encouraged by Dr Erasmus Darwin, who set up a medical practice in Lichfield in 1756, although their relations with him included frequent conflicts.

Her verses, which date from at least 1759, include elegies and sonnets, and a verse-novel, Louisa (1784), of which five editions were published. However, she did not publish her first poem until 1780, at the age of 38. Seward's many letters and other writings have been called "commonplace". Horace Walpole said she had "no imagination, no novelty", but she was praised by Mary Scott, who had written admiringly of her father's attitude to female education.

Several poems, particularly Lichfield ones, concern her friend and adopted sister Honora Sneyd, in a tradition described as "female friendship poetry". Seward struck a middle path in a period when women had to tread carefully. Her work could also be arch and teasing, as in her poem Portrait of Miss Levett, on a Lichfield beauty later married to Rev. Richard Levett. She contributed to Boswell's Life of Samuel Johnson (1791), but was less than happy with Boswell's treatment of her material. Her work circulated widely.

Authorship has been a continuing problem in assessing her work. She was known to suggest others had used her work as their own: "a charge of plagiarism must rest somewhere."

=== Correspondence and biography ===
Seward was a prodigious correspondent. Six vast volumes of her letters appeared posthumously in 1811, revealing broad knowledge of English literature and casting light on Midland literary culture in her day. Early on, in 1762–1768, she used an imaginary friend, Emma, to express her thoughts, writing 39 letters to her. She was seen variously as an authority on English literature by contemporaries such as Walter Scott, Samuel Johnson and Robert Southey. She also wrote a biography: Memoirs of the Life of Dr. Darwin (1804).

=== Science ===
Keenly interested in botany, Seward associated closely with the Lichfield Botanical Society (despite the name, composed of only three men: Erasmus Darwin, Sir Brooke Boothby and John Jackson) and published anonymously in its name. She was encouraged by Darwin to reject a conservative backlash to the revelations of Carl Linnaeus's sexual system of plant classification. This was seen as unfitting for ladies' modesty.

"I had heard it was not fit for the female eye. It can only be unfit for the perusal of such females as still believe the legend of their nursery that children are dug out of a parsley-bed; who have never been at church, or looked into a Bible, – and are totally ignorant that in the present state of the world, two sexes are necessary to the production of animals." (Note: Seward defends Erasmus Darwin against attacks on his Temple of Nature (1803) as indecent.)

This caution prevailed through most of the 19th century, typically from writers such as Richard Polwhele, in his poem The Unsex'd Females (1798), although she escaped his personal criticism, being considered to have a proper attitude.

== Selected works ==
Selected works include;

- The Visions, an Elegy (1764)
- The Anniversary (1769)
- Lichfield, an elegy (May 1781)
- Poem to the Memory of Lady Miller (1782)
- Eyam. (August 1788)
- Louisa, A Poetical Novel in Four Epistles (1784)
- Memoirs of the Life of Dr. Darwin (1804)
- Original Sonnets on Various Subjects: And Odes Paraphrased from Horace (1799)
  - Sonnet 10. To Honora Sneyd. [Honora, shou'd that cruel time arrive]
  - Sonnet 14 [Ingratitude, how deadly is thy smart]

== Legacy ==
After Seward's death, Sir Walter Scott edited her Poetical Works in three volumes (Edinburgh, 1810). To these he prefixed a memoir of the author and extracts from her correspondence. Scott's editing shows considerable censorship and he declined to edit the bulk of her letters, which later appeared in six volumes from Archibald Constable as Letters of Anna Seward 1784–1807 (1811). Her reputation barely outlived her, but interest revived in the 21st century, after some dismissive views among early 20th-century critics. Later feminist scholars in particular have seen Seward as a valuable observer of gendered relations in late 18th-century society, playing a transitional role in its principles and emerging romanticism. Her stance on the political, cultural and literary issues of the time likewise reflects the social responses to such issues. Kairoff sees her as "one of the — in a literal sense — ultimate eighteenth-century poets".

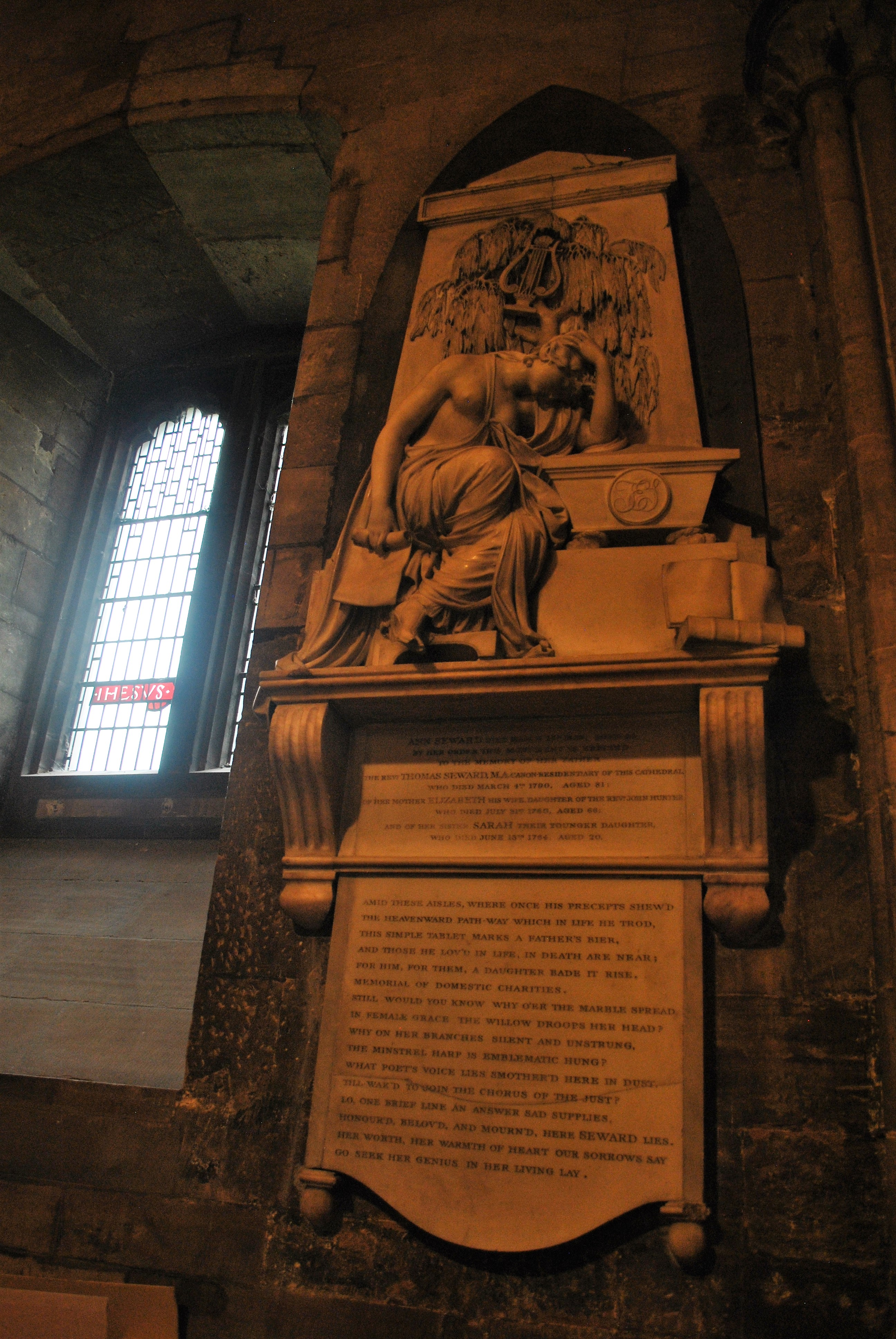
There is a plaque to Anna Seward (spelled "Ann") in Lichfield Cathedral.

There is a plaque to Anna Seward (spelt Ann) in Lichfield Cathedral by the entrance; Anne herself is buried underneath the choir stalls. The epitaph was written by her friend Walter Scott. (Note: See extracts from Seward's will in The Lady's Monthly Museum (Lady's Monthly 1812, Miss Seward's Will Wednesday 1 April 1812 pp. 190–195)) Seward appears as a character in the novel The Ladies by Doris Grumbach (1984).

== Archives ==
A collection of letters relating to Seward can be found in the Cadbury Research Library, University of Birmingham.

== Bibliography ==
- Bowerbank, Sylvia (2004). Speaking for nature: women and ecologies of early modern England. Baltimore: Johns Hopkins University Press. ISBN 9780801878725.
- Foster, Thomas A., ed. (2007). Histories of same-sex sexuality in early America. New York: New York Univ. Press. ISBN 9780814727508.
- Gottlieb, Evan; Shields, Juliet, eds. (2013). Representing place in British literature and culture, 1660–1830: from local to global. Farnham. ISBN 9781409419303.
  - DeLucia, JoEllen. Mundy's Needwood Forest and Anna Seward's Lichfield Poems. pp. 155–172. in Gottlieb & Shields (2013)
- Money, John (1977). Experience and Identity: Birmingham and the West Midlands, 1760-1800. Manchester: Manchester University Press. ISBN 9780773593428.
- Moore, Lisa L.; Brooks, Joanna; Wigginton, Caroline, eds. (2012). Transatlantic feminisms in the age of revolutions. New York: Oxford University Press. ISBN 9780199743490.
- Priestman, Martin (2014). The Poetry of Erasmus Darwin: Enlightened Spaces, Romantic Times. Ashgate. ISBN 9781472419569.
- Radcliffe, David Hill (2015). "Welcome". English Poetry 1579-1830: Spenser and the tradition. Virginia Tech.
  - Anna Seward
- Rounce, Adam (2013). Fame and failure 1720–1800: the unfulfilled literary life. Cambridge: Cambridge University Press. ISBN 9781107042223.
- Schofield, R. E. (1963). The Lunar Society, A Social History of Provincial Science and Industry in Eighteenth Century England. Oxford: Clarendon Press. ISBN 9780198581185.
- Stafford, William (2002). English Feminists and Their Opponents in the 1790s: Unsex'd and Proper Females. Manchester University Press. ISBN 9780719060823.
- Uglow, Jenny (2002a). The lunar men: five friends whose curiosity changed the world. New York: Farrar, Straus & Giroux. ISBN 9780374194406.
- Uglow, Jenny (5 October 2002b). "Educating Sabrina". The Guardian.

=== Historical sources ===
- Blackman, John (1862). A Memoir of the Life and Writings of Thomas Day, author of "Sandford and Merton.". London: Leno.
- Dodsley, Robert, ed. (1765) [1748]. A collection of Poems in six volumes by Several Hands. London: Dodsley.
- Edgeworth, Richard Lovell; Edgeworth, Maria (1821a). The Memoirs of Richard Lovell Edgeworth. Vol. 1 (2nd ed.). London: Hunter, Cradock & Joy.
- ——; ——— (1821b). The Memoirs of Richard Lovell Edgeworth. Vol. 2 (2nd ed.). London: Hunter, Cradock & Joy.
- Lysons, Daniel; Amott, John (1865). Origin and progress of the meeting of the Three Choirs... Commenced by... D. Lysons and continued down to the present time by J. Amott. To which is prefixed a view of the condition of the parochial clergy of this kingdom, from the earliest times. London: Cooks & Co.
- Scott, Mary (1775). The Female Advocate; a poem occasioned by reading Mr. Duncombe's Feminead. London: Joseph Johnson.
- A Society of Ladies, ed. (1812). "Polite Repository of Amusement and Instruction". The Lady's Monthly Museum. New Series. 12.

=== Literary surveys ===
- Batchelor, Jennie; Kaplan, Cora, eds. (2005). British women's writing in the long eighteenth century: authorship, politics and history. Houndmills, Basingstoke: Palgrave Macmillan. ISBN 9781403949318.
- Clarke, Norma. Anna Seward: Swan, Duckling or Goose?. pp. 34–47. In Batchelor & Kaplan (2005)
- Backscheider, Paula R., ed. (2002). Revising women: eighteenth-century "women's fiction" and social engagement. Baltimore, MD, USA: The Johns Hopkins University Press. ISBN 9780801870958.
- Backscheider, Paula R.; Ingrassia, Catherine E., eds. (2009). British women poets of the long eighteenth century: an anthology. Baltimore: Johns Hopkins University Press. ISBN 9780801892776.
- Behrendt, Stephen C. (2009). British women poets and the romantic writing community. Baltimore: Johns Hopkins University Press. ISBN 9780801895081.
- Brewer, John (2013) [1997]. The pleasures of the imagination: English culture in the eighteenth century. Chicago, Ill.: Univ. of Chicago Press. ISBN 9780226074191.
- Clarke, Norma (2004). The Rise And Fall of the Woman of Letters. London: Random House. ISBN 9781446444986.
- Fay, Elizabeth. "The Bluestocking Archive". English Department, UM Boston.
- Jennings, Judith (2006). Gender, religion, and radicalism in the long eighteenth century: the 'Ingenious Quaker' and her connections. Aldershot: Ashgate. ISBN 9780754655008.
- Lonsdale, Roger, ed. (1990) [1989]. Eighteenth century women poets: an Oxford anthology (Paperback ed.). Oxford: Oxford University Press. ISBN 9780192827753.
- Macdonald, D.L.; McWhir, Anne, eds. (2010). The Broadview anthology of literature of the Revolutionary period, 1770–1832. Peterborough, Ont.: Broadview Press. ISBN 9781551110516.
- Mark Ockerbloom, Mary (2012). "A Celebration of Women Writers". University of Pennsylvania.
- Sitter, John, ed. (2001). The Cambridge Companion to Eighteenth-Century Poetry. Cambridge University Press. ISBN 9780521658850.
- Stafford, William (2002). English feminists and their opponents in the 1790s: unsex'd and proper females. Manchester: Manchester University Press. ISBN 9780719060823.
- Staves, Susan (2006). A Literary History of Women's Writing in Britain, 1660–1789. Cambridge: Cambridge University Press. ISBN 9781139458580.
- Williams, Jane (1861). The Literary Women of England: Including a Biographical Epitome of All the Most Eminent to the Year 1700; & Sketches of the Poetesses to the Year 1850; with Extracts from Their Works, and Critical Remarks. London: Sunders, Otley and Co.
- Wu, Duncan, ed. (2012). Romanticism: an anthology (4th ed.). Wiley Blackwell. ISBN 9781118256572.

=== Anna Seward ===
- "People, Places, and Contexts in Anna Seward's Elegy on Captain Cook". University of Pittsburgh at Greensburg. 2012.
- Ashmun, M. (1931). The Singing Swan: An Account of Anna Seward and her Acquaintance with Dr Johnson, Boswell and Others of Their Time. New Haven: Yale University Press.
- Bailes, Melissa (2009). "The Evolution of the Plagiarist: Natural History in Anna Seward's Order of Poetics". Eighteenth-Century Life. 33 (3): 105–126. doi:10.1215/00982601-2009-005. S2CID 142761824.
- Barnard, Teresa (2004). "Anna Seward and the Battle for Authorship". Corvey Women Writers on the Web 1796–1834 (1 Summer). Archived from the original on 2 April 2015.
- Barnard, Teresa (2009). Anna Seward: A Constructed Life: A Critical Biography. Farnham: Ashgate. ISBN 9780754666165.
- Barnard, Teresa (2013). Anna Seward: A Constructed Life: A Critical Biography. Farnham: Ashgate. ISBN 9781409475330.
  - Grundy, Isobel (4 February 2010). "Anna Seward: A Constructed Life, A Critical Biography" (review). Times Higher Education Book Reviews.
- Clifford, J. L. (1941). "The authenticity of Anna Seward's published correspondence". Modern Philology. 39 (2): 113–122. doi:10.1086/388516. S2CID 161278303. (1941–1942)
- Dick, M. "A Portrait of Anna Seward". Revolutionary Players. Museums, Libraries and Archives – West Midlands. Archived from the original on 29 September 2007.
- Blanch-Serrat, Francesca. (2019). ""I mourn their nature, but admire their art": Anna Seward's Assertion of Critical Authority in Maturity and Old Age". ES Review. 40 (40): 11–31. doi:10.24197/ersjes.40.2019.11-31.
- Blanch-Serrat, Francesca. (May 2021). ""To 'leave my name in life's visit'"". Age, Culture, Humanities. 5 (5): 1–25. doi:10.7146/ageculturehumanities.v5i.130992. S2CID 248455965.
- Grumbach, Doris (1984). The Ladies: A Novel. Open Media. ISBN 9781497676695.
- Kairoff, Claudia Thomas (2012). Anna Seward and the end of the eighteenth century. Baltimore: Johns Hopkins University Press. ISBN 9781421403281.
- Landseer, Henry. "Possibly Anna Seward, after John Downman" (Portrait). National Portrait Gallery.
- Lucas, E. V. (1907). A Swan and her Friends. London: Methuen.
- Martin, Stapleton (1909). Anna Seward and Classic Lichfield. Deighton and Co.
- North, Alix (2007). "Anna Seward 1747–1809". Isle of Lesbos.
- Pearson, H. (ed.) (1936) The Swan of Lichfield. Being a Selection from the Correspondence of Anna Seward
- Roberts, M. (Winter 2005). "Anna Seward – 'The Queen Muse of Britain'". The Female Spectator, Chawton House Library. 9 (2): 1–4.
- Roberts, Marion (December 2010). Close encounters: Anna Seward, 1742–1809, A Woman in provincial cultural life (Master of Letters Thesis, School of Humanities, University of Birmingham). University of Birmingham.
- Roberts, Marion (2012). "Anna Seward" (PDF). Biographies of Women Writers. Chawton House Library.

=== Botany ===
- Fara, Patricia (2012). Erasmus Darwin: sex, science, and serendipity. Oxford: Oxford University Press. ISBN 9780199582662.
- George, Sam (June 2005). "'Not Strictly Proper for a Female Pen': Eighteenth-Century Poetry and the Sexuality of Botany". Comparative Critical Studies. 2 (2): 191–210. doi:10.3366/ccs.2005.2.2.191.
- George, Sam (30 January 2014). "Carl Linnaeus, Erasmus Darwin and Anna Seward: Botanical Poetry and Female Education". Science & Education. 23 (3): 673–694. Bibcode:2014Sc&Ed..23..673G. doi:10.1007/s11191-014-9677-y. S2CID 142994653.
- Shteir, Ann B. (1996). Cultivating women, cultivating science: Flora's daughters and botany in England, 1760-1860. Baltimore: Johns Hopkins University Press. ISBN 978-0-8018-6175-8.

=== Sexuality ===
- Barrett, Redfern Jon (2012). ""My Stand": Queer Identities in the Poetry of Anna Seward and Thomas Gray". Gender Forum (39). Archived from the original on 2 April 2015.
- Castle, Terry, ed. (2003). The literature of lesbianism: a historical anthology from Ariosto to Stonewall. New York: Columbia University Press. ISBN 9780231125109.
- Faderman, Lillian (1985). Surpassing the love of men: romantic friendship and love between women from the Renaissance to the present. London: Women's Press. ISBN 9780704339774.
- Summers, Claude J., ed. (2013) [2002]. The gay and lesbian literary heritage: a reader's companion to the writers and their works, from antiquity to the present (2 ed.). Abingdon: Routledge. ISBN 9781135303990.

=== Works by Seward ===
- Constable, Archibald, ed. (1811). Letters of Anna Seward: written between the years 1784 and 1807 (6 vols.). Edinburgh: Ramsay.
  - Volume 1
  - Volume 2
  - Volume 3
  - Volume 4
  - Volume 5
  - Volume 6
- Heiland, D. (1992). "Swan songs: the correspondence of Anna Seward and James Boswell". Modern Philology. 90 (3): 381–91. doi:10.1086/392085. S2CID 162041058. (1992–1993)
- Moore, Lisa L., ed. (2015). The Collected Poems of Anna Seward (forthcoming July, 2 volumes). Pickering and Chatto. ISBN 978-1848935631.
- Scott, Walter, ed. (1810). The Poetical Works of Anna Seward with Extracts from her Literary Correspondence (3 vols.). Edinburgh: James Ballantyne.
  - Volume 1
  - Volume 2
  - Volume 3
- Seward, Anna (1804). Memoirs of the Life of Dr. Darwin: Chiefly During His Residence in Lichfield: With Anecdotes of His Friends, and Criticisms on His Writing. Philadelphia: W. M. Poyntell.

=== Reference materials ===
- This article incorporates text from a publication now in the public domain: Chisholm, Hugh, ed. (1911). "Seward, Anna". Encyclopædia Britannica. Vol. 24 (11th ed.). Cambridge University Press. p. 733.
- Bowerbank, S. "Seward, Anna (1742–1809)". Oxford Dictionary of National Biography (online ed.). Oxford University Press. doi:10.1093/ref:odnb/25135. (Subscription, Wikipedia Library access or UK public library membership required.)
- Bancroft, Pat. "Seward, Thomas (1708–1790)". Oxford Dictionary of National Biography (online ed.). Oxford University Press. doi:10.1093/ref:odnb/25136. (Subscription, Wikipedia Library access or UK public library membership required.)
