= Samantha George =

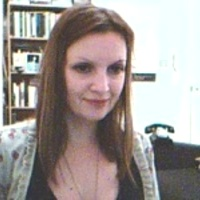
- Education: University of York
- Known for: Eighteenth century studies History of science Feminist botany Vampire literature
- Scientific career
- Fields: English literature
- Workplaces: University of Hertfordshire

Dr Samantha George is a Senior Lecturer in Literature in the Social Sciences, Arts & Humanities Research Institute at the University of Hertfordshire. She completed a PhD at the University of York in 2004, then taught in the Department of English Literature at Sheffield University till taking up her post at Hertfordshire in 2007. She is known for her research on eighteenth century literature and science with a particular emphasis on the role of women and botany.

She is also known for her work on Gothic and vampire literature and culture, and is the convener of the 'Open Graves, Open Minds: Vampires and the Undead in Modern Culture' (OGOM) research project at the University of Hertfordshire. In 2010, she organized the first Open Graves, Open Minds: Vampires and the Undead in Modern Culture conference, which achieved international coverage. In 2012 a symposium to mark the centenary of Bram Stoker's death was held.

In the field of feminist botany she is best known for her book Botany, sexuality, and women's writing 1760-1830 : from modest shoot to forward plant (2007), following in the steps of Londa Schiebinger and Ann Shteir in the field of gender and science, detailing the exclusion of women from botany after Linnaeus' classification was published in English (1783–1785), because the sexual reproduction of plants was considered harmful to 'female modesty'. Since then she has continued to research and publish on the intersections of literature, women and science, and in particular botany.

She has been Reviews Editor for Literature for the Journal of Eighteenth Century Studies. Membership of learned societies include the British Society of Literature and Science, the British Association of Romantic Studies, the British Society for Eighteenth-Century Studies and the International Gothic Association. Dr George publishes under the pen name of Sam George.

== Publications ==
Select publications include;

2015

- George, S. The Poetry of Erasmus Darwin. The Encyclopedia of British Literature 1660-1789. Day, G. & Lynch, J. (eds.). Wiley Blackwell

2014

- George, S. Carl Linnaeus, Erasmus Darwin and Anna Seward: Botanical Poetry and Female Education Mar 2014 In : Science and Education. 23, 3, p. 673-694 22 p.
- George, S. Girlhood's Tender Shoots: Education, Sexuality and Natural Science in Juvenile Literature for Girls 1760-1840 Pickering and Chatto.
- George, S. Teaching Vampire Literature: Blood and Gore in the Academy In : Gothic Studies. Forthcoming
- George, S. The Tulip: A Cultural History Reaktion Books.

2013

- George, S. He make in the mirror no reflect': undead aesthetics and mechanical reproduction -'Dorian Gray', 'Dracula', and David Reed's 'vampire painting 1 Dec 2013 Open Graves, Open Minds: Representations of Vampires and the Undead from the Enlightenment to the Present Day George, S. & Hughes, B. (eds.). Manchester: University of Manchester Press, p. 56-78 22 p.
- George, S. Foreword Dec 2013 The Vampire Goes to College: Essays on Teaching with the Undead. Nevarez, L. A. (ed.). New Jersey: McFarland
- George, S. (ed.) & Hughes, B. (ed.) Open Graves, Open Minds: Representations of Vampires and the Undead from the Enlightenment to the Present Day University of Manchester Press. 320 p.
- George, S. Sam George In Conversation With Sir Christopher Frayling Jul 2013 Misdirect Movies. Rimmer, J. & Bracey, A. (eds.). Manchester: Cornerhouse Publications, p. 60-67 7 p.
- George, S. & Hughes, B. Introduction: undead reflections: the sympathetic vampire and its monstrous other May 2013 In : Gothic Studies. 15, 1, p. 1-7
- George, S. (ed.) & Hughes, B. (ed.) Open Graves, Open Minds: Vampires and the Undead in Modern Culture May 2013 In : Gothic Studies. 15, 1
- George, S. 'Not Strictly Proper for A Female Pen': Anna Seward Nineteenth-Century Literary Criticism. Gale

2011

- George, S. & Martin, A. (eds.) Botanising Women: Transmission, Translation and European Exchange Oct 2011 Special Issue: Women and Notany. Journal of Literature and Science 4: 1
- George, S. Epistolary Exchange: the Familiar Letter and the Female Botanist, 1760-1820 Oct 2011 In : Journal of Literature and Science. 4, 1, p. 12-29 18 p.1
- George, S. & Martin, A. E. Introduction. Botanising Women: Transmission, Translation and European Exchange In : Journal of Literature and Science. 4, 1, p. 1-11

2010

- George, S. Animated beings: enlightenment entomology for girls Dec 2010 In : British Journal for Eighteenth-Century Studies. 33, 4, p. 487-505 19 p.

2007

- George, Sam (2007). Botany, sexuality, and women's writing 1760-1830 : from modest shoot to forward plant. Manchester: Manchester University Press. ISBN 9780719076978.

2006

- George, S. Cultivating the Botanical Woman: Rousseau, Wakefield and the Instruction of Ladies in Botany In : Zeitschrift fur Padagogische Historiographie. 12, 1, p. 3-11

2005

- George, S. 'Not Strictly Proper For A Female Pen': Eighteenth-Century Poetry and the Sexuality of Botany In : Comparative Critical Studies. 2, 2, p. 191-210
- George, S. Linnaeus in letters and the cultivation of the female mind: "Botany in an English dress" In : British Journal for Eighteenth-Century Studies. 28, 1, p. 1-18
- George, S. The cultivation of the female mind: enlightened growth, luxuriant decay and botanical analogy in eighteenth-century texts In : History of European Ideas. 31, 2, p. 209-223

== Bibliography ==
=== Academia ===
- "Dr Samantha George". Social Sciences, Arts & Humanities Research Institute. University of Hertfordshire. 2015.
- "Sam George". Academia.edu. 2015.
- "Open Graves, Open MInds: Vampires and the Undead in Modern Culture". University of Hertfordshire. 2015.
- George, Sam; Hughes, Bill (2012). "The Open Graves, Open Minds Project".
- "Dr Sam George". Battle of Ideas. Institute of Ideas. 2010.

=== Media ===
- Tobin, Lucy (6 April 2010). "University conference sinks its teeth into vampire fiction: A university lecturer hopes the undead can liven up English literature for the Twilight generation". The Guardian.
- Armistead, Claire (27 April 2012). "Guardian Books podcast: Dracula's literary legacy". Horror. Guardian.
- Espinoza, Javier (6 May 2010). "Have the Undead Become Americanized? Academics Lament How Vampires in Modern Culture Are 'Losing Their British Passports'; Decaffeinated Version of Dracula". Arts & Entertainment. Wall Street Journal.
- "Vampire conference at University of Hertfordshire". BBC News. 7 April 2010.
- Cawley, Laurence (25 November 2013). "Seven of the more unusual areas of university research: The 'coffin boffin': Dr Sam George, University of Hertfordshire". BBC News.
- "University to hold vampire conference". Education News. The Telegraph. 6 April 2010.

=== Reviews (Peer reviewed journals) ===
- Olszewski, Margaret (2007). "Samantha George, Botany, Sexuality and Women's Writing". The British Society for Literature and Science.
- Cook, E. H. (2 April 2009). "SAM GEORGE. Botany, Sexuality, and Women's Writing, 1760-1830: From Modest Shoot to Forward Plant". The Review of English Studies. 60 (245): 499–501. doi:10.1093/res/hgp012.
- Hay, Daisy (July 2009). "Sam George, Botany, Sexuality and Women's Writing 1760–1830: From Modest Shoot to Tender Plant (Manchester: Manchester University Press, 2007). 261 pp. £55.00 hardback. 9780719076978". Romanticism. 15 (2): 208–210. doi:10.3366/E1354991X09000695.
- Martin, Alison E (September 2010). "Botany, Sexuality and Women's Writing, 1760-1830. From Modest Shoot to Forward Plant – By Sam George". Journal for Eighteenth-Century Studies. 33 (3): 403–404. doi:10.1111/j.1754-0208.2009.00164.x.

=== Reviews (other) ===
- "Feminal Botanist or Botanical Feminist?". Transcontinental Garden Exchange. 19 September 2012.
- Harai, Cheryl (2015). "Botany, sexuality & women's writing 1760-1830 by Sam George- Essay".
- Marien, Tania (16 December 2011). "Botany Education in the 18th Century". ArtPlantae.

=== Related work ===
- Linné, Carl von (1785) [1774]. Systema vegetabilium (13th edition of Systema Naturae) [A System of Vegetables 2 vols. 1783–1785]. Lichfield: Lichfield Botanical Society.
- Shteir, Ann B. (1996). Cultivating women, cultivating science: Flora's daughters and botany in England, 1760-1860. Baltimore: Johns Hopkins University Press. ISBN 978-0-8018-6175-8.
- Fara, Patricia (2003). Sex, Botany and Empire: The Story of Carl Linnaeus and Joseph Banks. Cambridge: Icon Books. ISBN 9781840464443.
