= Patricia Fara =

British historian

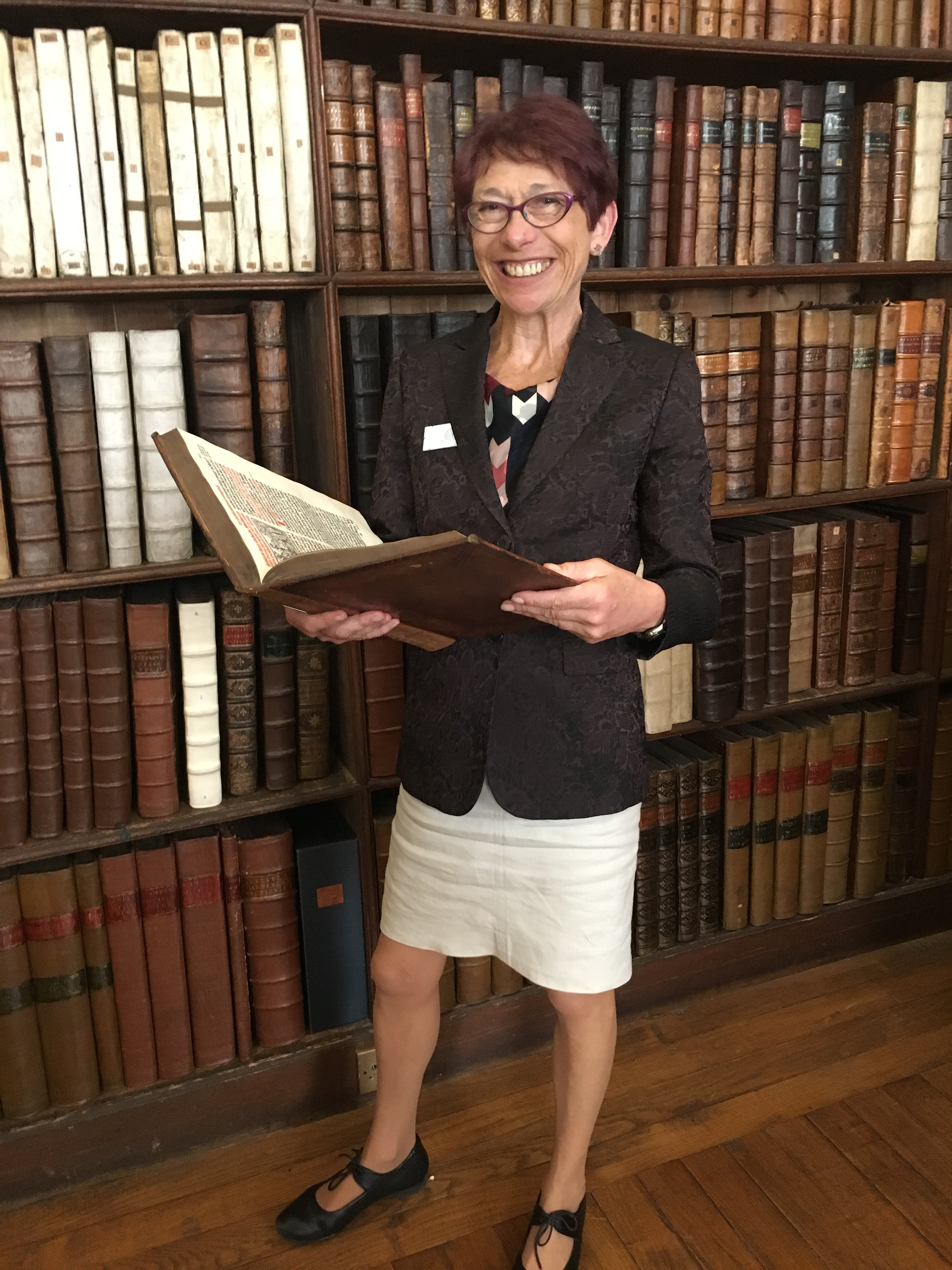
- Fara in 2018
- Known for: Women in science

Academic background
- Education: University of Oxford

Academic work
- Discipline: History of science
- Institutions: University of Cambridge

Patricia Fara is a college lecturer in the history of science at Clare College, Cambridge. She is a graduate of the University of Oxford and did her PhD at the University of London. She is a former Fellow of Darwin College and is an Emerita Fellow of Clare College, where she was previously Director of Studies in the History and Philosophy of Science. Fara was also a College Teaching Officer in the Department of History and Philosophy of Science. From 2016 to 2018, Fara was President of the British Society for the History of Science. In 2016, she became President of the Antiquarian Horological Society. Fara is author of numerous popular books on the history of science and has been a guest on BBC Radio 4's science and history discussion series In Our Time.

== Early life and education ==
Fara began her career as a physics teacher but returned to graduate studies as a mature student to specialise in History and Philosophy of Science, completing her PhD thesis at Imperial College, London, in 1993.

== Research and writing ==
Her areas of particular academic interest include the role of portraiture and art in the history of science, science in 18th-century England during the Enlightenment, and the role of women in science. She has written about numerous women in science, mathematics, engineering and medicine, including: Hertha Ayrton, Lady Helen Gleichen, Mona Chalmers Watson, Helen Gwynne-Vaughan, Isabel Emslie Hutton, Flora Murray, Ida Maclean, Marie Stopes, and Martha Annie Whiteley. Fara has argued for expanded access to childcare as a means of increasing the retention of women in science. She has written and co-authored a number of books for children on science. Fara is also a reviewer of books on history of science. She has written the award-winning Science: A Four Thousand Year History (2009) and Erasmus Darwin: Sex, Science, and Serendipity (2012). Her most recent book is A Lab of One's Own: Science and Suffrage in the First World War (2017). In 2013, Fara published an article in the journal Nature, stressing the fact that biographies of female scientists perpetuate stereotypes.

== Awards ==
- 2011: Dingle Prize, British Society for the History of Science for Science: A Four Thousand Year History (2009)
- 2022: Abraham Pais Prize for History of Physics

== Bibliography ==
- Fara, Patricia (1996). Sympathetic attractions : magnetic practices, beliefs, and symbolism in Eighteenth-Century England. Princeton University Press. ISBN 9781400864362.
- Fara, Patricia (December 1998). "Presidential portraits : Joseph Banks in the National Library". National Library of Australia News. IX (3): 7–10. Archived from the original on 19 January 2012.
- Fara, Patricia (2002) An Entertainment for Angels: Electricity in the Enlightenment Icon Books
- Fara, Patricia (2002) Newton: The Making of Genius Pan-MacMillan
- Fara, Patricia (2002) Scientists Anonymous: Great Stories of Women in Science. Totem Books.
- Fara, Patricia (2003). Sex, Botany and Empire: The Story of Carl Linnaeus and Joseph Banks. Cambridge: Icon Books. ISBN 9781840464443.
- Fara, Patricia (2004) Pandora's Breeches: Women, Science and Power in the Enlightenment Pimlico Books
- Fara, Patricia (2005) Fatal Attraction: Magnetic Mysteries of the Enlightenment Icon Books
- Fara, Patricia (2009) Science: A Four Thousand Year History Oxford University Press
- Fara, Patricia (2012). Erasmus Darwin : sex, science, and serendipity. Oxford: Oxford University Press. ISBN 9780199582662.
- Fara, Patricia (2017). A Lab of One's Own: Science and Suffrage in the First World War. Oxford: Oxford University Press. ISBN 978-0-19-879498-1.
- Fara, Patricia (2021) Life After Gravity: Isacc Newton's London Career Oxford University Press

== Broadcasts ==
- BBC Radio 4 In Our Time "Ada Lovelace", 6 March 2008
- BBC Radio 4 In Our Time "Vitalism", 28 October 2008.
- BBC Radio 4 In Our Time "Baconian Science", 2 April 2009.
- BBC Radio 4 In Our Time "Calculus", 24 September 2009
- BBC Radio 4 In Our Time "Women and Enlightenment Science", 4 November 2010.
- BBC Radio 4 In Our Time "Robert Hooke", 18 February 2016.
- BBC Radio 4 The Forum "Marie Curie - A Pioneering Life", 19 August 2017
- BBC Radio 4 In Our Time "Rosalind Franklin", 22 February 2018
- BBC Radio 4 Science Stories "Madame Lavoisier's Translation of Oxygen", 21 August 2019.
