= Patronage (novel) =

1814 novel by Maria Edgeworth

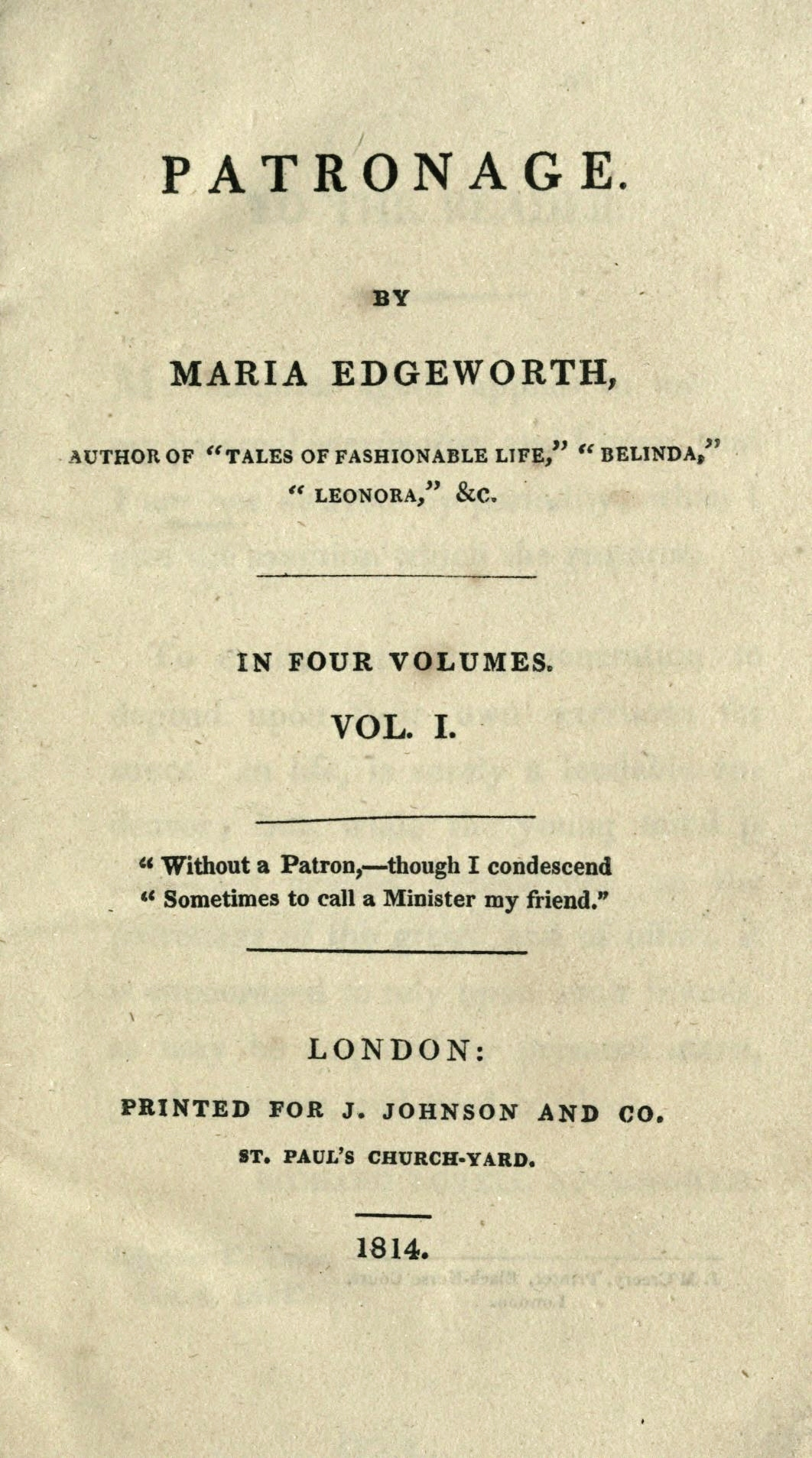
- First edition title page
- Author: Maria Edgeworth
- Language: English
- Publisher: J. Johnson
- Publication date: 1814
- Publication place: Ireland
- Media type: Print (hardback & paperback)

Patronage is a four volume fictional work by Anglo-Irish writer Maria Edgeworth and published in 1814. It is one of her later books, after such successes as Castle Rackrent (1800), Belinda (1801), Leonora (1806) and The Absentee in 1812. The novel is a long and ambitious one which she began writing in 1809. It is the longest of her novels.

Patronage as a book is path-making; it was among the first novels with a thesis and as such, it opened the way for Sir Walter Scott's historical novels. In the novel, Edgeworth focuses on and scrupulously explores the various types of patronage and the many forms it takes in all strata of English society. Despite the rigor of her analysis, Edgeworth obtains a sense of subtlety through her ingenious use of variations in characterizations and a well diversified plot. The plot is made up of many incidents, great and small, that take the reader through a wide range of situations. Much like her contemporary, Jane Austen, Edgeworth had a gift for conveying social conventions through brilliant dialogue and acute moral observations. However, unlike Austen, Edgeworth's writing diverges into essay and an overemphasis on ideas (of which she has a large number) and veers once or twice into the didactic.

The literary scholar Alastair Fowler notes her "flawless ear for speech" and ability to produce "brilliant dialogue", as well as the way her various subplots are linked by chains of causation that rest ultimately on a trivial plot element, much as Austen later was able to do so superbly.

Edgeworth was the eldest daughter of Richard Lovell Edgeworth, the Anglo-Irish politician, writer and inventor who had 21 other children with four wives. This book received the imprimatur of her famous father when published.
