= Harrington (novel) =

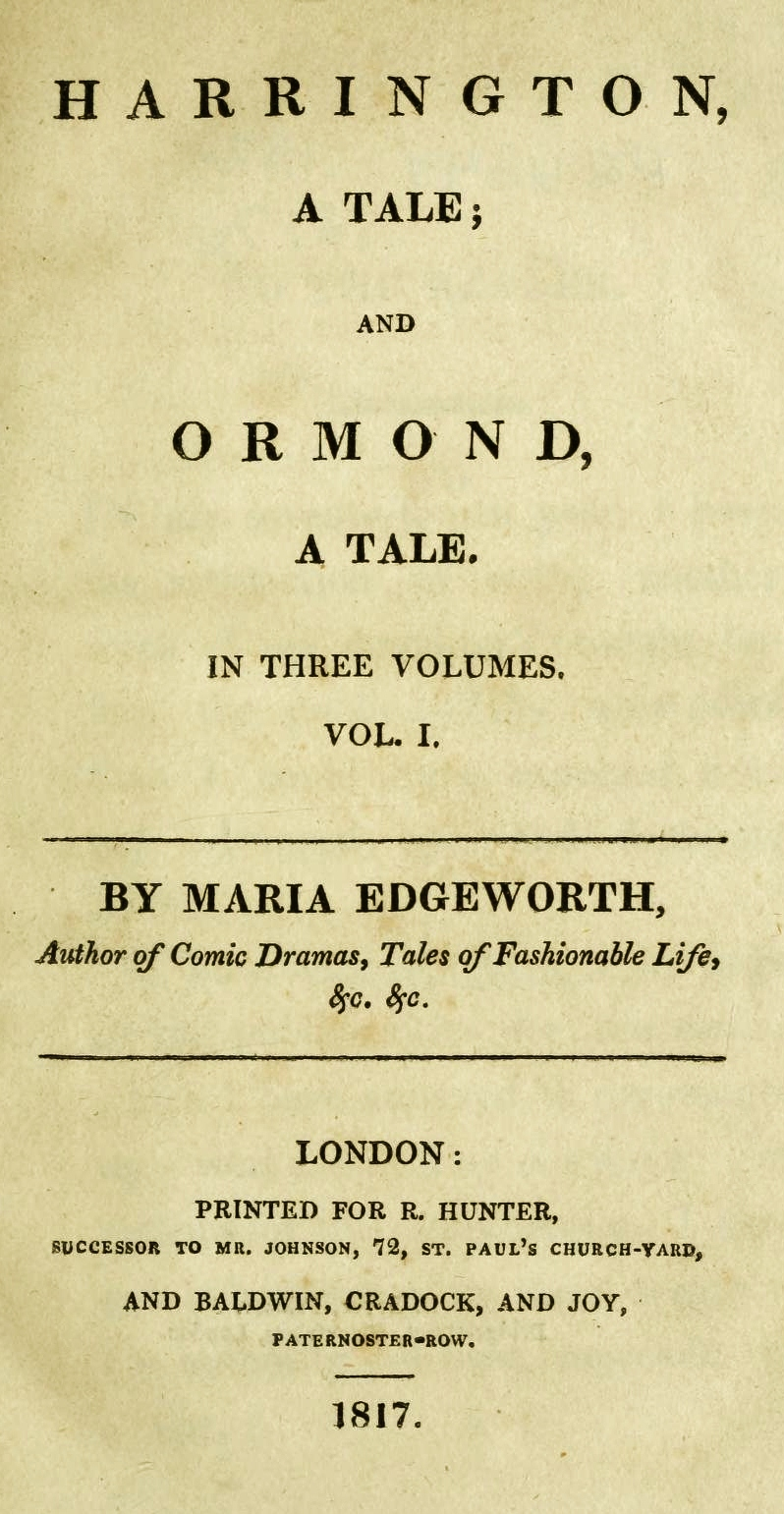
First edition title page

Harrington is an 1817 novel by Anglo-Irish novelist Maria Edgeworth. The novel was written in response to a letter from a Jewish-American reader who complained about Edgeworth's stereotypically antisemitic portrayals of Jews in Castle Rackrent (1800), Belinda (1801), The Absentee (1812), and her Moral Tales (1801) for children. The novel is an autobiography of a "recovering anti-Semite", whose youthful prejudices are undone by contact with various Jewish characters, particularly a young woman. It draws parallels between the religious discrimination of the Jews and the Catholics in Ireland. Set between the passing of the Jewish Naturalisation Act 1753 and the Gordon Riots of 1780, the timeframe highlights these connections.

== Synopsis ==
Harrington follows the protagonist of the same name who explores his memories to better understand his views on Jews. The novel begins with Harrington's early image of Jews, formed by stories told by his maid of "Simon the Jew". Harrington remarks that the stories were "used upon every occasion to reduce me to passive obedience." His parents further strengthen this image by rewarding Harrington's antisemitism. Only after attending public school and meeting the bully Mowbray are Harrington's views on Jews changed. Mowbray's tormenting of the Jewish peddler Jacob causes this sudden shift in thinking.

The story shifts to a romance novel with the introduction of Berenice Montenero, an American Jew who moved to England with her wealthy father. Harrington's family and friends are alarmed at his (Harrington's) choice of a Jewish woman, a relationship further impeded by the advances of Harrington's old rival Mowbray. Seeking marriage into a wealthy family, Mowbray's attempts to court Berenice are denied. As revenge, Mowbray brings charges of insanity against Harrington, a situation further compounded by his family threatening to disown him. To marry Berenice, Harrington must overcome these obstacles and prove himself to Mr. Montenero. He is thus tested "by experiences designed to arouse his enthusiasm and fear." Mowbray is exposed as the culprit behind Harrington's supposed insanity and Harrington is deemed worthy of marriage to Berenice. This strange courtship is concluded with the revelation by Mr. Montenero, "I have tried you to the utmost, and am satisfied both of the steadiness of your principles and of the strength of your attachment to my daughter-Berenice is not a Jewess."

== See also ==
- Daniel Deronda
