= Ennui (novel) =

1809 novel by Maria Edgeworth

Ennui is a novel by Maria Edgeworth published in 1809. It is a fictitious memoir of the Earl of Glenthorn, an English man who experiences excessive boredom (ennui) and attempts to find novelty and meaning in life. Edgeworth began writing the novel before 1805, and though she said she finished it that year, she likely continued revising it until around 1808.

== Background and textual history ==
Maria Edgeworth was an Irish writer who wrote about national identity, gender roles, and social issues. Her novels include Ennui, Castle Rackrent (1800), and The Absentee (1812).

The pre-publication history of the novel is unclear. While Edgeworth wrote in an 1805 letter that she was "finishing Ennui", her father later wrote that she substantially revised it after 1805, and she included scenes inspired from an 1806 event. She probably continued writing and revising the novel until a year or two before its 1809 publication. The novel was published shortly after the Irish Rebellion of 1798 and the official union between Ireland and Britain in 1800. It was inspired in part by Erasmus Darwin's Zoonomia; or, The Laws of Organic Life (1794), a medical tract discussing ennui by a family friend, and William Cullen's First Lines of the Practice of Physic (1777–1784). The novel was written during a time of great literary interest in ennui, including Thomas Skinner Surr's A Winter in London (1806) and several stories in Lady's Magazine.

Edgeworth published the novel alongside two others in her Tales of Fashionable Life, a collection of scandalous stories in the model of other commercially successful writing. By 1813, Edgeworth published three further editions of the text, and her Tales were successful.

== Synopsis ==
The Earl of Glenthorn is a rich Englishman with excessive boredom – ennui, a male condition corresponding to hysteria. His marriage is unhappy and culminates in divorce. He attempts to find novelty in life by gambling, eating food, and traveling; gambling is the only activity which brings him any excitement. He tries to kill himself but fails. He visits Ireland to find meaning in life and engages in democratic projects, yet he remains bored. His parentage is revealed: He was switched at birth and he is not the true Earl of Glenthorn but the son of an Irish mother. Following this reveal, he has a more fulfilling and appreciative life, which includes being remarried and taking on a new name.

== Reception and legacy ==
According to Esther Wohlgemut, in Edgeworth's novel, "foreignness is not so much a political classification as a psychological relationship" that can lead to emotional excesses like ennui. She argues that while Glenthorn ultimately visits Ireland, he remains foreign to that place; even though his parents are Irish, he has an essentially English identity prior to the reveal. Critics generally understand the novel as a commentary on the formation of the British–Irish union, a union which Edgeworth had conflicting opinions on. The novel is understood by critic Deborah Weiss as a commentary on class, though she understands Edgeworth's writing as not anti-aristocratic; for Weiss, Edgeworth's essential point is that all social classes can improve.
