= Leonora (novel) =

1806 novel by Maria Edgeworth

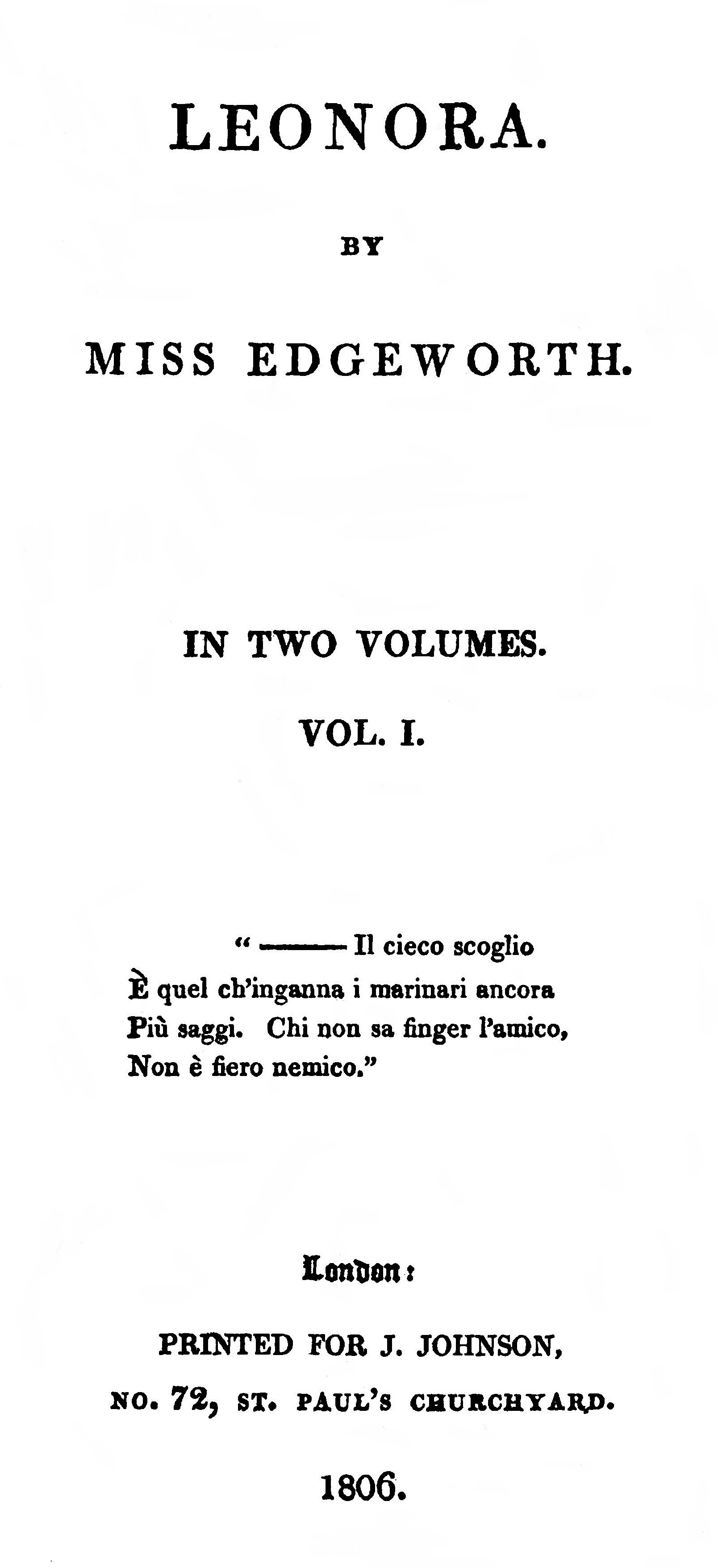
- Title page of the first edition
- Author: Maria Edgeworth
- Language: English
- Genre: Epistolary novel
- Publisher: Printed [by Joyce Gold] for J[oseph] Johnson
- Publication date: 1806
- Publication place: London, England, United Kingdom
- Media type: Print (hardcover)
- Pages: 291 (volume I), 291 (volume II)
- OCLC: 656563759

Leonora is a novel written by Maria Edgeworth and published in 1806.

Although Edgeworth is known for having her novels (Castle Rackrent, The Absentee) address issues of nationalism in an Anglo-Irish context, Leonora instead privileges English manners over French ones. The plot of the novel centres on the newly married Leonora and her decision to bring back to England a woman who had been exiled to France. The woman, Olivia, is known as a "coquette," and her controversial behaviour with regard to her marriage had driven her to France, where she cultivated an aristocratic, "French" sensibility that exists apart from conventional morality.

The novel is written in an epistolary style, which means all of the action is mediated through personal letters and the letter-writers' points-of-view. By having the main characters tell the story through their own perspectives, the reader gets to read full articulations of competing sensibilities and philosophies, although the narrative clearly prefers Leonora's prudent reserve over Olivia's extravagant emotional displays.

Indeed, this novel can be read as a critique of sensibility, a behavioural phenomenon that tries to correlate a person's emotional sensitivity with her elevated moral sentiments. Olivia, a self-professed woman of sensibility, often makes dramatic displays of feeling that are described by others as "theatrical," or contrived, and in her personal correspondence with her French friend, Gabrielle, Olivia makes grand claims about sentiment and love that, conveniently, justify her insatiable need for attention, particularly male attention. While a conventional reading of Jane Austen's Sense and Sensibility dismisses the heroine Marianne's sensibility as romantic teenage folly, Edgeworth's novel Leonora emphasises Olivia's behaviour as hypocritical narcissism.

Maria Edgeworth's letter to Mrs. Pruxton at Black Castle, Navan, dated 8 June 1806, reads:

"------ Lady Olivia in 'Leonora' is now supposed by all Dublin to be a portrait of Lady Asgill [wife of Sir Charles Asgill, 2nd Baronet] and that wherever they go they have to defend me by asserting that I'm not acquainted with the said Lady Asgill. Very luckily I never did meet her at Lady Holt's where she was intimate. She was educated by Mademoiselle Le Noir who was Miss Bracebridge's governess and who was more like Mademoiselle Panache than Lady Asgill is - to Olivia - at all events this fancy of the Dublin fine world promotes the sale of the book and I am content. -------."

Lady Bessborough, writing to Granville Leveson-Gower from Paris on Thursday, 23 December 1802, had this to say about Maria Edgeworth:

"…..I was introduc'd by him [François de la Harpe] to the famous Miss Edgeworth and her Brother. By the by, I am sure she wrote it all herself, for the brother seems a fool and a coxcomb; she very ugly, but delightful."
