= Clarendon Park =

Clarendon Park may refer to:

== England ==
- Clarendon Park, Epsom, Surrey, England; see Residents Associations of Epsom and Ewell
- Clarendon Park, Leicester, Leicestershire, England
- Clarendon Park, Oxshott, Surrey, England; see Long Grove Hospital
- Clarendon Park, Wiltshire, England
- A park in Pendleton, Greater Manchester

== Other places ==
- Clarendon Park, Jamaica
- A neighborhood in Uptown, Chicago, Illinois, United States

== Fictional places ==
- A fictional estate in the 1834 Maria Edgeworth novel Helen
