= André (play) =

Play written by William Dunlap

- Written by: William Dunlap

Premiere
- Date premiered: March 30, 1798
- Place premiered: Park Theatre, New York City

André; a Tragedy in Five Acts is a play by William Dunlap, first produced at the Park Theatre in New York City on March 30, 1798, by the Old American Company, published in that same year together with a collection of historic documents relating to the case of the title character, Major John André, the British officer who was hanged as a spy on October 2, 1780, for his role in the treason of Benedict Arnold. The play does not go into the historic details, but rather presents a fictionalized account of the American debate over whether to spare or hang him. Only three characters in the play are historic: André himself, George Washington (referred to throughout the text, except once in a passage inserted between the first two performances, simply as "The General"), and Honora Sneyd, who had been briefly engaged to André ten years earlier under the auspices of Anna Seward, who had done much to romanticize the affair in her Monody on Major André of 1781. (Actually, Honora Sneyd had died of consumption some months before André's death, and never went to America.)

Despite the fictionalization, the play genuinely shows the anguish felt by many on the American side over the decision to hang the brilliant and charming young officer, and it is written in unusually supple verse for the 18th century.

Apart from its intrinsic merits, the play is noteworthy as the first American tragedy written on an American subject. However, despite being nowadays acknowledged as Dunlap's best piece of work, it was not a great success at the time. Its lack of popularity stemmed from the controversial lionization of André. Moreover, at opening night, the crowd rose to its feet in anger and indignation when Bland, a soldier in the play, hurled his cockade to the ground at the prospect of André being sentenced to death. The controversy was twofold— not only was Bland losing composure over the fate of a British spy but the cockade (worn by Patriots and then later by the revolutionaries during the French Revolution to emulate their spirit) being tossed to the floor was interpreted by many as Dunlap attacking the American Revolution itself.

Dunlap later recycled much of André into his pageant-play The Glory of Columbia, Her Yeomanry, a piece resonating with the Populist tone in theatre at the time, and which continued to be regularly produced for fifty years.

== Characters ==
André – American soldier accused of being a British spy.

Bland – a soldier whom André saved, son of Mrs. Bland. He tries and fails to persuade the General to free André.

General – highest ranking soldier, he orders André to be hanged.

Honora – André's wife, who begs the General to free André in vain.

Melville – an American captain. He does not approve of the hanging and supports Honora.

Seward – an American soldier.

Mrs. Bland – Bland's mother.

Other minor characters including Children, American Officer, British Officer, American Sargeant etc.
