= The Glory of Columbia, Her Yeomanry =

1803 play by William Dunlap

The Glory of Columbia, Her Yeomanry is an 1803 play by the American playwright William Dunlap. It was first performed at the Park Theatre, New York, on 4 July 1803.

The Glory of Columbia is a piece resonating with the populist tone in theatre at the time. Much of it is adapted from Dunlap's earlier unsuccessful play André; a Tragedy in Five Acts. Unlike André, The Glory of Columbia was an instant success, and continued to be regularly produced for fifty years.
