= Ormond (novel) =

Novel by Maria Edgeworth

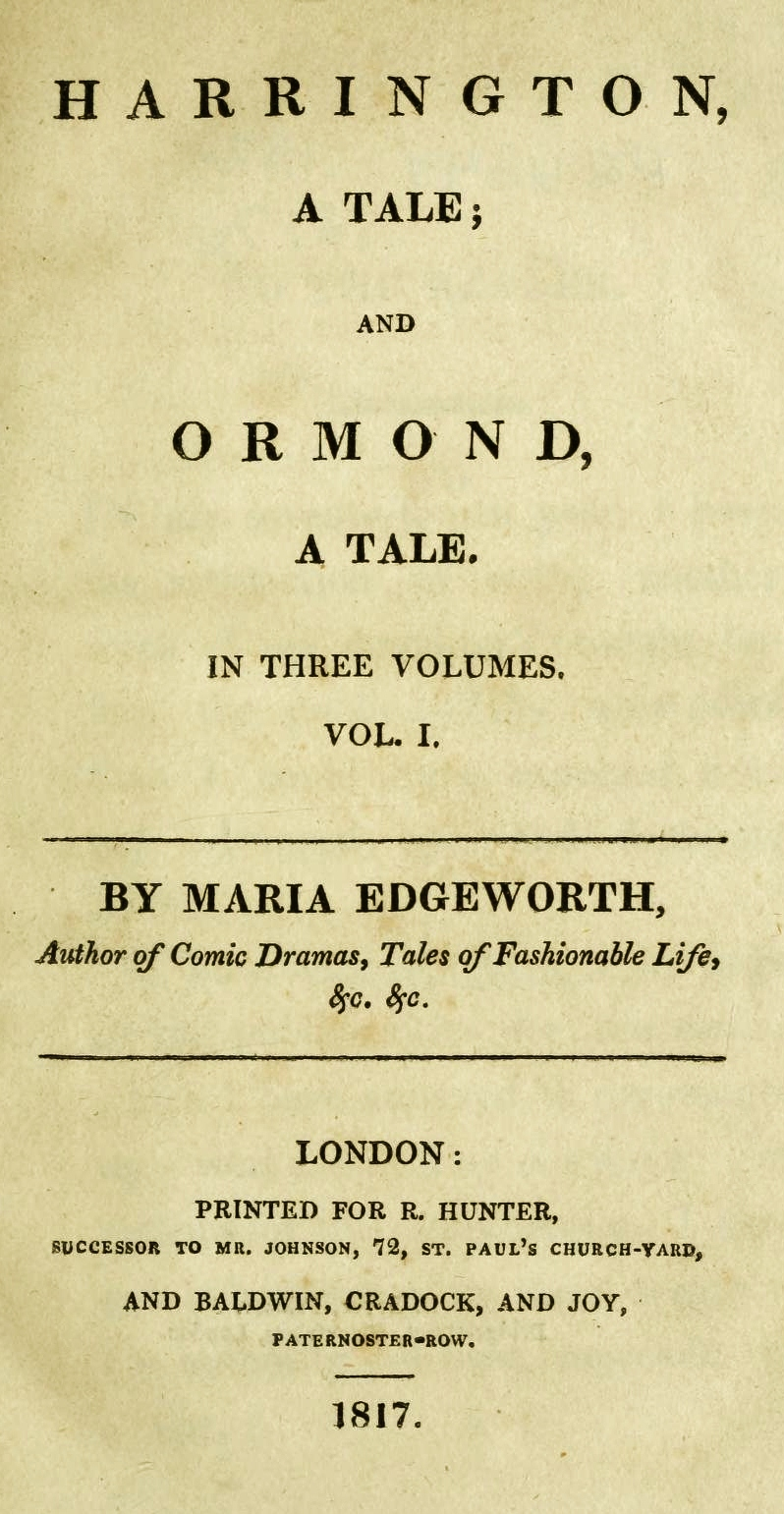
- First edition title page
- Author: Maria Edgeworth
- Language: English
- Genre: Novel
- Publication date: June 1817
- Publication place: United Kingdom
- Media type: Print (Hardcover)

Ormond is a novel by Maria Edgeworth published in June 1817. It tells the story of Harry Ormond, a hero who rises from poverty to wealth. Set both in Ireland and France, the novel uses different places to represent different paths that Ormond might take and different political ideologies. Ireland and France are shown as linked through their revolutionary fervour. In 1798, France had sent aid to the United Irishmen and this tie is hinted at through Ormond's travels. However, in the end Ormond chooses to serve in Britain's military, thus signalling Ireland's ties with England rather than its independence or its ties to France. The novel thematizes "obedience to tradition and culture", signifying these by allusions to Edmund Burke's Reflections on the Revolution in France (1790).
