= Practical Education =

Educational treatise by Maria and Richard Lovell Edgeworth

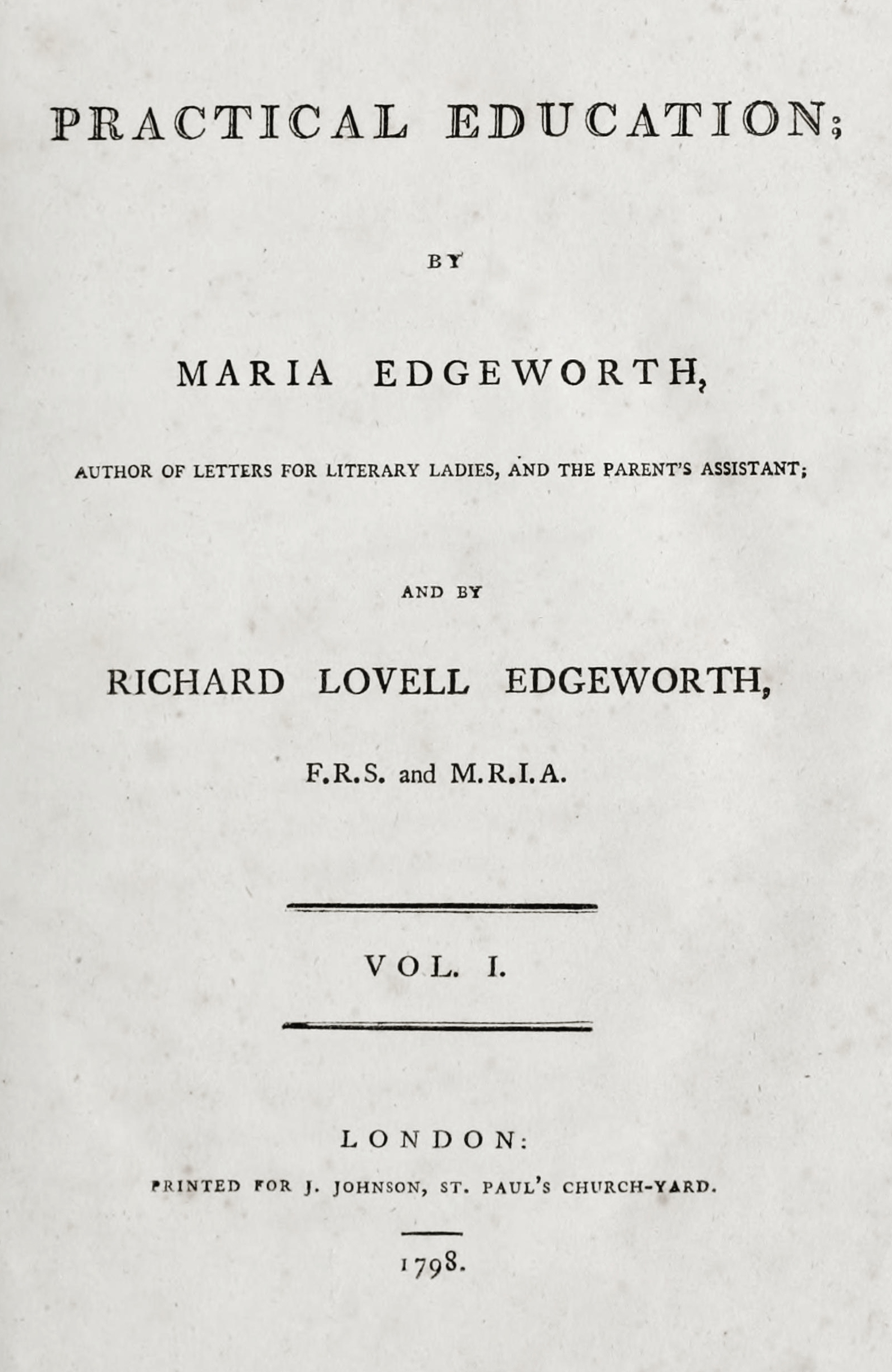
Title page from the first edition

Practical Education is an educational treatise written by Maria Edgeworth and her father Richard Lovell Edgeworth. Published in 1798, it is a comprehensive theory of education that combines the ideas of philosophers John Locke and Jean-Jacques Rousseau as well as of educational writers such as Thomas Day, William Godwin, Joseph Priestley, and Catharine Macaulay. The Edgeworths' theory of education was based on the premise that a child's early experiences are formative and that the associations they form early in life are long-lasting. They also encourage hands-on learning and include suggestions of "experiments" that children can perform and learn fun. Following Locke's emphasis on the importance of concrete language over abstract, the Edgeworth's argued that words should clearly indicate "distinct ideas". This contributed to what Romanticist Alan Richardson calls "their controversial positions", including their resistance to reading fairy tales to children or discussing religion with them.

The critic Nancy Armstrong has described Practical Education and Erasmus Darwin's A Plan for the Conduct of Female Education in Boarding Schools (1798) as "efforts at institutionalizing the curriculum proposed by" conduct books.

== In popular culture ==
Namechecked in "An Offer from a Gentleman", a 2026 episode of the regency romance series Bridgerton.
