= Helen (novel) =

Novel by Maria Edgeworth

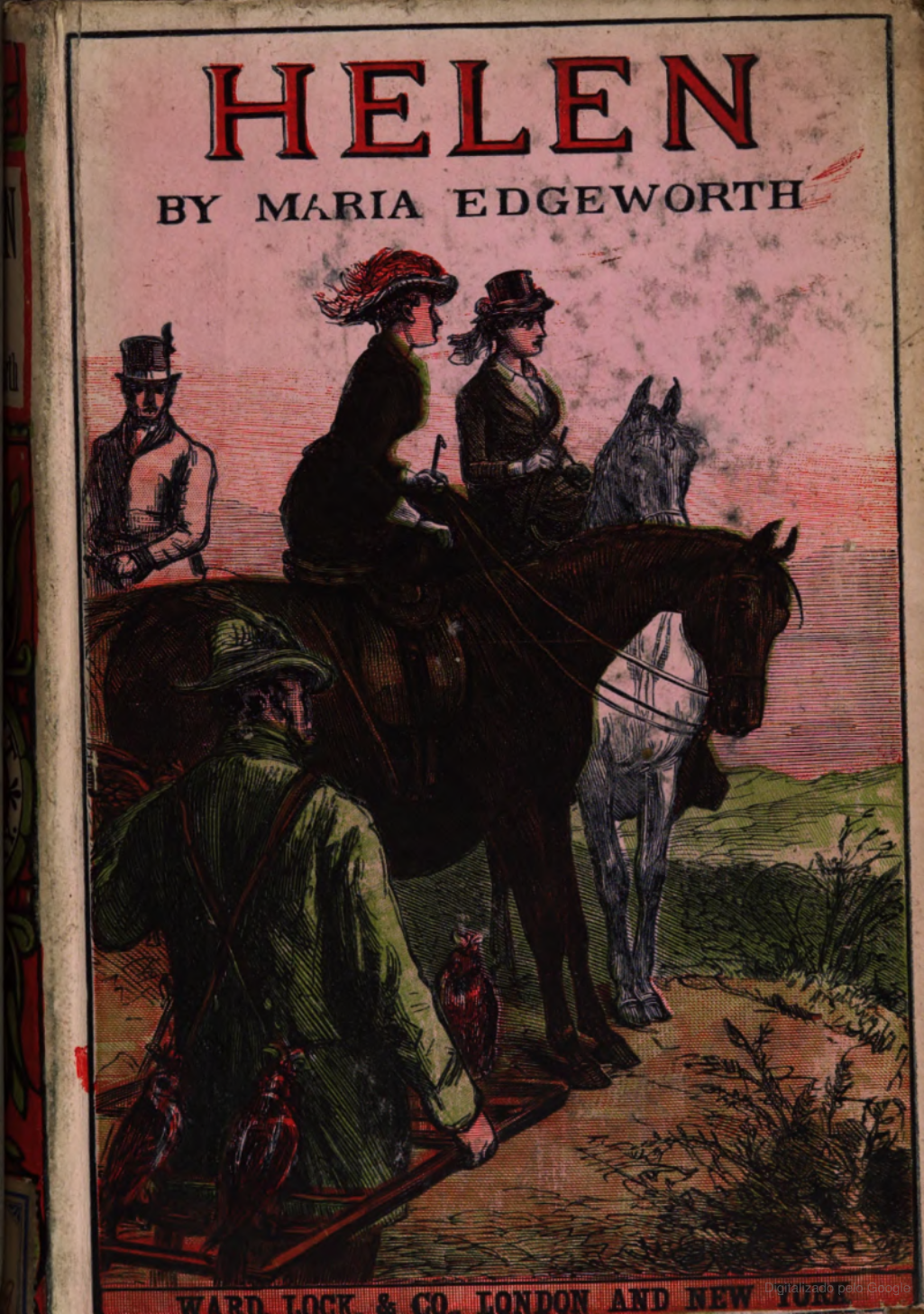
- Cover of a 1883 reprint by Ward, Lock & Co.
- Author: Maria Edgeworth
- Publication date: 1834

Helen is a novel by Maria Edgeworth (1767–1849). It was written in 1834, late in the writer's life.

== Synopsis ==
Helen tells the story of a young orphan, Helen Stanley, with the first half occurring near the country house of Lord and Lady Davenant, and the second—arguably more dramatic—half starting when Helen moves to London.

== Criticism ==
The novel's heavy use of allusion has been said to make it read more as a reflection on Edgeworth's personal career than as an outdated text.

Here is what one biographer of Maria Edgeworth has to say about Helen:

"It was in 1830–when already past sixty years of age–that Miss Edgeworth set to work upon the last, and what, at the time it was written, was possibly the most successful of all her novels–namely, Helen. Any reader who will take it down from its shelf, and glance over it, will quickly perceive that it is a novel of a very much more modern type than any other by the same hand. In reading it we are aware that the eighteenth century has at last dropped out of sight, and that we are well out upon the nineteenth, not indeed as yet 'Victorian', but in a sort of midway region, on the road to that superior epoch."
