= Maria Edgeworth =

Anglo-Irish novelist (1768–1849)

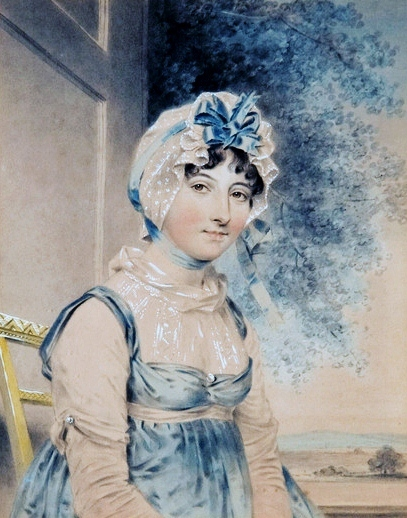
- Portrait by John Downman, 1807
- Born: 1 January 1768; Black Bourton, Oxfordshire, England
- Died: 22 May 1849 (aged 81); Edgeworthstown, County Longford, Ireland
- Resting place: St. John's Churchyard, Edgeworthstown
- Occupation: Novelist
- Parents: Richard Lovell Edgeworth (father); Honora Edgeworth (stepmother)
- Writing career
- Period: 18th century
- Genres: Regionalism, romance, children's literature

Signature
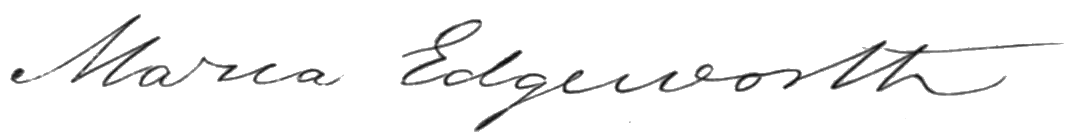

Maria Edgeworth (1 January 1768 – 22 May 1849) was an Anglo-Irish novelist of adult and children's literature. She was one of the first realist writers in children's literature and a significant figure in the evolution of the novel in Europe. She held critical views on estate management, politics, and education, and corresponded with some of the leading literary and economic writers, including Sir Walter Scott and David Ricardo. During the first decade of the 19th century she was one of the most widely read novelists in Britain and Ireland. Her name today is most commonly associated with Castle Rackrent, her first novel, in which she, while Anglican herself, used the voice of an Irish Catholic character to narrate the dissipation and decline of a family from her own landed Anglo-Irish class.

== Life ==
=== Early life ===
Maria Edgeworth was born in Black Bourton, Oxfordshire. She was the second child of Richard Lovell Edgeworth (who eventually fathered twenty-two surviving children by four wives) and Anna Maria Edgeworth (née Elers); Maria was thus an aunt of Francis Ysidro Edgeworth. She spent her early years with her mother's family in England, living at The Limes (now known as Edgeworth House) in Northchurch, by Berkhamsted in Hertfordshire. Her mother died when Maria was five, and when her father married his second wife Honora Sneyd in 1773, she went with him to his estate, Edgeworthstown, in County Longford, Ireland.

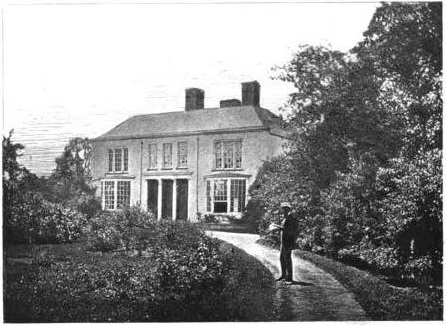
Edgeworthstown House, Ireland

Maria was sent to Mrs. Lattafière's school in Derby after Honora fell ill in 1775. After Honora died in 1780 Maria's father married Honora's sister Elizabeth (then socially disapproved and legally forbidden from 1833 until the Deceased Wife's Sister's Marriage Act 1907). Maria transferred to Mrs. Devis's school in London. Her father's attention became fully focused on her in 1781 when she nearly lost her sight to an eye infection. Returning home at the age of 14, she took charge of her many younger siblings and was home-tutored in law, Irish economics and politics, science, and literature by her father. She also started her lifelong correspondences with learned men, mainly members of the Lunar Society.

She became her father's assistant in managing the Edgeworthstown estate, which had become run-down during the family's 1777–1782 absence; she would live and write there for the rest of her life. With their bond strengthened, Maria and her father began a lifelong academic collaboration "of which she was the more able and nimble mind". Present at Edgeworthstown was an extended family, servants and tenants. She observed and recorded the details of daily Irish life, later drawing on this experience for her novels about the Irish. She also mixed with the Anglo-Irish gentry, particularly Kitty Pakenham (later the wife of Arthur Wellesley, 1st Duke of Wellington), Lady Moira, and her aunt Margaret Ruxton of Blackcastle. Margaret supplied her with the novels of Ann Radcliffe and William Godwin and encouraged her in her writing.

=== Travels ===
In 1798 Richard married Frances Beaufort, daughter of Daniel Augustus Beaufort, who instigated the idea of travelling to England and the European continent. Frances, a year younger than Maria, became her lifelong confidante. The family travelled first to London in 1799.

In 1802 the Edgeworths toured The Midlands. They then travelled to Continental France, first to Brussels and then to France (during the Peace of Amiens, a brief lull in the French Revolutionary and Napoleonic Wars). They met all the notables, and Maria received a marriage proposal from a Swedish courtier, Abraham Niclas Edelcrantz. Her letter on the subject seems very cool, but her stepmother assures us in the Augustus Hare Life and Letters that Maria loved him very much and did not get over the affair quickly. They came home to Ireland in 1803 on the eve of the resumption of the wars and Maria returned to writing. Tales of Fashionable Life, The Absentee and Ormond are novels of Irish life. Edgeworth was an extremely popular author who was compared with her contemporary writers Jane Austen and Sir Walter Scott. She initially earned more than them, and used her income to help her siblings.

On a visit to London in 1813, where she was received as a literary lion, Maria met Lord Byron (whom she disliked) and Humphry Davy. She entered into a long correspondence with the ultra-Tory Sir Walter Scott after the publication of Waverley in 1814, in which he gratefully acknowledged her influence, and they formed a lasting friendship. She visited him in Scotland at Abbotsford House in 1823, where he took her on a tour of the area. The next year, Sir Walter visited Edgeworthstown. When passing through the village, one of the party wrote, "We found neither mud hovels nor naked peasantry, but snug cottages and smiles all about". A counter view was provided by another visitor who stated that the residents of Edgeworthstown treated Edgeworth with contempt, refusing even to feign politeness.

=== Later life ===
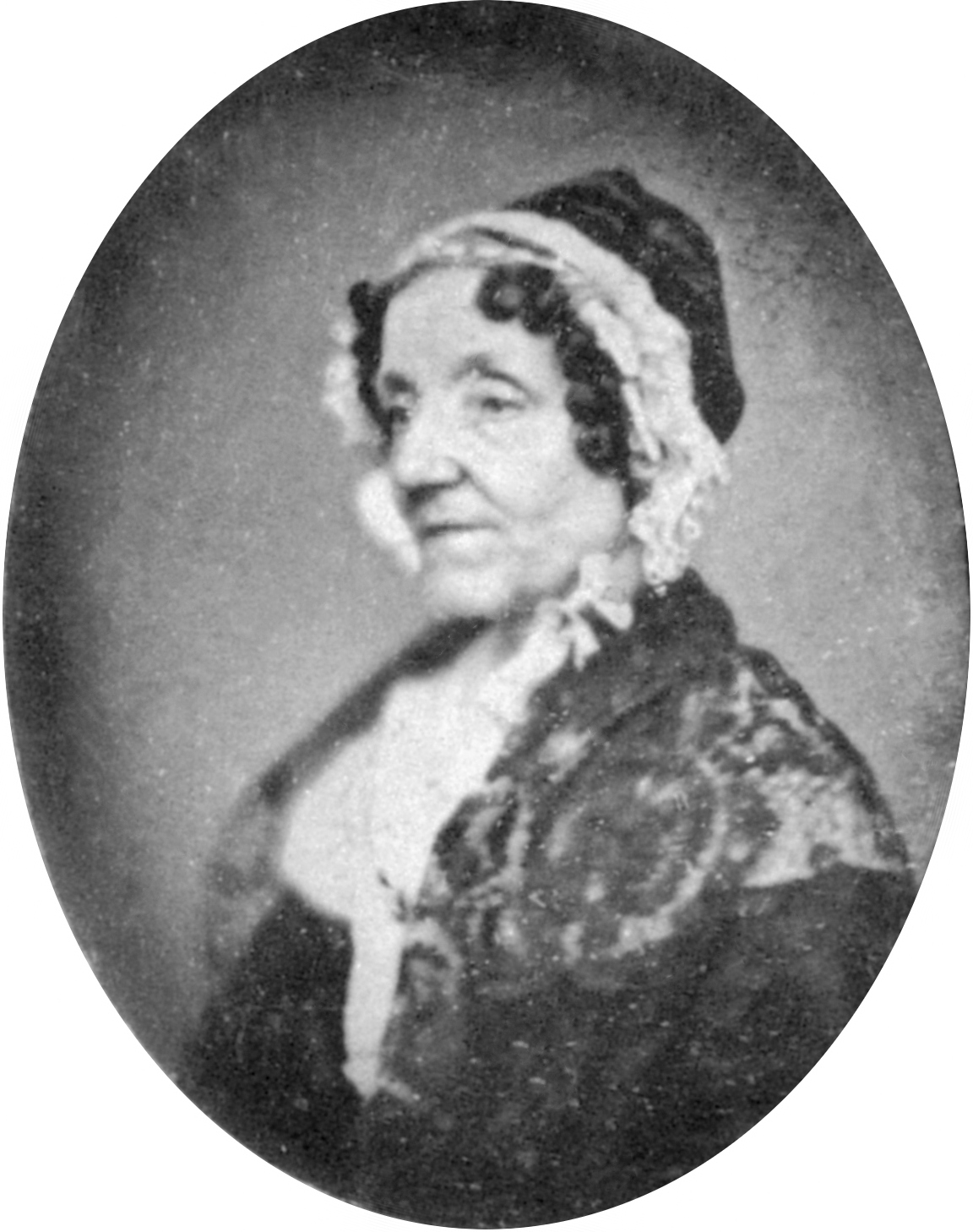
Maria Edgeworth, c. 1841

Richard Edgeworth was comparatively fair and forgiving in his dealings with his tenants and was actively involved in the estate's management. After debating the issue with the economist David Ricardo, Maria came to believe that better management and the further application of science to agriculture would raise food production and lower prices. Both Richard and Maria were also in favour of Catholic Emancipation, enfranchisement for Catholics without property restrictions (although he believed it was against his own interest), agricultural reform and increased educational opportunities for women. She particularly worked hard to improve the living standards of the poor in Edgeworthstown. In trying to improve conditions in the village she provided schools for the local children of all denominations.

After her father's death in 1817 she edited his memoirs, and extended them with her biographical comments. She was an active writer to the last, with her final work, the novella Orlandino, being written and published in 1848.

She worked for the relief of the famine-stricken Irish peasants during the Great Famine. She wrote Orlandino for the benefit of the Relieve Fund. Her letters to the Quaker Relief Committee provide a vivid account of the desperate plight facing the tenants in Edgeworthstown, the extreme conditions under which they lived, and the struggle to obtain whatever aid and assistance she could to alleviate their plight. Through her efforts she received gifts for the poor from America.

During the Irish Famine Edgeworth insisted that only those of her tenants who had paid their rent in full would receive relief. Edgeworth also punished those of her tenants who voted against her Tory preferences.

With the election of William Rowan Hamilton to president of the Royal Irish Academy, Maria became a dominant source of advice for Hamilton, particularly on the issue of literature in Ireland. She suggested that women should be allowed to participate in events held by the academy. For her guidance and help, Hamilton made Edgeworth an honorary member of the Royal Irish Academy in 1837, following in the footsteps of Louisa Beaufort, a former member of the academy and a relative of hers.

After a visit to see her relations in Trim, Maria, now in her eighties, began to feel heart pains and died suddenly of a heart attack in Edgeworthstown on 22 May 1849.

== Views ==
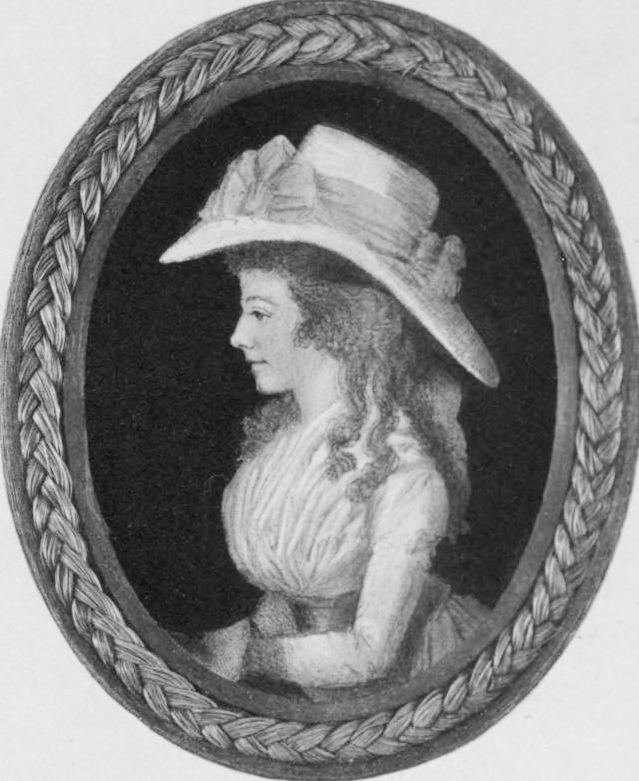
Miniature of Edgeworth by Adam Buck, c. 1790

Though Maria Edgeworth spent most of her childhood in England, her life in Ireland had a profound impact on both her thinking and views on Irish culture. Fauske and Kaufman conclude, "[She] used her fiction to address the inherent problems of acts delineated by religious, national, racial, class based, sexual, and gendered identities". Edgeworth used works such Castle Rackrent and Harrington to express her feelings on controversial issues.

=== Ireland ===
In her works, Edgeworth created a nostalgic and imagined Irish past in an attempt to celebrate the culture of Ireland. Academic Suvendrini Perera argued Edgeworth's novels traced "the gradual anglicanization of feudal Irish society". Edgeworth's goal in her works was to show the Irish as equal to the British, and therefore warranting an equal, though not separate, status. Essay on Irish Bulls rejects the Irish bulls stereotype and portrays the people of Ireland accurately in realistic, everyday settings. This is a common theme in her works on Ireland, combating stereotypes of Irish people with accurate representations. In her works, Edgeworth also placed a special focus on the linguistic differences between Irish and British culture, attempting to showcase the dynamism and intricacies of Irish society. Irish novelist Seamus Deane connected Edgeworth's depiction of Ireland and its relationship to Britain as being in line with wider Enlightenment ideals, noting that Edgeworth "was not the first novelist to have chosen Ireland as her ‘scene’; but she was the first to realize that there was, within it, a missionary opportunity to convert it to Enlightenment faith and rescue it from its ‘romantic’ conditions".

Edgeworth's writing on Ireland, especially her early Irish stories, offer an important rearticulation of Burkean local attachment and philosophical cosmopolitanism to produce an understanding of the nation as neither tightly bordered (like nations based on historical premises such as blood or inheritance) or not borderless (like those based on rational notions of universal inclusion). Edgeworth used her writing to reconsider the meaning of the denomination "Anglo-Irish", and through her interrogation she reinterpreted both cosmopolitan and national definitions of belonging so as to reconstitute "Anglo-Irish" less as a category than as an ongoing mediation between borders. In Edgeworth's Irish novels, education is the key to both individual and national improvement, according to Edgeworth, "it is the foundation of the well-governed estate and the foundation of the well-governed nation". More specifically, a slow process of education instils transnational understanding in the Irish people while retaining the bonds of local attachment by which the nation is secured. The centrality of education not only suggests Edgeworth's wish for a rooted yet cosmopolitan or transnational judgment, but also distinguishes her writing from constructions of national identity as national character, linking her through to earlier cosmopolitan constructions of universal human subjects. By claiming national difference as anchored in education, culture rather than nature, Edgeworth gives to national identity a sociocultural foundation, and thereby opens a space in which change can happen.

=== Social ===
Maria agreed with the Acts of Union 1800, but thought that it should not be passed against the wishes of the Irish people. Concerning education, she thought boys and girls should be educated equally and together, drawing upon Rousseau's ideas. She believed a woman should only marry someone who suits her in "character, temper, and understanding". Becoming an old maid was preferable to an incompatible union. Tales of Fashionable Life and Patronage attacked the Whigs' governance of Ireland as corrupt and unrepresentative. Edgeworth strove for the self-realization of women and stressed the importance of the individual. She also wanted greater participation in politics by middle-class women. Her work Helen clearly demonstrates this point in the passage: "Women are now so highly cultivated, and political subjects are at present of so much importance, of such high interest, to all human creatures who live together in society, you can hardly expect, Helen, that you, as a rational being, can go through the world as it now is, without forming any opinion on points of public importance. You cannot, I conceive, satisfy yourself with the common namby-pamby little missy phrase, 'ladies have nothing to do with politics'." She sympathised with Catholics and supported gradual, though not immediate, Catholic Emancipation.

=== Education ===
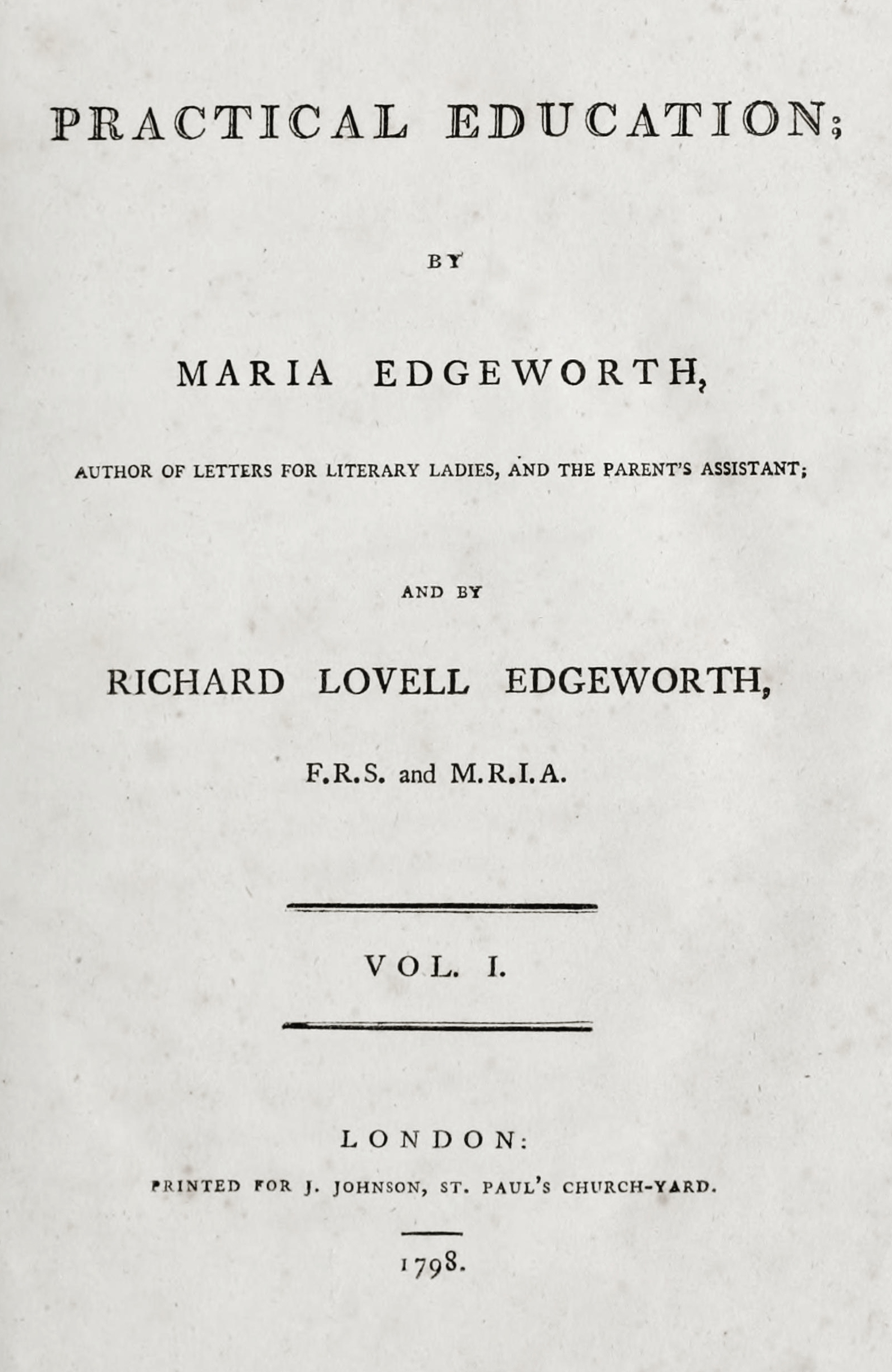
First edition title page to Practical Education, 1798

In her 1798 book Practical Education, she advanced a scientific approach to education, acknowledging the difficulty of doing such research which was "patiently reduced to an experimental science". She claimed no adherence to a school of thought, no new theory and purposefully avoided religion and politics. In the book's 25 chapters, she presages modern improvements to age-related educational materials, for example: in geography, maps bordered with suitable illustrated biographies; in chronology, something "besides merely committing names and dates to memory"; in chemistry, safe chemical experiments that children might undertake. She maintained that unnecessarily causing fatigue should be a great concern of educators. To help illustrate the care that must be taken in teaching children and to emphasise the necessity of properly directing and managing their attentiveness, Maria Edgeworth drew several comparisons with non-European peoples. In making the point that any mode of instruction that tired the attention was hurtful to children, her reasoning was that people can pay attention only to one thing at a time, and because children can appear resistant to repetition, teachers naturally should vary things. However, educators should always be mindful of the fact that, "while variety relieves the mind, the objects which are varied must not all be entirely new, for novelty and variety when joined, fatigue the mind" as Edgeworth states. The teaching of children needed to follow carefully considered methods, needed to evidence concern for appropriateness and proper sequencing, and needed to be guided by consideration from forms of teaching that would be empowering and enabling, not fatiguing or disabling. In Edgeworth's work, the attention of the child appears as a key site for pedagogical work and interventions.

== Work ==
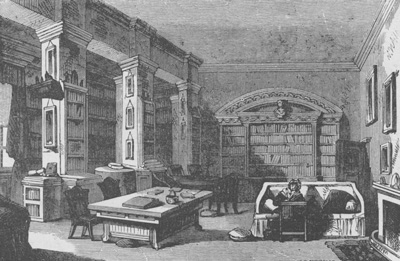
Library at Edgeworthstown House 1888

Edgeworth's early literary efforts have often been considered melodramatic rather than realistic. Recent scholarship, however, has uncovered the importance of Edgeworth's previously unpublished juvenilia manuscript, The Double Disguise (1786). In particular, The Double Disguise signals Edgeworth's turn toward realism and is now considered a seminal regional narrative predating Castle Rackrent (1800). In addition, Edgeworth wrote many children's novels that conveyed moral lessons to their audience (often in partnership with her friend Louise Swanton Belloc, a French writer, translator, and advocate for the education of women and children, whose many translations of Edgeworth's works were largely responsible for her popularity in France). One of her schoolgirl novels features a villain who wore a mask made from the skin of a dead man's face. Edgeworth's first published work was Letters for Literary Ladies in 1795. This work was a response to Thomas Day's, a member of the Lunar Society, belief that women should not be authors or taught to think. Her work, "An Essay on the Noble Science of Self-Justification" (1795) is written for a female audience in which she convinces women that the fair sex is endowed with an art of self-justification and women should use their gifts to continually challenge the force and power of men, especially their husbands, with wit and intelligence. It humorously and satirically explores the feminine argumentative method. This was followed in 1796 by her first children's book, The Parent's Assistant, which included Edgeworth's celebrated short story "The Purple Jar". The Parent's Assistant was influenced by her father's work and perspectives on children's education.

Mr. Edgeworth, a well-known author and inventor, encouraged his daughter's career. At the height of her creative endeavours, Maria wrote, "Seriously it was to please my Father I first exerted myself to write, to please him I continued". Though the impetus for Maria's works, Mr. Edgeworth has been criticised for his insistence on approving and editing her work. The tales in The Parent's Assistant were approved by her father before he would allow them to be read to her younger siblings. It is speculated that her stepmother and siblings also helped in the editing process of Edgeworth's work.

Practical Education (1798) (Note: Ostensibly a collaborative project between father and daughter, but in reality a family project (Nash 2006, p. 59).) is a progressive work on education that combines the ideas of Locke and Rousseau with scientific inquiry. Edgeworth asserts that "learning should be a positive experience and that the discipline of education is more important during the formative years than the acquisition of knowledge". The system attempted to "adapt both the curriculum and methods of teaching to the needs of the child; the endeavour to explain moral habits and the learning process through associationism; and most important, the effort to entrust the child with the responsibility for his own mental culture". The ultimate goal of Edgeworth's system was to create an independent thinker who understands the consequences of his or her actions.

Her first novel, Castle Rackrent (1800) was written and submitted for anonymous publication in 1800 without her father's knowledge. It was an immediate success and firmly established Edgeworth's appeal. Set prior to the securing of Irish legislative independence in 1782, the novel is a satire on the corruption and incompetence of Ireland's Protestant gentry. Inspired by a chronicle of Edgeworth's own family, the story of four generations of an Ascendancy family is narrated by a loyal Catholic retainer, their estate steward, Thady Quirk. His recollections portray not only the dissipation of his Protestant masters but also, assisted by their increasing indebtedness, the rise of an Irish catholic middle class. Before its publication, an introduction, glossary and footnotes, written in the voice of an English narrator, were added in effort to offset the danger of the book blunting English enthusiasm for the Act of Union 1800.

Belinda (1801), a 3-volume work published in London, was Maria Edgeworth's first full-length novel. It dealt with love, courtship, and marriage, dramatising the conflicts within her "own personality and environment; conflicts between reason and feeling, restraint and individual freedom, and society and free spirit". Belinda was also notable for its controversial depiction of interracial marriage between a Black servant and an English farmgirl. Later editions of the novel, however, removed these sections. (Note: See Introduction to World Classics edition of Belinda, page xxvii, written by Kathryn Kirkpatrick: "In the 1810 edition of her novel Edgeworth effectively rewrote her representation of romantic relationships between English women and West Indian men, both Creole and African. She felt her novel so changed, she described it to her aunt as 'a twice told tale'. And that she retold her story to omit even the possibility of unions between English women and West Indian men is significant. For it suggests that in order for Belinda to merit inclusion in a series defining the British novel, Edgeworth had to make her colonial characters less visible, less integrated socially into English society. And she certainly had to banish the spectre of inter-racial marriage". Edgeworth herself said she removed the Juba-Lucy interracial marriage "because my father has great delicacies and scruples of conscience about encouraging such marriage".)

Tales of Fashionable Life (1809 and 1812) is a collection of short stories in two series which often focus on the life of a woman. The second series was particularly well received in England, making her the most commercially successful novelist of her age. After this, Edgeworth was regarded as the preeminent female writer in England alongside Jane Austen.

Following an anti-Semitic remark in The Absentee, Edgeworth received a letter from an American Jewish woman named Rachel Mordecai in 1815 complaining about Edgeworth's depiction of Jewish characters. As an amende honorable, she wrote Harrington (1817), a fictitious autobiography of a young English gentleman who is cured of his youthful prejudices–in one of the first sympathetic treatments of Jewish characters in an English novel–by contact with various Jewish characters, particularly a young woman. Set between the passing of the Jewish Naturalisation Act 1753 and the Gordon Riots of 1780, it draws parallels between the discrimination against Jews and the disabilities suffered by Catholics in Ireland.

Helen (1834) is Maria Edgeworth's final novel, the only one she wrote after her father's death. She chose to write a novel focused on the characters and situation, rather than moral lessons. In a letter to her publisher, Maria wrote, "I have been reproached for making my moral in some stories too prominent. I am sensible of the inconvenience of this both to reader and writer & have taken much pains to avoid it in Helen". Her novel is also set in England, a conscious choice as Edgeworth found Ireland too troubling for a fictitious work in the political climate of the 1830s.

=== Style and purpose ===
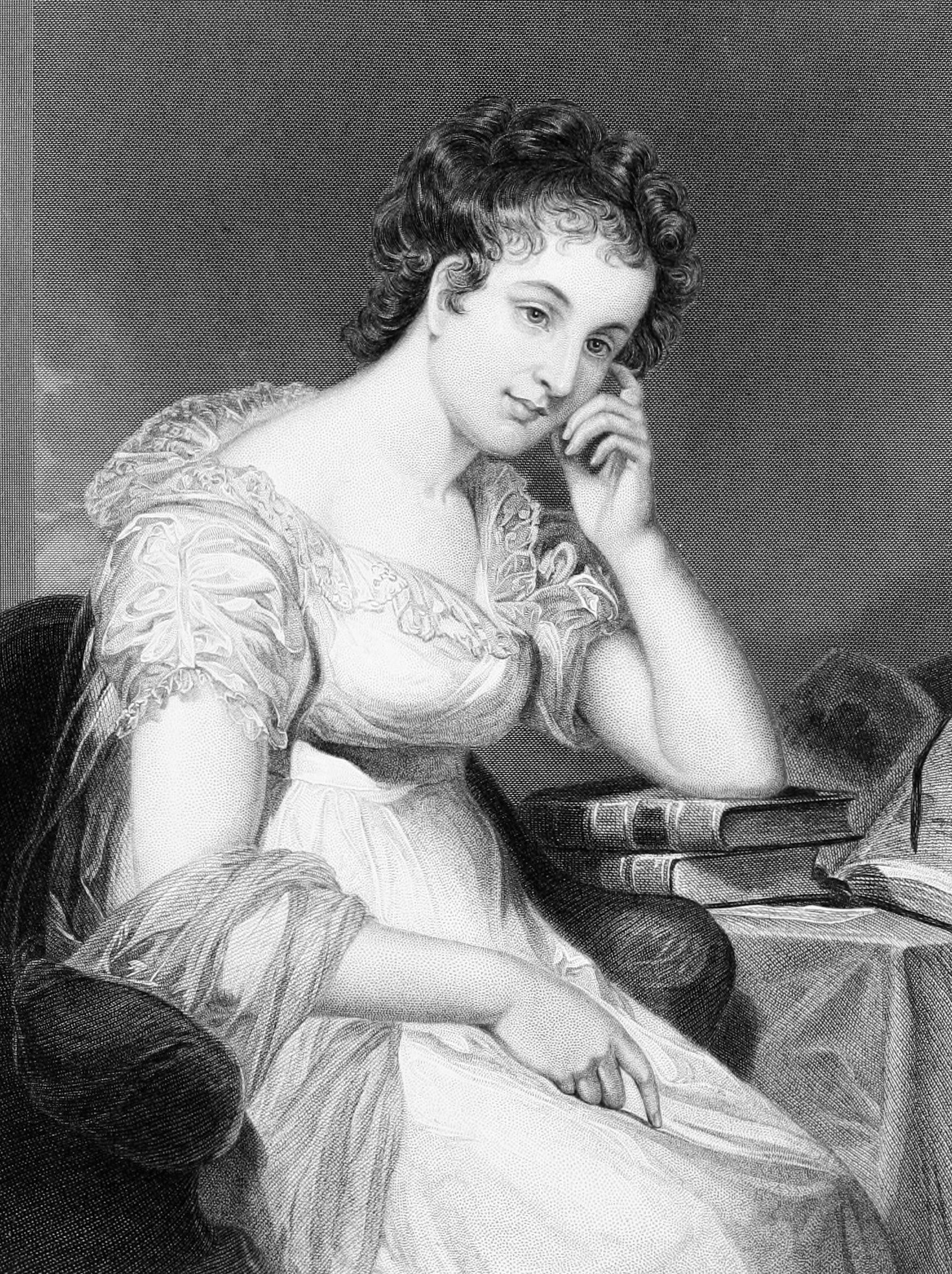
Maria Edgeworth

Having come to her literary maturity at a time when the ubiquitous and unvarying stated defence of the novel was its educative power, Maria Edgeworth was among the few authors who truly espoused the educator's role. Her novels are morally and socially didactic in the extreme. A close analysis of the alterations which Edgeworth's style underwent when it was pressed into the service of overt didacticism should serve to illuminate the relationship between prose technique and didactic purpose in her work. The convention which Maria Edgeworth has adopted and worked to death is basic to the eighteenth-century novel, but its roots lie in the drama, tracing at least to the Renaissance separation of high and low characters by their forms of speech. Throughout the eighteenth-century drama, and most noticeably in the sentimental comedy, the separation becomes more and more a means of moral judgment as well as social identification. The only coherent reason for Edgeworth's acceptance is the appeal of didactic moralism. In the first place, she is willing to suspend judgment wherever the service of the moral is the result. Everything else may go, so long as the lesson is enforced. the lesson might be a warning against moral impropriety, as in Miss Milner's story, or against social injustice, as in The Absentee. Furthermore, the whole reliance on positive exemplars had been justified long before by Richard Steele, who argued that the stage must supply perfect heroes since its examples are imitated and since simple natures are incapable of making the necessary deductions from the negative exemplars of satire.

The characteristic of Edgeworth is to connect an identifiable strain of formal realism, both philosophical and rhetorical, and therefore display an objective interest in human nature and the way it manifests itself in social custom. One would expect this from Edgeworth, an author whose didacticism often has struck modern readers as either gendered liability, technical regression, or familial obligation. Critics have responded to Edgeworth's eccentricities by attributing them to something more deep-seated, temperamental, and psychological. In their various, often insightful representation, Edgeworth's fondness for the real, the strange, and the pedagogically useful verges on the relentless, the obsessive, and the instinctive. There is an alternative literary answer to explain Edgeworth's cultural roots and ideological aims which shifts focus away from Edgeworth's familial, psychological, and cultural predicaments to the formal paradigms by which her work has been judged. Rather than locating Edgeworth's early romances of real life exclusively within the traditions of eighteenth-century children's literature or domestic realism, they can be read primarily as responses to late eighteenth-century debates over the relation between history and romance, because the genre attempts to mediate between the two differentiating itself from other kinds of factual fiction. Edgeworth's romances of real life operate in the same discursive field but do not attempt to traverse between self-denied antinomies. In fact, they usually make the opposite claim.

Edgeworth's repeated self-effacement needs to be seen in the context of the times, where learning in women was often disapproved of and even ridiculed, such as the satirical poem of the Rev. Richard Polwhele, The Unsex'd Females (1798).

The Oxford English Dictionary credits Edgeworth with the earliest published usage of the word "argh."

=== List of published works ===
A partial list of published works:

- "Letters for Literary Ladies". University of Pennsylvania: A Celebration of Women Writers.
  - includes: An Essay on the Noble Science of Self-Justification – 1795
- The Parent's Assistant – 1796
- Practical Education – 1798 (2 vols; collaborated with her father, Richard Lovell Edgeworth and step-mother, Honora Sneyd)
- Castle Rackrent – 1800 (novel)
- Edgeworth, Maria (1801). Early Lessons (1st ed.). London: Johnson.
- Moral Tales for Young People – 1801
- Belinda – 1801 (novel)
- The Mental Thermometer – 1801
- Essay on Irish Bulls – 1802 (political, collaborated with her father)
- Popular Tales – 1804
- The Modern Griselda – 1804
- Leonora – 1806 (written during the French excursion)
- Essays in Professional Education – 1809
- Tales of Fashionable Life – 1809 and 1812 (2 collections of stories, the second of which includes The Absentee)
- Ennui – 1809 (novel)
- The Absentee – 1812 (novel)
- Patronage – 1814 (novel)
- Harrington – 1817 (novel)
- Ormond – 1817 (novel)
- Comic Dramas – 1817
- Memoirs of Richard Lovell Edgeworth – 1820 (edited her father's memoirs)
- Rosamond: A Sequel to Early Lessons – 1821
- Frank: A Sequel to Frank in Early Lessons – 1822
- Tomorrow – 1823 (novel)
- Harry and Lucy concluded – 1825 (novel)
- Helen – 1834 (novel)
- Orlandino – 1848 (temperance novel)
- Tales and novels. In 9 volumes - 1848
  - (Vol. I) (Digital version)
  - Vol. II: Popular tales (Digital version)
  - Vol. III: Belinda (Digital version)
  - Vol. IV: Containing Caste Rackrent; An essay on Irish bulls, An essay on The noble science of self-justification; Ennui; and The dun (Digital version)
  - Vol. V: Manœvering; Almeria; and Vivian (Digital version)
  - Vol. VI: The absentee; Madame de Fleury; Emilie de Coulanges; and The modern Griselda (Digital version)
  - Vol. VII: Patronage (Digital version)
  - Vol. VIII: Patronage, concluded; Comic drama; Leonora; and Letters (Digital version)
  - Vol. IX: Harrington; Thought on bores; and Ormond (Digital version)

Also:

- Edgeworth, Maria (1820). "RL Edgeworth Esq". The Annual Register. Part II: 1215–1223.
- Edgeworth, Maria (2013). Complete Novels of Maria Edgeworth (Illustrated). Delphi Classics.
- Hall, S. C. (1849). "Edgeworthstown: Memories of Maria Edgeworth". Living Age. 22: 320–329.

== Legacy ==
During the period 1800–1814 (when Walter Scott's Waverley was published) Edgeworth was the most celebrated and successful living English novelist. Her reputation equalled that of Fanny Burney (Madame d'Arblay) (1752–1840) earlier, in a time that saw a number of other female writers including Elizabeth Hamilton, Amelia Opie, Hannah More and Elizabeth Inchbald. Her only potential male competitor prior to Scott was William Godwin. She was certainly well received by the critics and literary figures of her time. Croker (1780–1857) compared her work to Don Quixote and Gil Blas and to the work of Henry Fielding, while Francis Jeffrey (1773–1850) called her work 'perfect'.

The Ulster Gaelic Society, established in 1830, succeeded in a single publication in its history, namely the translation into Irish of two stories by Maria Edgeworth: Tomás Ó Fiannachtaigh translated Forgive and Forget and Rosanna into Irish in the 1830s.

An hour-long monologue based on her letters, performed by Edith Evans, was broadcast on BBC Radio 3 in 1967 and again in 2026 on BBC Radio 4 Extra.

== Sources ==
- Butler, Marilyn (1972). Maria Edgeworth: A Literary Biography. Oxford University Press. ISBN 978-0198120179.
- Edgeworth, Maria; Lovell, Richard (1798). Practical Education. London: J. Johnson.
- Fauske, Chris; Kaufman, Heidi, eds. (2004). An Uncomfortable Authority. Newark: University of Delaware Press.
- Harden, Elizabeth (1984). Maria Edgeworth. Boston: Twayne Publishers. ISBN 9780805768794.
- McCormack, W. J. (2015). "Edgeworth, Maria (1768–1849), novelist and educationist". Oxford Dictionary of National Biography (online ed.). Oxford University Press. doi:10.1093/ref:odnb/8476. (Subscription, Wikipedia Library access or UK public library membership required.)
- Nash, Julie, ed. (2006). New Essays on Maria Edgeworth. Ashgate Publishing, Ltd. p. 59. ISBN 978-0-7546-5175-8.
- "Maria Edgeworth: Anglo-Irish author". Encyclopædia Britannica. 2014.
- "Edgeworth Papers. Collection List 40" (PDF). National Library of Ireland. p. 112.
- "Edgeworth Collection (Longford County Library)". Ask About Ireland.
- "Edgeworth, Maria (1768–1849), novelist and children's writer". The National Archives (UK).
