= The Absentee (novel) =

1812 novel by Maria Edgeworth

- Author: Maria Edgeworth
- Language: English
- Genre: Novel
- Publication date: 1812
- Publication place: Ireland
- Pages: 320 (Penguin classics, paperback)
- ISBN: 978-0140436457

The Absentee is a novel by Maria Edgeworth, published in 1812 in Tales of Fashionable Life, that expresses the systemic evils of the absentee landlord class of Anglo-Irish and the desperate condition of the Irish peasantry. There are many turns of plot and much information about Ireland as well as Irish dialect and details of shallow London fashionable life, and the egregious results of the propertied classes treating their Irish lands as a resource to be exploited rather than as a relationship among classes and with the land. In this respect, it addresses similar themes to her first novel, Castle Rackrent.

== Plot summary ==
Just before coming of age, Lord Colambre, the sensitive hero of the novel, finds that his mother Lady Clonbrony's attempts to buy her way into the high society of London are only ridiculed, while his father, Lord Clonbrony, is in serious debt as a result of his wife's lifestyle and his own lack of responsibility. The moneylender Mordecai who threatens foreclosure on him is represented with a Jew-hatred typical of the period. Colambre's mother wishes him to marry an heiress, Miss Broadhurst, who is a friend of Grace Nugent. However, Colambre has already fallen in love with his cousin, Grace Nugent, who lives with the family as a companion to Lady Clonbrony. Worried that his mother will pressure him into a marriage with someone he does not love, Colambre decides to leave the London social scene and visit his ancestral home in County Wicklow in Ireland.

Upon arriving in Dublin, Colambre becomes good friends with Sir James Brooke, who is a good influence on Colambre and warns him against the schemes of some new arrivals on the Dublin social scene: Lady Dashfort and her widowed daughter, Lady Isobel. It is generally known that Lady Dashfort is looking to ensnare a new, rich Irish peer for her equally unscrupulous daughter, and by any means necessary. Despite a pointed warning from Sir James, Colambre falls under the influence of the persuasive Lady Dashfort, who wishes to secure him as the next husband for Lady Isobel. Chance intelligence from a former maid in the Clonbrony household reveals to Lady Dashfort that Lord Colambre is, in fact, in love with his cousin, Grace Nugent. To discourage the match, Lady Dashfort slyly lets slip that Grace was born out of wedlock, and is therefore illegitimate. This is confirmed by letter by his mother, who while a social climber and generally frivolous, is very loving to Grace and has never told her about her parentage. Colambre is heartbroken and feels he can never love a woman with such a heritage.

He visits his family estate and discovers that his father's agents are oppressing the local peasantry and probably cheating his father as well. He reveals himself to the agents, and there is a race back to London, Colambre trying to stop his father from signing documents that would ruin some of the good peasants, (and would swindle Clonbrony and Colambre), the agents trying to get the papers signed.

Colambre makes it back just in time to stop his father from ruin, and he then assists his father in paying off his debts, on condition that the Clonbrony family returns to live in Ireland.

The final section concerns Colambre's love for Grace and how it is discovered that she is both legitimate and an heiress.
