= Castle Rackrent =

1800 novel by Maria Edgeworth

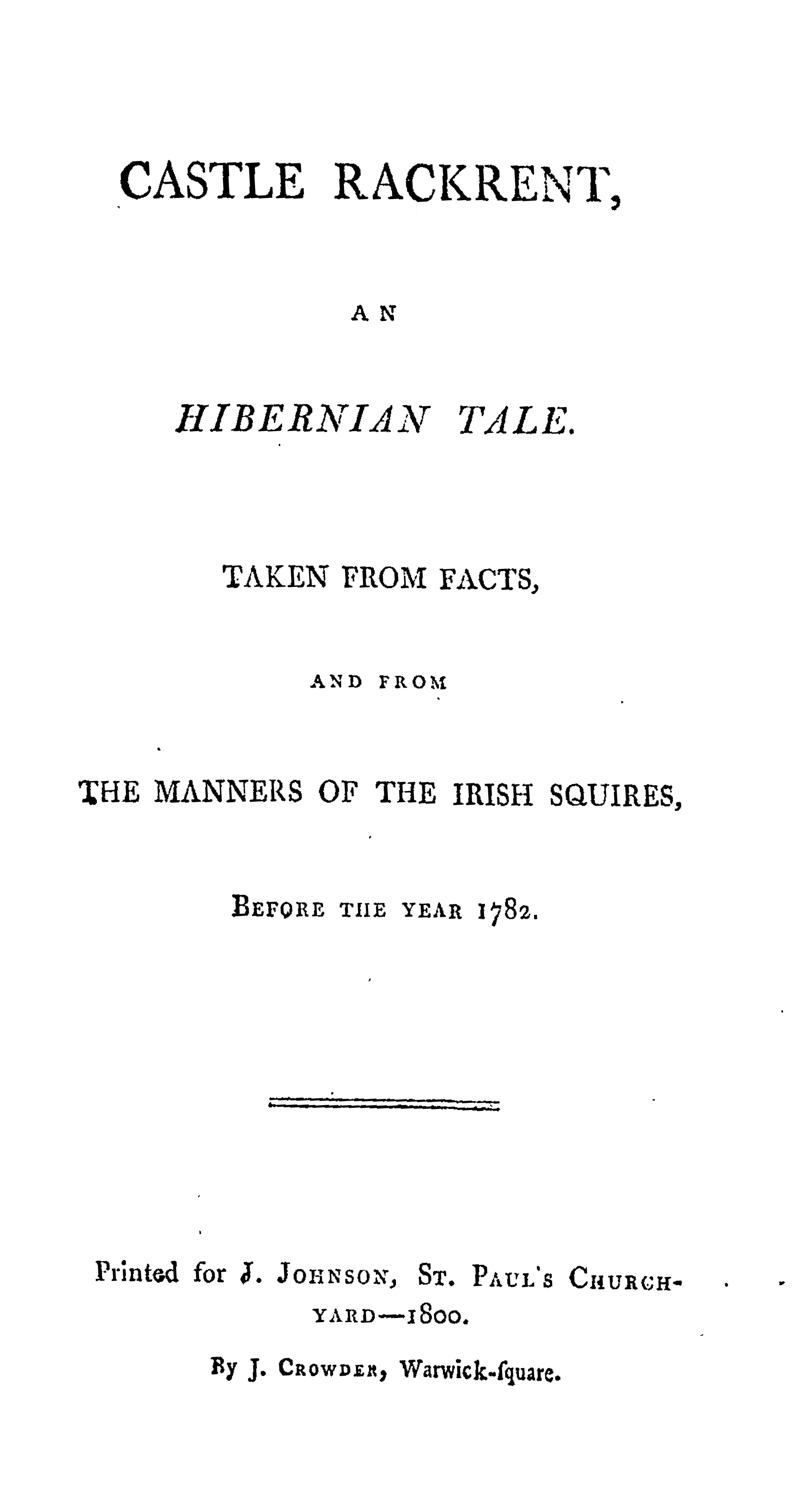
- Title page of the first edition.
- Author: Maria Edgeworth
- Language: English
- Genre: Historical novel
- Publisher: J. Johnson
- Publication date: 1800
- Publication place: Ireland
- Media type: Print (hardback and paperback)
- Pages: 90
- Text: Castle Rackrent online

Castle Rackrent is a short novel by Maria Edgeworth published in 1800. Unlike many of her other novels, which were heavily "edited" by her father, Richard Lovell Edgeworth, before their publication, the published version is close to her original intention.

Shortly before its publication, an introduction, glossary and footnotes, written in the voice of an English narrator, were added to the original text to blunt the negative impact the Edgeworths feared the book might have on English enthusiasm for the Act of Union 1800. One of the main sources of inspiration for the novel was a chronicle of her own family history called The Black Book of Edgeworthstown, which contain legal struggles of the Edgeworths similar to those portrayed in the novel.

== Plot summary ==
The novel is set prior to the Constitution of 1782. It tells the story of four generations of Rackrent heirs through their steward, Thady Quirk. The heirs are: the dissipated spendthrift Sir Patrick O'Shaughlin, the litigious Sir Murtagh Rackrent, the cruel husband and gambling absentee Sir Kit Rackrent, and the generous but improvident Sir Condy Rackrent. Their sequential mismanagement of the estate is resolved through the machinations—and to the benefit—of the narrator's astute son, Jason Quirk.

== Characters ==
- Thady Quirk is the family steward of the Rackrent family. He serves as the narrator to the novel.
- Sir Patrick O'Shaughlin, a gentlemen who agrees to change his surname and bear the Rackrent arms in order to inherit the Castle.
- Sir Murtagh Rackrent, the heir to Sir Patrick, who is prone to suing his tenants over property ownership.
- Sir Kit Rackrent, the younger brother of Sir Murtagh. He is a repeat philanderer, and eventually dies in a duel.
- Jessica Rackrent, the wife of Sir Kit. She is locked in her room by her husband for seven years, until his death.
- Sir Conolly 'Condy' Rackrent, the successor to Sir Kit. A well-loved landlord, he loses the castle due to debts and eventually dies of fever.
- Isabella Moneygawl Rackrent, the wife of Sir Conolly. She is disinherited upon her marriage and becomes a spendthrift.
- Jason Quirk is an estate clerk who ultimately becomes an attorney. He is the son of Thady Quirk.
- Judy Quirk is the grandniece of Thady Quirk. She ultimately marries a huntsman.

== Themes and style ==
Kathryn Kirkpatrick suggests that the novel "both borrows from and originates a variety of literary genres and subgenres without neatly fitting into any one of them". It satirises Anglo-Irish landlords and their overall mismanagement of the estates they owned at a time when the British and Irish parliaments were working towards formalising their union through the Acts of Union. Through this and other works, Edgeworth is credited with serving the political, national interests of Ireland and the United Kingdom the way Sir Walter Scott did for Scotland.

Castle Rackrent is a dialogic novel, comprising a preface and conclusion by an editor bookending a first person narrative proper. It is widely regarded as the first Irish novel to use the device of a narrator who is both unreliable and an observer of, rather than a player in, the actions he chronicles. It also has a glossary (which was a last-minute addition).

== Importance ==
Castle Rackrent is sometimes regarded as the first historical novel, the first regional novel in English, the first Anglo-Irish novel, the first Big House novel, and the first saga novel. William Butler Yeats pronounced Castle Rackrent "one of the most inspired chronicles written in English". Sir Walter Scott, who met and carried on a correspondence with Edgeworth, credited her novel for inspiring him to write his Waverley series of novels:

Without being so presumptuous as to hope to emulate the rich humour, pathetic tenderness, and admirable tact, which pervade the works of my accomplished friend, I felt that something might be attempted for my own country, of the same kind with that which Miss Edgeworth so fortunately achieved for Ireland—something which might introduce her natives to those of the sister kingdom in a more favourable light than they have been placed hitherto.

The novel is alluded to in The Great Gatsby by F. Scott Fitzgerald, A Mother in History by Jean Stafford and Milkman by Anna Burns.

== See also ==
- Knocknagow, a popular 1873 novel by Charles Kickham about the life of the Irish peasantry and workings of the Irish land system.
