= Sentimental novel =

Genre of literature that relied on emotional response

The sentimental novel or the novel of sensibility is an 18th- and 19th-century literary genre that presents and celebrates the concepts of sentiment, sentimentalism, and sensibility. Sentimentalism, which is to be distinguished from sensibility, was a fashion in both poetry and prose fiction beginning in the eighteenth century in reaction to the rationalism of the Augustan Age.

Sentimental novels relied on emotional response, both from their readers and characters. They feature scenes of distress and tenderness, and the plot is arranged to advance both emotions and actions. The result is a valorization of "fine feeling", displaying the characters as a model for refined, sensitive emotional effect. The ability to display feelings was thought to show character and experience, and to shape social life and relations.

== History ==
Among the most famous sentimental novels in English are Samuel Richardson's Pamela, or Virtue Rewarded (1740), Oliver Goldsmith's Vicar of Wakefield (1766), Laurence Sterne's A Sentimental Journey (1768), Henry Brooke's The Fool of Quality (1765–1770), Henry Mackenzie's The Man of Feeling (1771) and Maria Edgeworth's Castle Rackrent (1800). Continental examples are Jean-Jacques Rousseau's novel Julie, or the New Heloise, his autobiography The Confessions (1764–1770) and Goethe's novel The Sorrows of Young Werther (1774). Tobias Smollett tried to imply a darker underside to the "cult of sensibility" in his The Expedition of Humphry Clinker (1771). Another example of this type of novel is Frances Burney's Evelina (1778), wherein the heroine, while naturally good, in part for being country-raised, hones her politeness when, while visiting London, she is educated into propriety. This novel also is the beginning of "romantic comedy", though it is most appropriately labeled a conduct novel and a forerunner of the female Bildungsroman in the English tradition exemplified by later writers such as Jane Austen, Charlotte Brontë, and George Eliot.

While this genre is particularly associated with the second half of the 18th century, it continued in a modified form into the 19th century, especially in the works of Mrs. Henry Wood, who is remembered especially for East Lynne (1861). However, the question as to whether Charles Dickens is a sentimental novelist is more debatable. Valerie Purton in her 2012 book Dickens and the Sentimental Tradition, sees him continuing aspects of this tradition, and argues that his "sentimental scenes and characters [are] as crucial to the overall power of the novels as his darker or comic figures and scenes", and that "Dombey and Son is ... Dickens's greatest triumph in the sentimentalist tradition". On the other hand, the Encyclopædia Britannica online comments, that despite "patches of emotional excess", such as the reported death of Tiny Tim in A Christmas Carol (1843), "Dickens cannot really be termed a sentimental novelist".

The first sentimental novel to be published in the United States, William Hill Brown's The Power of Sympathy, appeared in 1791 and dealt with themes of nationhood, seduction, and incest. Hill's novel was followed by Hannah Webster Foster's immensely popular The Coquette, whose events were loosely based on the tragic biography of Massachusetts native Elizabeth Whitman, who gave birth to an illegitimate child and died soon after at a roadside tavern. The American sentimental novel achieved massive sales and popularity during the Antebellum era. Landmark examples include Susan Warner's The Wide, Wide World (1850), Harriet Beecher Stowe's Uncle Tom's Cabin (1852), Elizabeth Stuart Phelps's The Gates Ajar (1869), and Maria Cummins's The Lamplighter (1854).

Sentimental novels also gave rise to the subgenre of domestic fiction in the early nineteenth century, commonly called conduct novels. The story's hero in domestic fiction is generally set in a domestic world and centers on a woman going through various types of hardship, and who is juxtaposed with either a foolish and passive or a woefully undereducated woman. The contrast between the heroic woman's actions and her foils is meant to draw sympathy to the character's plight and to instruct them about expected conduct of women. The domestic novel uses sentimentalism as a tool to convince readers of the importance of its message.

By the end of the 19th century, sentimental literature faced complaints about the abundance of "cheap sentiment" and its excessive bodily display. Critics, and eventually the public, began to see sentimentalism manifested in society as unhealthy physical symptoms such as nervousness and being overly sensitive, and the genre began declining sharply in popularity.

== The satirizing of sentimentalism ==
The novelist Henry Fielding, known later for his novel The History of Tom Jones, a Foundling (1749), satirized the sentimental style in his early novels Shamela (1741) and Joseph Andrews (1742).

Jane Austen's Sense and Sensibility (1811) is most often seen as a "witty satire of the sentimental novel", by juxtaposing values of the Age of Enlightenment (sense, reason) with those of the later eighteenth century (sensibility, feeling) while exploring the larger realities of women's lives, especially through concerns with marriage and inheritance. This reading of Sense and Sensibility specifically and Austen's fiction in general has been complicated and revised by recent critics such as Claudia L. Johnson (Jane Austen: Women, Politics and the Novel (1988) and Equivocal Beings: Politics, Gender, and Sentimentality in the 1790s (1995)), Jillian Heydt-Stevenson (Austen's Unbecoming Conjunctions (2005)), and Christopher C. Nagle (Sexuality and the Culture of Sensibility in the British Romantic Era (2007)), all of whom see unruly and even subversive energies at play in her work, inspired by the sentimental tradition.

James Joyce parodies the sentimental novel in the "Nausicaa" episode of Ulysses (1918–1920). The character of Gerty MacDowell was inspired by the protagonist of The Lamplighter (1854), a nineteenth-century best-seller.

== Cultural aspects ==
The sentimental novel complemented social trends of the time toward humanism and the heightened value of human life. The literature focused on weaker members of society, such as orphans and condemned criminals, and allowed readers to identify and sympathize with them. This translated to growing sentimentalism within society, and led to social movements calling for change, such as the abolition of the death penalty and of slavery. Instead of the death penalty, popular sentiment called for the rehabilitation of criminals, rather than harsh punishment. The speech by the playwright Sheridan in The Columbian Orator, detailing a fictional dialogue between a master and slave, inspired Frederick Douglass to stand against his own bondage—and slavery in general—in his famous Narrative.

Johann Wolfgang von Goethe's 1774 The Sorrows of Young Werther was highly sentimental and immediately extremely popular throughout Europe, and even inspired young people who could relate to Werther's sorrows to commit suicide. It is also an excellent example of an epistolary novel, an especially typical form for eighteenth-century novels of sensibility, beginning with the influential novels of Samuel Richardson, Pamela (1740), Clarissa (1748), and The History of Sir Charles Grandison (1753). The latter was an especially important influence on Jane Austen, who refers to it repeatedly in her letters and began a dramatic adaptation of the work for the amusement of her family.

== Gothic novel ==
The Gothic novel's story occurs in a distant time and place, often Medieval or Renaissance Europe (especially Italy and Spain), and involved the fantastic exploits of a virtuous heroine imperiled by dark, tyrannical forces beyond her control. The first Gothic novel is Horace Walpole's The Castle of Otranto (1764), but its most famous and popular practitioner was Ann Radcliffe, whose early Gothic novels in the 1790s maintain the fashion.

Eighteenth-century aesthetic theory, following Edmund Burke, held that the sublime and the beautiful were juxtaposed. The sublime was awful (awe-inspiring) and terrifying while the beautiful was calm and reassuring. The characters and landscapes of the Gothic rest almost entirely within the sublime, with the heroine serving as the great exception. The “beautiful” heroine's susceptibility to supernatural elements, integral to these novels, both celebrates and problematizes what came to be seen as hyper-sensibility.

=== Relation to the Gothic novel ===
Gothic and sentimental novels are considered a form of popular fiction, reaching their height of popularity in the late 18th century. They reflected a popular shift from Neoclassical ideas of order and reason to emotion and imagination. Popular stylistic elements, such as the "discovery" of the original manuscript by the author (as in Walpole's The Castle of Otranto) or creating fragmented works by combining disjointed tales (seen in Sterne's A Sentimental Journey) were meant to suggest to the reader that there was no act of artistic creation to distort reality between the reader and the work, or that the emotional intensity and sincerity remained intact.

== See also ==
- Domestic realism
