= Domestic realism =

Domestic realism normally refers to the genre of 19th-century fictional works about the daily lives of ordinary Victorian women. This body of writing is also known as "sentimental fiction" or "woman's fiction". The genre is mainly reflected in the novel though short-stories and non-fiction works such as Harriet Beecher Stowe's "Our Country Neighbors" and The New Housekeeper's Manual written by Stowe and her sister Catharine Beecher are works of domestic realism.

== Generic conventions ==
The style's particular characteristics are:

1. "Plot focuses on a heroine who embodies one of two types of exemplar: the angel and the practical woman (Reynolds) who sometimes exist in the same work. Baym says that this heroine is contrasted with the passive woman (incompetent, cowardly, ignorant; often the heroine's mother is this type) and the "belle," who is deprived of a proper education.
2. The heroine struggles for self-mastery, learning the pain of conquering her own passions (Tompkins, Sensational Designs, 172).
3. The heroine learns to balance society's demands for self-denial with her own desire for autonomy, a struggle often addressed in terms of religion.
4. She suffers at the hands of abusers of power before establishing a network of surrogate kin.
5. The plots "repeatedly identify immersion in feeling as one of the great temptations and dangers for a developing woman. They show that feeling must be controlled. . . " (Baym 25). Frances Cogan notes that the heroines thus undergo a full education within which to realize feminine obligations (The All-American Girl).
6. The tales generally end with marriage, usually one of two possible kinds:
  - Reforming the bad or "wild" male, as in Augusta Evans's St. Elmo (1867)
  - Marrying the solid male who already meets her qualifications. Examples: Maria Cummins, The Lamplighter (1854) and Susan Warner, The Wide, Wide World (1850)
7. The novels may use a "language of tears" that evokes sympathy from the readers.
8. Richard Brodhead (Cultures of Letters) sees class as an important issue, as the ideal family or heroine is poised between a lower-class family exemplifying poverty and domestic disorganization and upper-class characters exemplifying an idle, frivolous existence (94)."

== Examples ==
An example of this style of novel is Jane Smiley's A Thousand Acres, in which the main character's confinement is emphasized in such a way.

Some early exponents of the genre of domestic realism were Jane Austen and Elizabeth Barrett Browning.
