= The Italian Father =

The Italian Father: A Comedy, in Five Acts (1799) is an American comedic play by William Dunlap, though substantially adapted from Part II of The Honest Whore (c. 1606) by Thomas Dekker.

Dunlap considered it his best play. It was popular with the public at the time (who mistakenly believed it to be a translation of August von Kotzebue and approved it accordingly as a great work), and considered positively by modern critics. It debuted at the Park Theatre in New York City on April 15, 1799, and played for three performances that season. It also played in Boston in the fall, and was revived in New York for one performance in 1802.

The play was published in 1810, wherein Dunlap admitted he had "enriched his work" from old English sources but claimed it was "without forfeiting his claim to originality in the composition." When writing his History of the American Theatre twenty years after that, Dunlap admitted that "Decker furnished many of the finest passages in this drama."

The 1830 play The Deformed by Richard Penn Smith is based both on The Honest Whore and Dunlap's adaptation.

== Original New York cast ==
- Michael Brazzo (the father) by Joseph Tyler
- Beraldo by Thomas Apthorpe Cooper
- Hippolito by John Martin
- Lodovico by William Bates
- Fool by Joseph Jefferson (grandfather of Joseph Jefferson (1829-1905))
- Carlo by Miller
- Beatrice by Eleanor Westray ("Miss E. Westray")
- Astrabel by Mrs. Giles Leonard Barrett ("Mrs. Barrett")
- Leonora by Georgina George Oldmixon ("Mrs. Oldmixon")
