= Christiana Douglas =

Scottish novelist (1822–1887)

- Born: 1822; Kelso
- Died: 1887
- Occupation: Novelist
- Spouse: Charles Greenall Davies
- Father: Pringle Home Douglas

Christiana Jane Douglas Davies (1822 – 1887) was a Scottish novelist of domestic novels.

Christiana Douglas was born in 1822 in Kelso, Scotland, the daughter of Commander Pringle Home Douglas of the Royal Navy. She initially published her novels anonymously to avoid her father's disapproval. She married the Rev. Charles Greenall Davies, Vicar of Tewkesbury. After her husband's death, she lived in Maida Hill, London. She died in 1887.

== Bibliography ==
1. Honour and Shame: A Novel. 3 vol. London: Bentley, 1845.
2. Anne Dysart: A Tale of Every-day Life. 3 vol. London: Henry Colburn, 1850.
3. The Heir of Ardennan: A Story of Domestic Life in Scotland. 3 vol. London: Henry Colburn, 1852.
4. The History of Herbert Lake. 3 vol. London: Hurst and Blackett, 1854.
5. Rosa Grey: or, The Officer's Daughter. 3 vol. London: Hurst and Blackett, 1857.
6. Onwards. 3 vol. London: Hurst and Blackett, 1859.
7. The Browns and the Smiths. 2 vol. London: Hurst and Blackett, 1863.
8. Arthur. 3 vol. London: Hurst and Blackett, 1870.
9. Father Godfrey. 3 vol. London: Hurst and Blackett, 1872.
10. Mr. Charlton: A Novel. 3 vol. London: Hurst and Blackett, 1877.
11. Sir John. 3 vol. London: Hurst and Blackett, 1879.
12. Marion's Married Life. 3 vol. London: Hurst and Blackett, 1886.
