= Haymarket Theatre (disambiguation) =

The Theatre Royal Haymarket is a West End theatre in London.

Haymarket Theatre may also refer to:

- Haymarket Theatre (Boston)
- Haymarket Theatre (Leicester)
- Haymarket Theatre, Melbourne (1862–1871)
