= Adaliza Cutter Phelps =

American poet

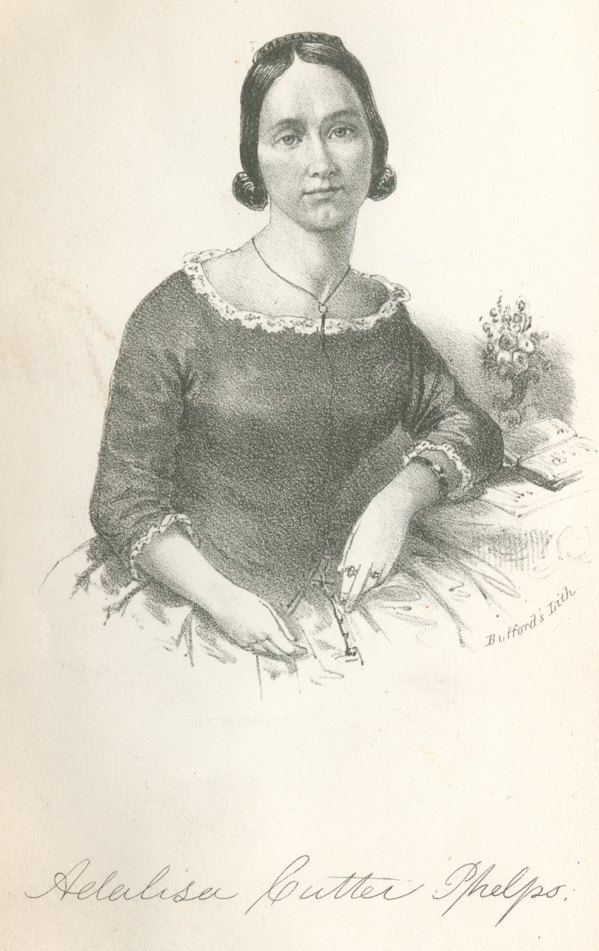
Portrait of Adaliza Phelps from the frontispiece of The Life of Christ and Other Poems

Adaliza Cutter Phelps (1823 - June 3, 1852) was an American poet.

Phelps was a native of Jaffrey, New Hampshire, and remained a resident of that town for the entirety of her life. She was the third of five siblings; her eldest sister had also been a poet, and both of her older sisters died in their twenties. She also had two younger brothers. She was married. Phelps wrote poetry for private amusement, without either the desire or the financial need to submit it for publication. Much of her writing centers on religious topics, but she herself never publicly declared allegiance to a church until joining the Congregational Church near the end of her life. A volume of collected poetry by Phelps, The Life of Christ and Other Poems, was published posthumously in Boston in 1852 by request of her friends; brought out by John P. Jewett and Company, it contains an introduction by her husband.
