= John P. Jewett =

John Punchard Jewett (1814–1884) was a Boston publisher, best known for first publishing Uncle Tom's Cabin in book form in 1852. Jewett was a brother of librarian Charles Coffin Jewett.

Jewett started a business in Boston publishing textbooks and religious textbooks in 1846, in addition to "egalitarian" pieces. By 1851, he had also moved into fiction, publishing The Sunny Side by Elizabeth Stuart Phelps (the mother of Elizabeth Stuart Phelps Ward). In late 1851, along with his half-brother H. P. B. Jewett and partners Proctor and Worthington, he formed a second publishing business in Cleveland, which took on the responsibility of selling Uncle Tom's Cabin in the west.

Upon the urgings of his wife that it would sell well, he acquired the rights to Uncle Tom's Cabin in 1852. It sold over 300,000 copies that same year.

In 1854, Jewett published another bestseller, The Lamplighter by Maria Susanna Cummins. The continuing demand for these two books required Jewett to borrow capital, which led him to have to declare bankruptcy due to the Panic of 1857. By mid-1860 he was out of the publishing field for good.
