= The Honest Whore =

17th-century comedy play

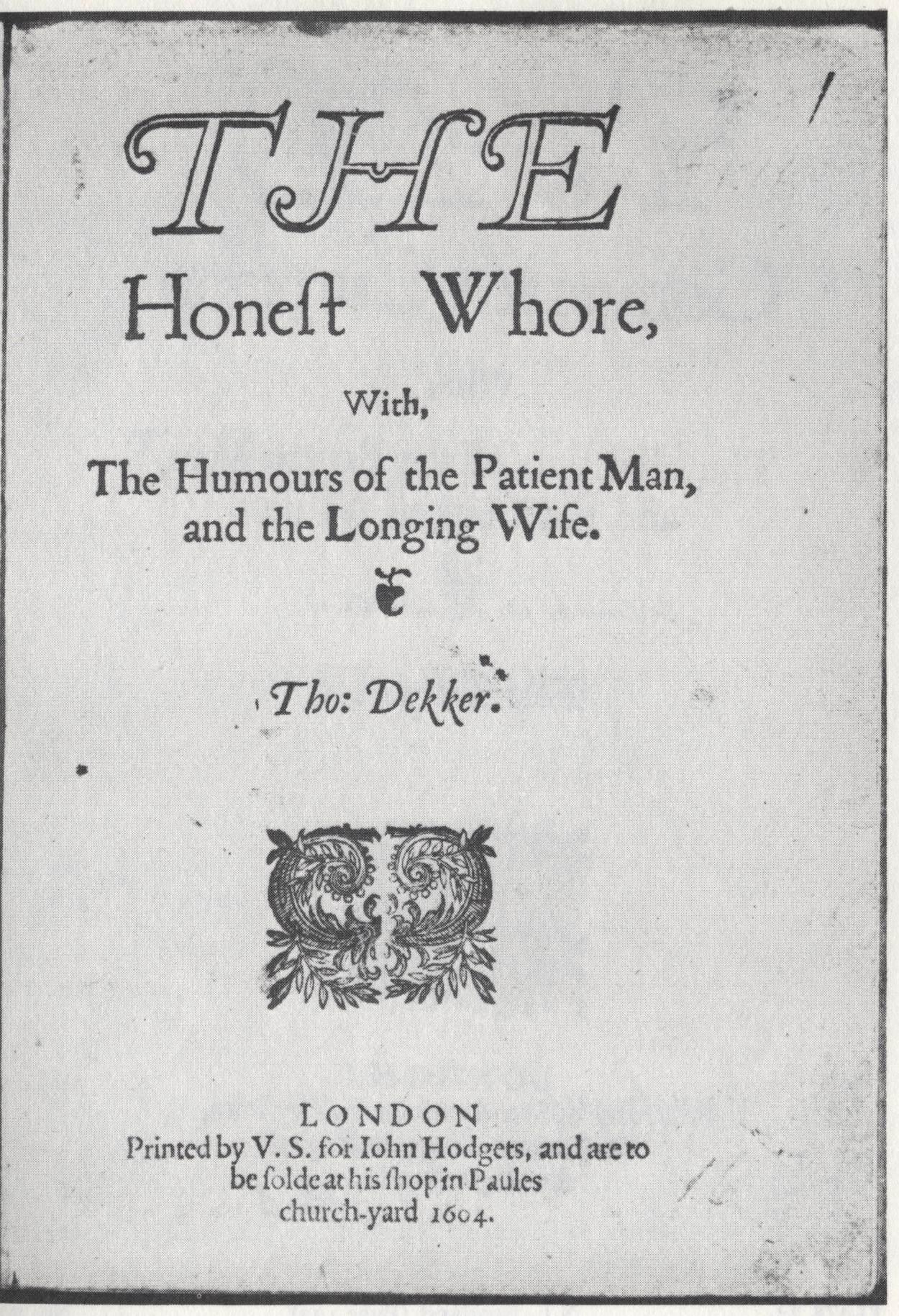
Title page of the 1604 quarto edition of The Honest Whore, Part One.

The Honest Whore is an early Jacobean city comedy, written in two parts; Part 1 is a collaboration between Thomas Dekker and Thomas Middleton, while Part 2 is the work of Dekker alone. The plays were acted by the Admiral's Men.

== Part 1 ==
=== Production ===
The Honest Whore, Part 1 was entered into the Stationers' Register on 9 November 1604; the first quarto was published later the same year, printed by Valentine Simmes for the bookseller John Hodges. Subsequent quartos of the popular play appeared in 1605, 1606, and 1616; a fifth quarto was published without a date. Q6 was issued in 1635, printed by Nicholas Okes for the bookseller Richard Collins.

Scholars have debated the extent of Middleton's contribution to Part 1. David Lake's analysis of the play gives most of it to Dekker, with Middleton's contribution strongest in Act I and the first scene in Act III, and with sporadic input elsewhere.

The Oxford Dictionary of National Biography reports, under Thomas Middleton, that Part I was performed outside at the Fortune Theatre by Prince Henry's Men. This London premier in 1604 of The Honest Whore, Part I is verified in the Annals of English Drama.

=== Characters ===
- Gaspero Trebazzi, the Duke of Milan
- Infelice, daughter to the Duke
- Hippolito, young man in love with Infelice
- Matteo, Hippolito's friend
- Bellafront, the honest whore
- Castruccio, Pioratto, Fluello and Sinezi, gallants
- Doctor Benedict
- Candido, a linen-draper
- Viola, Candido's Wife
- George, journeyman to Candido
- Fustigo, brother to Candido's Wife
- Two apprentices to Candido
- Roger, servant to Bellafront
- Mistress Fingerlock, a woman who maintains a brothel
- Crambo and Poh, bravoes
- Hippolito's servant
- Doctor Benedict's servant
- Porter
- Father Anselmo
- Sweeper
- Three Madmen
- Officers, Gentlemen

=== Synopsis ===
Scene 1: The streets of Milan, a funeral procession
The play begins with a funeral procession for the Duke of Milan's daughter, Infelice. The procession is attended by the Duke and several others. Infelice's former lover, Hippolito enters. Extremely upset, he insists that Infelice is not truly dead and demands to see the body. His friend Matteo holds him back and tries to calm him down. The procession exits, but the Duke, Hippolito and Matteo stay behind. The Duke commends Matteo's efforts to control Hippolito and exits. Hippolito continues raging. He swears that he will never love any other woman. Matteo scoffs at his friend's oath and predicts that Hippolito will forget about Infelice and visit a brothel within the next ten days.

Scene 2: Outside Candido's home
Fustigo has just returned from sea, and he is totally broke. He sends a porter to fetch his sister, Viola, who has recently married Candido, a wealthy (and very patient) linen-draper. Viola enters. Fustigo begs her to give him some money and Viola agrees to help him out on condition that he do a service for her in return. She explains that, although she is generally satisfied in her marriage, her husband, Candido, is even-tempered to a fault. Nothing can move him to anger. Her greatest wish is to see her husband throw an explosive fit. With this goal in mind, she instructs Fustigo to pose as a "wide-mouthed swaggerer" and attempt to annoy Candido by stealing things, kissing Viola, etc. Fustigo agrees to go along with the plan. Viola twice reminds Fustigo that he must return any items he might steal during the course of the ruse.

Scene 3: A private chamber in the Duke's castle
The Duke orders his servants to lock all the doors and warns them not to utter a word of what they are about to see. It is soon revealed that—as Hippolito had predicted—Infelice is not actually dead. As part of a scheme to break up her romance with Hippolito, the Duke ordered Doctor Benedict to give Infelice a drug that created a temporary appearance of death (the Duke dislikes Hippolito because he is related to one of the Duke's enemies). The Doctor assures the Duke that Infelice will awaken unharmed momentarily. A curtain is pulled back, her body is revealed, and she awakens. The Duke tells her that she fell sick for several days after a messenger announced news of Hippolito's death. Infelice is skeptical of this story and accuses her father of murdering Hippolito. Brushing her accusations aside, the Duke tells Infelice she will be sent to Bergamo to mourn and recuperate in peace. Infelice exits. The Duke wishes aloud that Hippolito were truly dead. The Doctor tells him that he is friendly with Hippolito and could poison him quite easily: the Duke orders the Doctor to do so.

Scene 4: Outside Candido's shop
Castruccio tells Fluello and Pioratto that he has devised a scheme that will send the "monstrously patient" Candido into a fit of temper. Pioratto says that it would take more than a simple jest to vex the immovable Candido. Castruccio offers a 100-ducat wager that his scheme will work and Pioratto accepts the bet.

Scene 5: Candido's shop
The gallants Castruccio, Fluello and Pioratto enter Candido's shop. Candido's apprentice George shows them various garments and fabrics, but they reject everything they see as unfit. Candido enters and patiently describes the quality of his wares. Castruccio says he would like to purchase a penny's worth of fabric. Candido protests that a penny's worth is an absurdly small amount. Castruccio feigns offense and threatens to leave. Candido agrees to give him what he wants. Castruccio insists that his bit of fabric should be cut out from the middle of the roll, rather than from the corner. Candido patiently complies with Castruccio's request. Viola grumbles about the stupidity of Candido's patience. Candido encourages the gallants to ignore his wife's complaints. Whispering, Pioratto tells Castruccio that he has lost the 100-ducat bet. Fluello marvels at Candido's amazing patience. Candido explains that it is simply prudent business practice to satisfy a customer's demands—even if it means taking a loss every once in a while. To further demonstrate his goodwill, Candido orders some wine and drinks to the gallants' health. Rather than drinking, Viola deliberately spills her wine on the floor. Candido orders George to refill her beaker. Speaking aside, Fluello tells Castruccio that he will steal an expensive wine beaker in order to annoy Candido. The gallants finish their wine and propose another toast, but Candido refuses to take a second drink. Fluello threatens to take the wine beaker with him if Candido won't drink. Unperturbed, Candido tells him to go ahead and take the beaker. The gallants exit, amazed at Candido's patience. Viola scolds Candido for allowing the gallants to steal the expensive beaker. Candido tells his wife to calm down. He orders his apprentice to quietly fetch the constable, but warns him not to make any accusations because the "gentlemen" were likely only joking, and he does not want to get them in any trouble. Viola continues complaining about Candido's ridiculous patience. George re-enters with Castruccio, Fluello, and Pioratto. George tells Candido that the constable is waiting outside the door. Frightened by the constable's presence, the gallants agree to return the beaker. They are relieved that Candido does not want to press charges against them, and ask him why he wasn't angered by their prank. Candido replies that even the loss of millions would not make him angry. The gallants praise Candido's infinite patience and exit.

Scene 6: Bellafront's room, morning
Bellafront (the titular "honest whore") is sitting in front of a mirror as she prepares her make-up. She is assisted by her servant, Roger. The gallants Castruccio, Fluello and Pioratto knock and enter (they are regular customers). Roger is sent out to purchase wine for the gallants. Matteo enters with Hippolito, who is still looking quite glum (Matteo is another of Bellafront's regular customers). Roger returns without wine. He says that he bumped into a porter on his way back and spilled every last drop. Bellafront scolds him and accuses him of pocketing the wine money for himself. Castruccio settles the fuss by giving Roger more money to go out and buy more wine. Fluello recognizes Hippolito, who has been lingering despondently in a corner up to this point. He offers to ease Hippolito's grief by setting him up with a prostitute. Hippolito is too distraught to enjoy himself. Claiming he has business to attend to, he leaves. Bellafront is intrigued by Hippolito. She asks about the cause of his despondency. Matteo and the gallants tell her that he is upset over a woman, but decline to provide any further details. They make plans to dine with Bellafront at an inn called "The Antelope" on the following Saturday. The gallants and Matteo exit. Hippolito enters moments later, looking for Matteo. Bellafront tells him he should wait for a few minutes because Matteo will be back soon (a lie). Hippolito tells her that, if she were his mistress, he would not permit her to carry on with so many different men. Bellafront sighs longingly and tells Hippolito that it is her dream to be true to a single man. Hippolito scoffs at this pronouncement and accuses Bellafront of lying to lure him into her web. He is certain that, if he were to take up with her, she would certainly deceive him, just as all prostitutes always deceive their patrons. Bellafront swears that she is an "honest whore." Claiming that there could never be such a thing, Hippolito offers to "teach" Bellafront "how to loathe" herself. He proceeds to deliver a long, nasty speech on the sordidness of prostitution. Bellafront weeps to hear his harsh words, but begs him to continue. Hippolito continues a little further and exits, even though Bellafront begs him to stay. Bellafront agonizes over her unrequited love for Hippolito. She notices that he has left his sword behind, grabs it, and prepares to stab herself, but stops when Hippolito re-enters and calls her a "madwoman." Hysterical, she begs him to love her or kill her. Hippolito takes his sword from her and exits without saying another word.

Scene 7: Candido's shop
Posing as a "swaggerer," Fustigo enters Candido's shop and claims Viola as his "coz" (which is short for "cousin," but was also a slang term for "mistress"). He proceeds to heap abuse on Candido ("the devil's dung in thy teeth"). Candido responds with characteristic calm. Fustigo kisses Viola and snatches her wedding ring. Candido remains unmoved. Fustigo demands that Candido give him some fabric for free. In an interesting metatheatrical allusion, Candido warns Fustigo that he shouldn't behave so uproariously in a place where so many people can observe his actions. George and the apprentices encourage Candido to beat Fustigo with a cudgel. Without showing the slightest hint of anger, Candido orders the apprentices to fetch the fabric Fustigo has demanded. The apprentices begrudgingly follow his orders. Candido exits to assist another customer. George and the apprentices pretend to assist Fustigo, but secretly whisper threats and insults in his ear. They scold Viola for perpetrating such a cruel trick on her husband. Viola tells Fustigo to go ahead and take the fabrics he wants. Exasperated, George and the apprentices beat Fustigo with clubs. Viola calls for help. Candido re-enters. Badly beaten, Fustigo exposes the entire ruse and admits that he is Viola's brother. Candido warns him to use the word "coz" with greater care in the future and sends him to a surgeon to have his wounds treated. An officer enters and tells Candido that he is expected to appear in the senate-house (Candido is a senator). All senators are expected to wear a long robe in the senate. Candido cannot access his robe because it is locked in a closet. Viola has the key to the closet, but she keeps it from Candido in order to vex him. Rather than getting angry at his wife, Candido instructs George to cut holes in a piece of carpet so it can be worn as a poncho. As a substitute for his hat (senators are also expected to keep their heads covered), he dons a nightcap. Warning George to refrain from laughing at his ridiculous outfit until he is gone, he heads off to the senate. Viola re-enters carrying the key to the closet. George tells her that Candido has just left, dressed like a lunatic. Viola is amazed that Candido was not vexed by her trick. She instructs George to dress in Candido's robe, hat, chain of office, etc.--a "joke" to surprise Candido when he gets home. George worries that Candido will be angered by the "joke," but Viola forces him to go along with her plan.

Scene 8: Mistress Fingerlock's brothel
Roger tells Mistress Fingerlock that Bellafront has given up prostitution. Mistress Fingerlock is shocked and annoyed to hear this news. Bellafront enters. Mistress Fingerlock tells her that a very fine, gentlemanly customer has come to her brothel—a business opportunity that Bellafront would be foolish to pass up. Bellafront heaps abuse on Roger and Fingerlock, swears she will never return to prostitution, and exits. Fingerlock and Roger fret about the money they will lose with Bellafront out of the picture.

Scene 9: Bellafront's room
Bellafront writes a song for Hippolito about her determination to quit prostitution. Matteo, Castruccio, Fluello and Pioratto enter and scold her for failing to show up for the dinner date they arranged in Scene Six. Bellafront tells them that she has given up prostitution and asks them to leave. In a speech reminiscent of Hippolito's in Scene Six, she encourages the gallants to forsake prostitutes. Speaking aside, Matteo guesses that Bellafront is only pretending to hate prostitution so she can get rid of the others and devote herself to Matteo exclusively. Offended by Bellafront's admonitions, Fluello draws his sword. Matteo rises to Bellafront's defense. Postponing any violence for the time being, they agree to fight at some point in the near future. Castruccio, Fluello and Pioratto exit. Matteo congratulates Bellafront on successfully fooling the gallants. Bellafront assures him that she is serious about quitting prostitution and asks him to leave. Matteo is shocked. Bellafront continues preaching against prostitution and Matteo eventually exits.

Scene 10: Hippolito's room
Hippolito shuts himself away in his room in order to keep his vow to stay away from women and remain true to Infelice. He orders his servant to make sure that all women are kept away from the room. The servant exits. Hippolito delivers an elegiac speech as he contemplates a portrait of Infelice. Setting the portrait aside, he turns his attention to a skull that sits on his desk. In a speech reminiscent of Hamlet, he soliloquizes on the absurdity of life and inevitability of death. The servant enters and tells Hippolito that a young man has come to speak with him. Hippolito tells him to send the visitor in. Bellafront enters disguised as a page. When she reveals herself, Hippolito calls her a devil and summons his servant. The servant is about to throw Bellafront out, but is distracted by a knock at the door. The servant exits to answer the door. Bellafront begs Hippolito to listen to her, but he rejects her pleas. The servant re-enters and tells Hippolito that Doctor Benedict has sent for him. Hippolito exits to meet with the doctor. Left alone in the room, Bellafront makes plans to leave the city (Milan) and return to her father's home.

Scene 11: Near Candido's shop
To get revenge for the beating he received at the hands of Candido's servants, Fustigo pays the bravoes Crambo and Poh to give Candido's servant George a sound beating. Crambo tells Fustigo to wait in a nearby tavern while the beating is carried out.

Scene 12: Candido's shop
George is dressed in Candido's clothes. Viola instructs the apprentices to refer to George as though he is their master. Candido enters, still dressed in the carpet and nightcap. Instead of getting angry at George and the apprentices, he plays along with the game, and pretends George is his master. Infuriated by Candido's lack of infuriation, Viola says that she has an idea for a trick that will vex Candido once and for all. She exits. Crambo and Poh enter the shop. Crambo mistakes Candido for George and strikes him with a club. Candido's head is bleeding. The apprentices enter and easily apprehend Crambo and Poh, who cry for mercy. George wants to beat them with clubs, but Candido insists on letting them go with a warning. Viola re-enters with two officers. She tells the officers that Candido has gone mad, and invites them to observe his ridiculous outfit as proof. The officers arrest Candido and take him away to the Bethlem Monastery (an insane asylum in London, not Milan—the playwrights seem to have transposed the asylum to Italy).

Scene 13: Doctor Benedict's home
The Doctor tells the Duke that he has successfully poisoned Hippolito (a lie). The Duke rewards the Doctor's supposed treachery by banishing him from court—a measure taken to ensure that the Doctor won't use his poisoning skills against the Duke himself some day. The Duke exits and Hippolito enters. The Doctor reveals the details of Infelice's faked death and the Duke's murderous plots. Hippolito says he will go to Bergamo to meet Infelice immediately. The Doctor tells him that Infelice knows all, and has already made arrangements to meet him on the following morning at Bethlem Monastery, where the couple will be married by a priest named Father Anselmo. Hippolito praises the Doctor and exits.

Scene 14: Outside the Duke's castle
Viola waits for a chance to meet with the Duke. As she converses with George, it is revealed that Candido has been imprisoned in Bethlem and Viola now regrets her role in putting him there. She hopes she will be able to convince the Duke to order Candido's release. The Duke enters. Viola explains her situation. The Duke agrees to set Candido free, but before he can sign the release warrant, Castruccio enters and announces Infelice's impending marriage at Bethlem. The Duke orders his men to disguise themselves as country gentlemen and ride to Bethlem. Everyone exits except Fluello. He curses Castruccio for betraying Hippolito and makes plans to warn the couple of the Duke's impending arrival.

Scene 15: Bethlem Monastery
Father Anselmo tells Hippolito and Infelice that he will perform their wedding ceremony at sunset. Fluello arrives and warns the couple of the Duke's imminent arrival, so Father Anselmo agrees to perform the wedding ceremony immediately. Hippolito, Infelice, Matteo and Father Anselmo exit. The Duke enters with Castruccio, Pioratto, Sinzei and others, all disguised as country gentlemen. It is still morning, and the Duke thinks that the wedding ceremony will not take place until the afternoon. Fluello suggests that they pass the intervening hours by observing the mental patients at Bethlem. Father Anselmo enters and Castruccio asks him if the Duke's company can view some of the lunatics. Father Anselmo agrees to introduce them to a few patients, but asks them to surrender their weapons first in order to avoid possible conflicts with ill-tempered patients. The Duke and his men disarm. A servant exits with their weapons. Father Anselmo introduces the "First Madman," an old man wrapped in a net who imagines he is drowning at sea. The First Madman begins by babbling witty absurdities, but eventually becomes upset and is escorted offstage by a servant. Father Anslemo next introduces the "Second Madman," a husband who went mad with jealousy over his beautiful wife, and the "Third Madman," a lover who went mad following his girlfriend's death. The Second and Third Madmen quarrel absurdly over parrots, flap-dragons, porridge, etc. The Second Madman pretends to shoot the Third Madman. The Third Madman screams in horror because he believes he is truly dead. Father Anselmo threatens to whip the madmen and orders a servant to take them away. The next patient to be introduced is Bellafront, who has come to the asylum rather than returning to her father's home. The gallants pretend that they do not recognize her. Bellafront calls the gallants "asses" and chides them for their debauchery. Hippolito, Matteo and Infelice enter, all disguised as friars. Bellafront insists on reading the "friars'" fortunes and ends up by revealing their true identities. The Duke orders his men to draw their weapons, but the weapons are nowhere to be found. Hippolito tells the Duke that he and Infelice are already married. At Father Anselmo's urging, the Duke agrees to welcome Hippolito as his new son-in-law. He thanks Bellafront for her role in helping to bring the matter to a happy conclusion. Bellafront identifies Matteo as the "villain" who stole her maidenhead. The Duke orders Matteo to marry Bellafront. Matteo is nonplussed at the notion of marrying a prostitute but eventually agrees to accept the union. Viola enters with George. They ask to see Candido. Father Anselmo exits for a moment and returns with Candido. In a quick interview, Candido demonstrates that he is not mad. The Duke agrees to release him.

== Part 2 ==
=== Production ===
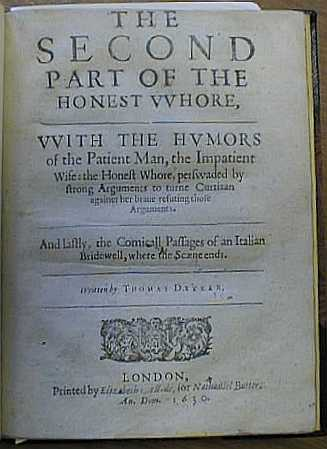
Title page of the first published edition of The Honest Whore, Part Two.

Part 2 was most likely written in 1605 or 1606, and was entered into the Stationers' Register on 29 April 1608. Part 2 was not published, however, till 1630, in a quarto printed by Elizabeth Allde for the bookseller Nathaniel Butter.

=== Summary ===
In this second part, Hippolito has conceived a violent lust for Bellafront, whose husband has (perhaps not surprisingly) returned to the life of a wastrel. Yet, despite her dire need, Bellafront refuses to surrender her new virtue. All ends well through the parallel machinations of Hippolito's wife and Bellafront's father.

=== Later use ===
William Dunlap substantially borrowed from this play when writing The Italian Father, which was first performed in New York in 1799. Though Dunlap did not initially attribute Dekker, he later admitted that Dekker "furnished many of the finest passages in this drama."

The 1830 play The Deformed by Richard Penn Smith is based both on The Honest Whore and Dunlap's adaptation.
