= Caleb Bingham =

American educator and textbook author

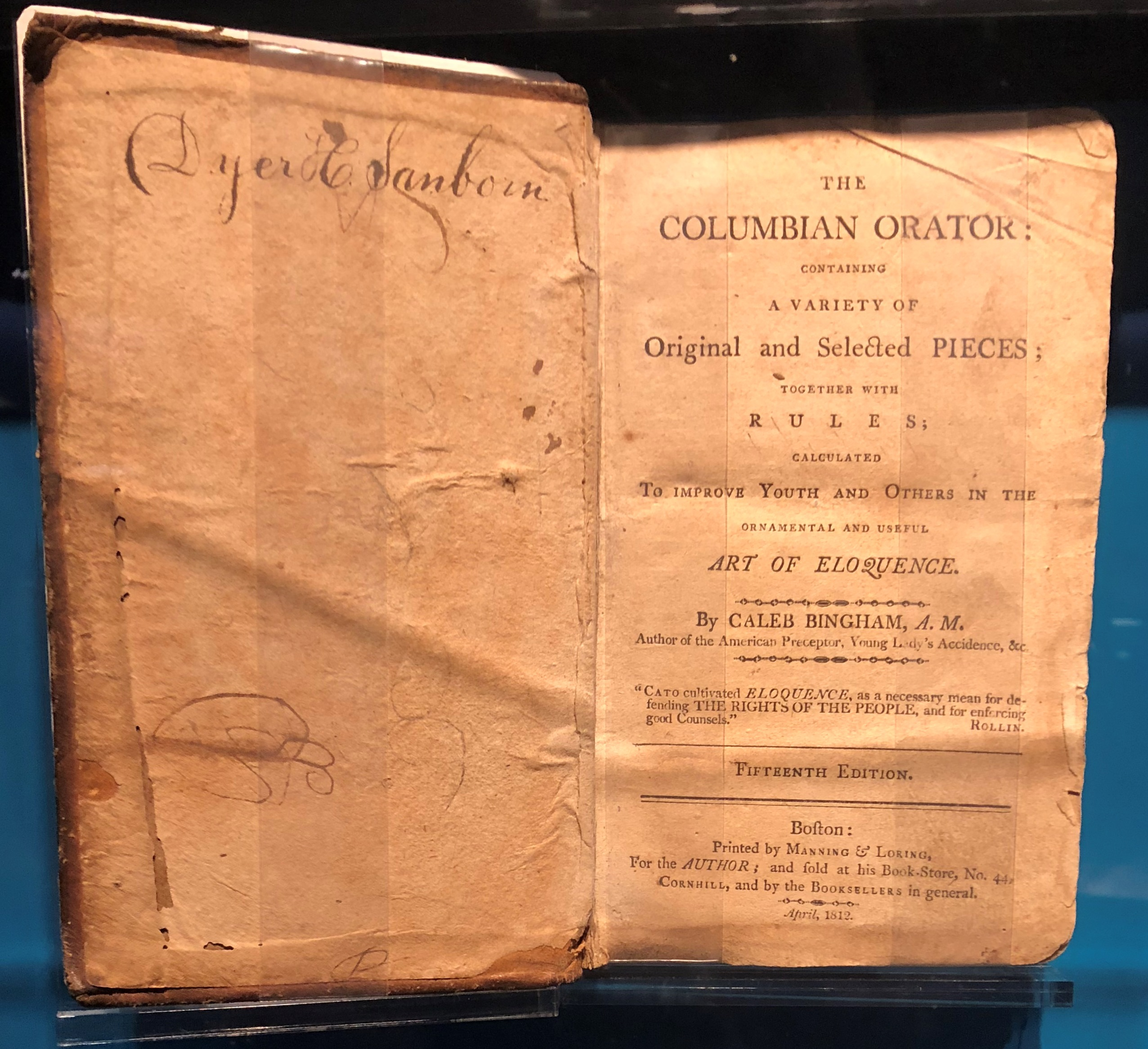
A copy of The Columbian Orator by Caleb Bingham, edition 1812.

Caleb Bingham (1757–1817) was an educator and textbook author of late 18th-century New England, whose works were also influential into the 19th and 20th. Among his most influential works were books on oratory, or public speaking. A native of Salisbury, Connecticut, he spent much of his career in Boston, Massachusetts as a publisher and bookseller. Bingham was educated at Dartmouth College and valedictorian of his class of 1782. He also taught at the college.

One of his most popular works was The Columbian Orator, originally published in 1797, an anthology which contained rules on oratory, but consisted primarily of texts for reading and recitation. The selections (from about three dozen writers) include poems, essays, short dialogues, and extracts from famous speeches. The content reflects a substantial concern with the moral education of youth and the preparation of citizens in the young Republic. (Selections include arguments made in Parliament in support of the American Colonies.) The book has continued in print into the late 20th century.

The Columbian Orator served as an inspiration to many orators, including the African-American abolitionist Frederick Douglass, who purchased a copy as a young man and used it to develop his powerful public speaking style.

Two other well-known textbooks of Bingham's, also on reading, grammar, and oratory, were The American Preceptor (1794) and The Young Lady's Accidence (1785). The American Preceptor is similar to The Columbian Orator in its content. Selections (often about two pages in length) draw attention to the evils of slavery, the importance of clemency toward the unfortunate (including one's captive enemies), personal virtue and industry, religious tolerance, and the education of girls. Some stories recite the acts of a virtuous American Indian, African, Moor, Catholic, or other person—sometimes in contrast to a less virtuous white or Christian character. Bingham also takes aim at characters who care more about fashion, entertainments, or lapdogs than about honest labor, solid education, and duties within the household. The publication of The Young Lady's Accidence was part of his advocacy for opening education to girls. The success of Bingham's books can be attributed in part to the dramatic and narrative interest of many selections.

Additional biographical and historical material appears in David W. Blight (ed. and new intro.), Caleb Bingham, The Columbian Orator: Containing a Variety of Original and Selected Pieces together with Rules, Which are Calculated to Improve Youth and Others, in the Ornamental and Useful Art of Eloquence (Bicentennial Edition, New York: New York University Press, 1998). For a biographical essay by someone who knew Bingham, see William S. Fowle, “Memoir of Caleb Bingham, with Notices of the Public Schools of Boston, prior to 1800.” Fowle's essay is also rich in detail concerning educational materials and practices during Bingham's lifetime.
