= Charles Coffin Jewett =

American librarian (1816–1868)

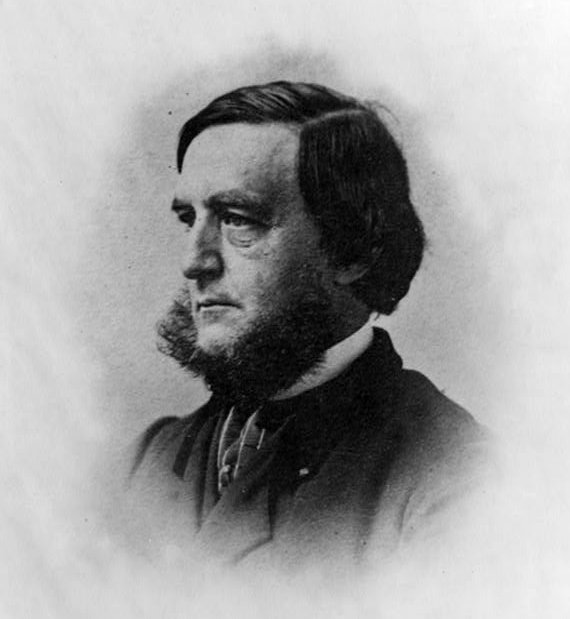
- Born: August 12, 1816
- Died: January 9, 1868 (aged 51)
- Citizenship: USA
- Education: Brown University
- Occupation: Librarian
- Employer(s): Smithsonian Institution, Boston Public Library
- Relatives: John P. Jewett

Charles Coffin Jewett (August 12, 1816 – January 9, 1868) was an American librarian, in 1848 becoming the Librarian and Assistant Secretary of the Smithsonian Institution before being appointed superintendent of the Boston Public Library in 1858. He was born in Lebanon, Maine.

== Early life ==
Charles Coffin Jewett graduated from Salem Latin School in 1831. He enrolled at Dartmouth College in Rhode Island, but then shortly thereafter he transferred to Brown University where he studied a classical course load of Greek, Latin, logic mathematics, and moral philosophy; however, Jewett showed the greatest interest in languages.

Jewett had a love for books but he was lacking personal fortune so this made him an avid library user. Unfortunately for him, Jewett found the library at Brown rather lacking with its collection of only 6000 volumes. A popular thing at the time was for special societies on campus to curate their own libraries that held books on that societies special interests. In fact, the first library experience Jewett gained was at the Hope College in the library that was curated by the Miskosmian Society. Along with classmate William Lawton Brown, Jewett cataloged the collection of this library beginning what would be a long career of library cataloging.

== Career ==
His first cataloging experience took place as a Brown student while helping to catalog the library of the Philermenian Literary Society. In 1837, he entered Andover Theological Seminary, where he helped catalog the Andover Theological Seminary Library. In 1841, he became the librarian of Brown University. He extensively rearranged that library, and created a catalog in two parts; an alphabetical descriptive catalog of the items in the library, and an alphabetical Index of Subjects. After its completion in 1843, he embarked on a two-year campaign of book purchasing and study in Europe.

He became Librarian and Assistant Secretary of the Smithsonian Institution in 1848, and began the task of building the Smithsonian's library by soliciting catalogs from prominent libraries and publishing a survey of U.S. libraries. He also started mechanical duplication of individual catalog entries for the re-publication of book catalogs using the technique of stereotyping. He was elected a member of the American Antiquarian Society in 1851.

Jewett was unanimously elected president at the first Librarian's Convention in 1853. Jewett left the Smithsonian after being relieved of his position due to conflicts with his supervisor and the Board of Regents over how the Institution's funds were being allocated. He went on to become Superintendent of the Boston Public Library in 1858, where he remained until his death.

=== National library ===
Jewett had a vision for a national library, which would hold a union catalog of all the public libraries in the United States. This catalog would give scholars access to important books, point out differences in intellectual fields, and generally act as an aid to the evolution of knowledge while making the Smithsonian Institution the pre-eminent center for research. He spent the greater part of his life developing guidelines toward this end.

=== Views on cataloging ===
Jewett was a strong advocate for alphabetical catalogs, both because of their convenience to catalogers and their user-friendliness. He believed that catalogs should be more than lists of titles, and should contain bibliographical and biographical information. Individual printed cards kept the costs of printing the catalog down. His idea of the union catalog included the use of “stereotyped plates,” which was a set of mass-produced titles that were created according to a set of strict rules. Jewett was hugely concerned with uniformity, and believed stringent rules the only way to avoid confusion, no matter how difficult it made things for users.

== Death ==
Charles Jewett died after suffering an attack of apoplexy while working at his desk in the Boston Public Library.

Jewett's brother was Boston book publisher John P. Jewett.

== Sources ==
- Charles C. Jewett. Notices of public libraries in the United States of America. Printed by order of Congress, as an appendix to the Fourth annual report of the Board of Regents of the Smithsonian Institution. Washington, Printed for the House of Representatives, 1851.
- Historical Development of Ideas Concerning Library Catalogues: Their Purpose and Organization, by Moya K. Mason
- Charles Coffin Jewett, by the Columbia Electronic Encyclopedia, 6th ed.
- Harris,M(editor).(1975).The Age of Jewett: Charles Coffin Jewett and American Librarianship, 1841-1868. Littleton, Colo: Libraries Unlimited, Inc.
- Mitchell, Martha. “Jewett, Charles C.” Encyclopedia Brunoniana. Ed. Brown University. 1993. Print. 17 Apr. 2016.
