= Anna Bartlett Warner =

American hymnwriter

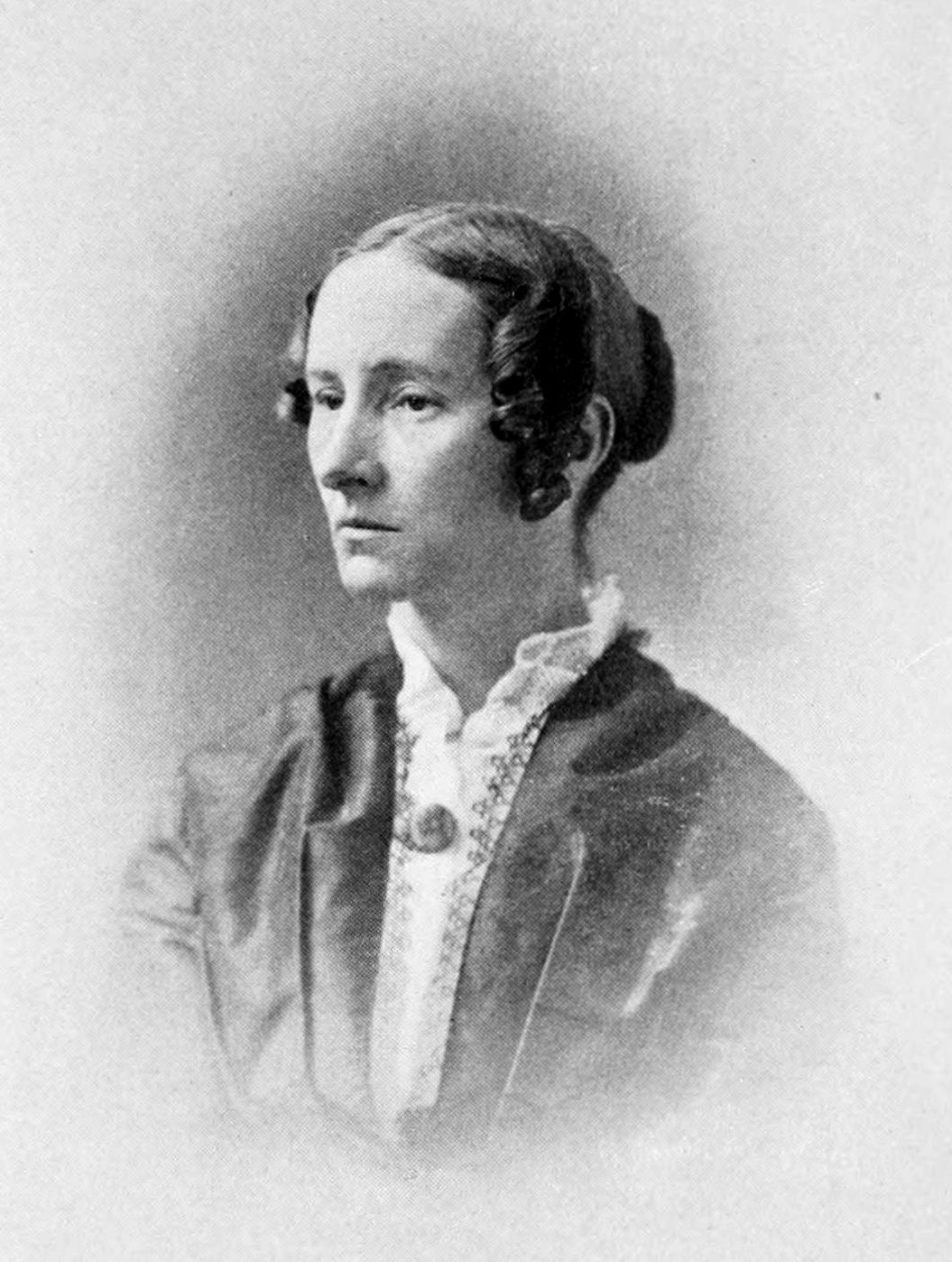
- Born: August 31, 1824; Long Island, New York
- Died: January 22, 1915 (aged 90); Highland Falls, New York
- Resting place: West Point Cemetery
- Occupation: Author
- Writing career
- Pen name: Amy Lothrop

Anna Bartlett Warner (August 31, 1824 – January 22, 1915) was an American writer, the author of several books, and of poems set to music as hymns and religious songs for children. She is best known for writing the hymn "Jesus Loves Me".

== Biography ==
Anna Bartlett Warner was born on Long Island on August 31, 1824. She and her sister became devout Christians in the late 1830s. After their conversion, they became confirmed members of the Mercer Street Presbyterian church, although in the 1860s, Anna became drawn into Methodist circles.

She died at her home in Highland Falls, New York on January 22, 1915.

== Work ==
The best known of her hymns is almost certainly "Jesus Loves Me". Some stanzas of this appear in modern hymnals rewritten by David Rutherford McGuire.

She wrote some books jointly with her sister Susan Warner (Elizabeth Wetherell) which included Wych Hazel (1853), Mr. Rutherford's Children (1855) and The Hills of the Shatemuc (1856). She sometimes wrote under the pseudonym Amy Lothrop. She wrote thirty-one novels on her own, the most popular of which was Dollars and Cents (1852), Others were Gold of Chickaree, In West Point Colors (1904), Stories of Blackberry Hollow and Stories of Vinegar Hill (1872). She also wrote a biography of her sister Susan.

== Legacy ==
Her former family home is now a museum on the grounds of The United States Military Academy which was opposite the house during her lifetime and where her uncle had been chaplain from 1828 to 1838. The Constitution Island Association have worked hard to maintain the house and restore the gardens so that they are similar to their appearance in Anna Warner's lifetime, following her month-by-month descriptions of life on Constitution Island, as written in Gardening by Myself.
