= Haymarket Theatre (Boston) =

Coordinates: 42°21′9.87″N 71°3′51.68″W

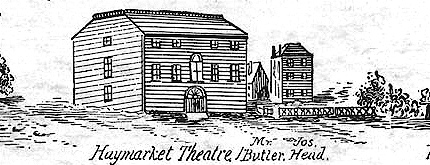
Haymarket Theatre, Boston, ca.1800

The Haymarket Theatre (1796–1803) or Hay-Market Theatre was a theatre in late-18th century Boston, Massachusetts. Organized by Charles Stuart Powell, it occupied a large, wooden building "opposite the Mall on Common (later Tremont) Street, near Hatch's Tavern." In addition to dramatic plays, the theatre presented some 62 musical entertainments during its first 5 years. The Haymarket "was seldom used after 1800, and on March 3, 1803, it was offered for sale at auction on the condition that it be removed in 60 days."

== Works performed ==
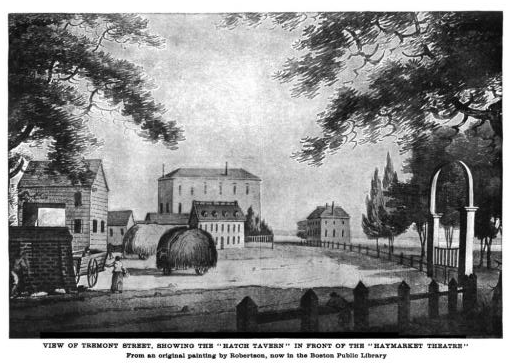
View of Tremont St. in Boston, showing Haymarket Theatre, ca.1796

- Isaac Bickerstaffe's "The Padlock"
- Samuel Birch's "The Adopted Child"
- William Hill Brown's "West Point Preserved"
- John Daly Burk's "Bunker-Hill; or, the Death of General Warren"
- Susanna Centlivre's "The Ghost"
- James Cobb's "The Siege of Belgrade"
- George Colman's "Inkle and Yarico"
- Richard Cumberland's "Note of Hand"
- Charles Dibdin's "The Quaker"; "The Waterman"
- David Everett's "Daranzel; or, the Persian Patriot"
- George Farquhar's "The Recruiting Officer"
- Henry Fielding's "The Mock Doctor"
- David Garrick's "The Lying Valet"
- Oliver Goldsmith's "She Stoops to Conquer"
- John Hodgkinson's "The Launch, or, Huzza for the Constitution"
- Elizabeth Inchbald's "Married Man"; "Animal Magnetism;" "Child of Nature"
- Robert Jephson's "Two Strings to Your Bow"
- Hugh Kelly's "Romance of an Hour"
- Kotzebue's "The stranger; or, Misanthropy and repentance"
- Nathaniel Lee's "Alexander the Great"
- Thomas Morton's "Way to Get Married"
- Arthur Murphy's "Old Maid"
- John O'Keeffe's "The Young Quaker"; "Agreeable Surprise;" "Son in Law"
- Walley Chamberlain Oulton's "All in Good Humour"
- William Preston's "Death of Louis XVI"
- Frederick Reynolds' "Cheap Living"
- Richard Brinsley Sheridan's "The School for Scandal"
- Royall Tyler's "A Georgia Spec; or, Land in the Moon"
- "The Boston Balloon; or, a Supposed Flight from the Beacon-Hill" ("localized from the celebrated farce written by Mrs. Inchbald, of Mogul Tale")
- "The Village Lawyer"
- "Washington, or Memorable Era of 1776"

== Performers ==
- Mrs. Allen
- Mr. Amean
- Mr. Barrett
- Mrs. Barrett
- Mr. Borier
- Mr. Bowen
- Mrs. Brett
- Miss Broadhurst
- Mr. Clough
- Mr. Cunnington
- Mr. Dickenson
- Mr. Dubois
- Mr. Fawcett
- Mons. Francisqui (or Francisquy)
- Mrs. Harper
- Miss Harrison
- Mr. Hodgkinson
- Mrs. Hodgkinson
- Mr. Hughes
- Mrs. Hughes
- Miss Gowen
- Mr. Kenny
- Mrs. King
- Mr. Lege
- Madame Lege
- Mr. Marriott
- Mrs. Pick
- Mr. S. Powell
- Mrs. S. Powell
- Mr. Sevens
- Master Shaffer
- Mr. Simpson
- Mrs. Simpson
- Mr. Smith
- Mr. Spinacuta
- Mr. Sprague
- Mr. Taylor
- Mr. Turnbull
- Mr. Val
- Madame Val
- Mr. Villiers
- Eleanor Westray (later Mrs. Darley)
- Elizabeth Westray (later Mrs. Villiers and Mrs. Twaits)
- David Williamson
- Mr. Wilson
