= John Daly Burk =

Irish-American journalist

John Daly Burk (c.1776 – 1808) was an Irish-born dramatist, historian, and newspaperman in the United States in the late 18th and early 19th centuries. He died fighting a duel in Virginia in 1808.

== Biography ==
Burk was probably born in Cork, Ireland circa 1772 and was raised Protestant. Burk attended Trinity College, Dublin. After attempting to help rescue a rebel led for execution outside Trinity College Dublin, he was pursued by the police and made his escape through a bookstore. Supplied with the garments of Ms. Daly, one of the residents of the bookstore, he adopted the name in gratitude and boarded a ship bound for America. In Boston, Massachusetts, he edited the Polar Star newspaper, ca.1796. In New York, he published The Time-Piece. In 1798, he settled in Virginia.

Burk's play Bunker-Hill premiered at the Haymarket Theatre, Boston, in 1797. "At that time it was well received, the British being well peppered, and the 'stars and stripes' floating triumphant. It was local in character, and the scene laid in Charlestown and Boston." According to J.T. Buckingham, "the tragedy had not a particle of merit, except its brevity. It was written in blank verse, if a composition having no attribute of poetry could be so called. It was as destitute of plot and distinctness of character as it was of all claim to poetry." When U.S. President John Adams saw the play in New York and was asked his opinion afterward by actor Giles Leonard Barrett, who had portrayed General Warren, Adams replied "My friend, General Warren was a scholar and a gentleman, but your author has made him a bully and a blackguard."
