= The Columbian Orator =

18th-century rhetoric textbook

The Columbian Orator: Containing a Variety of Original and Selected Pieces; together with Rules; Calculated to Improve Youth and Others in the Ornamental and Useful Art of Eloquence
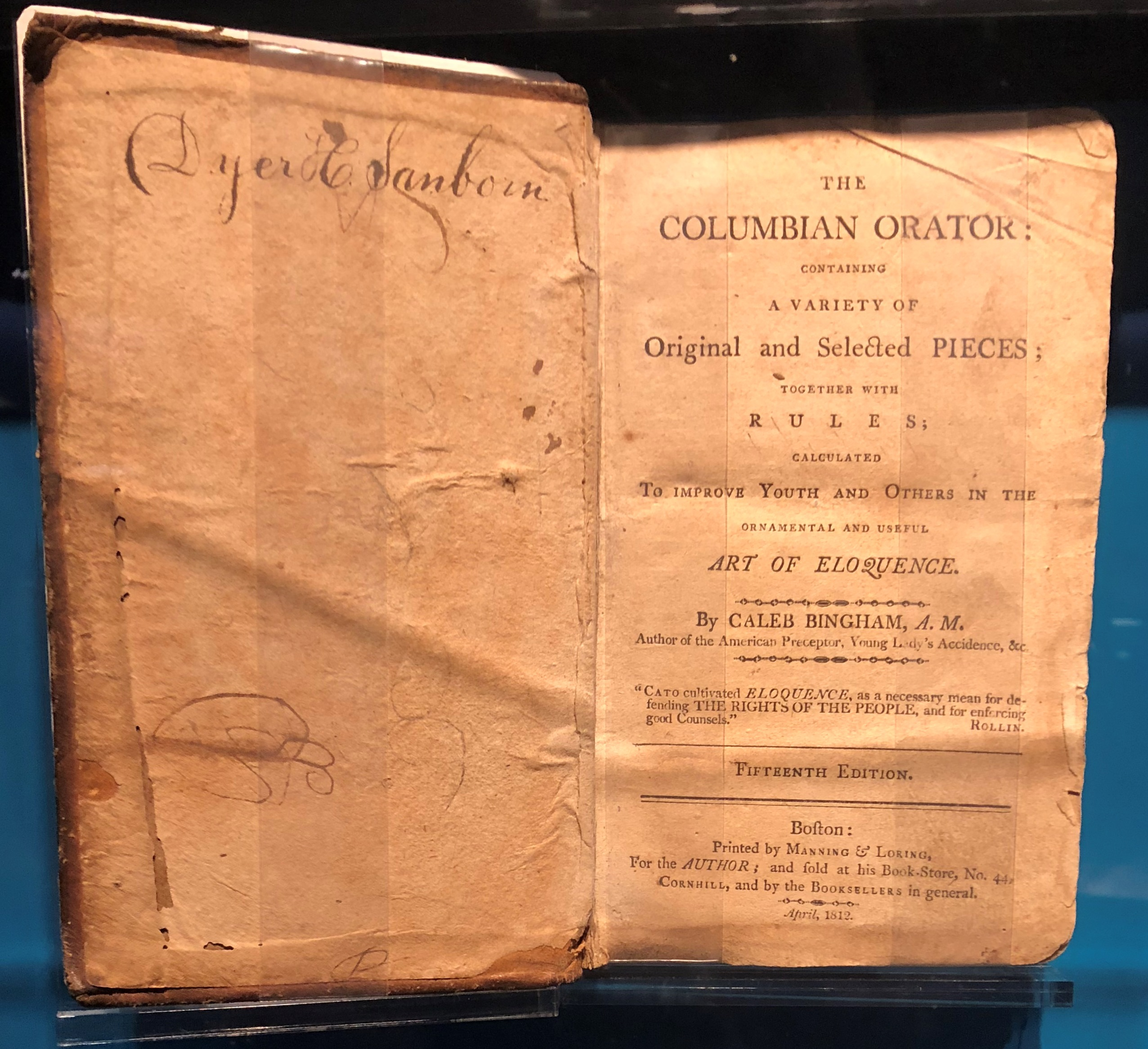
- A copy of the 15th edition (1812) of The Columbian Orator at the National Civil Rights Museum in Memphis, Tennessee.
- Author: Caleb Bingham and others
- Language: English
- Publisher: Printed by Manning & Loring, for the author, No. 44, for David West, No. 56, and for John West, No. 75, Cornhill
- Publication date: May 1797
- Publication place: Boston, Massachusetts, United States
- Media type: Hardcover
- Pages: 288
- OCLC: 3636467

The Columbian Orator is a collection of political essays, poems, and dialogues collected and written by Caleb Bingham. First published in May 1797, it includes speeches by Benjamin Franklin and George Washington, some imagined speeches by historical figures such as Cato the Younger and Socrates, and writings by Hugh Blair, Paulus Emilius, David Everett, James Hervey, Jonathan Mason, Thomas Muir, Joseph Perkins, Philo and others. It was popularly used for recitation in American schoolrooms from 1790 to 1820 to teach pupils reading and speaking. Typical of many readers of that period, the anthology celebrated "republican virtues," promoting patriotism and questioning the ethics of slavery. The Columbian Orator is an example of progymnasmata, containing examples for students to copy and imitate.

It is significant for inspiring a generation of American abolitionists, including orator Frederick Douglass (when he still an enslaved youth), essayist Ralph Waldo Emerson, and author Harriet Beecher Stowe, best known for her novel Uncle Tom's Cabin.

In his Narrative of the Life of Frederick Douglass (chap. 7), self-taught writer and abolitionist Douglass praises the book as his first introduction to human history and eloquence. When he was 12 years old and still enslaved, he bought a copy using 50 cents which he had saved from shining shoes, and he "read [the essays] over and over again with unabated interest ... What [he] got from Sheridan was a bold denunciation of slavery, and a powerful vindication of human rights."

Douglass was particularly inspired by a dialogue between an enslaved person and his master in The Columbian Orator that demonstrated the intelligence of the slave. In this passage, the master presented the slave with justifications of slavery, each of which the slave rebutted, until the master was convinced that the bondage was in fact unethical. The passage ended with the slave winning the argument and, therefore, his freedom. It can be assumed that the book's guidelines of oratory also contributed to Douglass's success as a public speaker; William Lloyd Garrison praised Douglass in the introduction of his autobiography, claiming, "Patrick Henry, of revolutionary fame, never made a speech more eloquent in the cause of liberty."

The Columbian Orator became symbolic not only of human rights but also of the power of eloquence and articulation.

A bicentennial edition edited by David W. Blight was published in 1998.

== Quotes ==
"I well remember, when I was a boy, how ardently I longed for the opportunity of reading, but had no access to a library", Caleb Bingham, 1803.

"Every opportunity I got, I used to read this book", Frederick Douglass, 1845.
