= Richard Penn Smith =

American dramatist (1799-1854)

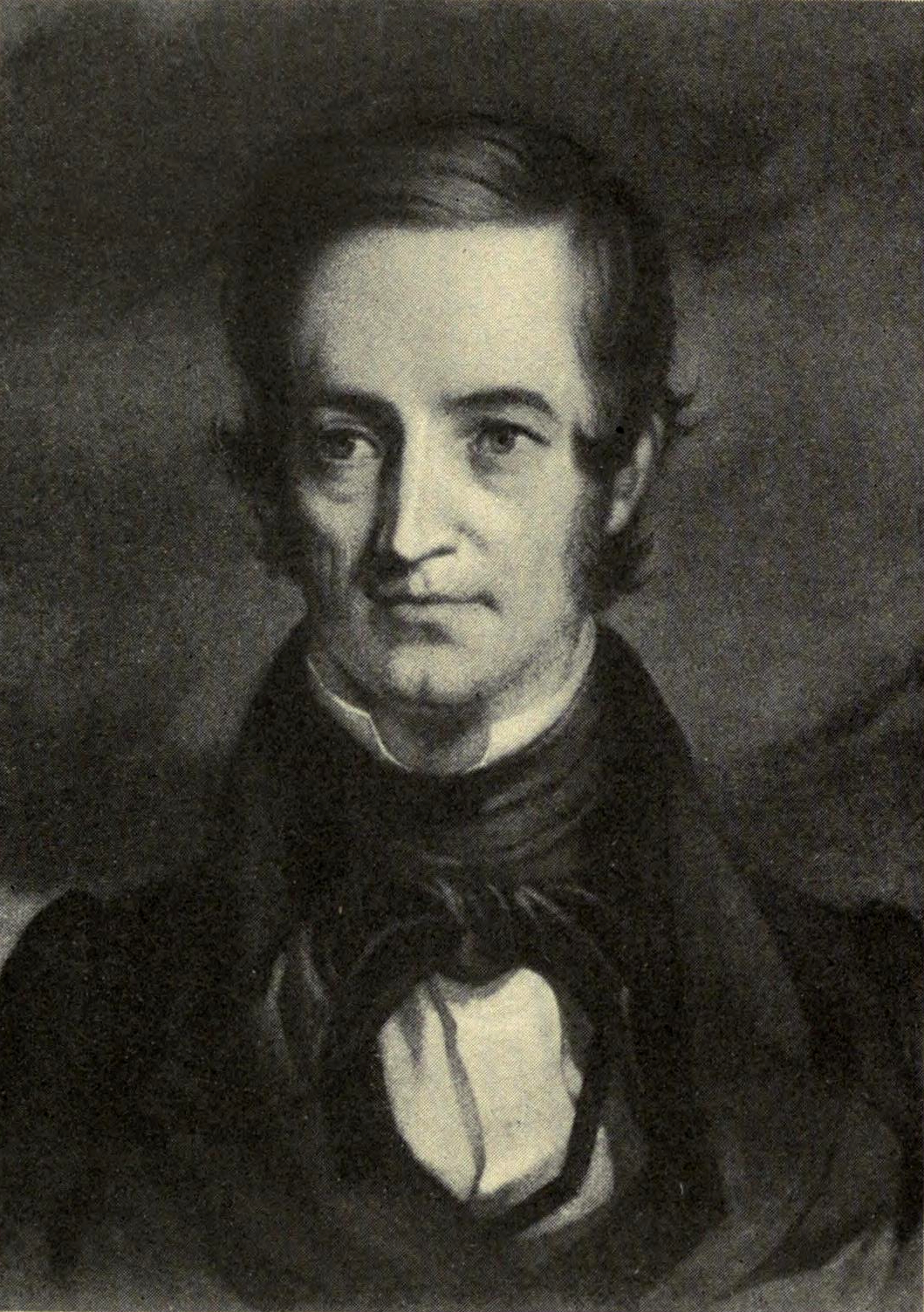
- Born: March 13, 1799; Philadelphia, Pennsylvania, U.S.
- Died: August 12, 1854 (aged 55); Philadelphia, Pennsylvania, U.S.
- Resting place: Laurel Hill Cemetery, Philadelphia, Pennsylvania, U.S.
- Occupation: playwright

Richard Penn Smith (March 13, 1799 – August 12, 1854) was an American playwright who wrote twenty plays, of which fifteen were performed. He wrote a largely fictitious account of events leading up to and at the Battle of the Alamo, which was presented as the diary of Davy Crockett.

== Early life and education ==
Smith was born on March 13, 1799, in Philadelphia to Ann Rudolph and William Moore Smith. His grandfather was William Smith, the first provost of the College of Philadelphia. He was educated in local schools and by private tutors. In 1818 he studied law in the law offices of William Rawle and joined the Philadelphia bar in 1820.

== Career ==
He wrote a series of columns named "The Plagiary" for a local newspaper. He purchased The Aurora in 1822 and worked as editor until 1827. The next year his first play, Quite Correct, was produced at the Chestnut Street Theater. That same year, he sold The Aurora and returned to legal practice to support his theatrical work. He wrote twenty plays and fifteen were performed.

In 1836, Smith published "Col. Crockett's Exploits and Adventures in Texas: wherein is contained a full account of his journey from Tennessee to the Red River and Natchitoches, and thence across Texas to San Antonio; including many hair-breadth escapes; together with a topographical, historical, and political view of Texas ...". The author and publishers claimed it was based on Crockett’s journal, but doubt was raised due to Crockett's poor writing ability. Multiple sources claimed that Smith was the actual author of the book including Edgar Allan Poe and Edgar Carey, the publisher. The book fed into the legend of Davy Crockett.

He died on August 12, 1854. He was initially interred in a mausoleum on his estate but was reinterred along with 14 family members to a plot at Laurel Hill Cemetery.

== Personal life ==
He married Elinor Matilda Lincoln on May 5, 1823. Together they had five children, but only one lived to adult age. Elinor died in 1833 and Smith remarried in 1836 to Isabella Stratton Knisell. Five children were born of his second marriage.

== Publications ==
Plays

- Quite Correct (1828)
- The Eighth of January (1829)
- The Disowned: or The Prodigals (1830)
- A Wife at a Venture (1829)
- The Sentinels: or The Two Sergeants (1829)
- William Penn (1829)
- The Triumph at Plattsburgh (1830)
- The Deformed: or Woman's Trial (1830) (based on The Honest Whore, Part II (c. 1606) and The Italian Father (1799))
- The Water-Witch (1830)
- Caius Marius (1831)
- Is She a Brigand? (1833)
- The Daughter (1836)
- The Actress of Padua (1836)
- The Bombardment of Algiers (?)
- The Last Man: or The Cock of the Village (?)

Books

- Col. Crockett's Exploits and Adventures in Texas: wherein is contained a full account of his journey from Tennessee to the Red River and Natchitoches, and thence across Texas to San Antonio; including many hair-breadth escapes; together with a topographical, historical, and political view of Texas, New York: Nafis & Cornish, Philadelphia: John B. Perry, 1845
