= Giles Leonard Barrett =

English actor

Giles Linnett Barrett (b. c. 1744 - d. 18 November 1809) was an English actor who came to the United States in the 1790s, and was most popular in Boston.

== England ==
In England, Barrett was the manager of the Norwich Theatre in the 1780s and was married to the daughter of a Norwich alderman. He later left his wife and travelled to America with a second wife. He was also, at some point, the manager of what may have been the Theatre Royal, Exeter.

== America ==
Barrett had his American debut in Boston on 28 December 1796, playing the role of Ranger in The Suspicious Husband (a 1747 play by Benjamin Hoadly). He first appeared in New York at the John Street Theatre in August 1797, playing the role of Don Felix in The Wonder (a 1714 play by Susanna Centlivre). He managed the Federal Street Theatre in Boston circa 1798 until it was destroyed by a fire in February 1798. He briefly returned to managing the theater in 1799 after it was rebuilt, but the season was not a success.

In late 1798, Barrett wrote to U.S. President John Adams for assistance. Barrett notes therein that Adams had seen him perform the role of General Warren in Bunker-Hill, a 1797 play by John Daly Burk, and was "induced to hope, my humble exertions may still Live in Your Memory." When Adams had seen the play in New York and been asked his opinion afterward by Barrett, Adams replied "My friend, General Warren was a scholar and a gentleman, but your author has made him a bully and a blackguard." This was likely a political reaction to the play, not Barrett's performance. Barrett also reports in his letter to Adams that he had been forced to " support my family by the exertion of my talents in the Science of defence"; Barrett was an accomplished fencer.

Barrett died in Boston on 18 November 1809 at age 65. His second wife ("Mrs. Barrett") was also an actor and died in Boston in 1832. Their son George Barrett was also an actor.
