= The Lamplighter =

1854 novel by Maria Susanna Cummins

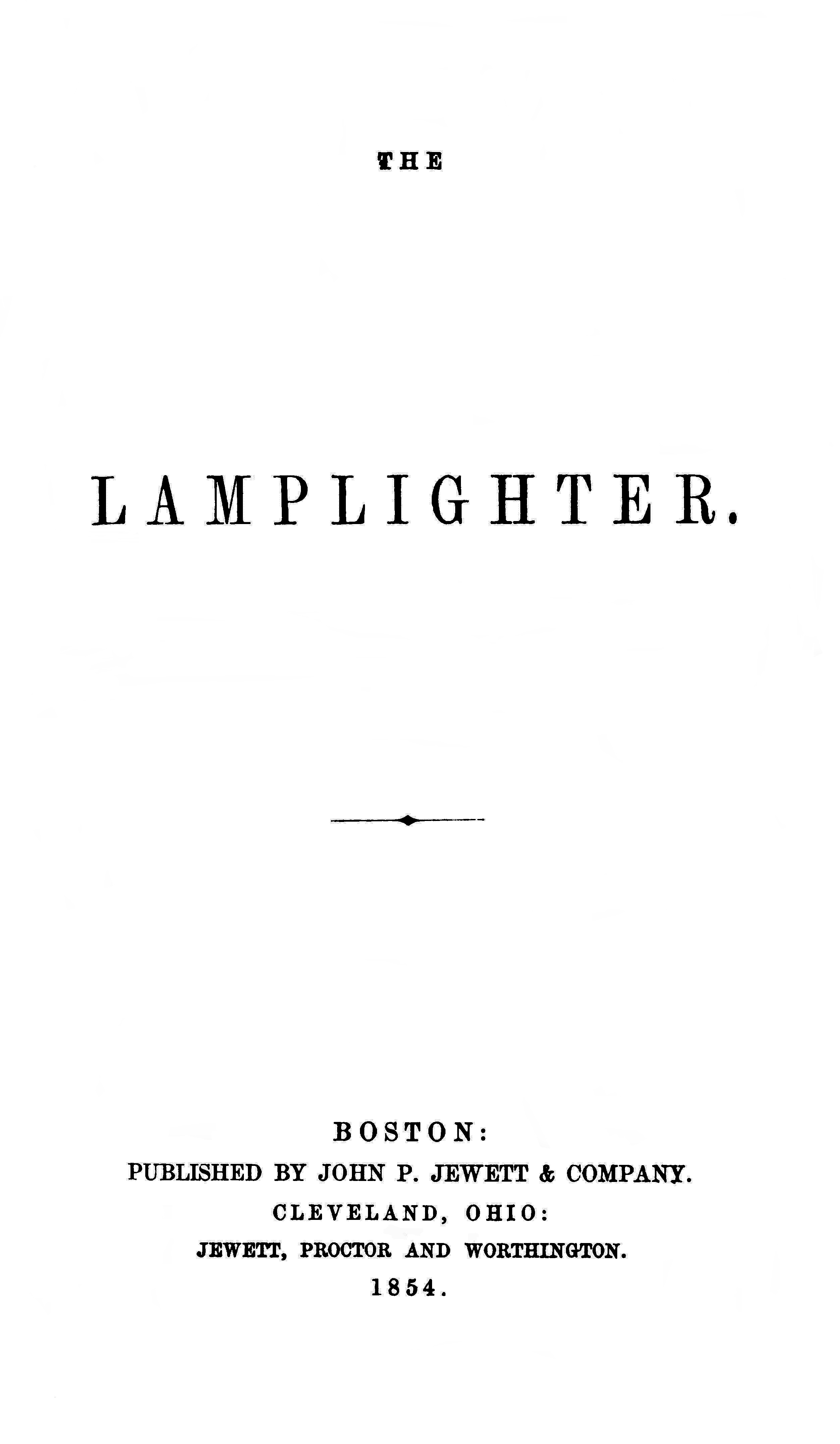
- First edition title page
- Author: Maria Susanna Cummins
- Language: English
- Genre: Novel
- Publisher: John P. Jewett and Company (United States)
- Publication date: March 1, 1854
- Publication place: United States
- Media type: Print (Hardcover)

The Lamplighter is a novel written by Maria Susanna Cummins and published in 1854, and a best-selling novel of its era.

== Plot synopsis ==
A female Bildungsroman, The Lamplighter tells the story of Gertrude Flint, an abandoned and mistreated orphan rescued at the age of eight by Trueman Flint, a lamplighter, from her abusive guardian, Nan Grant. Gertrude is lovingly raised and taught virtues and religious faith. She becomes a moralistic woman. In adulthood, she is rewarded for her long suffering with marriage to a childhood friend.

== Response ==
The Lamplighter was Cummins's first novel and was an immediate best-seller, selling 20,000 copies in twenty days. The work sold 40,000 in eight weeks, and within five months it had sold 65,000. At the time it was second in sales only to Harriet Beecher Stowe's Uncle Tom's Cabin. It sold over 100,000 copies in Britain and was translated into multiple different languages.

Nathaniel Hawthorne wrote of the novel in an 1855 letter to William Ticknor: "What is the mystery of these innumerable editions of the Lamplighter, and other books neither better nor worse?" In this same letter Hawthorne made his notorious remark, "America is now wholly given over to a d—d mob of scribbling women." (He had censored the word "damned.") His letter today is posited as the primary "claim to fame" of the novel.

In 1950, James D. Hart (author of The Oxford Companion to American Literature) noted that The Lamplighter could provide insight into the American culture of its time:

If a student of taste wants to know the thoughts and feelings of the majority who lived during Franklin Pierce's administration [1853–57], he will find more positive value in Maria Cummins' The Lamplighter or T.S. Arthur's Ten Nights in a Bar-Room than he will in Thoreau's Walden [the first two being far more popular] – all books published in 1854.... Usually the book that is popular pleases the reader because it is shaped by the same forces that mold his non-reading hours, so that its dispositions and convictions, its language and subject, re-create the sense of the present, to die away as soon as that present becomes the past.

The character of Gerty MacDowell in James Joyce's Ulysses is based on the heroine of the novel, Gerty Flint, in a portion of Ulysses generally believed to be a parody of Cummins' writing style. The connection of Gerty with The Lamplighter has been recognised as long back as Stanley Sultan's book The Argument of Ulysses published in 1964.

The Lamplighter was widely read for close to a century; for example, in 1915, the New York Public Library ordered 250 copies of a new edition.

== Adaptations ==
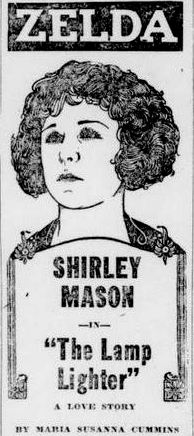
Ad for 1921 film

The novel's success saw it quickly adapted for the stage. It was presented in numerous productions in the United States and England in the 1850s. It was also made into a silent film in 1921 with Shirley Mason playing the role of Gertie.
