= The Wide, Wide World =

1850 novel by Susan Warner

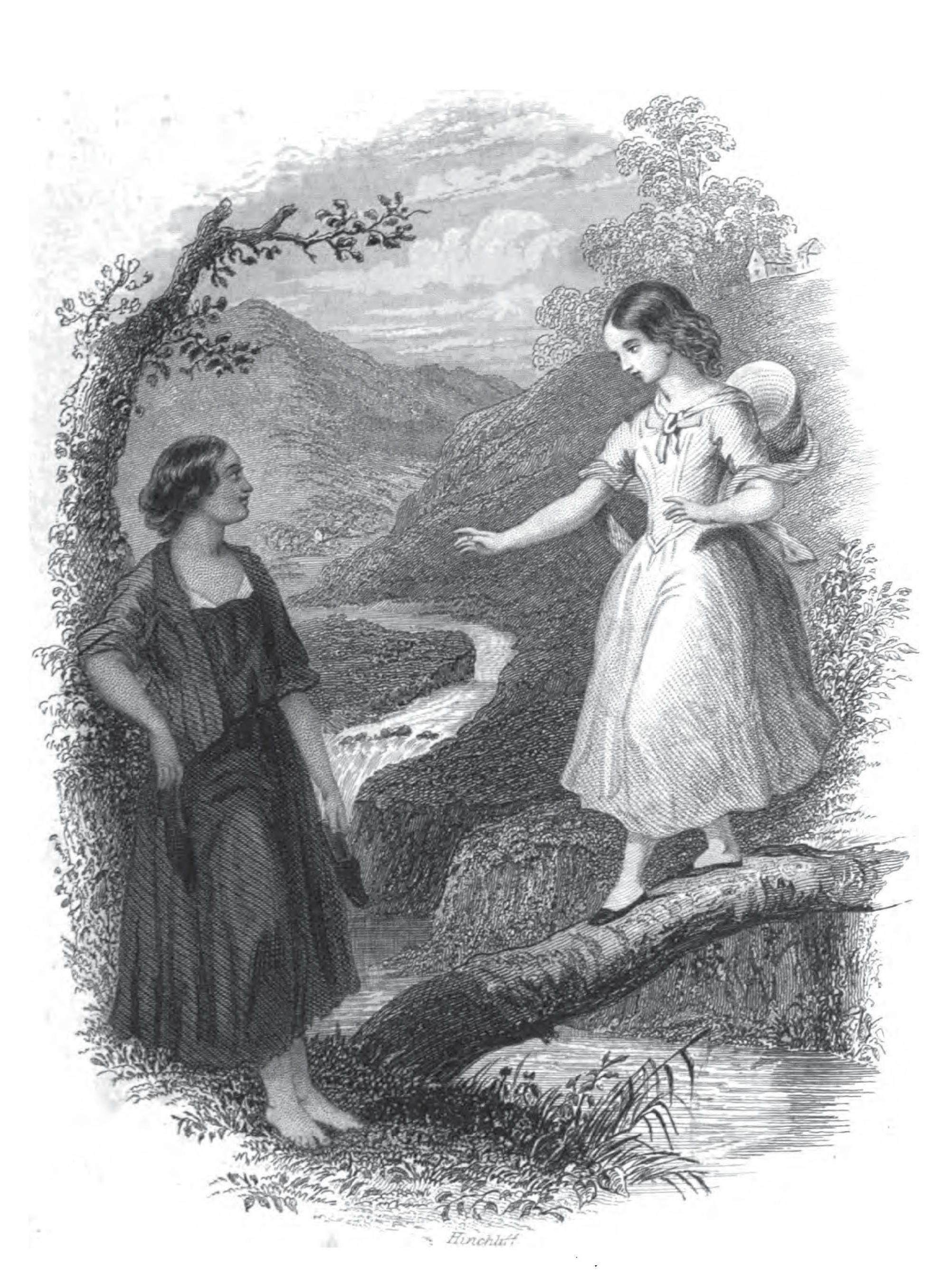
- Frontispiece from an 1853 edition
- Author: Susan Warner
- Language: English
- Genre: Novel
- Publication date: 1850
- Publication place: United States
- Media type: Print

The Wide, Wide World is an 1850 novel by Susan Warner, published under the pseudonym Elizabeth Wetherell. It is often acclaimed as America's first bestseller.

== Plot ==
The Wide, Wide World is a work of sentimentalism about the life of young Ellen Montgomery. The story begins with Ellen's happy life being disrupted by the fact that her mother is very ill and her father must take her to Europe, requiring Ellen to leave home to live with an almost-unknown aunt. Though Ellen tries to act strong for her mother's sake, she is devastated and can find solace in nothing.

Eventually the day comes when Ellen must say goodbye to her mother and travel in the company of strangers to her aunt's home. Unfortunately these strangers are unkind to Ellen and she tries to leave the boat on which they are traveling. An old man sees Ellen crying and tells her to trust in God. He teaches her about being a Christian, as her mother had done, and asks her if she is ready to give her heart to Jesus. After talking with the man, Ellen becomes determined to become a true Christian, which gives her strength for the rest of the journey to her aunt's place in Thirwall.

On Ellen's first night in Thirwall, she learns that her father forgot to inform her aunt that she was coming, so a "Mr. Van Brunt" escorts her to her aunt's home. This aunt, Fortune Emerson, proves to be quite different from Ellen's loving mother: she treats Ellen unkindly and refuses to let her attend school. Ellen hates living with Fortune and comes to find comfort in the society of Mr. Van Brunt and other neighbors as she becomes more familiar with her new surroundings.

One day, discovering that her aunt withheld a letter from Mrs. Montgomery, Ellen runs crying into the woods. There she meets Alice Humphreys, the daughter of a local minister. Alice is kind to Ellen and invites her to tea the next day, to give Ellen a chance to tell her troubles; maybe Alice would be able to help. The girls become fast friends and Alice adopts Ellen as a sister, offering to educate her and guide her spiritually, teaching her to forgive others and trust in the Lord.

Alice and her brother John, who is away at school much of the time, treat Ellen like family, even inviting her to spend Christmas in the nearby town of Ventnor with them and their friends, the Marshmans. While there, Ellen meets another Ellen, Ellen Chauncey. She also gets better acquainted with John Humphreys, who comforts her many times after the other children tease her. Ellen comes to realize that if she hadn't needed to be separated from her mother, she might never have met Alice and John.

About a year later, one day when Ellen visits town, she overhears from some ladies' conversation that her mother has died. Devastated, she turns to Alice and her Bible for comfort. She stays with Alice and John until Aunt Fortune becomes ill and Ellen must look after her. Eventually Aunt Fortune recovers and Ellen returns to Alice and her other friends.

After Mr. Van Brunt's mother dies, he decides to marry Aunt Fortune; soon after, Alice tells Ellen that she is very ill and will soon be "going home" to Heaven; Ellen is not to grieve for her but to trust in God. She also invites Ellen to take her place in the Humphreys household. Ellen immediately moves in and begins by nursing Alice through her final weeks. After Alice dies, Ellen turns to John for guidance. He takes over as her tutor, spiritual advisor, and guiding light. By the time a Humphreys relative dies in England and John must travel overseas to handle the family's business, Ellen (though sad to see him go) is a stronger person.

One day Nancy visits Ellen, bringing letters she has found while cleaning Fortune's house. They are for Ellen from her mother and express the wish that Ellen go live with relatives in Scotland; after sharing the letters with Mr. Humphreys, Ellen decides she must honor her parents' wishes so the Humphreys send her to Scotland to live with the Lindsays: her grandmother and uncle Lindsay and Lady Keith. They welcome her into their home and find her delightful, but they become very possessive of her and force her to denounce her identity as an American and as a Montgomery. Mr. Lindsay even makes Ellen call him “father” and refers to her as his “own little daughter.” The Lindsays also discourage Ellen's faith, as they don't see religion as being important to someone Ellen's age. Ellen finds it hard to live without her daily hours set aside for studying religion, but still tries hard to live by her faith and everything that John and Alice taught her.

Ellen misses John more than anything, and during a New Year's Eve party at the Lindsays', he shows up asking for her. The Lindsays try to keep them apart, but they are unsuccessful. During their emotional reunion John reminds Ellen to keep her faith; in a few years, when she will be able to choose where she lives, she can return to America and live with him. When Ellen introduces John to the Lindsays, they actually become fond of him. John must soon return to America, but not without promising Ellen that they will be together forever soon. In an unpublished chapter at the end of the book, Ellen returns to America as Mrs. John Humphreys.

== Characters ==
=== Major characters ===
Ellen Montgomery
The story's protagonist. Young and naïve at the story's beginning, Ellen lives happily with her mother as her sole companion and teacher. After being torn away from her mother, Ellen struggles to learn to love God and live a Christian life in the face of adversity.
Mrs. Montgomery
Ellen's mother. Plagued with health problems, Mrs. Montgomery finds comfort only in Ellen and God. Although unable to perform many of the duties of a mother and wife, she does her best to teach Ellen about God and how to be a lady.
Fortune Emerson
Captain Montgomery's half-sister is stern and unfeeling towards Ellen from the beginning. She refuses to let Ellen attend school and even withholds her mother's letter from Ellen.
Alice Humphreys
Daughter of a minister. Kind and gentle, she becomes Ellen's companion and spiritual counselor and helps Ellen find solace in the Lord while living with Aunt Fortune. Eventually Alice becomes sick and dies, but not before teaching Ellen to learn to trust in God.
John Humphreys
Alice's beloved brother. A handsome and charming young man, he becomes as close as a brother to Ellen (as Alice becomes as close as a sister). After Alice's death, John becomes Ellen's guide through the world, teaching her how to be a good Christian and a good person.
The Lindsays
Ellen's family on her mother's side. Grandmother Lindsay; and Mr. Lindsay and Lady Keith, Ellen's uncle and aunt; adopt her readily into their family but become extremely possessive of her and make her denounce her identity as an American and a Montgomery. They also discourage Ellen's devotion to her faith.

=== Minor characters ===
Captain Montgomery
Ellen's negligent father was often away from home and felt little sympathy for wife or daughter during their forced separation.
Mr. Van Brunt
Fortune's farmhand. He is intimidating at first, though Ellen learns to love him. He feels kindly towards Ellen, often defending her when her aunt mistreats her.
Nancy Vawse
A girl who lives nearby with her grandmother, she is thought by most to be "a bad sort"; though Ellen doesn't like her at first, she proves later to be a better person.
Mrs. Vawse
Nancy's grandmother, a kindly old lady who lives on a mountain. She teaches French to Ellen and Alice and later cares for Ellen after Alice dies and John returns to school.
Mr. Humphreys
Alice and John's father, a local minister. He is a quiet man who keeps to himself, though Ellen becomes like a daughter to him and comforts him after Alice dies.
The Marshmans
Humphreys-family friends who live in a nearby town. They are kind to Ellen and treat her well when she is with them.
Ellen Chauncey
A young girl Ellen meets while staying with the Marshmans.
Margery
Alice's loyal servant who came from England with the Humphreys. She helps Ellen learn to take Alice's place in the household.

== Themes ==
This book was originally written with the goal of teaching people a Christian lesson, so many of the themes are Christian in nature and aim to show people how a true Christian ought to live his or her life.

- One of themes present in The Wide, Wide World is that everything in life, even the bad things, is caused by God and leads to something good, especially in the spiritual sense. Ellen is very sad when she learns that her mother must leave, but reminds herself that the trip will make her mother healthy again. When she goes to the store to try to buy some merino cloth, she meets a salesman who treats her very badly and makes her cry, but as a result she gets to know a generous old gentleman who provides her with certain things for her trip that she might not have gotten otherwise. On the steamboat, the other girls make fun of Ellen and send her crying off to another part of the boat, but through this she met a man who teaches her many things about Christianity. When at the Marshmans’ house, she meets children who give her a hard time with her faith, but her friend Alice and Ellen Chauncey are there for her and comfort her. Through this theme, Susan Warner wanted people to see that God did not send misery upon his children for no reason, but used suffering as a means to bring them closer to Him. Ellen learns this and is better able to cope with problems in her life.
- Another theme present in the novel is that there are always good people present among the bad folks. Mr. Saunders, a cold-hearted clerk, is contrasted with an old gentleman who is very kind to Ellen. Captain Montgomery, a man who doesn't seem to care much for his daughter or her mother, is married to Mrs. Montgomery, a kind woman who loves Ellen with all of her heart. Ellen is forced to travel with Mrs. Dunscombe and her daughters, who find pleasure in mocking Ellen and her less-than-ideal clothes. After leaving them, Ellen meets a young man who spends much time with Ellen, teaching her about becoming a Christian and sincerely caring for the little girl. Aunt Fortune, who makes it obvious that Ellen is unwanted at her house, lives close to Mrs. Van Brunt, an older woman who cares for Ellen and acts kindly to her. Ellen meets people at the Marshmans’ Christmas party who give her a hard time on purpose, but she has many friends there as well. This seems to be saying that even though a person might be surrounded with bad people who make everyone around them suffer, there are still many kind people in this world that will offer their help when the time comes. Ellen meets many different kinds of people throughout the story, some of which are annoying and taunt her faith in God, but some who become real friends and shape Ellen's personality.
- A third theme that is present in this book is that those who desire to grow spiritually will receive the help of God if they honestly have that desire. When talking to her mother before the parting, Ellen is determined to live a perfect, Christian life and be an example for everyone around her. However, as soon as she gets on the boat, she discovers that her heart holds negative feelings towards the people around her. After meeting the Christian man on the boat, she realizes how hard her heart is, and her desire to live a good life is rekindled. She fails at this again, however, when she gets to Aunt Fortune's house, where she directly disobeys her aunt and throws fits when things aren't done to her liking. But she realizes her mistakes and wants to be good, and God sends her a young woman who acts as a spiritual guide for the girl. Through this, Warner was telling people not to give up when they made mistakes, and showing how God comes to those who seek him. Since The Wide, Wide World is a Christian book, it aimed to teach readers how seek God and encourage those who didn't exactly know how to go about doing that, but had a true desire to be closer to Him.
- Another theme seen in the story is that God has an unlimited supply of strength, and is willing to give it to anyone who desires it. Poor Ellen went through just about everything in her life. By the age of 10, she was separated from her mother forever, mistreated at the hands of others, mocked for her faith in God, and forced to move from her homeland. However, instead of whining and complaining she asks God to help her, and she is not left alone in this world. Warner knew that times weren't easy for everyone, just like today, and wanted people to know that there was an everlasting source of encouragement available at any time of day, anywhere in the world. She uses Ellen as an example, who doesn't despair but, with God's help, lives happily after she marries John.

== Conflicts ==
The driving conflict of this story is the separation of Ellen from her mother and the effects of this separation on Ellen, including how she misses the mother who had meant everything to her, how she struggles with being a good Christian, and how she deals with people who don't care about her.

- Woman vs. Self

As a work of sentimentalist literature, the conflict created by the story is dealt with almost entirely through the emotional response that Ellen has to the conditions in which she is put in the novel. In this, the main conflicts that Ellen encounters deals with how she can internally deal with each of the emotional problems she is met with in a way that is characteristic of strength and perseverance.

- Woman vs. Nature

Ellen's mother leaving for France due to her sickness is the conflict which sets the entire narrative in motion, which occurs at the very start of the story. The first few chapters deal with how Ellen prepares to cope with the separation while simultaneously ensuring that, on the advice of the doctor, she refrains from causing any extra stress or fatigue on her mother. After her departure, Ellen must come to terms with being able to survive without the one person who truly cared for her.

- Woman vs. God

With her mother's departure, Ellen finds herself doubting God's intentions, and struggles with the idea that she must love God despite the hardships he has given her, chiefly being separated from her mother, and attempt to come to terms with the idea that God has separated Ellen from her mother and sent her to her aunt in order to be taught that strong faith in God is the most important aspect in her life, over and above her love for her mother.

- Woman vs. Society

Most of the personal conflicts with other characters are also dealt with in the internal manner, chiefly the struggles Ellen has in dealing with her callous and uncaring Aunt Fortune, who shows no sympathy for Ellen's sadness in being detached from her mother immediately upon meeting. Aunt Fortune's disregard for the feelings of Ellen leads to most of the external turmoil Ellen faces in the first half of the book, including her indifference to allow Ellen to go to school.

== Literary style ==
There are three main aspects which created Warner's particular writing style in The Wide, Wide World. The first aspect is the time in which the book was written. With Webster having furthered the development of the American dialect with his 1828 publication of the first American dictionary, America was still gaining its own literary voice in 1850 when The Wide, Wide World was published.

It is readily apparent from the first page that this novel's style is archaic with lines such as "Driven thus to her own resources, Ellen betook herself to the window and sought amusement there."

The next aspect of Warner's style is that The Wide, Wide World is also a didactic piece. Warner's style was aimed at giving an accurate portrayal of the social limitations imposed upon nineteenth-century women, and aimed at promoting the benefits of Christian morality. The Wide, Wide World was republished in 1987 by the Feminist Press, showing the claims it holds to furthering gender equality. And one can see that Warner's style was aimed at promoting Christian morals because one of the main themes of this novel is about finding strength in religious devotion.

The Wide, Wide World is a paradigm of sentimentalist literature. The conflict and action of this story are largely introverted within the protagonist Ellen. The lines “Dressing was sad work to Ellen today; it went on very heavily. Tears dropped into the water as she stooped her head to the basin,” are found in a four-page stretch within which Ellen cries on five separate occasions, displaying how sentimental Warner's style was.

Along with being a piece of sentimentalist literature, the work is considered an example of the domestic novel. The Wide, Wide World adheres to the basic plot of most women's fiction novels of the time, which, as Nina Baym describes the genre in Woman's Fiction, involves "the story of a young girl who is deprived of the supports she had rightly or wrongly depended on to sustain her throughout life and is faced with the necessity of winning her own way in the world.”

== History ==
"Published at the end of 1850, The Wide, Wide World by Susan Warner went through fourteen editions in two years, and may ultimately have been as popular as Uncle Tom's Cabin with 19th-century American readers".

Although it was first rejected by many publishers, Warner's first novel became an instant sensation among its readers. The novel paints an excellent picture of the Victorian era of the United States, and so the readers of the time appreciated its relevancy to their own lives. (Jo March reads the book in Little Women.)

Pushing Christian values and themes, The Wide, Wide World was a guide to young ladies of the time who were encouraged to have submissive and humble attitudes towards their elders, especially men. The novel also portrayed a part of the author's own life: While Ellen's mother died when Ellen was young, Warner's mother had died when Warner was nine years old. Warner then went to live with her aunt, who was much kinder than Ellen's Aunt Fortune.

In 1987, the Feminist Press published a new edition, including the concluding chapter which had been left out by the previous publishers.
