= David Everett =

American newspaper editor, proprietor, and poet

David Everett (March 29, 1770 – December 21, 1813) was an American newspaper editor, proprietor, and poet.

Everett was born at Princeton, Massachusetts in 1770, and educated at Dartmouth College where he graduated around the year 1795. He was the editor of a newspaper in some part of the state of New Hampshire in the early part of his life. He was afterwards one of the editors and proprietors of the Boston Patriot.

He wrote a volume of essays in prose, entitled Common Sense in Dishabille and a work upon the Prophecies. His poetry consists of a few short pieces, and a tragedy called Daranzel, or the Persian Patriot, which was acted and published at Boston in 1800.

A number of his poems have been reprinted in collections since his death,

He died in 1813 in Marietta, Ohio, aged 43.
