= Susan Warner =

American writer (1819–1885)

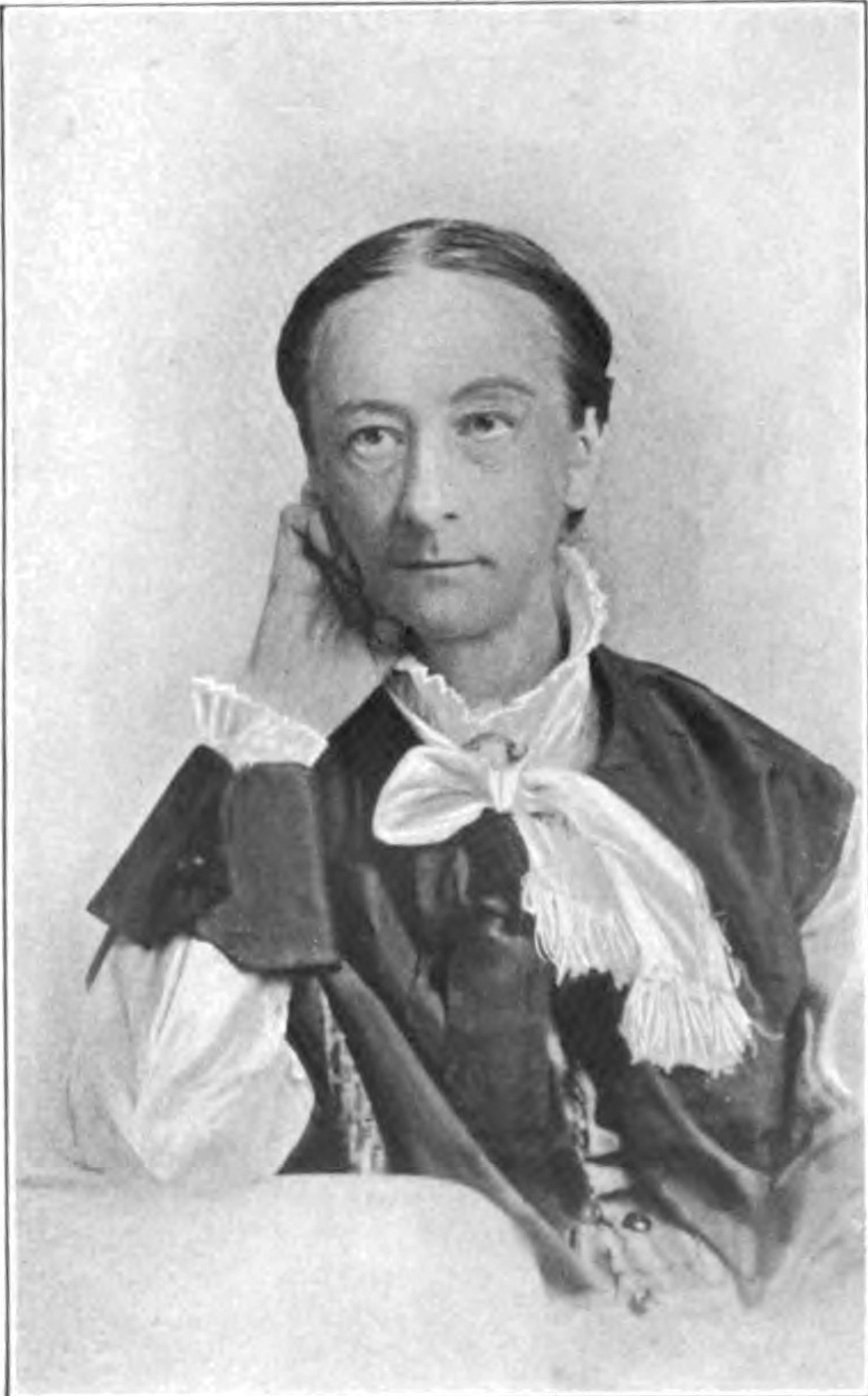
- Born: Susan Bogert Warner; July 11, 1819; New York City, New York, U.S.
- Died: March 17, 1885 (aged 65); Highland Falls, New York, U.S.
- Resting place: West Point Cemetery
- Occupation: Writer
- Relatives: Anna Bartlett Warner (sister)
- Writing career
- Pen name: Elizabeth Wetherell
- Language: English
- Notable work: The Wide, Wide World

Susan Bogert Warner (pen name, Elizabeth Wetherell; July 11, 1819 – March 17, 1885) was an American Presbyterian writer of religious fiction, children's fiction, and theological works. She is best remembered for her massive bestseller The Wide, Wide World. Her other works include Queechy, The Hills of the Shatemuc, Melbourne House, Daisy, Walks from Eden, House of Israel, What She Could, Opportunities, and House in Town. Warner and her sister, Anna, wrote a series of semi-religious novels that had extraordinary sales, including Say and Seal, Christmas Stocking, Books of Blessing (in 8 volumes), and The Law and the Testimony.

== Early years and education ==
Susan Warner was born in New York City, July 11, 1819. Warner could trace her lineage back to the Puritans on both sides. Her father was Henry Warner, a New York City lawyer originally from New England, and her mother was Anna Bartlett, from a wealthy, fashionable family in New York's Hudson Square. When Warner was a young child, her mother died, and her father's sister, Fanny, came to live with the Warners. Though the father had been wealthy, he lost most of his fortune in the Panic of 1837 and in subsequent lawsuits and poor investments. The family had to leave their mansion at St. Mark's Place in New York and move to an old Revolutionary War-era farmhouse on Constitution Island, near West Point, New York. In 1849, seeing little change in their family's financial situation, Susan and Anna started writing to earn income.

== Career ==
She wrote, under the name of "Elizabeth Wetherell", thirty novels, many of which went into multiple editions. However, her first novel, The Wide, Wide World (1850), was the most popular. It was translated into several other languages, including French, German, and Dutch. Other than Uncle Tom's Cabin, it was perhaps the most widely circulated story of American authorship. Other works include Queechy (1852), The Law and the Testimony, (1853), The Hills of the Shatemuc, (1856), The Old Helmet (1863), and Melbourne House (1864). In the nineteenth century, critics admired the depictions of rural American life in her early novels. American reviewers also praised Warner's Christian and moral teachings, while London reviewers tended not to favor her didacticism. Early twentieth-century critics classified Warner's work as "sentimental" and thus lacking in literary value. In the later twentieth century, feminist critics rediscovered The Wide, Wide World, discussing it as a quintessential domestic novel and focusing on analyzing its portrayal of gender dynamics.

Some of her works were written jointly with her younger sister Anna Bartlett Warner, who sometimes wrote under the pseudonym "Amy Lothrop". The Warner sisters also wrote children's Christian songs. Susan wrote "Jesus Bids Us Shine" while Anna was author of the first verse of the well-known children's song "Jesus Loves Me", which she wrote at Susan's request.

Both sisters became devout Christians in the late 1830s. After their conversion, they became confirmed members of the Mercer Street Presbyterian church, although in later life, Warner became drawn into Methodist circles. The sisters also held Bible studies for the West Point cadets. When they were on military duty, the cadets would sing "Jesus Loves Me." The popularity of the song was so great that upon Warner's death, she was buried in the West Point Cemetery.

Susan Warner died in Highland Falls, New York and is buried in the West Point Cemetery.

== List of works ==
- The Wide, Wide World, 1850; Die weite, weite Welt, Leipzig: G. H. Friedlein 1853
- Queechy, 1852
- The Law and the Testimony, 1853
- The Hills of the Shatemuc: In Two Volumes, 1856
- Say and Seal, 1860
- Melbourne House, 1864
- What She Could, 1871
- The Flag Of Truce, 1874
- My Desire, 1879
- The End of A Coil, 1880
- Nobody, 1882
- The Letter of Credit, 1887
- The House in Town: A Sequel to "Opportunities", 1871
- Willow Brook, 1874
- Mr. Rutherford's children, Volume 1, 1853
- Opportunities: A Sequel to "What She Could.", 1871
- The Word: Walks Form Eden, 1866
- Bread and Oranges, 1875
- The Old Helmet, 1864
- Carl Krinken: His Christmas Stocking, 1854
