= Maria Susanna Cummins =

American novelist (1827–1866)

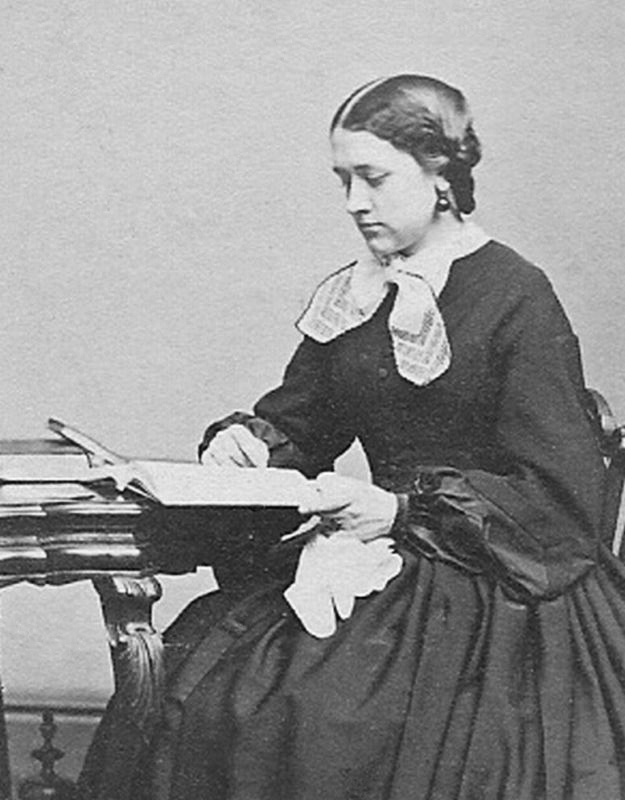
- Born: April 9, 1827; Salem, Massachusetts
- Died: October 1, 1866 (aged 39); Dorchester, Massachusetts
- Occupation: Novelist
- Writing career
- Genres: Romance, girls' books
- Notable work: The Lamplighter (1854)

Maria Susanna Cummins (April 9, 1827 – October 1, 1866) was an American novelist. She authored the novel The Lamplighter (1854).

== Biography ==
Maria Susanna Cummins was born in Salem, Massachusetts, on April 9, 1827. She was the daughter of David Cummins and Maria F. Kittredge, and was the eldest of four children. The Cummins family resided in the neighborhood of Dorchester in Boston, Massachusetts. Cummins' father encouraged her to become a writer at an early age. She studied at Mrs. Charles Sedgwick's Young Ladies School in Lenox, Massachusetts.

In 1854, she published the novel The Lamplighter. One reviewer called it "one of the most original and natural narratives". Within eight weeks, it sold 40,000 copies and totaled 70,000 by the end of its first year in print. She wrote other books, including Mabel Vaughan (1857).

Cummins died in Dorchester after a period of illness on October 1, 1866, aged 39.

== Selected bibliography ==
- 1854 : The Lamplighter
- 1857 : Mabel Vaughan
- 1860 : El Fureidis
- 1864 : A Talk About Guides
- 1864 : Haunted Hearts
- 1865 : Around Mull
