= Richmond Theatre (Richmond, Virginia) =

Theatre in Richmond, Virginia

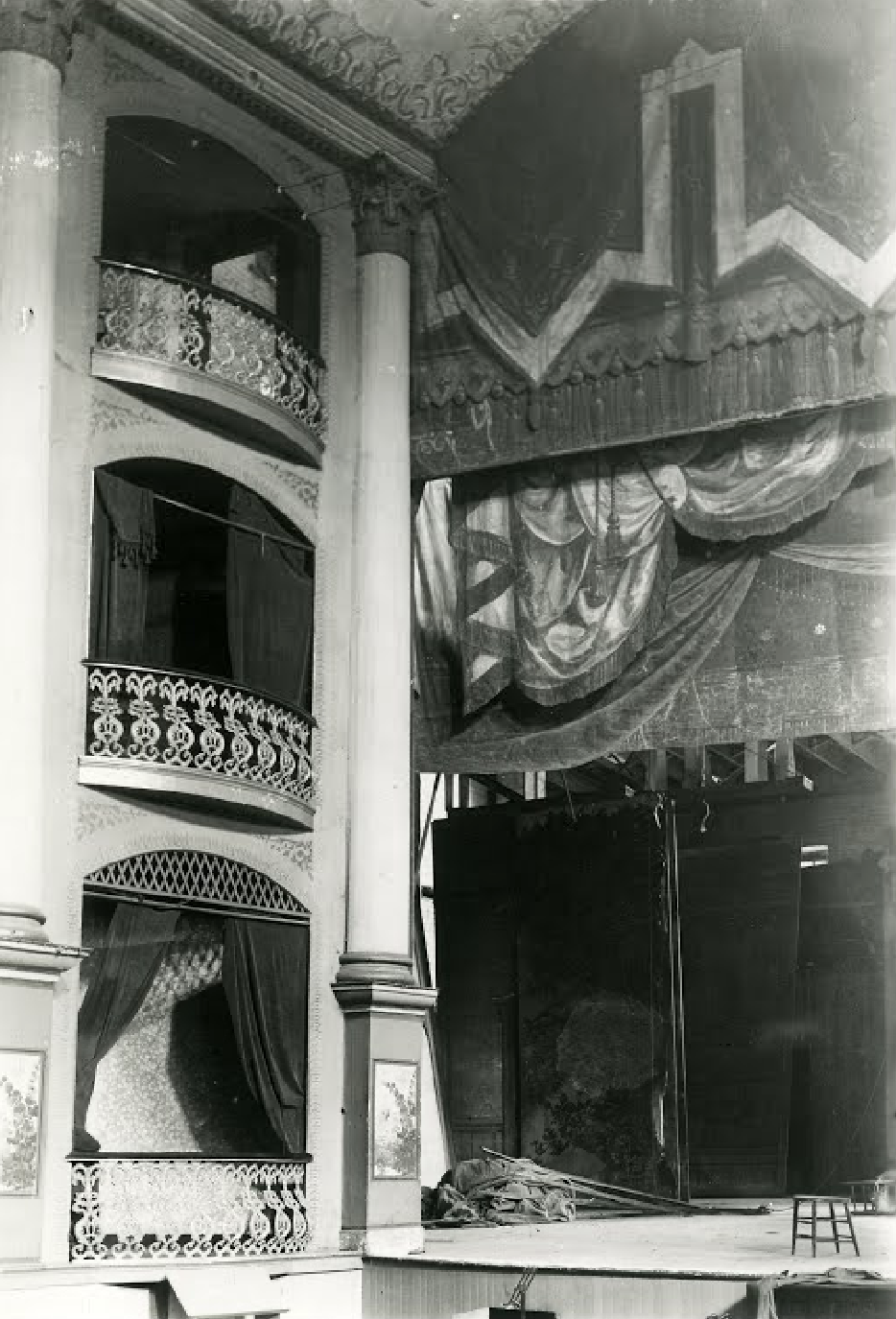
Interior of the New Richmond Theatre from c. 1890. Photograph by Edyth Carter Beveridge.

The Richmond Theatre was the name of four theatres located in Richmond, Virginia, in the United States. The first theatre was originally established in 1786 as the Academy of Fine Arts and Sciences of the United States or Quesnay's Academy. It was renamed the Richmond Theatre after it came under the management of Thomas Wade West and John Bignall. It was destroyed by fire in 1798. The second Richmond Theatre opened in 1806 on the same site and was destroyed by fire in 1811. The 1811 Richmond Theatre fire is considered a significant disaster in the history of the city, and was described by historian Meredith Henne Baker as "early America's first great disaster".

The third Richmond Theatre opened in 1819 on a different site. After being remodeled in 1838, the theatre re-opened as the Marshall Theatre. It too was destroyed by fire, in 1862. The Marshall Theatre was rebuilt on the same foundation and re-opened in 1863. It was originally called the New Marshall Theatre during construction, but was ultimately branded the New Richmond Theatre soon after it opened. It became a significant cultural center for the Confederate south during the American Civil War. By the time this fourth and final structure was demolished in 1896 it was known as the Richmond Theater. The various theatres known as the Richmond and Marshall theatres were the leading performance venues in Richmond for the majority of the 19th century.

== First Richmond Theatre, originally Quesnay's Academy (1786–1798) ==
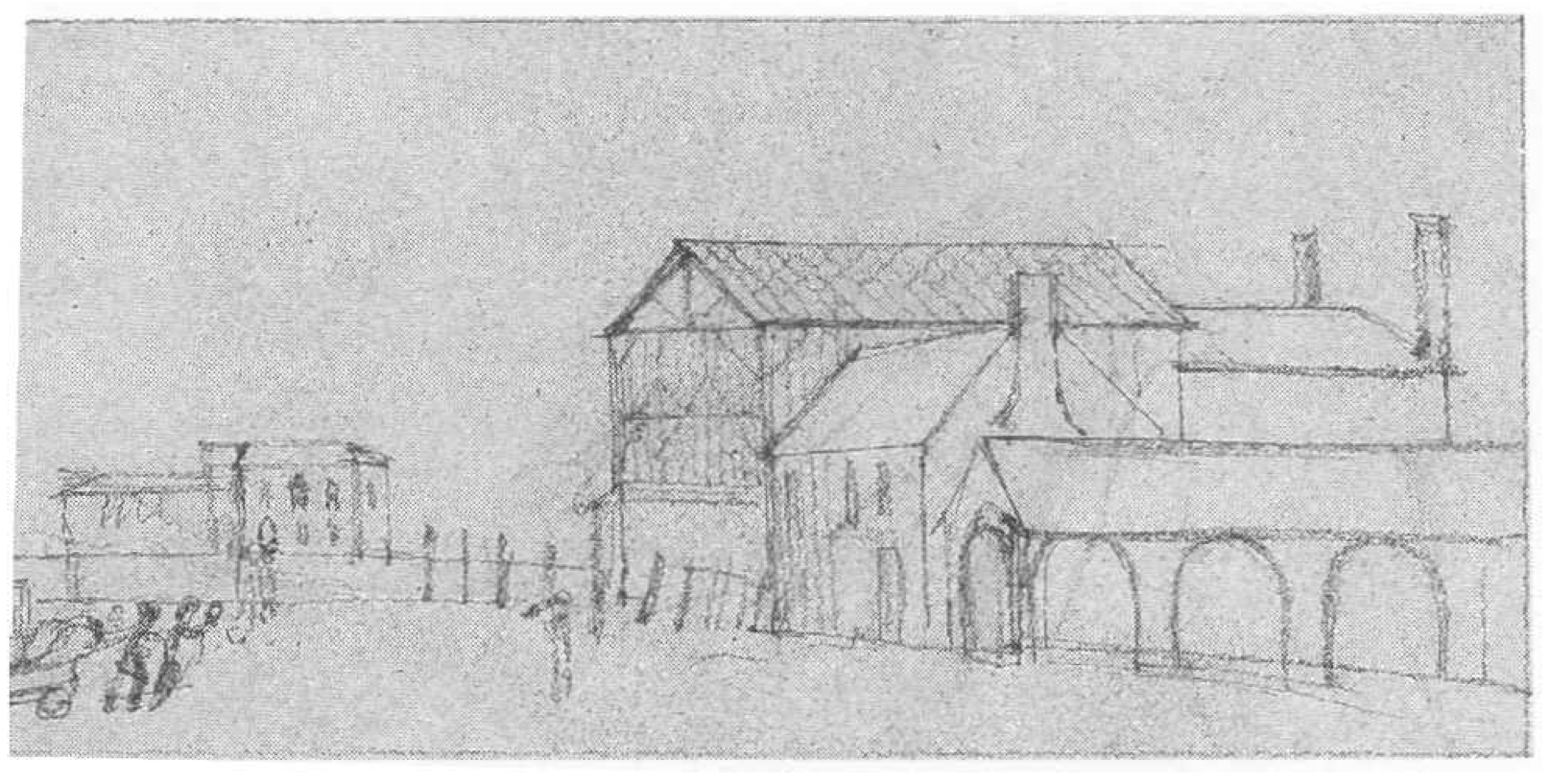
C. 1797–1798 Drawing of the first Richmond Theatre by Benjamin Henry Latrobe

The first Richmond Theatre was originally intended to be not only a theatre, but a school, museum, and art gallery housed collectively under the name of the Academy of Fine Arts and Sciences of the United States. The idea for this organization originated with the French scholar and soldier Chevalier Alexandre-Marie Quesnay de Beaurepaire who had come to the United States in March 1777 to fight in the American Revolutionary War. Quesnay intended to create an American organization modeled after the French Academy of Sciences (also known as the National Institute of Sciences and Arts).

After nearly a decade of advocacy by Quesnay, a three and a quarter acre plot of land was purchased for 300 pounds from John Turpin on May 20, 1786, through funds raised through subscription to Quesnay's Academy. This land was located at the brow of Shockoe Hill. At the time, the main road on Shockoe Hill did not extend to the property, and as part of the land sale agreement, Turpin paid for the extension of the road and the creation of Academy Square where Quesnay's Academy was to be constructed. The cornerstone of the building was laid by Richmond's Masonic Lodge No. 13 on June 24, 1786. The building's cornerstone was placed at the Northeast corner of the building. The front of the building was situated on what is now 12th street, and was located at what is now the intersection of 12th and Broad just north of Capitol Square. (37°32′20″N 77°25′48″W) The academy was built with a "barn-like wooden structure".

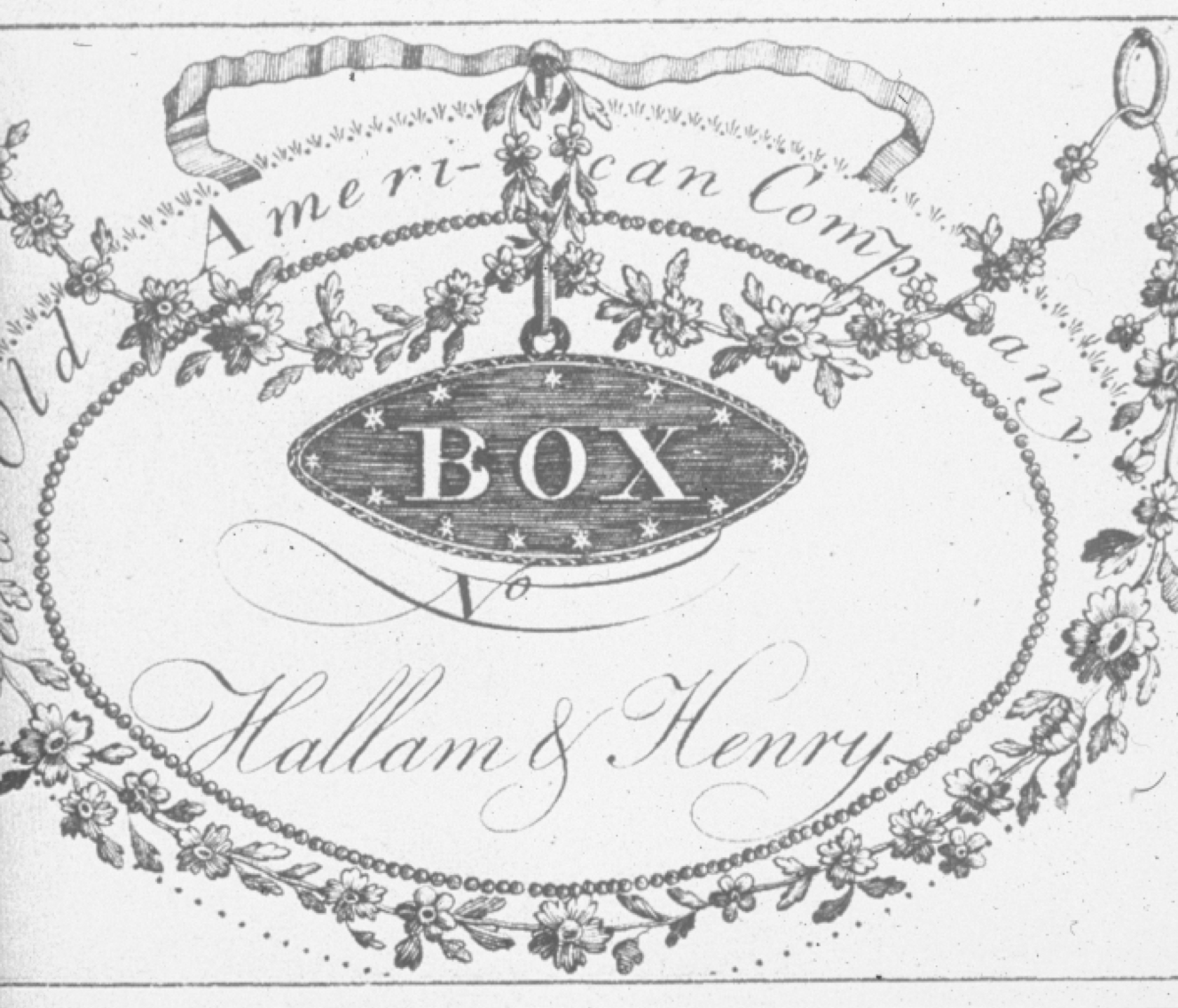
1780s theatre ticket by the Old American Company

Quesnay's Academy (QA) opened on October 10, 1786, in a performance given by the Old American Company of Comedians under the management of Lewis Hallam Jr. and John Henry. Sources vary as to which work was performed on this date, with some sources claiming it was the opera Poor Soldier and others the play School for Scandal. Regardless, sources agree that the repertoire of Hallam and Henry's season in Richmond included the stage works Poor Soldier, School for Scandal, and Alexander the Great ; or , the Rival Queens.

Quesnay's dream of an institution mirroring that of the French Academy of Sciences was short lived. Social prejudices against the morality of the theatre made operations of such an institution challenging, and he was forced to publicly make it clear that there was separation between the scholars studying at the QA and the visiting theatre troupes utilizing the QA's theatre. Quesnay himself taught dance classes at the academy, but by December 1887 Quesnay's Academy ceased operation.

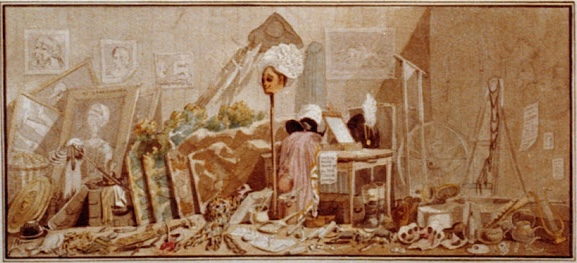
1798 Drawing of the green room of the first Richmond Theatre by Latrobe

Theatre managers Thomas Wade West and John Bignall took over the QA, and made significant alterations to the QA and its theatre. It was renamed the Richmond Theatre, and at this time Academy Square became known as Theatre Square. West and Bignall continued to operate the theatre until it was destroyed by fire on January 23, 1798.

Quesnay's theatre building had a capacity of 1600 people The Virginia Ratifying Convention of 1788 was held there beginning on June 2 for three weeks, after having begun previously at a smaller structure at Cary and fourteenth streets then temporarily serving as Virginia's capitol building. Among the many individuals in attendance were James Madison, John Marshall, James Monroe, Edmund Pendleton, George Wythe, George Nicholas, Edmund Randolph, George Mason, Richard Henry Lee, and Patrick Henry.

== Second Richmond Theatre (1806–1811) ==
=== Operational and performance history ===
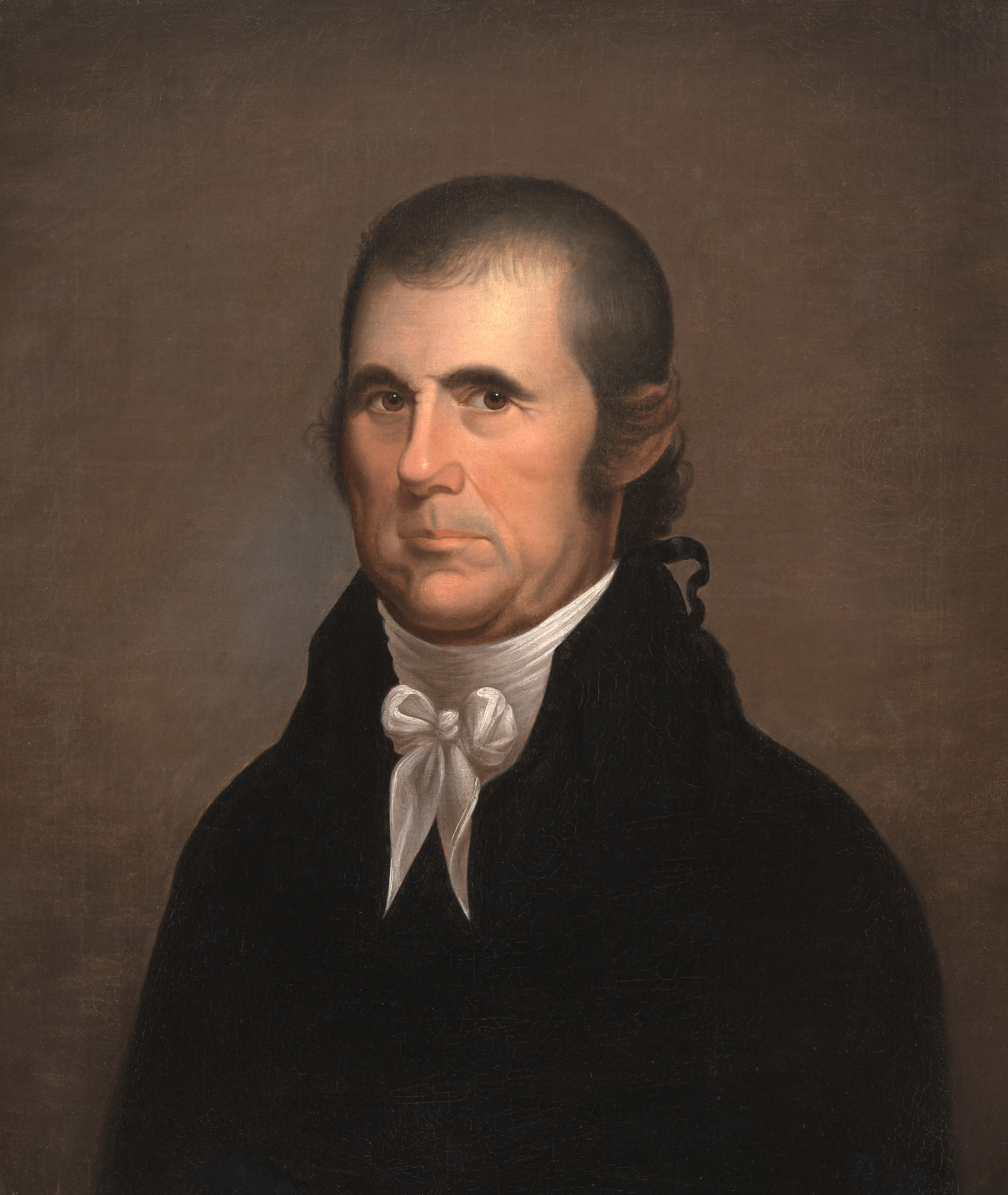
Portrait of John Marshall by Cephas Thompson from c. 1809–1810. Marshall played an instrumental role in getting the second Richmond Theatre built.

The second Richmond Theatre was built on the same site as the first theatre, and was erected through the advocacy of John Marshall who was serving as Chief Justice of the United States at the time of the theatre's construction. Through Marshall's efforts, the funds to build this theatre were raised through subscription and construction on the theatre began in 1804. This second theatre was made from brick instead of wood and stood three stories high. It opened on January 25, 1806, and was referred to in the Richmond Enquirer as both the "New Theatre" and the "Richmond Theatre". It was financially profitable during its five-year history.

The second Richmond Theatre was initially inhabited by the West and Bignall theatre company. One of the early plays staged at the theatre in 1806 included William Dunlap's English language version of Jean-Henri-Ferdinand Lamartelière's 1799 play Abelino ou le Grand Bandit (English: Abaellino, the Great Bandit), a work often misattributed to Friedrich Schiller. The theatre was then taken over by a company led by Thomas Abthorpe Cooper whose first appearance in Richmond was in the title role of William Shakespeare's Hamlet in April 1806. Cooper performed several more parts at the Richmond Theatre in the following months, among them Rolla in August von Kotzebue's The Virgin of the Sun; the gambler Beverly in Edward Moore's The Gamester; Pierre in Thomas Otway's Venice Preserv'd; and the title roles in several more Shakespeare plays, including Othello, Macbeth, and Richard III.

Other works performed at the Richmond Theatre in 1806 included the plays Speed the Plough (1806) by Thomas Morton, The Irishman in London by William Macready the Elder, The Sailor's Daughter by Richard Cumberland; and the ballad opera The Devil to Pay by Charles Coffey and John Mottley.

=== Richmond Theatre fire of 1811 ===
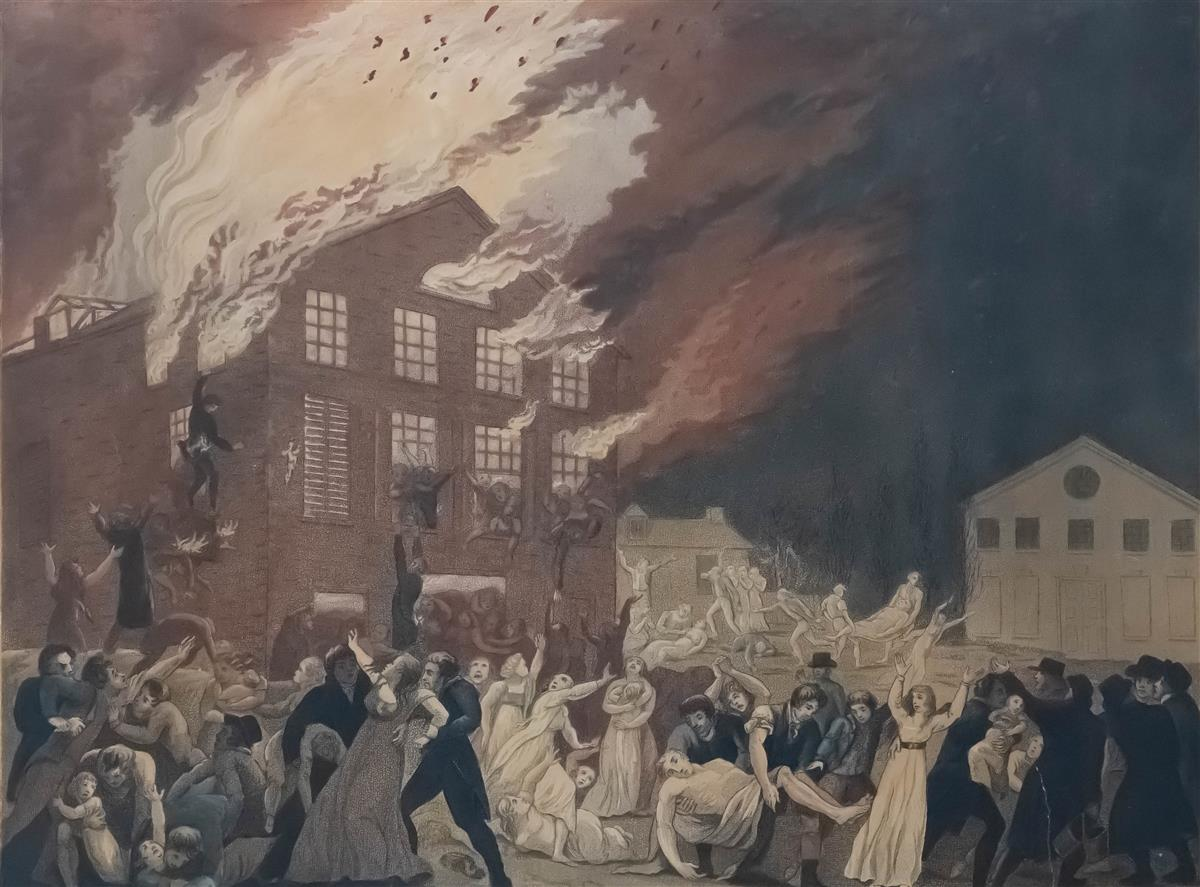
Painting of the second Richmond Theatre being destroyed by fire in 1811 by Benjamin Tanner (1775–1848)

The Richmond Theatre was destroyed by fire on December 26, 1811, in what historian Meredith Henne Baker described as "early America's first great disaster". The fire broke out during a benefit performance held in honor of the French actor Alexander Placide and his daughter, actress Jane Placide. The repertoire for that evening included two full-length plays as well as four musical works performed by the theatre's orchestra between the plays. The first play was Denis Diderot's comedy Le Père de famille given in an English language translation entitled The Father; or, Family Feuds by Louis Hue Girardin who was then principal of the Hallerian Academy and was formerly a professor of modern languages at the College of William & Mary.

The second play given was Matthew Gregory Lewis's melodrama Raymond and Agnes; or, the Bleeding Nun which also incorporated aspects of British pantomime. After the first act of this second play, a chandelier with lit candles was raised by one of the stage hands, and it swung and caught fire to the backdrop which was made of paper. The fire spread across the ceiling of the building and set the roof ablaze. Within ten minutes the fire had spread throughout the building.

The audience in the Richmond Theatre on the night of the fire totaled more than 600 people, and the building had only three exits, causing congestion as people tried to flee through the theatre's three exits. John Marshall was one of several men living close to the theatre who left their homes to attempt to rescue people from the burning theatre. A minimum of 76 people died in the fire, making it the most deadly urban disaster in the history of the United States up to that point in time. Several prominent Virginia citizens died in the fire, including Virginia's governor George William Smith; former United States Senator Abraham B. Venable; lawyer Benjamin Botts who defended Aaron Burr during his conspiracy trial; and Mary Clay, the daughter of congressman Matthew Clay.

Monumental Church stands on the former site of the Richmond Theatre. Built between 1812 and 1814, the church contains a crypt where 72 victims from the Richmond Theatre fire are buried.

== Third Richmond Theatre, also known as Marshall Theatre (1819–1862) ==
=== Third Richmond Theatre ===
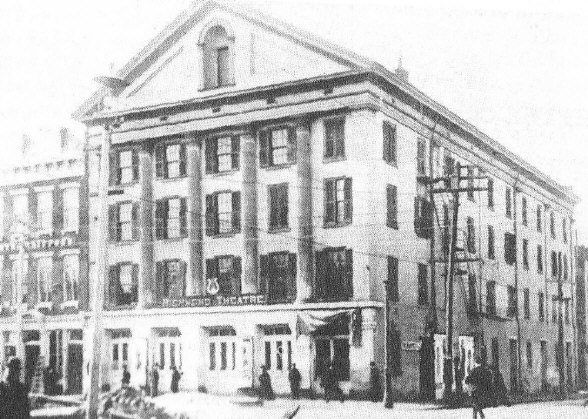
The third Richmond Theatre, as photographed in 1858

==== Operational history ====
After the devastating 1811 fire, there was tremendous opposition to rebuilding of a theatre in Richmond, and in general there was a wave of opposition against theatrical enterprises that extended across America in the years immediately following that disaster. Construction on a new theatre did not begin until seven years later when Christopher Tompkins was successful at convincing the public to allow him to build a theatre for a stock company. Tompkins sold the property he owned at the southeast corner lot on Seventh and H (later called Broad) Streets (37°32′29.0″N 77°26′8.5″W) to the English-born actor Joseph George Holman with the intent that Holman would build a theatre for his company on the property. However, Holman died in 1817, the year construction on the theatre began.

The building of the third Richmond Theatre was done by what was called "subscription", where a group of individuals would invest money in the theatre and essentially own stock in the theatre enterprise. A total of 104 investors, most of them local to Richmond, owned shares in the theatre with approximately $40,000.00 worth of shares sold. Many of them were prominent citizens of Virginia, including Virginia's governor William H. Cabell, justice John Marshall, journalist Thomas Ritchie, and banker James Rawlings (ca. 1788–1838) who was president of the Farmers’ Bank of Virginia. The business side of the theatre was run by a board elected by the shareholders, with Ritchie elected as the board's first chairman. The board was responsible for leasing the building and the initial lessee was the South Carolina composer and theatre manager Charles Gilfert (1787–1829) Gilfert was also an investor in the theatre and was married to actress Amelia Holman Gilfert, the daughter of the aforementioned Joseph George Holman, who had inherited her father's financial investments into the enterprise. She starred in many productions at the theatre after it opened in 1819.

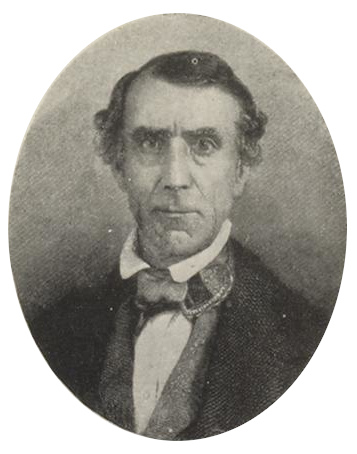
James H. Caldwell

The third Richmond Theatre was a more spacious building than its predecessors, and Gilfert was careful to advertise the many doors extant in the new theatre's design as to make quick exits possible in light of public fears after the 1811 fire. It opened on June 11, 1819. There were still public fears over fire, particularly in regards to a structure next door to the theatre that was viewed by the public as a fire hazard. Accordingly, that property was purchased by the governing board of the Richmond Theatre shortly after it opened, and it was razed in order to alleviate public concerns over another fire.

Gilfert and his company leased the Richmond Theatre for five years. University of North Texas scholar Martin Staples Shockley stated that Gilfert's company was "perhaps the best [theatre] company in America during that time." However, while the quality of productions were high, the theatre failed to turn a profit; partly due to mismanagement and partly due to persistent fears among the public towards attending theatres following the 1811 fire. After Gilfert left in October 1823, the board found it difficult to find a long-term replacement to lease the theatre. In the succeeding years share prices in the theatre dropped significantly, and the theatre was occupied by a series of traveling theatre companies of lesser quality. The James H. Caldwell company occupied the theatre for a brief season in 1824, and the theatre was mainly inactive after this until 1827. The theatre was used intermittently between 1827 and 1834 under several different managers.

Due to the increase of Richmond's population during the Virginia Constitutional Convention of 1829–1830, the year 1829 was a very busy year at the Richmond Theatre, with three different theatre seasons offered by three different companies in rapid succession; totaling more performances than any other year in Richmond between the years 1826–1845. That same year the theatre underwent some remodeling and repairs. After this, performances tended to be variety theatre presentations, rather than legitimate theatre, and the theatre's use significantly dropped with on average only one month of use per year. The theatre fell into disrepair and closed after it was sold in 1838.

==== Performance history ====
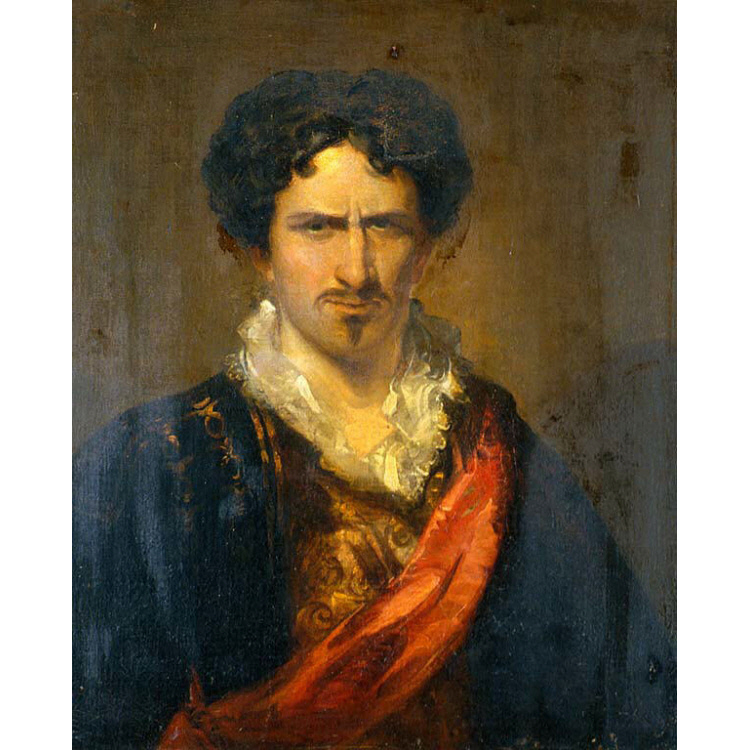
Junius Brutus Booth as Sir Edward Mortimer in The Iron Chest, one of several parts Booth portrayed at the Richmond Theatre

Between 1818 and 1838 there were a total of 30 theatre seasons presented at the third Richmond Theatre (RT) by more than ten different professional acting companies. Collectively, these seasons consisted of more than 300 different plays staged across more than 800 performances. The repertoire of these seasons, while a mix of works by both British and American playwrights, tended to emphasize theatrical works imported from England. In addition to the theatre companies, the theatre also had a resident orchestra which was acknowledged as one of the better quality orchestras in America during that period. However, despite the quality of its players, the orchestra's repertoire was criticized for its lack of sophistication. An article in the Virginia Patriot stated of the orchestra

If it is one of the best orchestras in America they are shamefacedly indifferent for their selection and performance, for in place of the divine airs of Handel, Haydn, Mozart, &c I have heard nothing better than a few Waltzes, Marches, Scotch Airs, &c and the same ones repeated night after night.

Several of the plays staged at the RT were adapted into English from foreign language plays; often by uncertain authors. For example, Gilfert's first season at the RT in 1819 included a production of The Maid and the Magpie; a play originally in the French language under the title La Pie voleuse ou la Servante de Palaiseau which was written by Louis-Charles Caigniez. Caigniez's play was first adapted into English as The Maid and the Magpie by English dramatist Samuel James Arnold, and was later adapted again in different English language versions by English playwrights Isaac Pocock and Thomas John Dibdin and by American playwright John Howard Payne. It is therefore uncertain, which of these many English adaptations was utilized by Gilfert and his company at the RT in 1819, although it was most likely by one of the British writers and not Payne.

On July 6, 1821, the celebrated English actor Junius Brutus Booth gave his first performance in the United States at the RT in the title role of Shakespeare's Richard III. In 1822 Gilfert's company staged an English language production of German playwright August von Kotzebue's Die Sonnen-Jungfrau (English: The Virgin of the Sun). The company could have used any one of multiple extant English language adaptations; including ones by British writers Frederick Reynolds and Anne Plumptre, or one by American playwright William Dunlap.

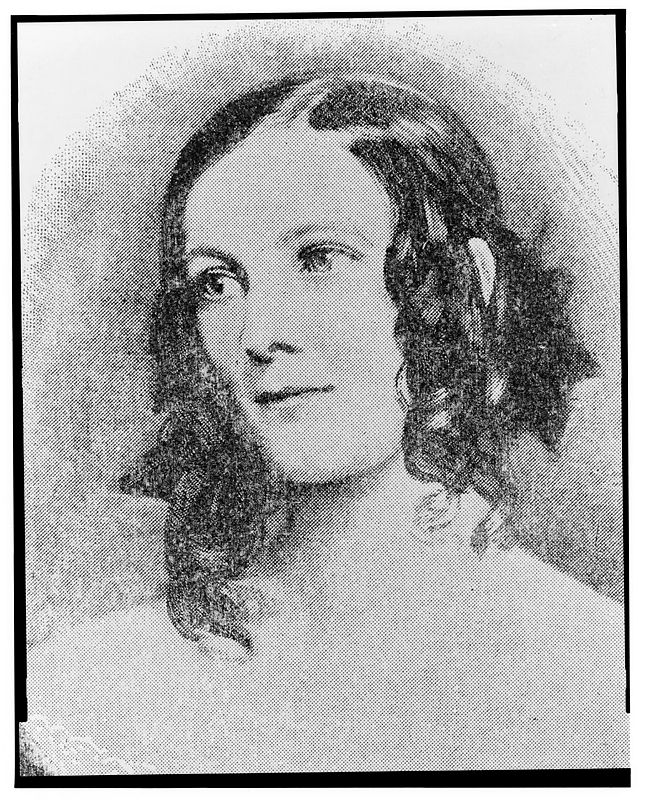
Priscilla Cooper Tyler

The theatre did stage numerous plays by Dunlap during its twenty-year history, among them Thirty Years, or The Life of a Gambler, Fraternal Discord, and Dunlap's adaptation of Edward Fitzball's play The flying Dutchman, or, the phantom ship. It is possible that Dunlap's English language adaptation of Kotzebue's 1790 play Menschenhass und Reue, The Stranger; or, Misanthropy and Repentance, was used when it was staged at the theatre. Likewise, Dunlap's Pizarro adapted from Kotzebue's Die Spanier in Peru may have been used, but there were many other English language adaptations of that work known on the American stage of the period that could have also been utilized, among them Richard Brinsley Sheridan's Pizarro.

In 1828 the RT staged two plays by Richmond native Stephen T. Mitchell, including The Maid of Missolonghi, which was based on a poem by Lord Byron.

Future First Lady of the United States Priscilla Cooper Tyler worked as an actress at the RT prior to her marriage to Robert Tyler, the son of United States president John Tyler. She was a member of the Compact Corps Dramatique stock company which was headlined by her father, the esteemed English actor Thomas Abthorpe Cooper. Before her arrival in Richmond, reviews of her performances had been less than enthusiastic; although reviewers did not review her harshly and were kind if tepid using words like "promising", or "as yet undeveloped" in reviewing her work. This was most likely out of respect for her father. However, her abilities as an actress were much appreciated by the Richmond public and press, and she received very positive reviews, the best of her career, while performing in that city.

Priscilla and her father starred in nineteen performances with the Compact Corps Dramatique stock company at the RT from December 7, 1836, through April 10, 1837. Their repertoire included John Tobin's The Honey Moon with Priscilla as Juliana and her father as Duke Aranza; Shakespeare's Othello with Priscilla as Desdemona and her father in the title role; James Sheridan Knowles's The Hunchback with Priscilla as Julia; Elizabeth Inchbald's Wives as They Were and Maids as They Are with Cooper as Sir William and Priscilla as Miss Dorillon; and Shakespeare's Much Ado About Nothing with Priscilla as Beatrice and her father as Benedict.

=== Marshall Theatre ===
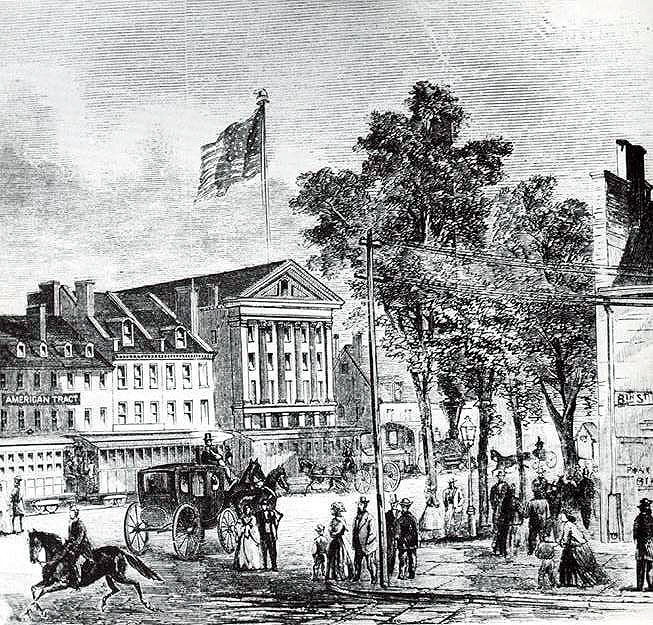
c. 1840s sketch of the Marshall Theatre

By 1838 the third Richmond Theatre had fallen into serious disrepair and the theatre was closed after being sold to Major S. Meyers. It went under significant alterations and renovations, and it re-opened as the Marshall Theatre on November 14, 1838. It was named after justice John Marshall. While the theatre's first few seasons offered dramas and sophisticated music, the economic depression of the 1840s following the Panic of 1837 ultimately led to abandoning more elaborate staged productions, and the theatre was used as a venue for traveling minstrels and variety acts of a novel nature.

Once the economy had sufficiently recovered, a permanent stock company was established at the theatre in 1845; although it was not consistently profitable until the 1850s. Ethelbert A. Marshall (more commonly known as E. A. Marshall) was head of the stock company from 1847 to 1849, and his company included the actors Charles Burke (1822–1854) and George Jordan. In 1850 the theatre was one of the stops for the famous soprano Jenny Lind, popularly referred to as the "Swedish Nightingale".

In 1854 the theatre staged an adaptation of the pro-slavery novel The Cabin and Parlor; or, Slaves and Masters by Charles Jacobs Peterson; a work written in response to the anti-slavery novel Uncle Tom's Cabin which was later revived at the theatre in February 1861. The work was highly political and was a tool of propaganda to bolster Southern national identity in the years leading up to Secession in the United States. This was just one example of a genre of Southern play which used themes of "white supremacy" and "Northern villainy" to promote Southern nationalism.

In May 1855 the Marshall Theatre was purchased by Elizabeth McGill. In 1856 the theatre's management was taken over by the team of George Kunkel (1821–1885), Thomas L. Moxley (died 1890), and John T. Ford, the latter of whom founded the Ford's Theatre in Washington, D.C. Ford left the partnership a few years in, but Kunkel and Moxley remained in charge of the theatre until the spring of 1861. The team of Kunkel, Moxley, and Ford had previous experience in entertainment but were inexperienced in staging serious dramas. To mitigate their lack of knowledge, they hired the actor Joseph Jefferson to be their stage manager who served in that role in the 1856–1857 season. Jefferson was successful in raising the quality of productions at the Marshall Theatre, and was able to bring several well-known American actors to the Richmond stage, including the actress Charlotte Cushman and actor Edwin Forrest.

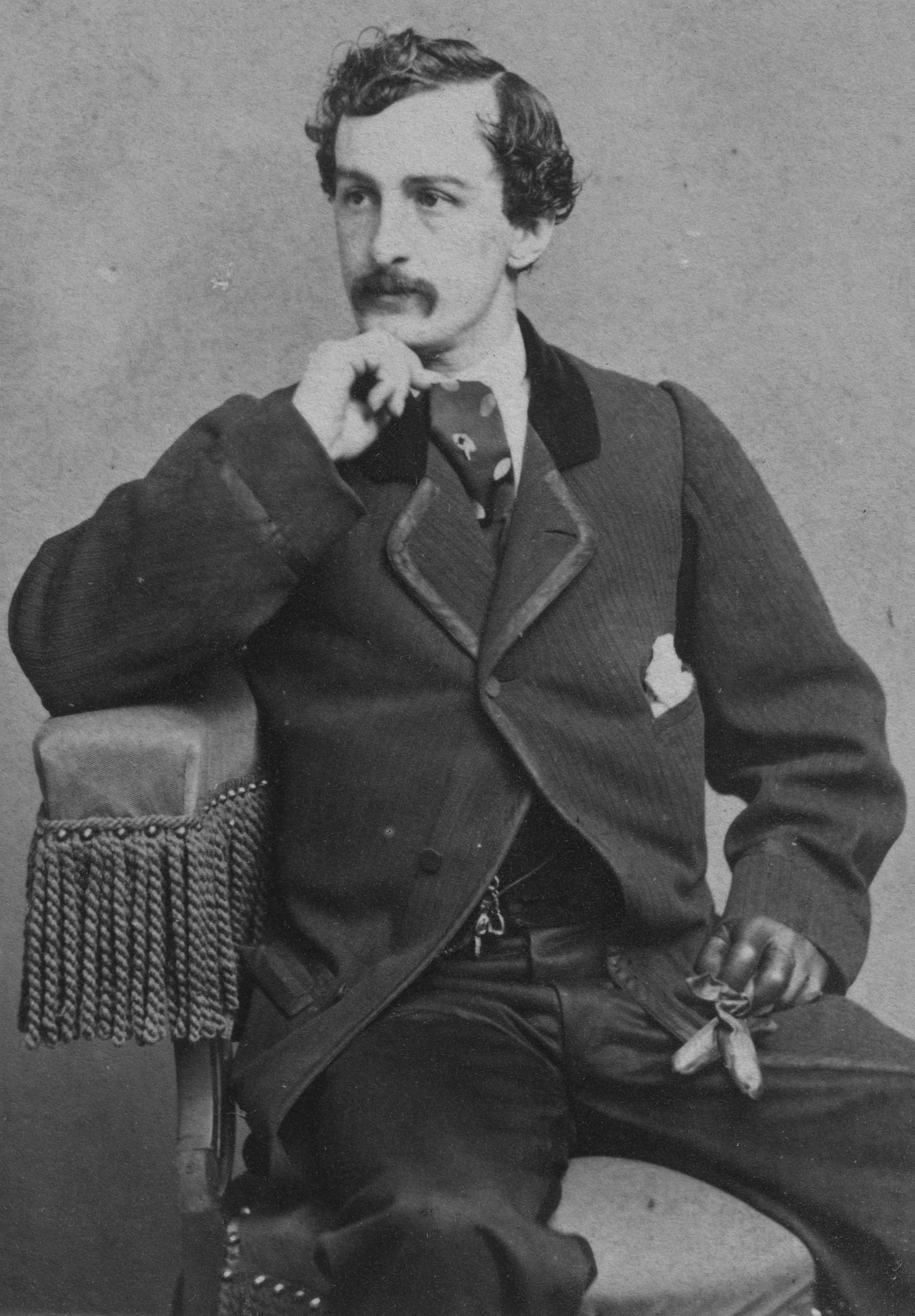
John Wilkes Booth

Prior to the 1850s, American theatre was dominated by celebrity actors from Europe. Theatre historians refer to the 1850s as "America's age of actors" because it was the beginning of a period when American-born actors experienced a surge of popularity among the American public. The Marshall Theatre during this period staged works starring several well-known American actors of the period, including brothers Edwin and John Wilkes Booth, and John Drew, as well as the aforementioned actors Cushman and Forrest.

John Wilkes Booth, who later achieved notoriety for the assassination of Abraham Lincoln, joined the permanent company of players at the Marshall Theatre in 1858, and remained until 1860 when he began a national tour. He had a particular triumph at the theatre as Shakespeare's Richard III. His brother Edwin, who was nearly five years older, had been performing on the Marshall stage since 1856; often playing the title roles in tragedies like Richard III, Richelieu, King Lear and Henry V. Together, the Booth brothers starred in several Shakespeare plays at the Marshall Theatre, among them Hamlet with Edwin in the title role and John Wilkes as Horatio. Richmond-based sculptor Edward Virginius Valentine was a friend of the Booth brothers, and made a bust of Edwin Booth from life during the 1858 theatre season.

The actors John Brougham and William Evans Burton toured to the theatre in February 1858 where they performed a highly modified version of The Merry Wives of Windsor billed as "Shakespeare's corrected comedy" with Burton as Falstaff and Brougham as 'The Host of the Garter'.

Composer and playwright John Hill Hewitt became manager of the theatre in October 1861. The first play he staged at the theatre was James Planché's The Loan of a Lover on November 2, 1861. Just two months later the theatre was destroyed by fire on January 2, 1862. The fire broke out in the theatre on the morning of January 2 and spread to several of the surrounding businesses and houses, many of which were also destroyed. Hewitt and the actor Richard D'Orsey Ogden were both asleep in the theatre when the fire broke out, and while they managed to escape with their lives, they both suffered severe burns.

After the fire, Hewitt's company remained active in alternative locations in Richmond until a new theatre was built. The troupe had lost all of their music instruments, costumes, sets, and sheet music in the fire; and their ability to quickly shift to a new venue and continue performing was a testament to their resilience. The actor Ben DeBar and his wife were actors in Hewitt's troupe at the time of the fire.

== New Richmond Theatre, also known as New Marshall Theatre and Richmond Theater (1863–1896) ==
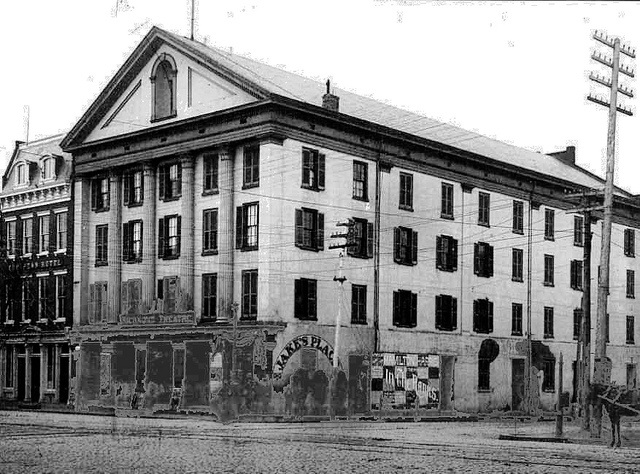
1892 photo of the New Richmond Theatre. It was called the New Marshall Theatre during construction and was briefly called the Marshall Theatre when it opened in 1863. It was quickly re-named the New Richmond Theatre.

=== Construction and opening ===
After the Marshall Theatre's destruction by fire in 1862, the theatre was rebuilt later that year on the same site at 7th and Broad streets by contractors Joseph Hall and John F. Regnault at a cost of $75,000. The materials to build the theatre had to pass through the Union blockade during the American Civil War. Called the New Marshall Theatre during construction, it was referred to as simply the Marshall Theatre in the Richmond Dispatch when it opened with a production of Shakespeare's As You Like It on February 9, 1863. However, later in the week, advertisements for that production began calling the theatre the New Richmond Theatre. Eventually the theatre became known as the Richmond Theater, its name at the time it closed 33 years later.

When the New Richmond Theatre opened, Confederate Civil War general Joseph E. Johnston described the filled to capacity theatre as full of "government clerks, soldiers, speculators, and hangers-on of every description" who were seeking "elegance and comfort in the Confederacy". The theatre's inauguration also featured the announcement of the winner of a poetry competition whose prize money was the substantial sum of $300.00. (As of March 2026 equivalent to $10,380.38) Entries were submitted before the theatre opened, and the winner was announced at the theatre's opening night. Poet Henry Timrod was awarded the prize, and the actor Walter Keeble read his poem, "Laureate of the Confederacy", which included the following stanza:

Shut for one happy evening from the flood
That roars around us, here you may behold—
As if a desert way Could blossom and unfold
A garden fresh with May—
Substantialized in breathing flesh and bloody Souls that upon the poet's page
Have lived from age to age
And yet have never donned this mortalclay.

=== Confederate cultural center ===
==== Overview ====
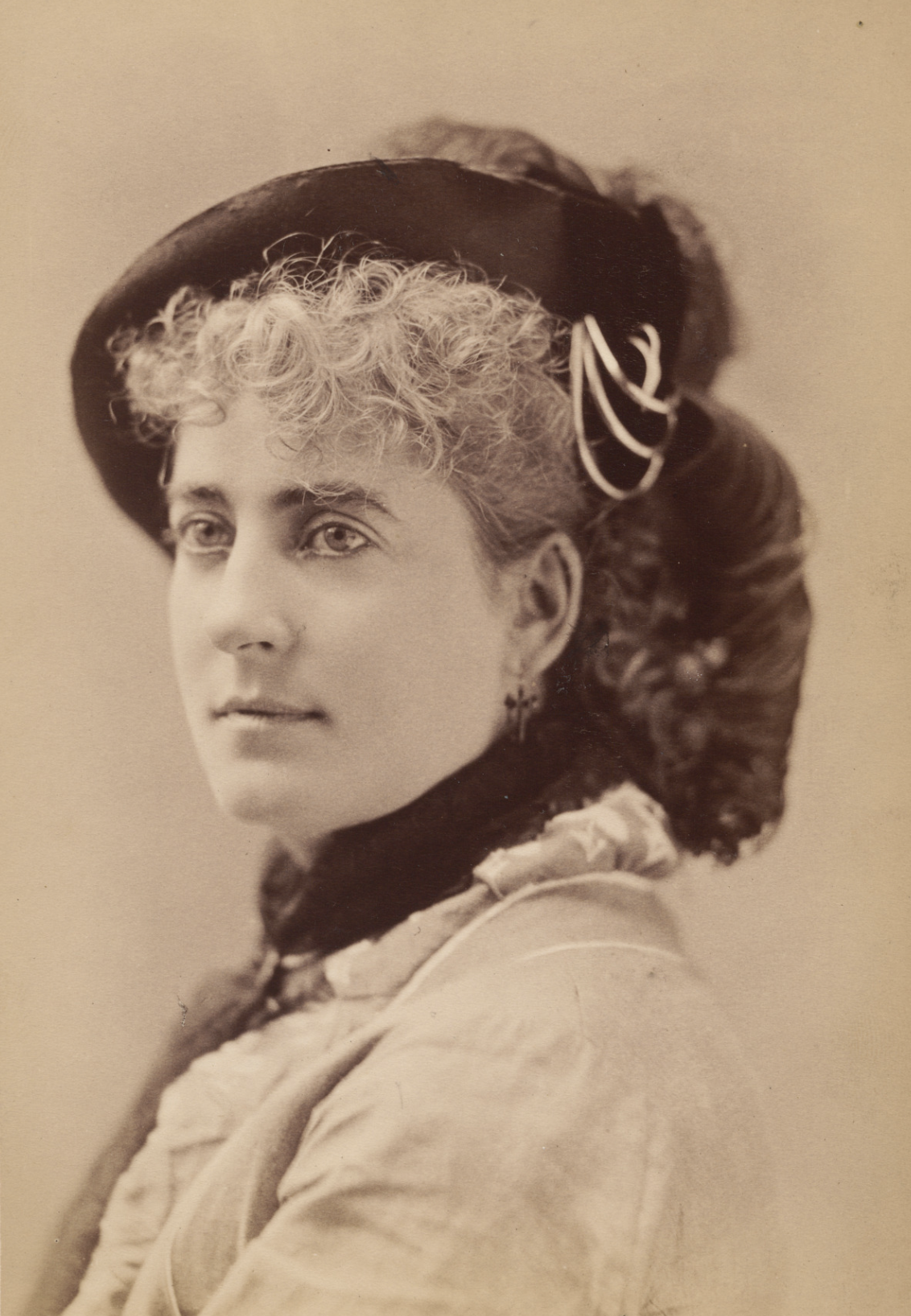
Actress Ida Vernon (c. 1880). During the American Civil War she was a resident player at the New Richmond Theatre.

The New Richmond Theatre (NRT) remained busy throughout the American Civil War, and became a cultural center for the Confederate south.More than 400 different plays were staged at the theatre during the Civil War; among which were roughly 60 new works. The theatre scene in Richmond was bolstered during this time by those wishing to demonstrate the intellectual adeptness of Confederate society while simultaneously being challenged by those who perceived the theatre to be an immoral institution. Theatre historian Elizabeth Reitz Mullenix stated the following:

Analysis of theatre during the Civil War is crucial, for it represented a shift of national expressions of culture. Richmond's values, along with those of the entire South, changed dramatically because of sectional crisis, and the theatre both influenced the construction—and reflected the transformation—of this national identity.

Theatre entertainment was viewed as an essential support for the Southern war effort, and well-known actors, musicians, and other entertainers were exempt from conscription until nearly the end of the war. War weary soldiers as well as the general public came to the theatre as a place of escape as well as for entertainment. Rather than see a decline in theatre attendance, the war years in Richmond saw a significant increase in the demand for the theatre entertainments among a rising population due to war activity. The population of Richmond more than quadrupled in size during the war, creating a need to increase the number of performances at existing theaters and to create more entertainment venues to meet a surging demand.

The owner of the NRT was Mrs. Elizabeth McGill, and Hewitt was the first theatrical manager at the theater. McGill and Hewitt did not get along well, and she fired him in June 1862. Richard D'Orsey Ogden replaced him as manager, and C. A Rosenberg was hired as the theater's musical director at the same time. Among the leading actors in the NRT's company were Harry Macarthy, Edmund R. Dalton, Theo Hamilton, Walter Keeble, and Charles Morton. Leading actresses of the company included Clementine Debar Booth, sisters Ella and Eliza Wren, Eloise Bridges, Ida Vernon, and Lucille Weston.

==== Repertoire ====
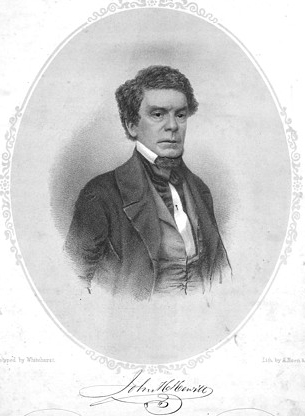
J. H. Hewitt, "Bard of the Confederacy"

Ogden frequently programmed plays by Shakespeare, using versions originally crafted by David Garrick that had been further modified by John Philip Kemble. Ogden himself made additional changes to these versions of Shakespeare's plays. Macbeth was the most frequently performed work during his tenure but the company also performed other tragedies like Julius Caesar and King Lear and comedies like The Taming of the Shrew. Some of the other plays in the company's repertoire during the war years included John Maddison Morton's Box and Cox, John Webster's The Duchess of Malfi, Oliver Goldsmith's She Stoops to Conquer, Richard Brinsley Sheridan's The Rivals, and multiple plays by writers Dion Boucicault, Augustin Daly, James Planché, Charles Selby, Eugène Scribe, Charles W. Taylor, and Tom Taylor. Particularly popular with Richmond audiences was Douglas Jerrold's Black-Eyed Susan. The company also staged plays based on novels by Alexandre Dumas, Walter Scott, and Ellen Wood.

Original works staged at the NRT during the Civil War were by theme war plays. They all had similar components that included making the hero of the work a young Southern cavalier or plantation owner, and casting a Northern gentleman of similar social standing as the Union villain. Other characters that appeared in these Confederate melodramas included a portrayal of the virtues of Southern womanhood through the character of the cavalier's wife or betrothed, and a faithful servant or slave who was gifted at minstrelsy. John Hill Hewitt penned the first of these Confederate war dramas, The Scouts; or. The Plains of Manassas, which was used to nostalgize the Antebellum South and promote Southern national identity; an ideology necessary for the Confederate States of America's success. Well received, it is one of the few Confederate war plays that has survived, with most of the other plays of this genre only being known through newspaper accounts.

Hewitt created over a dozen more original war plays, among them The Log Fort; or. Woman's Heroism, The Prisoner of Monterey; or. The Secret Panel, The Scouts; or. The Plains of Manassas, and The Vivandière. Hewitt's large output of plays and songs during the war earned him the moniker "Bard of the Confederacy". He stated the following about his work writing plays for the NRT during the war:

Military dramas, suiting the pulse of a military audience, proved a great feature. They were all replete with the most gushing patriotism.

In terms of quality, the most successful war play staged at the NRT was James D. McCabe's The Guerrillas, which had its premiere at a different theatre in Richmond, the Richmond Varieties, on December 22, 1862. Highly popular with Richmond audiences, it was first staged at the NRT on May 26, 1863. The play was set during the American Revolutionary War and followed the experiences of three generations of the same Virginia family during those events. The play sharply criticized the Northern United States; emphasizing its brutality. It too has survived.

The greatest popular success at the NRT was the war musical The Virginia Cavalier (1863), which used lyrics by George W. Alexander, Commandant of the Castle Thunder Confederate prison. Also a surviving play, the work was largely a knock-off of the earlier The Guerrillas, containing an almost identical plot. It starred the actress and singer Sallie Partington who was one of the performers who starred in the New Richmond Theatre's inaugural production of As You Like It. Her performance in The Virginia Cavalier popularized the song "The Southern Soldier Boy", and it was published by George Dunn in 1863. Other original Confederate plays that premiered at the NRT included J.J. Delchamp's Love's ambuscade ; or The sergeant's stratagem; and the anonymous farce Great Expectations; or. Getting Promoted. The latter work was a searing critique of corruption among Confederate quartermasters.

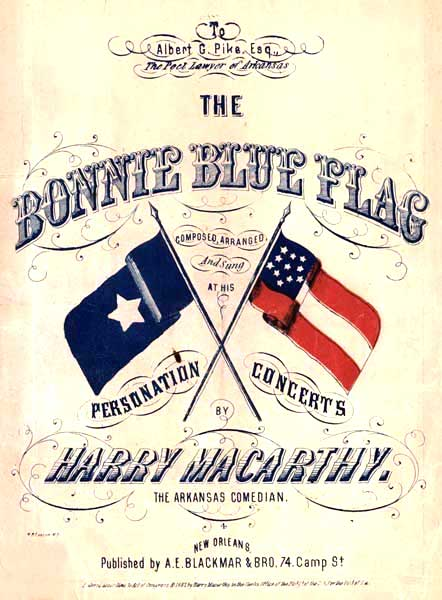
1861 sheet music for "The Bonnie Blue Flag"

Also popular at the theatre was the songwriter and showman Harry McCarthy who specialized in comedic impersonations as well as singing his original tunes. He presented his Personation Concerts at the New Richmond Theatre not long after it opened, and his song "The Bonnie Blue Flag", which he performed with his partner, the actress Lottie Estelle, was a tremendous hit.

As the war progressed, maintaining a roster of high caliber talent proved to be difficult, and the quality of productions suffered as a result. The NRT increasingly moved away from serious dramatic repertoire and more towards sensational works of lesser quality; largely to meet the tastes of the general populace in order to maintain robust ticket sales. Critics in local papers did not hold back in responding with sharp negative reviews to the lowering standards of the theatre. One particularly controversial play which was both reviled and praised by different writers in Richmond newspapers was the play Angel of Death which premiered on December 12, 1863. Some writers accused it of blasphemy for its depictions of Biblical subjects in a secular and scandalous fashion, and others derided it for its horrible literary craftsmanship. One paper attacked the play for the clothing of the actresses playing the angel which was sexually charged and described as a "flesh costume" which "began too late and left off too soon". Yet, other papers gave high critical praise to the work. The Magnolia wrote the following in its review:

All the striking and attractive features claimed for it by the management have been fully realized in the representation; and by universal acknowledgement it is one of the most remarkable creations upon the modern stage. No spectacular Drama that we have ever seen, approaches the Angel of Death, in its features of scenery, situation, and poetical imagery.

The controversy surrounding the Angel of Death made it appealing to curious audiences, and was an example of how the NRT used sensation to keep audiences coming back to its theatre.

==== Wartime challenges ====
The NRT continued to operate without interruption through the first part of 1864. For a period of several months plays ceased after a production of The Ghost of the Dismal Swamp which was presented in May 1864 just prior to the Richmond–Petersburg campaign. At this point in time the practice of exempting actors from conscription ended. Ogden himself was arrested for avoiding conscription in October 1864 and was put into the Castle Thunder prison; ultimately being sentenced to three months of hard labor on December 29, 1864. After Ogden's arrest Edmund R. Dalton succeeded him as the NRT's manager for a brief period before the owner, Mrs. McGill, ultimately ended up managing the theatre herself.

While the military threat to Richmond and conscription effectively put an end to the staging of plays for a period in 1864, it did not shut down the theatres. Other types of entertainment continued to appear on the NRT stage, including variety and minstrel shows. The NRT resumed staging plays in October 1864 with a production of Po-Ca-Hon-Tas. Women increasingly took on roles traditionally played by men, as the number of male actors in the company shrank to nearly nothing due to conscription. The theatre maintained a busy schedule, playing to packed houses even as Richmond's situation became increasingly dire due to the military blockade. Three new plays to the NRT's repertoire were added in March 1865: Planché's Nell Gwynn, William Henry Oxberry's Norma, and Daniel Auber's opera, Fra Diavolo. Norma was performed at the theatre on April 1, 1865. At the time of Richmond's surrender on April 2, 1865, the theatre was then occupied by "Budd and Buckley's Minstrels and Brass Band".

=== Reconstruction era ===
==== Post-war 1860s ====
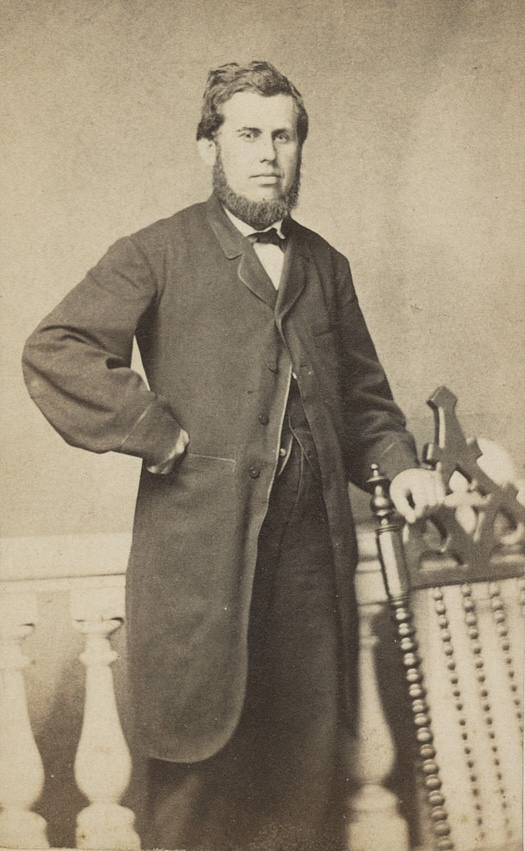
John T. Ford

The New Richmond Theatre remained under Ogden's management through November 1867. It was the site of the founding convention of the Conservative Party of Virginia which began on December 11, 1867.

In January–February 1868 the NRT was leased to John Brougham who began a short season at the theatre starring in his own play The Lottery of Life. Later in February 1868 the theatre was briefly leased to the actress Emily Eliza Saunders, known as Lady Don, who was married to Sir William Don, 7th Baronet. She starred in the plays Kenilworth and the Pretty Horsebreaker, Henry Thornton Craven's Meg's Diversions, and Orpheus and Eurydice. In June 1868 the theatre was leased to the Excelsior Dramatic Association. In September 1868 a lecture entitled “The Humors of Reconstruction” was given at the theatre by James P. Cowardin. Cowardin was the son of a powerful newspaper publisher in Richmond and used this lecture to lampoon the political conflict between politicians Thomas Bayne and Joseph R. Holmes. The repertory company of the Holliday Street Theater in Baltimore toured to the theatre for performance in October 1868. A company led by actress Laura Keene occupied the theatre in December 1868.

The Richmond Musical Benevolent Association leased the theatre in January 1869 for performances of Haydn's oratorio The Creation, and a concert of opera excerpts that included music from Don Giovanni, Il trovatore, La traviata, and The Ring Cycle. In February 1869 the theatre was host to LaRue's Minstrels, and also presented concerts starring the Norwegian violinist Ole Bull. In March 1869 the theatre presented a series of German language operas starring Marie Frederici, including The Magic Flute, Der Freischütz, and Martha. In late March and early April 1869 the theatre held performances by the Hanlon Brothers acrobatic troupe.

As of April 5, 1869, advertisements for the Richmond Theatre listed John T. Ford as the lessee and manager of the theatre; beginning with a season of plays starring the comedian Charles B. Bishop and sisters Ella and Blanche Chapman. Some of the plays staged under his leadership in 1869 included F. C. Burnand's Ixion, and John Beer Johnstone's Ben Bolt. Caroline Richings and her opera company toured to the theatre in May 1869. In September 1869 the theatre was presenting performances by Skiff & Gaylord's Minstrels; a minstrel show founded in Philadelphia and financially backed by Coal Oil Johnny.

Ford was listed as the lessee of the theatre a month later. The year concluded with a production of The Hidden Hand Or, Old Virginia As It Was starring actor Harry Watkins and his wife Rose. The play was based on the novel The Hidden Hand by E. D. E. N. Southworth.

==== 1870s, 1880s, and 1890s ====
In January 1870 the Richmond Theatre (RT) was leased to "La Rue's Carnival Minstrels and Burlesque Opera Troupe". The Chapman sisters and Charles Bishop were once again starring at the theatre in a series of comedies in February and early March 1870. After they left, Ford was once again the lessee of the theatre from February through April 1870. Ford brought in productions of Masks and Faces starring actress Laura Keene, The Field of the Cloth of Gold starring Alice Oates (billed as Mrs. James A. Oates), and an opera season starring tenor Pasquale Brignoli, soprano Isabella McCulloch, contralto Antonia Henne, baritone Egisto Petrilli, and bass Domenico Locatelli. Operas performed included Il trovatore, Lucia di Lammermoor, and Lucrezia Borgia. In May 1870 Caroline Richings and her opera company were engaged at the theatre with a company led by singers Emma Howson, Annie Kemp Bowler, and Henri Drayton.

After several months of inactivity, performances resumed at the RT in September 1870 with Ogden returning to manage the theatre. Among the stage plays programmed by Ogden in the fall of 1870 were Frou-Frou, School for Scandal, Rip Van Winkle, and William T. Peterschen's pantomime The Green Monster, or, The White Knight and the Giant Warrior. In November 1870, Ogden brought productions from Washington, D.C.,'s National Theatre to the RT, including a production of East Lynne starring Frank Mordaunt and Ida Vernon. The Christmas season of 1870 included a pantomime version of Three Blind Mice. Ogden continued to manage the RT into January 1871 with Damon and Pythias staged at the theatre by him.

In March 1871 the English-born Canadian humorist and temperance movement lecturer Edward Carswell gave a public lecture at the theatre. The theatre closed for several months to undergo repairs, re-opening on September 25, 1871, with a production of The Lady of Lyons.

In October 1871 a Mrs. W. T. Powell was listed in an advertisement in the "Amusements" section of the Richmond Daily Dispatch as the Proprietress of the Richmond Theatre. Mrs W. T. Powell was in fact the new married name of Elizabeth McGill after her second marriage. She had owned the theatre since it was built, and continued to do so until her death in 1893. She continued to manage the theatre until 1889 when Thomas Glenron Leath took over that role. Leath was the final manager of the theatre.

The theater closed in March 1895, and was sold by Col. John Murphy to a clothing manufacturer in February 1896. It was demolished in 1896.
