= Richmond Theatre fire =

1811 fire in Virginia, US

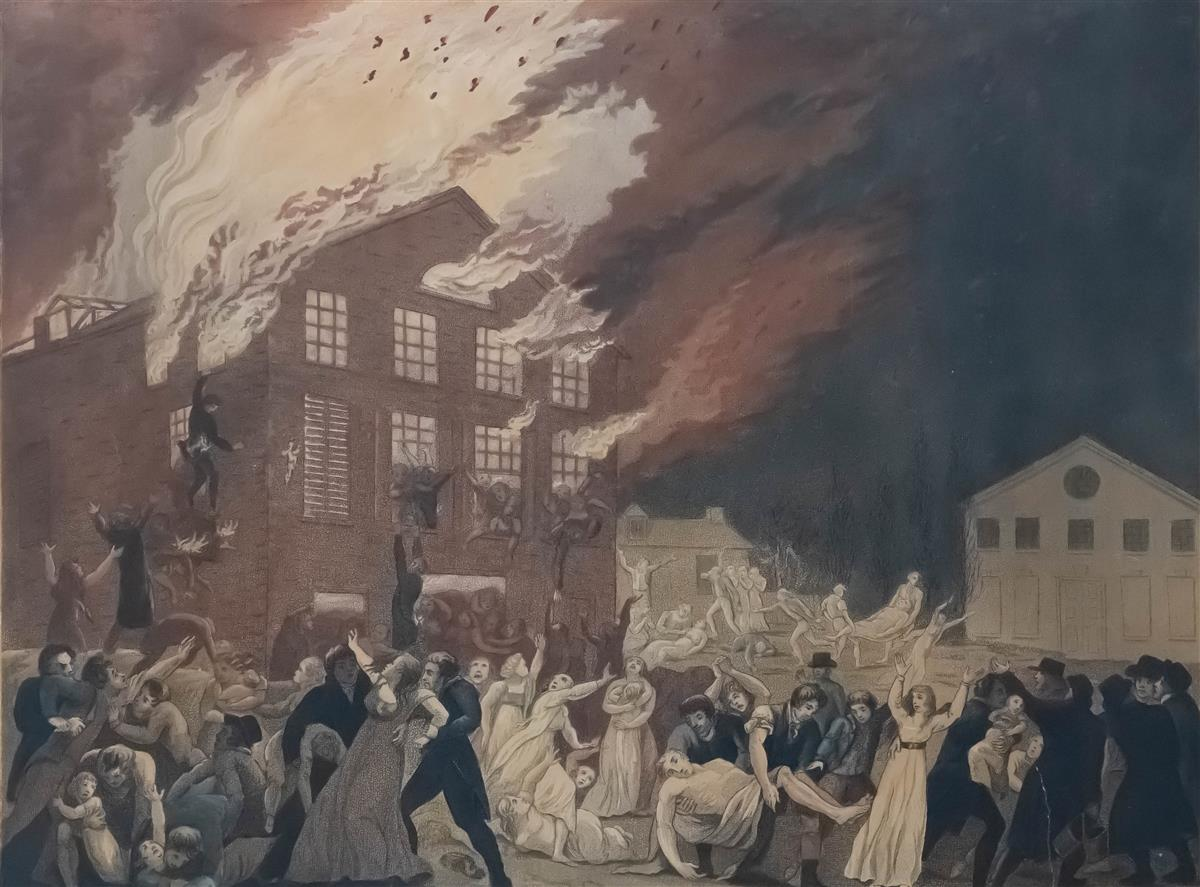
- Richmond, Virginia, theatre fire of 1811
- Date: December 26, 1811
- Venue: Richmond Theatre
- Location: Richmond, Virginia, U.S.; 37.538902°N 77.429876°W
- Type: Fire
- Deaths: 72

The Richmond Theatre fire occurred in Richmond, Virginia, United States, on Thursday, December 26, 1811. It devastated the Richmond Theatre, located on the north side of Broad Street between what is now Twelfth and College Streets. The fire killed 72 people, including Virginia's governor George William Smith, former U.S. senator Abraham B. Venable, and other government officials in what was the worst urban disaster in U.S. history at the time. The Monumental Church was erected on the site as a memorial to the fire.

== Background ==
The Richmond Theatre fire of 1811 was not the first fire to claim a theatre of that name in the city of Richmond. An earlier Richmond Theatre was destroyed by fire on 23 January 1798. That earlier theatre was originally known as Quesnay's Academy (short for its formal title Academy of Fine Arts and Sciences of the United States) and opened on October 10, 1786 in a performance given by the Old American Company of Comedians under the management of Lewis Hallam Jr. and John Henry.

The Academy of Fine Arts and Sciences of the United States was founded by Chevalier Quesnay de Beaurepaire. Quesnay, a Frenchman, had served as an officer in the American Revolutionary War, and he intended to create an American organization that mirrored that of France's French Academy of Sciences. It operated for a brief period as both a theatre and school, ultimately ceasing operation by December 1787. It was then remodeled and renamed the Richmond Theatre by theatre managers Thomas Wade West and John Bignall who operated it until the 1798 fire. During their tenure, the theatre was host to the Virginia Ratifying Convention of 1788 because the building had a capacity of 1600 people, more than the temporary Virginia Capitol building had.

The second Richmond Theatre was built through the advocacy of John Marshall. It was built on the same site as the first Richmond Theatre at what is now the intersection of 12th and Broad just north of Capitol Square. There was an orchestra section, a first balcony, and an upper balcony, with narrow doorways. It opened on January 25, 1806, and it is this theatre that was destroyed in the fire on December 26, 1811.

== Fire ==
The performance on the evening of December 26, 1811, was a benefit for Alexander Placide and his daughter. The program was a double billing: first, a play by Denis Diderot entitled The Father, or Family Feuds, and after it, a pantomime entitled Raymond and Agness, or The Bleeding Nun. The benefit originally had been scheduled for December 23, but was postponed due to the death of Eliza Poe (one of the company's players), Placide's own illness, and foul weather. It being Christmas time and the last opening of the season, the auditorium on December 26 was packed with an excited audience of 598 people, with 518 adults and 80 children to view the pantomime, which commenced immediately after the play was finished. Additionally, 50 people, including free and enslaved Black people, had paid to sit in the gallery.

The fire started after the curtain fell following the first act of the pantomime, when the chandelier was lifted toward the ceiling with the flame still lit. An order was given to lower the chandelier by the property-man, but it became entangled, and he forgot about the chandelier while doing other tasks. The chandelier touched one of the items used in the front scenes, which caught fire. As soon as the boy worker who was operating the cords saw the flames, he fled the building. The flames rose up the scenery and spread in the fly gallery from one hanging scene to the other; there were 35 such hanging scenes which could be lowered. The scenes were painted with oil paints on hemp canvas. In addition to the hangings were also the borders that provided the outlines of buildings and skies, among other set pieces; these, too, caught fire sequentially. Pine planks (with shingles over them) fixed over rafters with no plastering and ceiling spread the flames, which fell from the ceiling and spread extremely rapidly. The impact of the fire was worsened because the stage curtain hid the initial flames from the audience.

There were three types of seating available to the audience. Most of the audience sat on wooden benches, for which they paid a dollar. The gallery seating mentioned above was available for 25 cents. Each had their own exits, whereas the more exclusive boxes on the sides were only accessible by a single narrow, winding staircase and a maze of hallways. Fire damage and the weight of people crowding on the staircase led it to collapse, and one observer assumed that all who were on the staircase at the time perished due to smoke inhalation. Another observer posited that, had the people in the lower boxes jumped down to the floor, the people in the upper boxes would have had space to escape, and all might have been saved. However, the sense of panic in the room was opined to have prevented this; indeed, some people remained in their seats out of fear and perished.

In the panic of the fire, many people were pushed and fell, and they were unable to escape. Many people in the boxes jumped out of the windows of the theatre. Others who were assembled near the window were afraid to do so.

=== Rescue attempts ===
The editor of the Richmond Standard, present at the scene, urged people to jump; he, with help from many others on the ground, then heroically saved the lives of many of those who chose to do so.

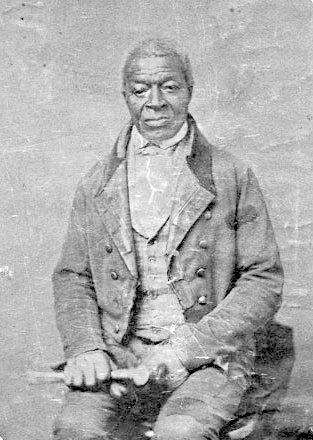
Gilbert Hunt, who helped save numerous lives on the night of the fire, became the subject of a biography published to provide an income for him during his old age

Also credited with heroism was Gilbert Hunt, a former slave who, having purchased his freedom, was working as a blacksmith at a shop near the theatre. Along with Dr. James McCaw, a physician who was attending the theatre that evening, Hunt was credited with saving close to a dozen people. McCaw would lower them from the burning second story, and Hunt would catch them. Hunt also saved McCaw, who jumped just as a burning section of wall was about to fall on him. Today Hunt is memorialized by a historical marker on the site. A book, entitled Gilbert Hunt, the City Blacksmith, later was published in his honor and to provide financial assistance for him in his old age.

It has been claimed that Revolutionary War hero Peter Francisco saved over thirty people from the theater during the fire, having been in attendance at the performance.

=== Victims ===
Of the 72 who died in the fire, 54 were women and 18 were men. Among the victims were Virginia's sitting governor, George William Smith, and former U.S. Senator Abraham B. Venable; the governor had purportedly tried to save his child from the flames. Also killed were Benjamin Botts, of Dumfries, and his wife; Botts had made a name for himself as a member of the defense in Aaron Burr's 1807 trial for treason. Their son, John Botts, became a U.S. congressman and prominent unionist during the American Civil War.

Dr. Robert Greenhow, son of Robert Greenhow and later the husband of noted Confederate spy Rose Greenhow, survived the fire along with his father; his mother was killed in the blaze. Another survivor was former U.S. Congressman John G. Jackson, then serving in the Virginia General Assembly.

George Tucker, who became the University of Virginia's first Professor of Moral Philosophy, narrowly escaped with his life after being struck in the head by a timber which left a permanent scar. In his autobiography, Tucker claimed to have saved several women from the conflagration. Sarah Henry Campbell, daughter of Founding Father Patrick Henry, was rescued from the flames by Alexander Scott, and later became his wife.

Many members of the upper echelons of Richmond society were in attendance on the night of the fire, and many were killed; among the dead were listed Pages, Nelsons, and Braxtons, all members of some of the First Families of Virginia.

== Aftermath ==
On December 27, 1811, the Common Council commissioned a Committee of Investigation, which absolved the Placide & Green Theater Company of responsibility and blamed the inferior design and construction of the theater building for the great loss of life.

=== Monumental Church ===
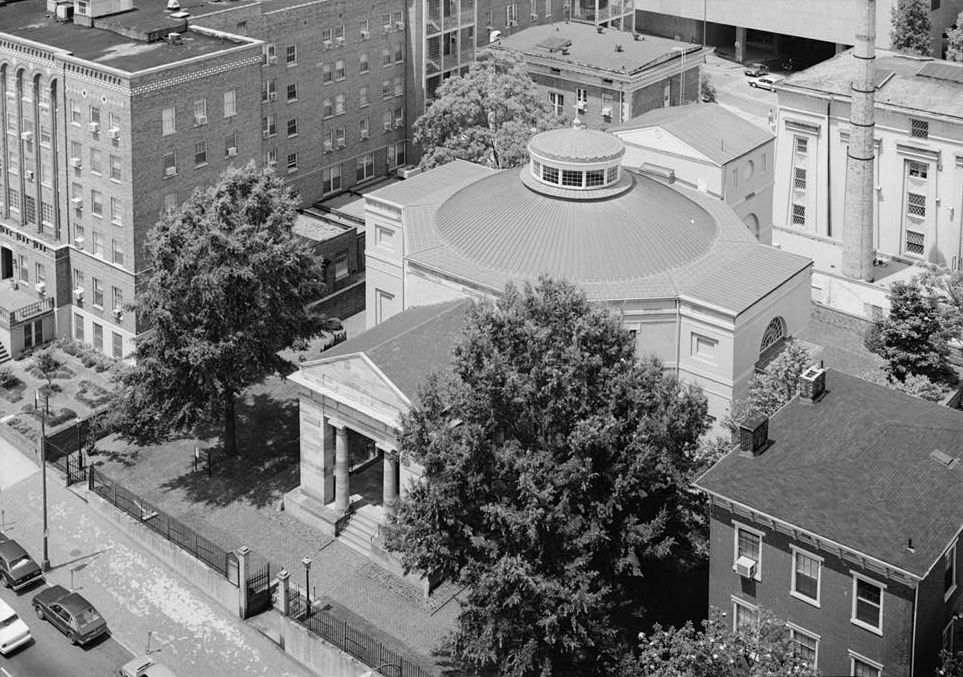
Monumental Church was built on the site of the destroyed theatre to commemorate the victims of the fire

The ordinance for building a monument for the victims was further modified by a resolution of the Richmond City Council to erect a church at the site, as a further commemoration of the victims of the fire. City Council also sanctioned an amount of US$5,000 as its contribution toward the building of the church by the "Association for building a church on Shockoe Hill". Thus the Monumental Church was built on the Richmond Theatre site between 1812 and 1814 to commemorate those who had died from the fire. The Episcopal church, commissioned by U.S. Chief Justice John Marshall, was designed by architect Robert Mills, the only pupil of Thomas Jefferson; Mills was also the architect of the Washington Monument and White House of the Confederacy. Mills "had a reputation for being particularly concerned with fireproofing," probably owing to his work on Monumental, and later in his career designed Charleston's Fireproof Building as a testament to that fact. The church was built in an octagonal shape.

The marble monument in the form of an urn erected at the church contains the names of 72 victims of the fire, inscribed on its four cardinal faces. The monument is enclosed within a wire fence. It is located in the central yard of the memorial church, in the middle of the church's front or main portico. The remains of the dead lie in a crypt below the portico. On the monument, the names of the male victims face Broad Street, and the female victims' names appear on the remaining three sides. Six of the known victims were black, including at least one slave. Their six names are carved below the names of the sixty-six white victims on the monument's base. Although the monument lists only 72 victims, at least 76 were known to have died in the blaze or in the days immediately following the disaster.

Monumental Church established the first Sunday School program in Richmond on November 20, 1817. Famous parishioners included Chief Justice John Marshall, whose family occupied pew No. 23; Edgar Allan Poe, whose foster parents, the Allans, were members and occupied pew No. 80; the Marquis de Lafayette when he visited Richmond in 1824; William Mayo of Powhatan; and the Chamberlayne family. Three Richmond congregations were formed from Monumental, including: St. James's in 1831, St. Paul's in 1845 and All Saints in 1888. Deconsecrated in 1965, it was given by the Medical College of Virginia to the Historic Richmond Foundation, an affiliate of the Association for the Preservation of Virginia Antiquities.

In 2004, Monumental Church underwent a significant renovation, although the bodies of the victims are still in a brick crypt below the church. During the renovation, the original monument to the 72 people killed in the fire was replaced by an exact replica. The documentary Saving Grace-Resurrecting American History follows the process of using laser scanning to recreate the monument in computers, then sending the data to Ireland, where stonecutters used both high technology computer equipment and old-fashioned stone-cutting tools to create a new 7,000 pound monument.

In 2006, regular tours began, in cooperation with the Valentine Richmond History Center's Court End Passport. The building is open on occasion for other private functions.

=== Another Richmond Theatre ===
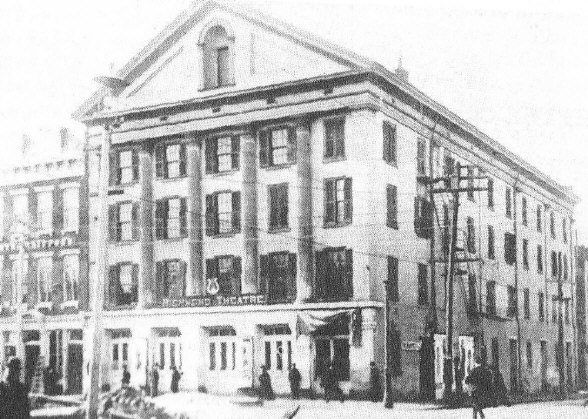
New Richmond Theatre, as photographed in 1858

A new theater, the third to be known as the Richmond Theatre, was built in Richmond in 1819, at a cost of US $40,000. It was built of brick at the corner of H and Seventh Street with a well-equipped stage and popular motif ornamentation. Within view of the site of the fire at the original theater, the builders of the new theater made specific mention in their publicity of the fact that the building had adequate doors for people to escape, in case of any emergency situation.

== In literature ==
Lydia Sigourney gives an account of the disaster in her poem The Anniversary of the Destruction of the Richmond Theatre., published in her first volume of poetry in 1815.

The 2023 historical fiction The House is on Fire by Rachel Beanland depicts the Richmond Theatre Fire and its aftermath.
