= Robert Greenhow =

American politician (1761–1840)

Personal details
- Born: May 11, 1761 Williamsburg, Virginia, U.S.
- Died: June 30, 1840 (aged 79) Washington City, U.S.
- Spouse: Mary Ann Wills
- Children: 1
- Occupation: Politician

Robert Greenhow (May 11, 1761 – June 30, 1840) was an American politician from Virginia. He served as mayor of Williamsburg and as mayor of Richmond in 1813. He also represented James City County in the Virginia House of Delegates.

== Early life ==
Robert Greenhow was born on May 11, 1761, in Williamsburg, Virginia, to Judith (née Davenport) and John Greenhow. His father was a merchant. His father later married Elizabeth Tyler, sister of John Tyler.

== Career ==
Born to a wealthy family, Greenhow had a substitute in his place during the American Revolutionary War He served in a junior company during the Revolutionary War. He helped protect Williamsburg and the banks of the James River.

Greenhow served as mayor of Williamsburg and he represented James City County in the Virginia House of Delegates. In 1810, he moved to Richmond. In 1811, he was appointed as a commissioner to supervise the building of the new Governor's mansion in Richmond. He served as Richmond's mayor in 1813 during the War of 1812.

Greenhow was an organizer of the Virginia Bible Society.

== Personal life ==
Greenhow married Mary Ann Wills. He lost his wife in the Richmond Theatre fire in 1811. He and his son Robert Jr. were survivors of the fire. His son Robert married Rose O'Neal.

Greenhow was a member of the Episcopal Church for more than 50 years. He was the first warden of the rebuilt Monumental Church in 1814. He died at the home of his son in Washington City on June 30, 1840.
