= Monumental Church =

Former Episcopal church and national landmark in Richmond, Virginia, United States

- U.S. National Register of Historic Places
- U.S. National Historic Landmark
- Virginia Landmarks Register
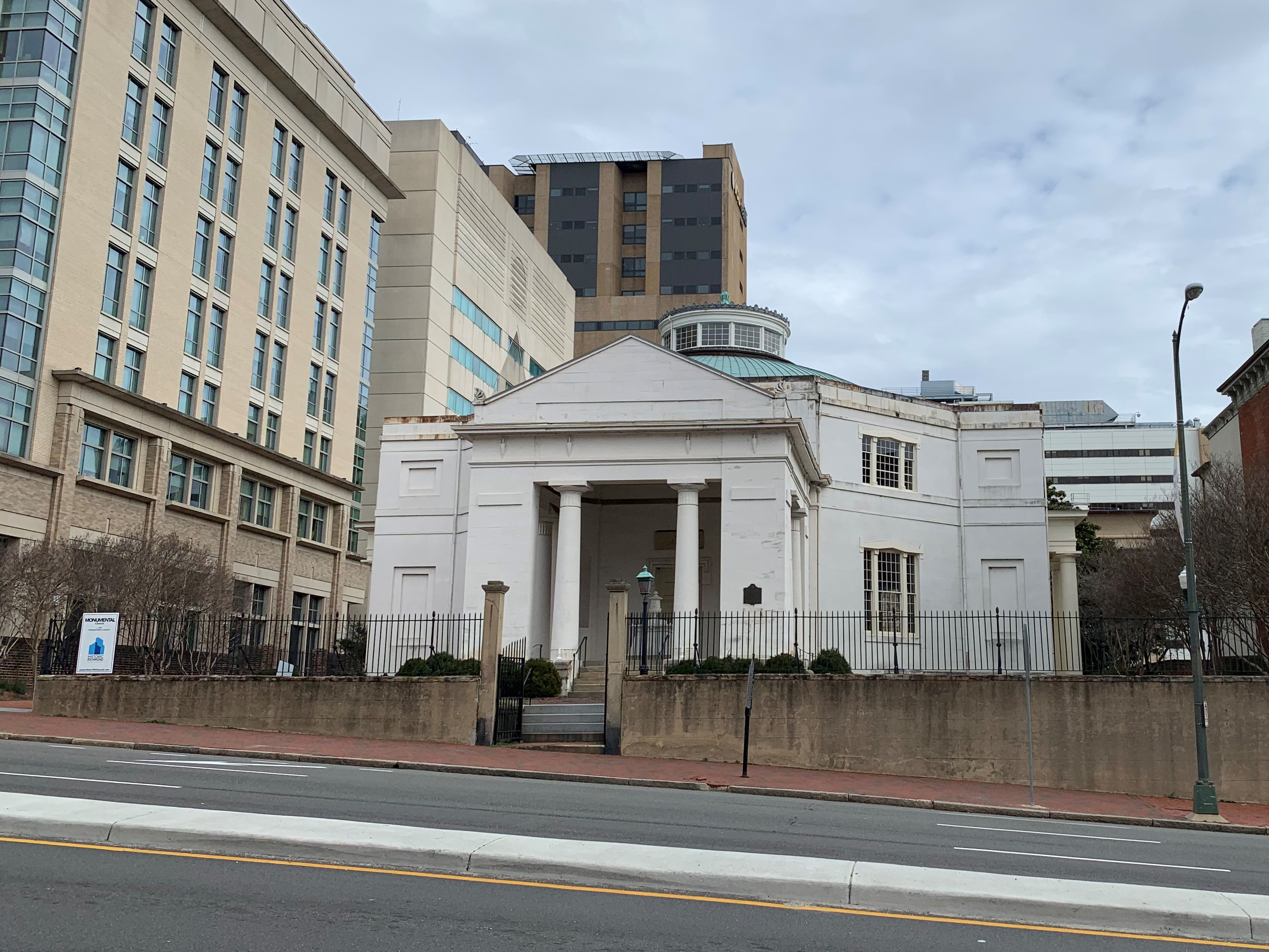
- Monumental Church, 2019

- Location within Virginia Location within the United States
- Location: 1224 E. Broad St., Richmond, Virginia
- Coordinates: 37°32′20″N 77°25′48″W
- Built: 1812–1814
- Architect: Robert Mills
- Architectural style: Greek Revival
- NRHP reference No.: 69000326
- VLR No.: 127-0012

Significant dates
- Added to NRHP: April 16, 1969
- Designated NHL: November 11, 1971
- Designated VLR: November 5, 1968

Monumental Church is a former Episcopal church at 1224 E. Broad Street between N. 12th and College streets in Richmond, Virginia. Designed by architect Robert Mills, it is one of America's earliest and most distinctive Greek Revival churches. It is listed on the National Register of Historic Places, has been designated as a National Historic Landmark and is located in the Court End historic district.

Monumental Church was built between 1812 and 1814 to commemorate the 72 people who died on the site in the December 26, 1811, Richmond Theatre fire. The building consists of two parts: a crypt and a church. The crypt is located beneath the sanctuary and contains the remains of those who died in the fire. The church is octagonal in form; its walls are constructed with brick faced with Aquia Creek sandstone and a stucco finish.

== History ==
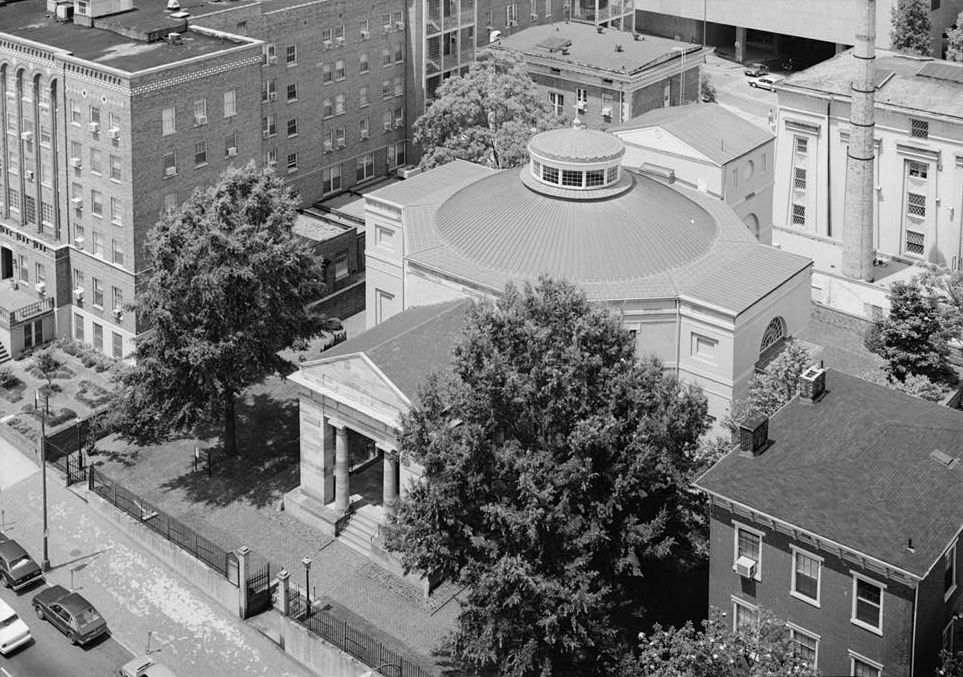
An aerial view of Monumental Church circa 1973. The Egyptian Building is just behind it. The Nursing Education building was demolished by MCV-VCU.

This site was developed for the first Academy of Fine Arts and Sciences in America, or "The Theatre Square." Chevalier Quesnay de Beaurepaire, a French officer in the Revolutionary army, had developed the idea for the academy but the plan was abandoned due to the war. In 1786 Richmond's first theatre was built on this site, described as having the appearance of a "barn-like building."

The Virginia Ratifying Convention of 1788 was held in this building beginning on June 3 for three weeks "after first convening in the temporary capitol at Cary and Fourteenth streets." Among the many individuals in attendance were James Madison, John Marshall, James Monroe, Edmund Pendleton, George Wythe, George Nicholas, Edmund Randolph, George Mason, Richard Henry Lee and Patrick Henry.

This building was destroyed by fire in 1802 and the Richmond Theatre replaced it. In 1811, the Richmond Theatre fire resulted in the deaths of 72 people. Chief Justice John Marshall commissioned a church to replace it as a monument, and it was designed by architect Robert Mills, the first American-born architect. He was the architect of the Washington Monuments in both Baltimore and Washington, DC. He also later designed many buildings in South Carolina as superintendent of public buildings. Mills "had a reputation for being particularly concerned with fireproofing." Later he designed Charleston's Fireproof Building.

On Nov. 20, 1817, Monumental Church established the first Sunday School program in Richmond. Famous parishioners included Chief Justice John Marshall, whose family occupied pew No. 23; Edgar Allan Poe, whose foster parents the Allans were members and occupied pew No. 80; the Marquis de Lafayette when he visited Richmond in 1824, William Mayo of Powhatan, and the Chamberlayne family.

Three Richmond congregations were formed from Monumental, including: St. James's in 1831, St. Paul's in 1845, and All Saints in 1888. As the center of population in the city dispersed to the suburbs, Monumental Church was judged too costly to operate. It was deconsecrated in 1965 and taken over by the Medical College of Virginia for classroom space. The College transferred the building to the Historic Richmond Foundation, an affiliate of the Association for the Preservation of Virginia Antiquities.

== Architecture ==
The design of the Monumental Church generated a certain amount of controversy between the two architects, Benjamin Henry Latrobe and Robert Mills, who were consulted independently by the Committee. Latrobe had submitted his designs initially and believed that his plan was approved by the Committee. However, the Committee approved the plan submitted by Robert Mills, which combined the monument with the church. This resulted in an awkward situation, as Mills had worked as Latrobe's assistant earlier in his career.

Latrobe refused to submit any alternate plan when requested by the Committee, as he felt slighted. However, he commended their decision and wrote glowingly of the Mills's capability to fulfill the assignment.

Following this, additional letters were exchanged between Latrobe and Mills, which were not very cordial at times. Latrobe's last letter of July 22, 1812 addressed to Mills ended the controversy.

Mill's plan consisted of "an emphatic 'monumental porch'"—thirty-two feet square as Latrobe had proposed—grafted onto an auditorium-style church. The porch, which Mills called the "vestibule, dominates the south elevation, and fronts upon the street. The body of the church is an octagon, one facet of which abuts the rear of the monumental porch. Within the church, directly across from the doorway, the pulpit stands within an acoustically conceived apse, which balances the porch. This bay projects from the northern face of the octagon and was intended to serve as the base of the steeple (never executed). To the east and west project corresponding bays; these contain stairways to the balcony that circumscribes the interior, except the pulpit apse on the north face of the nave. A low saucer dome caps the nave, and its center is pierced by a round monitor or cupola." The monumental porch adopted "shadow, void and contrasting forms" to register a lasting impression. The design also adopted large forms with least ornamentation with the brown colour of the Aquia stone sandstone accentuating the solemnity of the structure. The placement of the large piers in the porch brought about a shaded interior. The Doric columns with fluted drums also projected out into the light. The overall effect of the porch was of a geometrically proportioned and balanced structure.

The design has not been universally lauded, in a 1939 review of Protestant church design in America, Architectural Record described it as "Greek Revival runs afoul of the Renaissance dome tradition, with serious compromises in both the plan and the fenestration."

== Present use ==
In 2004 Monumental Church underwent a significant renovation. A monument to the 72 people killed in the fire was replaced by an exact replica. The bodies of the victims remain in a brick crypt below the church.

The documentary Saving Grace-Resurrecting American History, written and directed by writer/director Eric Futterman, follows the process of recreating the monument. Laser scanners were used to record its measurements. The data was sent by Internet to Ireland, where stonecutters used both high-tech computer equipment and old-fashioned stone-cutting created a new 7,000-pound monument.

In 2006, regular tours began. These are operated in cooperation with the Valentine Richmond History Center's "Court End Passport". The building is open on occasion for other private functions.

== See also ==
- List of National Historic Landmarks in Virginia
- National Register of Historic Places listings in Richmond, Virginia
