= Emma Waller =

English-American actress (1815–1899)

- Spouses: Robert Fullerton (married 1839 -1850); Daniel Waller Wilmarth (married 1851)
- Relatives: William (father); Sarah (mother); Jemima Thomasina (sister); Sarah (sister); William (brother)

Emma Waller (1815 – 28 February 1899) was an English actress who achieved fame in America.

Baptised Emma Weeden, January 1815 at St George Hanover Square, London, England, a daughter of William and Sarah Weeden. The Weeden family included Emma's brother William, and her two sisters Jemima Thomasina and Sarah. Their father was groom and stable master for Other Windsor, 6th Earl of Plymouth. They grew up on the Windsor estates in Leicester and Tardebigge, Worcester, receiving a good education and becoming proficient with horses.

Following the death of The Earl of Plymouth in 1833, the Weeden's returned to London where William became the proprietor of a fast coach service between London and Brighton.

Emma Weeden married Robert Fullerton at Brighton on 2 February 1839, at which time she was already describing herself as a "Proprietor of Music". Her husband died and on 6 December 1850. Emma had a son to a visiting American Theatrical actor who went by the stage name Daniel Waller. His real name was Daniel Waller Wilmarth. Their son was named Henry Tuthill Waller Wilmarth. Emma had been pursuing her music career under the stage name "Miss Eardley" (her mother's maiden name). A favorable review appears in the Berkshire Chronicle of 24 November 1849. She soon progressed to being a regular performer at Madame Vestris’ Royal Lyceum Theatre in London. The Lyceum was known for extravaganzas featuring the peculiarities of burlesque and something of the pantomime, mixed up with a dash of seriousness, and not a little satirical humour.

Emma and Daniel married on 29 April 1851 in St Marks, Old Street, Middlesex.

Daniel and Emma Waller travelled to the United States in 1851. Daniel played Hamlet and other tragic roles in New York soon after their arrival. Emma's American stage début was as lead in a grand concert at the Jenny Lind Theatre, San Francisco, on 6 May 1852. She was received well and became a popular performer. For much of 1852 The Waller Troupe, which included a young Edwin Booth, toured the northern Californian mining towns on horseback. They sailed thence for Australia, where at Melbourne Mrs. Waller acted Lady Macbeth. Returning to London, Mrs. Waller made her début at the Drury Lane on 15 September 1856, as Pauline in Bulwer-Lytton's The Lady of Lyons. In the diaries of E. L. Blanchard he notes that "as Pauline—she lacked vigour, but was gentle and graceful" (Scott and Howard, post, I, 164). If his judgment is correct, she must have grown appreciably in physical and intellectual intensity, for she became one of the leading emotional actresses on the American stage.

Towards the end of 1857 the Wallers returned to the United States, where they thereafter remained. Mrs. Waller made her début at the Walnut Street Theatre in Philadelphia on 19 October 1857, as Ophelia to the Hamlet of Mr. Waller. On the second and third nights of that engagement she acted successively Pauline and Lady Macbeth. She was described as "of stately presence, neither slender nor stout in person, and had an interesting and expressive face" (New York Dramatic Mirror, post, p. 17). The same spectator adds that she acted Lady Macbeth with an "intensity of . . . passion" that was "almost painful." Her first appearance in New York was on 5 April 1858, as Marina to her husband's Ferdinand in a new version of John Webster's tragedy, The Duchess of Malfi.

Thereafter she starred for some twenty years throughout the country, often with Mr. Waller as her principal associate. Among her most conspicuous characters being Queen Margaret in Richard III and Queen Katharine in Henry VIII (both in support of Edwin Booth), Meg Merrilies in Guy Mannering, Nelly Brady in Edmund Falconer's The Peep O’Day, and Julia in Sheridan Knowles's The Hunchback. Though Mrs. Waller was accused of imitating the Meg Merrilies of Charlotte Cushman, she had never seen her in the part, and her Meg was an original assumption of that character. "The weird dignity of her bearing," wrote William Winter, "was impressive beyond words; there were moments, indeed, when she seemed to be a soul inspired by communion with beings of another world" (post, p. 196). She was also one of a number of actresses who seemed to take pleasure in impersonating male Shakespearean characters, among the most noteworthy of these being her interpretations of Hamlet and Iago. She closed her career as an actress in 1878 as Hester Stanhope in a modern play entitled An Open Verdict. Afterwards, like many other actors and actresses, she gave public readings from Shakespeare and other dramatists, her last noteworthy public appearance being made at Chickering Hall in New York on 1 December 1881.

Mr. Waller died in 1882 and for some years thereafter she taught elocution in New York. Ill health finally compelled her to abandon all active professional work, and she lived in complete retirement at the home of her son in New York, where she died.
