= Sallie Partington =

American Civil War era actress

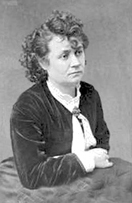
- Born: May 1834; Islington, England
- Died: January 10, 1907 (aged 72); Richmond, Virginia, U.S.
- Resting place: Hollywood Cemetery
- Occupation: Actress

Sallie (Sally) Partington (May 1834 – January 10, 1907) was an American Civil War era actress born in May 1834 at No. 28 High Street, Islington, England. She worked with many famous actors of the era, including John Wilkes Booth. During the American Civil War she was considered "the toast of Richmond" and was a great source of inspiration and encouragement to Confederate soldiers, ending many of her stage performances with a salute to the Confederacy. Partington was also well known for her performance in the popular Confederate play the Virginia Cavalier in which she performed the song "Southern Soldier Boy", written by Confederate Captain G. W. Alexander.

== Early life ==
Sallie's family, consisting of her father, John Partington, who was a confectioner, her mother, Martha Partington, and her older sister, Mary, arrived in New York City when Sallie was very young. The family soon moved to Richmond, Virginia, where Sallie and her three sisters, Mary, Katie and Jennie, performed at the old Marshall Theatre in Richmond in a variety of plays, including many Shakespearean plays and, later, as Topsy in Uncle Tom's Cabin. Except for her theatrical travels, Sally remained in Richmond for the rest of her life.

== Conspiracy theory ==
Sallie was one of those southerners who believed that John Wilkes Booth was never captured. She claimed to have personally seen a letter written by Booth to her good friend, Clementine DeBarr, which proved that Booth was alive. DeBarr was the second wife of Booth's brother, Junius Brutus Booth Jr. According to the letter, Junius helped his brother escape to Australia, which, coincidentally, also happened to be the childhood home of Junius's first wife, Marian Agnes Land Rookes, who had been born in Sydney, New South Wales, Australia. The letter said that immediately after the assassination of Abraham Lincoln, Booth escaped to Australia by pawning a diamond ring to a sea captain who then arranged passage for the fugitive in a three-masted schooner. Booth ended the letter by describing his life in Australia as "peaceful".

Sally Partington claimed that her friend was "...in constant communication with Booth" long after his supposed "death" on April 26, 1865, and that the letters proved that Booth had, indeed, escaped to Australia where he lived out the remainder of his life.

== Death ==
Sallie Partington died in Richmond, Virginia, on January 10, 1907. At the time of her death she was living at 1111 Graham Street with her nephew, Milton Edward Barnes, and his family. Partington had raised Barnes after the death of her sister, Jennie Partington Barnes. Barnes's eldest daughter, also named Jennie, was the grandmother of Gail Hutchins Mewes, a member of the Daughters of the American Revolution and the contributor of this article. Mewes recalls that her grandmother remembered her famous aunt fondly and would often recount the stories her aunt had told her about being an actress during the Civil War and about her encounters with the mysterious, flirtatious, John Wilkes Booth. Sallie Partington is buried in Hollywood Cemetery in Richmond along with her mother, her sisters, her brother (who served in the Confederacy) and many famous Confederate soldiers.
