= The Iron Chest =

1796 play

- 1845 edition
- Original language: English
- Written by: George Colman the Younger
- Genre: Drama
- Setting: Hampshire, England

Premiere
- Date: 12 March 1796
- Place: Theatre Royal, Drury Lane, London

The Iron Chest is a 1796 play by the British writer George Colman the Younger after the novel Things as They Are by William Godwin. Incidental music was composed by Stephen Storace. The play premiered at the Theatre Royal, Drury Lane in London on 12 March 1796.

== Cast ==
The original cast included John Philip Kemble as Sir Edward Mortimer, Richard Wroughton as Fitzharding, John Bannister as Wilford, James William Dodd as Adam Winterton, William Barrymore as Rawbold, Richard Suett as Samson Rawbold, Robert Palmer as Orson, Charles Bannister as Third Robert, Elizabeth Farren as Lady Helen, Maria Gibbs as Blanch, Charlotte Tidswell as Dame Rawbold, Nancy Storace as Barbara and Maria Theresa Kemble as Judith. The Irish premiere took place at the Crow Street Theatre in Dublin on 6 March 1797.

== Plot ==
The Iron Chest is a melodrama. The villain is Sir Edward Mortimer, a head-keeper of the New Forest, who has been acquitted on a charge of murder some years previously. The secret of his guilt is learnt by Wilford, the hero, who is consequently hounded by Mortimer and is accused of robbery. In an old iron chest the documentary evidence of Mortimer's guilt is discovered.

== Bibliography ==
- Greene, John C. Theatre in Dublin, 1745-1820: A Calendar of Performances, Volume 6. Lexington Books, 2011.
- Nicoll, Allardyce. A History of English Drama 1660–1900: Volume III. Cambridge University Press, 2009.
- Hogan, C.B (ed.) The London Stage, 1660–1800: Volume V. Southern Illinois University Press, 1968.
