= The Gamester (Moore) =

1753 play by Edward Moore

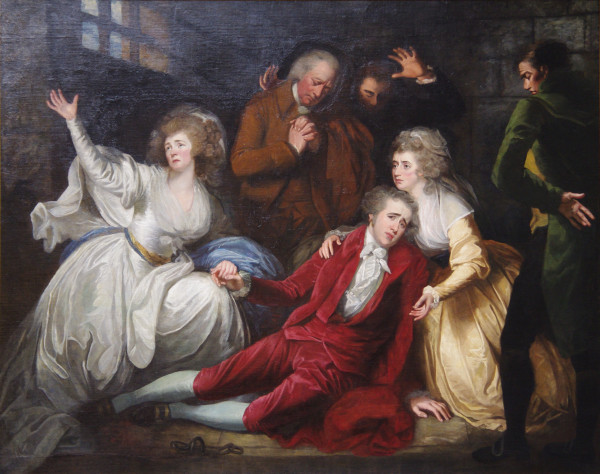
The Gamester by Mather Brown (1787). Actors are Alexander Pope, Elizabeth Younge, Mary Wells, William Farren the Elder, Thomas Hull and George Inchbald.

The Gamester is a drama in five acts by dramatist Edward Moore. It premiered at the Drury Lane Theatre on February 7, 1753. The original production starred David Garrick as Beverley, Hannah Pritchard as Mrs. Beverley, Henry Mossop as Lewson, Thomas Davies as Stukely, Edward Berry as Jarvis, Charles Blakes as Dawson, Miss Charlotte as Miss. Haughton, Miss Lucy as Mrs. Price, Mr. Burton as Bates, and Ellis Ackman as the Waiter.
