= Alexandre-Marie Quesnay de Beaurepaire =

- Born: November 26, 1755
- Relatives: François Quesnay
- Military career
- Conflicts: American Revolutionary War

Alexandre-Marie Quesnay de Beaurepaire (1755–1820) was the grandson of French philosopher and economist, François Quesnay, and was among the idealistic French contingency who joined in the American struggle for independence during the late 18th century.

Quesnay de Beaurepaire is best known for occupying several positions: a captain in the Royal Guards of Louis XVI, French captain (with residence in Virginia) in the American Revolutionary War Army (April 1777 – 1778) and co-patron, alongside Thomas Jefferson, of the short-lived Academy of Fine Arts and Sciences of the United States in Richmond, Virginia. During his time in the United States he lived variously in Gloucester County, Virginia; Philadelphia; New York City; and Richmond, Virginia. He returned to France in 1786 and continued to enlist vast support for the academy. With the fall of the Bastille, and the coming of the French revolution, his efforts to create a French/American academy were permanently ended.
