= Female impersonation =

Entertainment by a man dressed as a woman

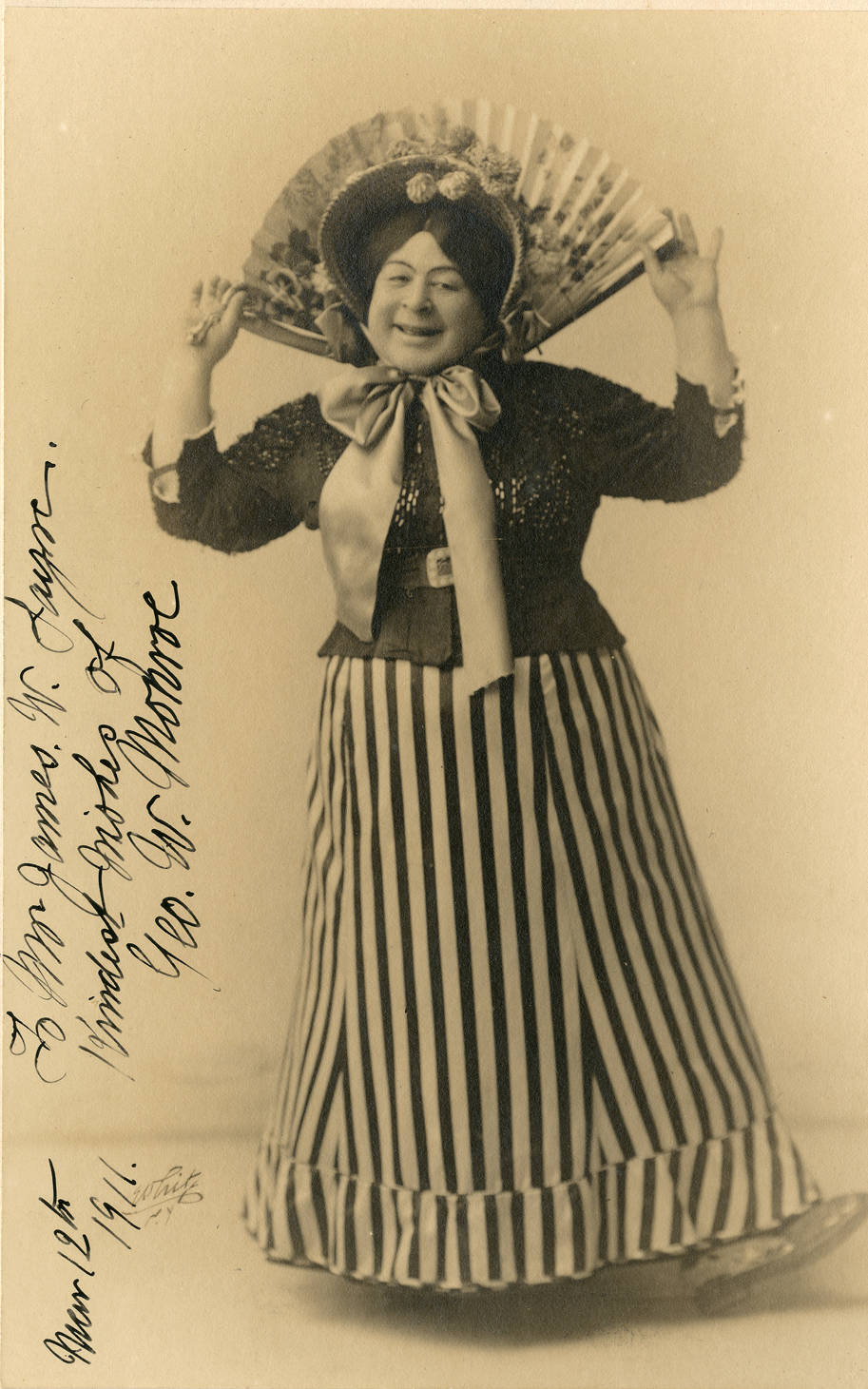
George W. Munroe (1911)

Female impersonation is a type of theatrical performance where a man dresses in women's clothing for the only purpose of entertaining an audience. While the term female impersonator is sometimes used interchangeably with drag queen, they are not the same. Drag as an art form is associated with queer identity whereas female impersonation may come from a wide a range of gender identity paradigms, including heteronormativity. Additionally, many drag artists view drag as a lived form of self-expression or creativity, and perceive drag as something that is not limited to the stage or to performance. In contrast, female impersonation is specifically limited to performance and may or may not involve an LGBTQ point of view.

== History of female impersonation ==
=== Ancient Greece ===
The concept of drag can be seen in the earliest forms of entertainment, including Ancient Greek theatre. In ancient western cultures, women often were not allowed to perform onstage or become actors, therefore male actors played the roles of women also. This demonstrates how female impersonation can be traced back to the earliest forms of entertainment and spectacle. Not only this, but men and boys were expected to dress as women, or in drag, for many religious ceremonies and rituals in Ancient Greece.

There is some controversy as to whether this is actually where drag emerged, or if it occurred later in history, in the 19th century with forms of entertainment such as minstrel shows and Shakespeare's plays, as he often incorporated male actors as female impersonators.

=== United States ===
==== Minstrel shows ====
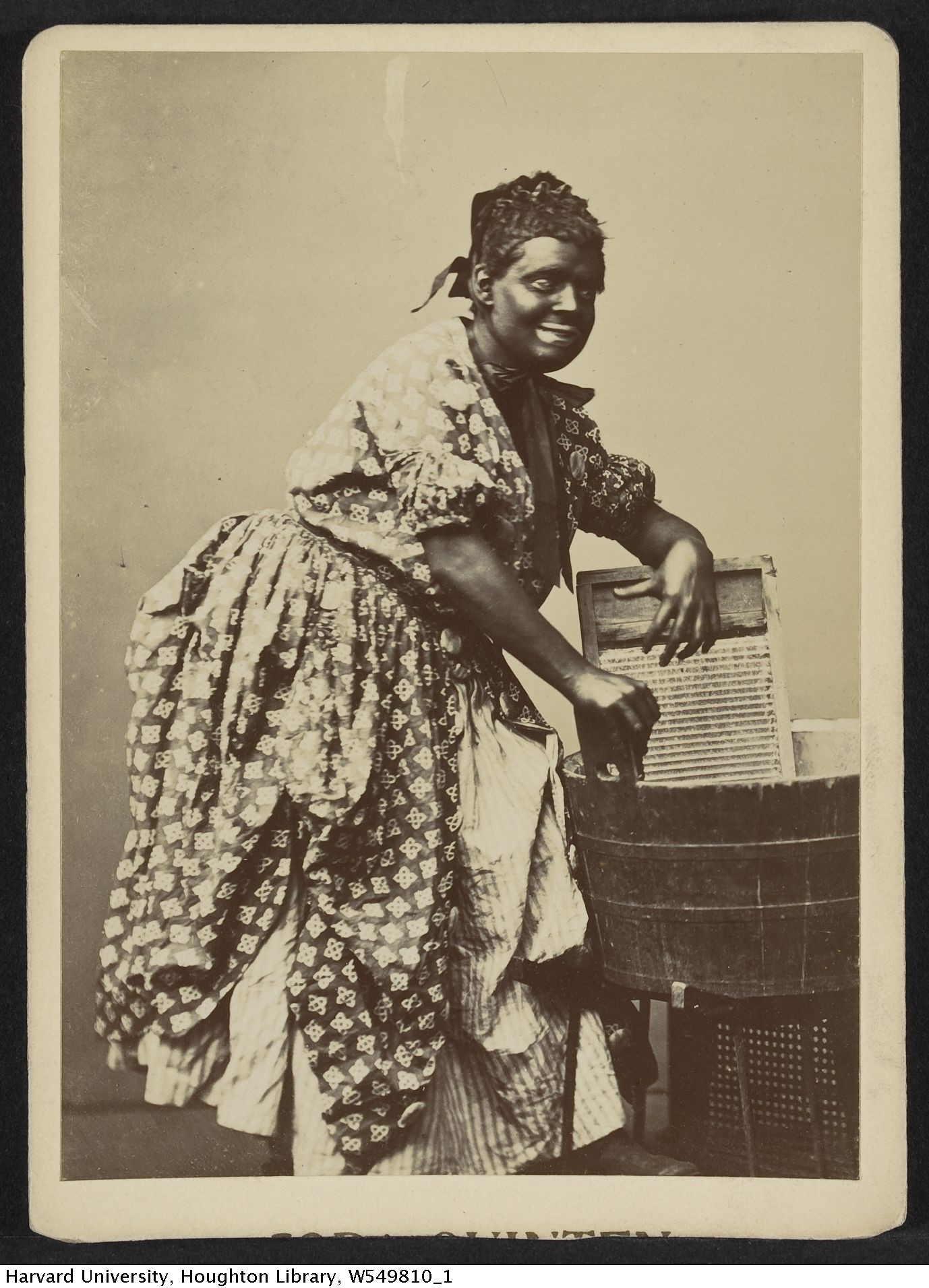
Samuel S. Sanford, a blackface female impersonator in Sanford's Opera Troupe.

The evolution of female impersonation and drag in the United States was influenced by minstrel shows. The term female impersonator was in wide use during the 19th century in theater in the United States to refer to a specific type of performer in minstrel shows and later vaudeville known as "wench" and "dame" roles. These roles were performed by both cisgender heterosexual men, and by queer men who were closeted and in some rare cases openly non-heterosexual. The actor Thomas L. Moxley was a celebrated blackface female impersonator who performed under the name Master Floyd in George Kunkel's Nightingales; a leading minstrel show of the 1850s and 1860s.

These shows were an example of how Blackface was used in a racist form of entertainment where the performers would mock African American men, but as time went on they found it amusing to mock African American women as well. They performed in comedic skits, dances, and "wench" songs. Black people themselves were largely excluded from being performers as at this point in history. Blackface in minstrel shows emerged in c. 1820, but became more established with the creation of the character of Jim Crow, which was first performed in 1828. After the Civil War, performance troupes began to be composed of Black performers. The shows maintained popularity in American entertainment into the 1920s.

In the 19th century and early 20th century minstrel show female impersonators did not attempt to present the illusion of femininity, but rather lampooned cisgender women through a comic representation of women that did not attempt to completely remove the actor's masculine physical traits. Minstrel show female impersonators often employed sexist and racist stereotypes within bawdy humor to make fun of women, often black women, in blackface. This type of humor continued on the vaudeville and burlesque stage.

==== Vaudeville and 20th century female impersonators ====
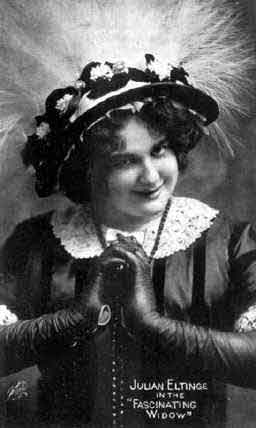
Julian Eltinge as a female impersonator in the Fascinating Widow, early 1910s

The broad comedic stylings of the minstrel shows helped develop the vaudeville shows of the late 1800s to the early 1900s. In addition to the "wench players", minstrel shows developed the role of "prima donnas", who appeared more elegant and refined while still retaining their comedic elements. While the "wenches" were purely American creations, the "prima donnas" were inspired by both American and European cross-dressing shows, like Shakespearean actors and castrati. With the United States shifting demographics, including the shift from farms to cities, Great Migration of African Americans, and an influx of immigrants, vaudeville's broad comedy and music expanded the audience from minstrelsy. Near the end of the 19th century a new type of female impersonation, the female illusionist, began to appear in vaudeville. This type of performer did not use humor to denigrate women, but rather attempted to celebrate women by presenting a realistic looking woman in tasteful fashions of the period.

With vaudeville becoming more popular, it allowed female impersonators to become popular as well. Many female impersonators started with low comedy in vaudeville and worked their way up to perform as the prima donna. They were known to perform song and dance routines with multiple outfit changes. George W. Munroe, who was known for portraying gossipy old Irish women, started in vaudeville in the late 19th century, and became a Broadway star; portraying the title role in the musical The Doings of Mrs. Dooley at the Grand Opera House in 1902. Other vaudeville female impersonators included Gilbert Sarony as his female character Giddy Gusher, Neil Burgess as the Widow Bedotte, and the Russell Brothers who portrayed Irish maids.

In New York City, famous female impersonator Julian Eltinge found success, and he eventually made his way to the Broadway stage performing as a woman. He published a magazine, Magazine and Beauty Hints (1913), which provided beauty and fashion tips, and he posed for corset and cosmetics advertisements. Meanwhile, in San Francisco, Bothwell Browne was the top female impersonator of the West Coast. He performed at the Grand Opera House and Central Theater, among other venues, went on tour with United Vaudeville, and later appeared in the film Yankee Doodle in Berlin (1919), produced by Mack Sennett.

At this time being a female impersonator was seen as something for the straight white male, and any deviation was punished. However, African-American comedian Andrew Tribble found success as a female impersonator on Broadway and in Black Vaudeville. Connection with sex work and homosexuality eventually led to the decline of female impersonation during the Progressive Era. Both the minstrelsy and vaudeville eras of female impersonation led to an association with music, dance, and comedy that still lasts today.

In the twentieth century some cross-gender impersonators, both female and male, in the United States became highly successful performing artists in nightclubs and theaters. There was a concerted effort by these working female impersonators in America, to separate the art of female impersonation from queer identity with an overt representation of working female impersonators as heterosexual. Some of the performers were in fact cisgender men, but others were closeted due to the politics and social environment of the period. It was criminal in many American cities to be homosexual, or for LGBTQ people to congregate, and it was therefore necessary for female impersonators to distance themselves from identifying as queer in order to avoid criminal charges. The need to hide queer identity was prevalent among female impersonators working in non-LGBTQ nightclubs before heteronormative audiences from the early 1900s to as late as the 1970s.

== See also ==
- Köçek
- Onnagata
- Otokonoko
- Travesti
