= Thomas L. Moxley =

American actor and theatre manager (c. 1828 – 1890)

Thomas L. Moxley (c. 1828, Baltimore – 7 July 1890, Baltimore) was an American actor, blackface minstrel show entertainer, and theatre manager. As a stage actor, he performed under the name Master Floyd and was an acclaimed female impersonator in minstrel shows.

== Career ==
Moxley formed a close partnership with the minstrel-show impresario, actor, and theater manager George Kunkel. They performed together for years. Moxley was a leading member of Kunkel's Nightingales, one of the most popular minstrel shows of the 1850s and 1860s, and toured widely with the troupe during this period.

In 1855, Moxley formed a theatre-management firm with Kunkel and John T. Ford, co-managing multiple theaters in Baltimore, Washington, D.C., and Richmond, Virginia. These included the National Theatre in Washington, and the Richmond Theatre (then known as the Marshall Theatre) in Virginia. John Wilkes Booth and his brother Edwin Booth both performed at the Richmond Theatre in Shakespearean performances while Moxley was there.

When Kunkel adapted Harriet Beecher Stowe's novel Uncle Tom's Cabin for the stage in 1861, Moxley portrayed the role of Topsy, a female slave. In his obituary, he was credited as the first actor to perform the role of Topsy in the theatre.

== Death ==
Moxley died of heart failure in Baltimore, Maryland, on 7 July 1890 at the age of 62.
