= Stereotypes of Irish people =

Stereotypes of Irish people include actual or imagined characteristics of Irish people used by people who view the Irish as a single and homogeneous group.

== Common stereotypes ==
=== Fighting ===
The Irish are often stereotyped as being hot-tempered and eager for physical confrontation. Boxing has a long history in Ireland, and the country has produced several Olympic gold medalist boxers, including Michael Carruth, Katie Taylor, and Kellie Harrington; and UFC champion Conor McGregor.

Ireland's reputation for violence has been referenced in several media. For example, the Irish-American ballad "Finnegan's Wake" describes a wake that devolves into a brawl, during which whiskey is accidentally spilled onto the corpse. This causes the corpse to resurrect and join the brawl. The University of Notre Dame also uses the Fighting Irish as their mascot.

=== Food ===
Stereotypical Irish foods include chicken fillet rolls, bacon, corned beef and cabbage, and potatoes.

=== Alcoholism ===
The Irish have been stereotyped as heavy drinkers for centuries.

=== Red hair ===
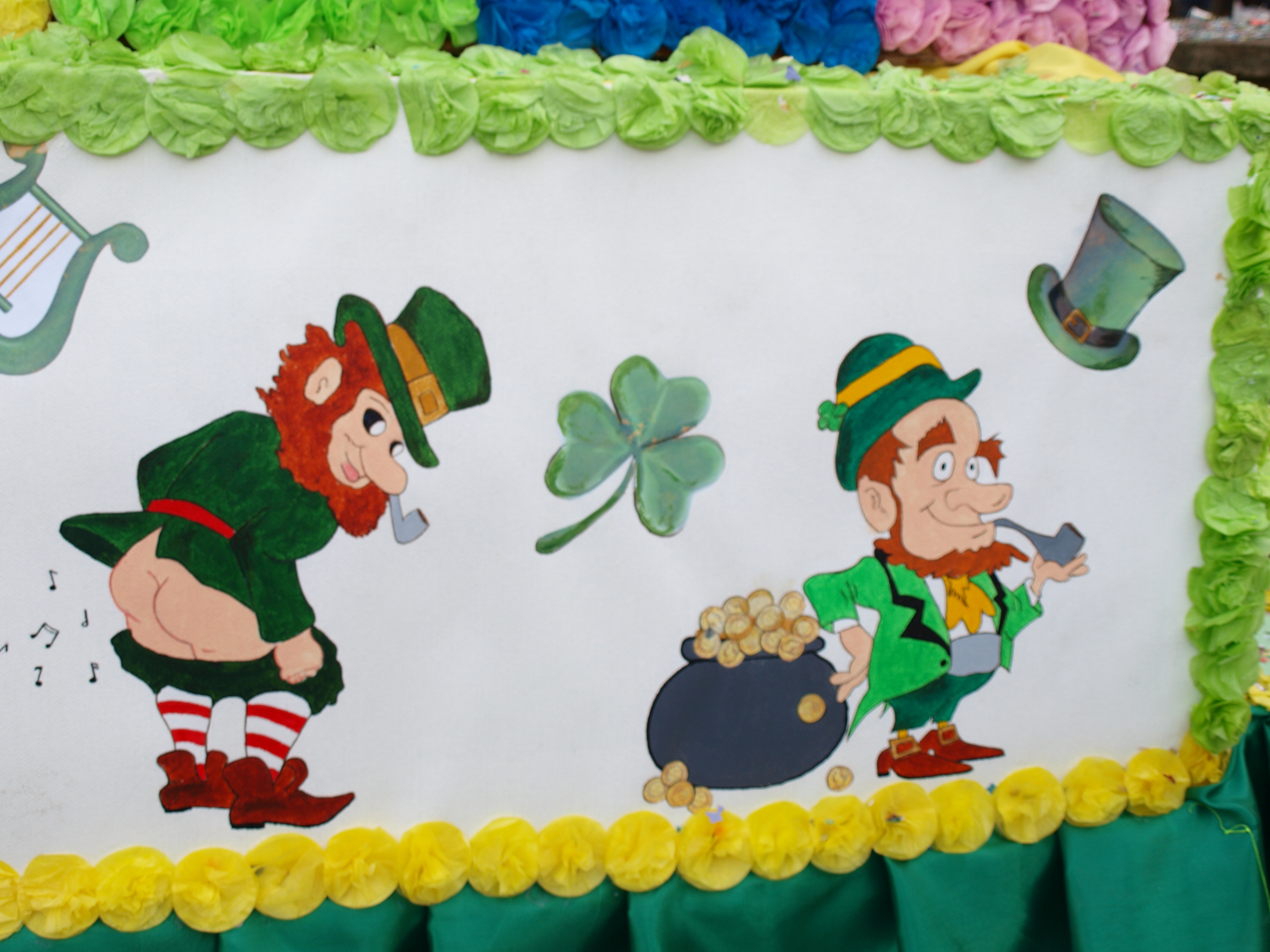
The mischievous red-headed leprechaun is an Irish stereotype.

The Irish are often stereotyped as possessing red hair. Ireland has the second highest percentage of naturally occurring red hair at 10%, behind Scotland. Furthermore, it is estimated that 46% of Ireland's population carries MC1R, the gene responsible for producing red hair. County Cork is home to the annual Irish Redhead Convention.

Having red hair is its own stereotype, and it is associated with undesirable behaviors, such as anger and being mischievous, "like a redheaded leprechaun".

=== Black Irish ===
The Black Irish – not Irish people of African descent, but white people of Irish ancestry who had black or dark hair, or an appearance similar to people from the ethnic groups indigenous to the land around the Mediterranean Sea – have been stereotyped as being especially prone to fighting. The appearance was also associated with anti-Black racial ridicule. Most Irish people today have dark brown or black hair, which is most often paired with blue or green eyes.

=== Religion ===
The Irish are often stereotyped as being devoutly religious and conservative. Christianity has been the largest religion in Ireland since the 5th century. As of 2022, 69% of Ireland's population adhered to the Catholic Church, and both Irish people and people with red hair are stereotyped as being Catholic. A 2018 study ranked Irish citizens between 16 and 29 among the most religious in Europe. However, a "Quiet Revolution" is taking place, and Ireland is becoming increasingly secular.

=== Enmity towards the British ===
Due to many events in the shared history between the nations, such as the Great Famine, there is a lasting sense of anti-British sentiment in Ireland. Despite the troubled history between the two nations, both share close economic ties.

=== Green eyes ===
Irish people are often stereotyped as having green eyes, Ireland is generally regarded as having the highest percentage of green eyed people in the world. Green eyes are often paired with dark hair in Ireland creating a striking contrast.

=== Friendly nature ===
Irish people have a reputation for friendliness and are often seen as warm and inviting. Irish people generally enjoy "slagging" others which is a form of inclusive playful banter.

== See also ==
- An Englishman, an Irishman and a Scotsman
- Russell Brothers (vaudeville)
- Stage Irish
