= Stage Irish =

Portryal of Irish people in plays

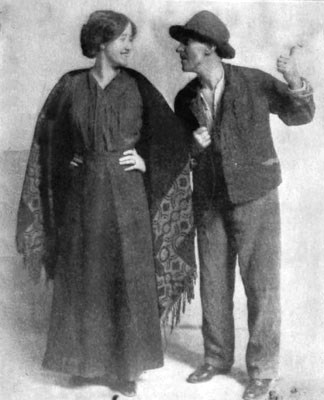
Irish actors Sara Allgood ("Widow Quin") and J. M. Kerrigan ("Shawn Keogh"), in The Playboy of the Western World, Plymouth Theatre, Boston, 1911. The play was attacked for replaying the insulting stereotype of the drunken, boasting, belligerent Irishman.

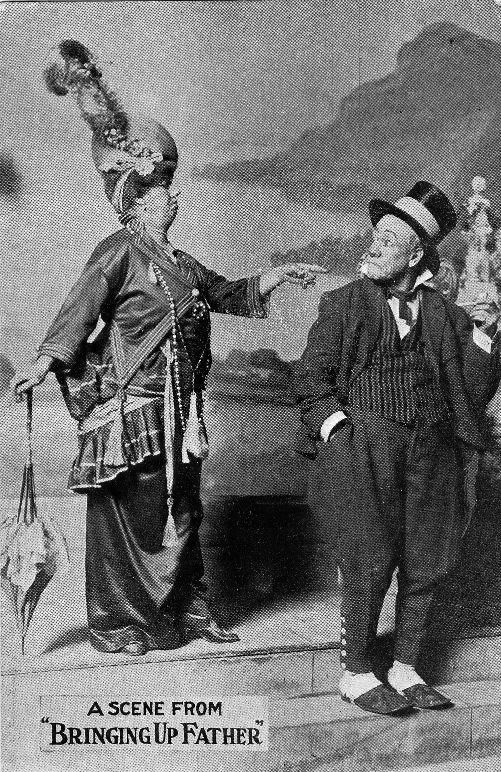
Maggie and Jiggs in a scene from the 1914 play Bringing Up Father

Stage Irish, also known as Drunk Irish, or collectively as Paddywhackery, is a stereotyped portrayal of Irish people once common in plays. It is an exaggerated or caricatured portrayal of supposed Irish characteristics in speech and behaviour. The stage Irishman was generally "garrulous, boastful, unreliable, hard-drinking, belligerent (though cowardly) and chronically impecunious". This caricature includes many cultural outlets, including the stage, cartoons published in Punch and English language clichés, including terms such as "Paddywagon" and "hooligan".

The early stage Irish persona arose in England in the context of the war between the Jacobites and Whig supporters of William of Orange at the end of the 17th century. Later, the stage Irish persona become more comic and less threatening. Irish writers also used the persona in a satirical way.

== Early examples ==
The character of Teg in Robert Howard's play Committee (1662) has been said to be the first example of the type, where an Irish servant outwits the enemies of his master with a show of false naïvety.

Captain Macmorris in Henry V by William Shakespeare has the line "What ish my nation?", which was later appropriated by modern Irish writers, becoming what The Oxford Companion to Irish Literature calls a "recurrent epigraph". However, Macmorris is a loyal and valiant supporter of Henry V, quite different from later, generally lower-class, stage Irishmen. Ben Johnson's The Irish Masque at Court (29 December 1613; printed 1616) is another early example of the conventions.

James Farewell's poem The Irish Hudibras (1689) was published in the wake of William's invasion of Ireland to suppress the Jacobite uprising. It is considered to be the principal origin of the stereotype. This takes the form of a parody of book VI of Virgil's Aeneid, in which Aeneas descends into the underworld. In the poem, this is replaced by Fingal in County Dublin, in which Irish costume, behaviour, and speech-patterns are parodied as if they were denizens of Hades. A companion piece, Hesperi-Neso-Grapica or A Description of the Western Isle by "W.M." was published in 1715. Pamphlets published under the title "Bog Witticisms" also parodied the supposed illogicality and stupidity of the Irish.

== 18th–20th centuries ==
Irish characters appeared in a number of plays during the 18th century. These were not all negative stereotypes. Sometimes the Irishman could be a noble, or at least sympathetic character. In others he could outwit others. Thomas Sheridan's play Captain O'Blunder is about a naive Irishman who in the end triumphs over his English rival. Lucius O'Trigger in Richard Brinsley Sheridan's The Rivals is an excessively quick-tempered individual. The character had to be rewritten because of complaints in Ireland that it was insultingly anti-Irish. All these characters were from the genteel social classes.

By the 19th century, the stage Irishman became more of a lower-class stereotype, associated with the emigrations of mid-century. Dion Boucicault's successful plays The Colleen Bawn (1860) and The Shaughraun (1874) included several Stage Irish characters. Boucicault was a Dublin native, and in his melodramas, Irish characters were framed in a more positive light. While still depicted as drunks and rogues, they functioned as stereotypical comic relief characters and received more characterization.

Although stage Irishness can be traced to the 18th century it was most prominent in the 19th century with publications such as Punch in Britain and Harper's Weekly and Puck in the United States publishing such cartoons. These depictions portrayed the Irish as "ignorant but harmless drudges, given to drink and emotional excesses, loving a fight, and not above a lie or a bit of minor thievery". Stereotypes regarding Hiberno-English and Irish physiology were also perpetuated, being given a Simian or Ape-like appearance.

Patriotic inversions of the stereotype appeared in Irish theatre, and Irish playwrights sometimes commented on the trope, as in Bernard Shaw in John Bull's Other Island and by John Millington Synge in The Playboy of the Western World. The latter play was condemned by Irish nationalists, including Sinn Féin leader Arthur Griffith, who described the play as "a vile and inhuman story told in the foulest language we have ever listened to from a public platform", and that it insulted Irish men and women.

Modern American superhero comics of the 20th century have been described as possessing "condescending conventions" of stage Irishness such as the language used by Irish characters. Early depictions of the Marvel superhero Sean Cassidy ('Banshee') have been described as bearing the physiological caricatures of the Irish that were present in Victorian English depictions.

Hollywood films have also invoked stage Irishness. The film Darby O'Gill and the Little People has been considered the "epitome" of paddywhackery.

== See also ==
- Anti-Irish sentiment / Hibernophobia
- Stereotypes of Irish Americans
- Stereotypes of Irish people
