= Eph Horn =

American blackface minstrel performer

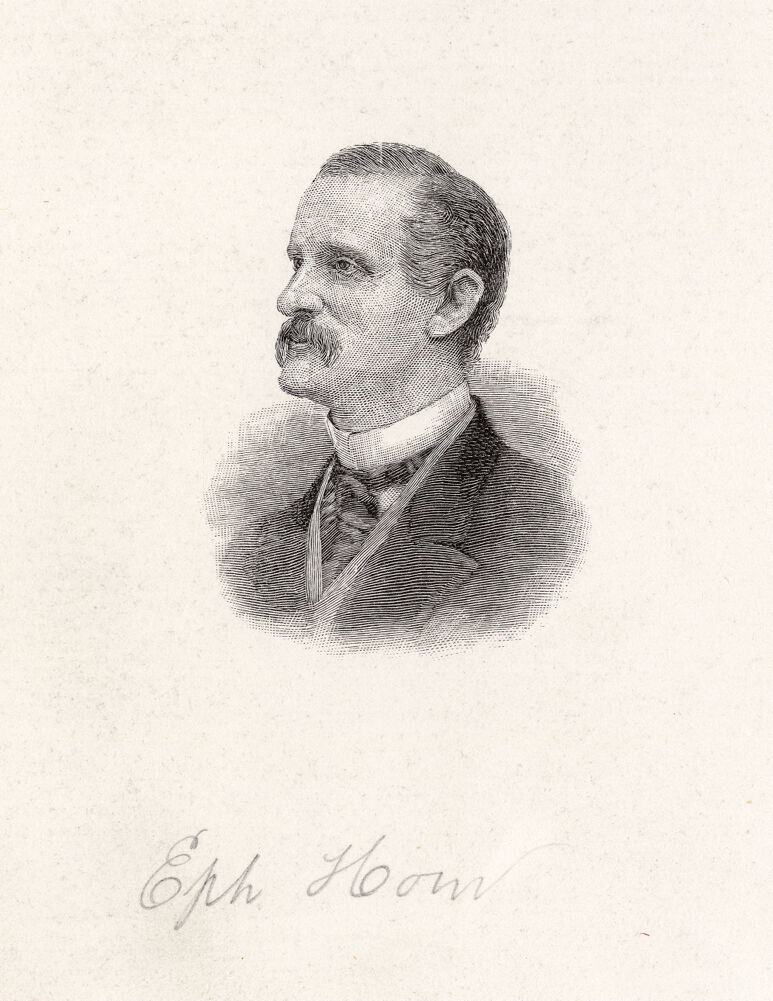

Eph Horn, born Evan Evans Horn, (1818-January 1, 1877) was a blackface minstrel performer from the United States. Born in Philadelphia, he became successful and toured including in England. He gave a sarcastic soliloquy on women's rights in one of his routines. His son Eoh Horn Jr. also became a minstrel performer.

He formed Horn and White's Minstrels with Charley White. He performed as a mesmerist early in his career. He performed with Dan Bryant and Bryant's Minstrels at the Boston Museum.

A woodcut portrait was made of him.

A list of his performances from 1862 to 1871 has been compiled. He died in New York.

== See also ==
- George Kunkel (theatre manager)
