= John Wilkes Booth =

American stage actor and assassin (1838–1865)

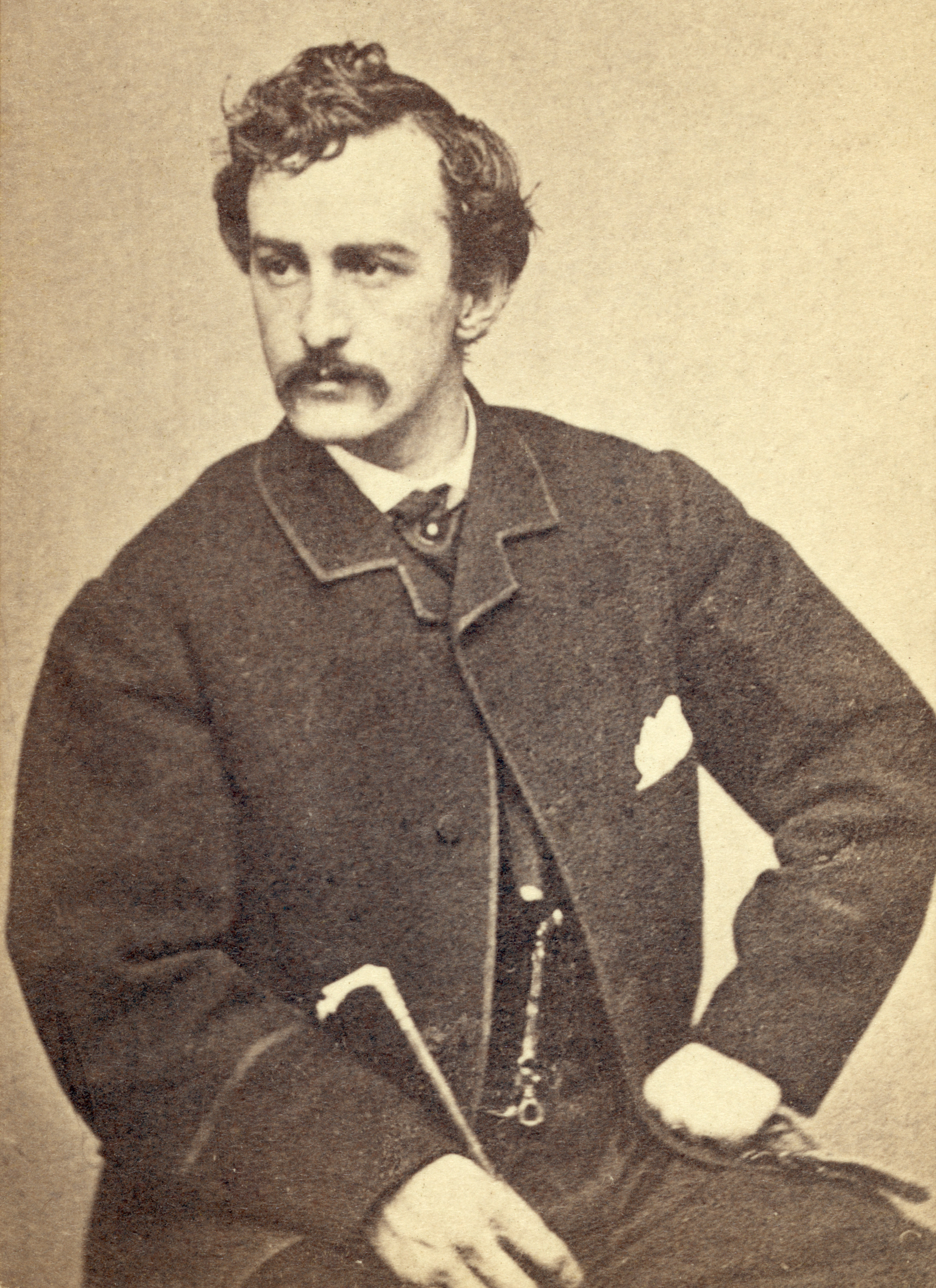
- Booth, c. 1865
- Born: May 10, 1838; Bel Air, Maryland, U.S.
- Died: April 26, 1865 (aged 26); Port Royal, Virginia, U.S. 38.1385°N 77.2302°W
- Cause of death: Gunshot wound
- Resting place: Green Mount Cemetery, Baltimore, Maryland
- Other names: J. B. Wilkes; Wilkes
- Occupation: Actor
- Years active: 1855–1865
- Known for: Assassination of Abraham Lincoln
- Political party: Know Nothing
- Parents: Junius Brutus Booth (father); Mary Ann Holmes (mother)
- Relatives: Junius Brutus Booth Jr. (brother); Edwin Booth (brother); Asia Booth Clarke (sister); Edwina Booth Grossman (niece)
- Family: Booth family

John Wilkes Booth (May 10, 1838 – April 26, 1865) was an American stage actor who assassinated United States president Abraham Lincoln at Ford's Theatre in Washington, D.C., on April 14, 1865. During the American Civil War he served as a Confederate spy; he opposed the then-recent abolition of slavery in the United States.

Booth was a noted actor from the prominent 19th-century Booth theatrical family from Maryland. During the Civil War, he was a Confederate sympathizer who denounced Lincoln and joined the Confederate Secret Service. Originally, Booth and his co-conspirators had plotted to kidnap Lincoln to aid the Confederacy before later deciding to murder him, Vice President Andrew Johnson, and Secretary of State William H. Seward. Although the Army of Northern Virginia, commanded by General Robert E. Lee, had surrendered to the Union Army four days earlier, Booth believed that the American Civil War remained unresolved because the Army of Tennessee of General Joseph E. Johnston continued fighting.

Booth shot Lincoln once in the back of the head. Lincoln's death the next morning completed Booth's piece of the plot. Seward, severely wounded, recovered, whereas Vice President Johnson was never attacked. Booth fled on horseback to Southern Maryland and was tracked down twelve days later, hiding in a barn in rural Virginia. Booth's companion David Herold surrendered, but Booth maintained a standoff. After the authorities set the barn ablaze, Union soldier Boston Corbett fatally shot him in the neck. Paralyzed, he died a few hours later. Of the eight conspirators later convicted, four were hanged.

== Background and early life ==
Booth's parents were noted British Shakespearean actor Junius Brutus Booth and his mistress, Mary Ann Holmes, who moved to the United States from England in June 1821. They purchased a 150-acre (61 ha) farm near Bel Air, Maryland, where John Wilkes Booth was born in a four-room log house on May 10, 1838, the ninth of ten children.

He was named after English radical politician John Wilkes, a distant relative. Thirty years after he had absconded across the Atlantic Ocean, Junius' wife Adelaide Delannoy Booth was granted a divorce in 1851 on grounds of adultery, and Holmes legally wed Junius on May 10, 1851, John Wilkes' 13th birthday. Nora Titone suggests in her book My Thoughts Be Bloody (2010) that the shame and ambition of Junius Brutus Booth's actor sons Edwin and John Wilkes eventually spurred them to strive for achievement and acclaim as rivals—Edwin as a Unionist and John Wilkes as the assassin of Abraham Lincoln.

Booth's father built Tudor Hall on the Harford County property as the family's summer home in 1851, while also maintaining a winter residence on Exeter Street in Baltimore. The Booth family was listed as living in Baltimore in the 1850 census.

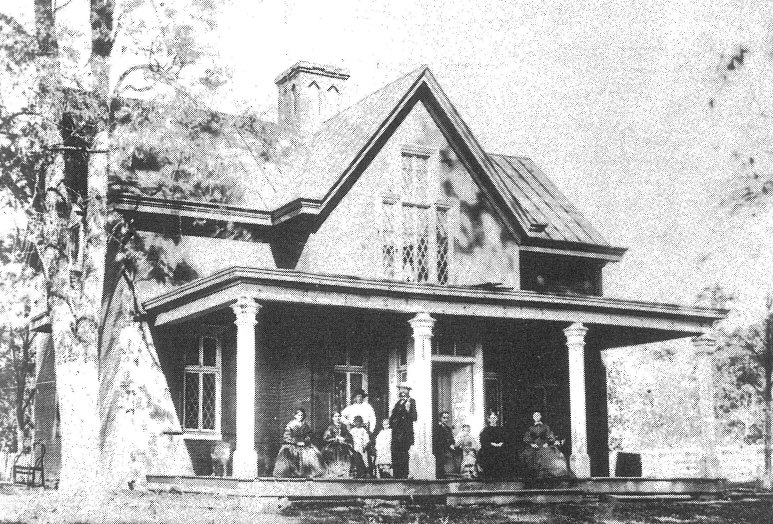
Tudor Hall in 1865

As a boy, Booth was athletic and popular, and he became skilled at horsemanship and fencing. He attended the Bel Air Academy and was an indifferent student whom the headmaster thought was "not deficient in intelligence, but disinclined to take advantage of the educational opportunities offered him." In 1850–1851, he attended the Quaker-run Milton Boarding School for Boys located in Sparks, Maryland, and later St. Timothy's Hall, an Episcopal military academy in Catonsville, Maryland where he was baptized by Reverend Libertus Van Bokkelen. At the Milton school, students recited classical works by such authors as Cicero, Herodotus, and Tacitus. Students at St. Timothy's Hall wore military uniforms and were subject to a regimen of daily formation drills and strict discipline. Booth left school at 14 after his father's death.

While attending the Milton Boarding School, Booth met a Romani fortune-teller who read his palm and pronounced a grim destiny, telling him that he would have a grand but short life, doomed to die young and "meeting a bad end". His sister recalled that he wrote down the palm-reader's prediction, showed it to his family and others, and often discussed its portents in moments of melancholy.

By age 16, Booth was interested in the theater and in politics, and he became a delegate from Bel Air to a rally by the Know Nothing Party for Henry Winter Davis, the anti-immigrant party's candidate for Congress in the 1854 elections. Booth aspired to follow in the footsteps of his father and his actor brothers Edwin and Junius Brutus Jr. He began practicing elocution daily in the woods around Tudor Hall and studying Shakespeare.

== Theatrical career ==
=== 1850s ===
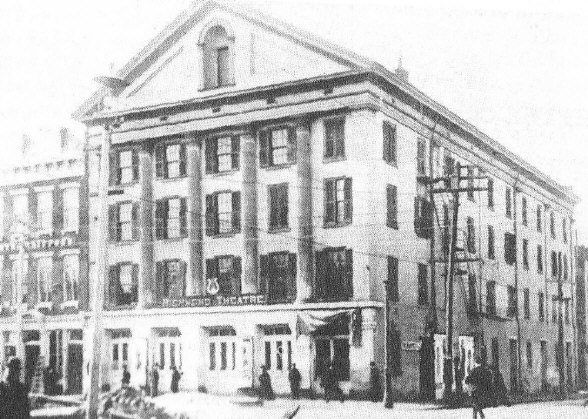
The Richmond Theatre, Richmond, Virginia, in 1858, when Booth, who had started acting in 1855, made his first stage appearance there in the repertory company

Booth made his stage debut at age 17 on August 14, 1855, in the supporting role of the Earl of Richmond in Richard III at Baltimore's Charles Street Theatre. The audience jeered at him when he missed some of his lines. He also began acting at Baltimore's Holliday Street Theater, owned by family friend John T. Ford, where the Booths performed frequently. In 1857 he joined the stock company of the Arch Street Theatre in Philadelphia, where he played for a full season. At his request, he was billed as "J. B. Wilkes", a pseudonym meant to avoid comparison with other members of his famous thespian family. Jim Bishop wrote that Booth "developed into an outrageous scene stealer, but he played his parts with such heightened enthusiasm that the audiences idolized him." In February 1858, he played in Lucrezia Borgia at the Arch Street Theatre. On opening night, he experienced stage fright and stumbled over one of his lines. Instead of introducing himself by saying, "Madame, I am Petruchio Pandolfo", he stammered, "Madame, I am Pondolfio Pet—Pedolfio Pat—Pantuchio Ped—dammit! Who am I?", causing the audience to roar with laughter.

Later that year, Booth played the part of Mohegan Indian Chief Uncas in a play staged in Petersburg, Virginia, and then became a stock company actor at the Richmond Theatre (then known as the Marshall Theatre) in Virginia, which was co-managed by George Kunkel, John T. Ford, and Thomas L. Moxley. There he became increasingly popular with audiences for his energetic performances. On October 5, 1858, he played the part of Horatio in Hamlet, alongside his older brother Edwin in the title role. Afterward, Edwin led him to the theater's footlights and said to the audience, "I think he's done well, don't you?" In response, the audience applauded loudly and cried, "Yes! Yes!" In all, Booth performed in 83 plays in 1858. Booth said that, of all Shakespearean characters, his favorite role was Brutus, the slayer of a tyrant.

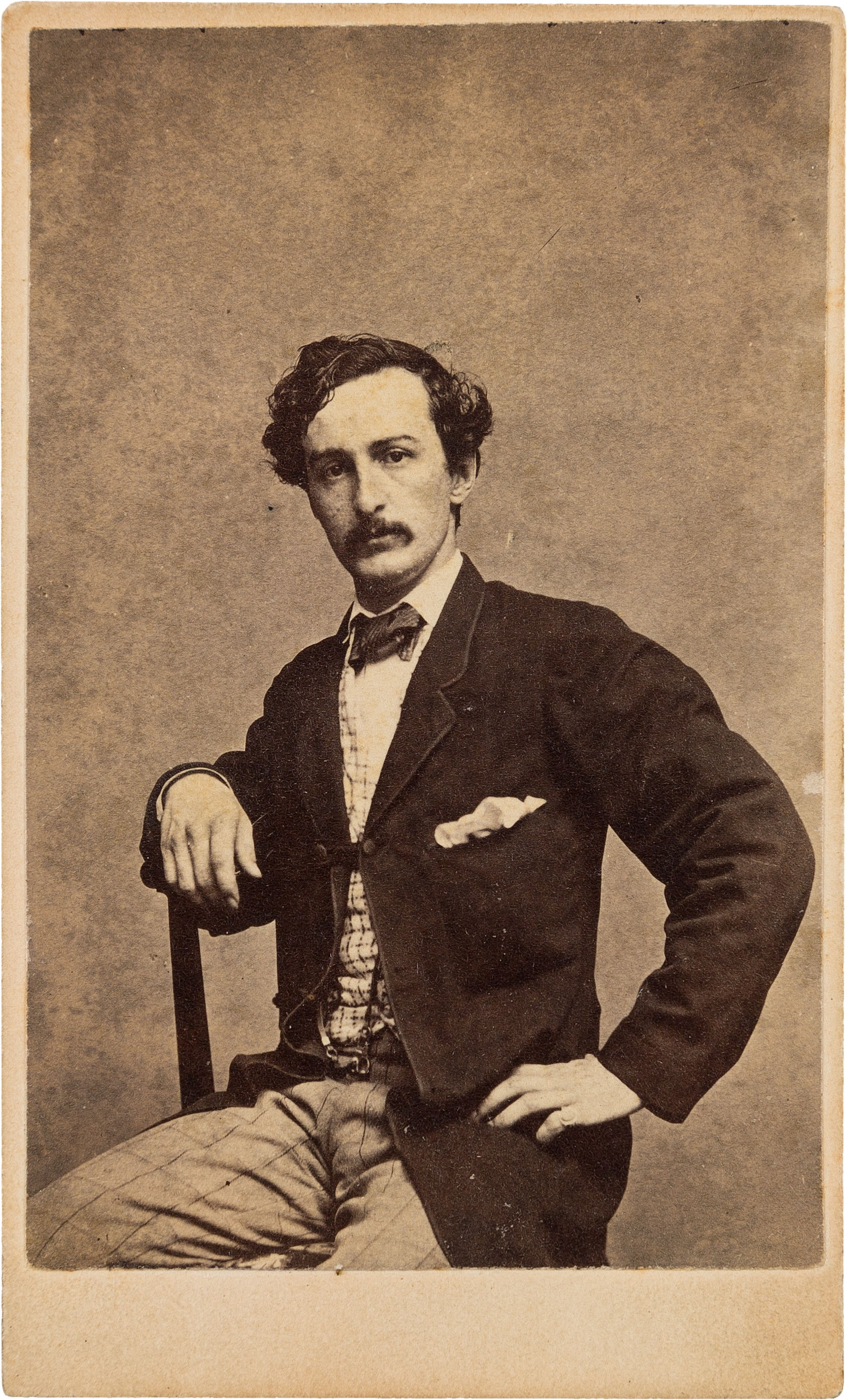
A carte de visite of John Wilkes Booth

Some critics called Booth "the handsomest man in America" and a "natural genius", and noted his having an "astonishing memory"; others were mixed in their estimation of his acting. He stood 5 feet 8 inches (1.73 m) tall, had jet-black hair, and was lean and athletic. Noted Civil War reporter George Alfred Townsend described him as a "muscular, perfect man" with "curling hair, like a Corinthian capital". Booth's stage performances were often characterized by his contemporaries as acrobatic and intensely physical, with him leaping upon the stage and gesturing with passion. He was an excellent swordsman, although a fellow actor once recalled that Booth occasionally cut himself with his own sword.

Historian Benjamin Platt Thomas wrote that Booth "won celebrity with theater-goers by his romantic personal attraction", and that he was "too impatient for hard study" and his "brilliant talents had failed of full development." Author Gene Smith wrote that Booth's acting may not have been as precise as his brother Edwin's, but his strikingly handsome appearance enthralled women. As the 1850s drew to a close, Booth was becoming wealthy as an actor, earning $20,000 a year (equivalent to $700,000 in 2025).

=== 1860s ===
Booth embarked on his first national tour as a leading actor after finishing the 1859–1860 theatre season in Richmond, Virginia. He engaged Philadelphia attorney Matthew Canning to serve as his agent. By mid-1860, he was playing in such cities as New York; Boston; Chicago; Cleveland; St. Louis; Columbus, Georgia; Montgomery, Alabama; and New Orleans. Poet and journalist Walt Whitman said of Booth's acting, "He would have flashes, passages, I thought of real genius." The Philadelphia Press drama critic said, "Without having [his brother] Edwin's culture and grace, Mr. Booth has far more action, more life, and, we are inclined to think, more natural genius." In October 1860, while performing in Columbus, Georgia, Booth was shot accidentally in his hotel, leaving a wound some thought would end his life.

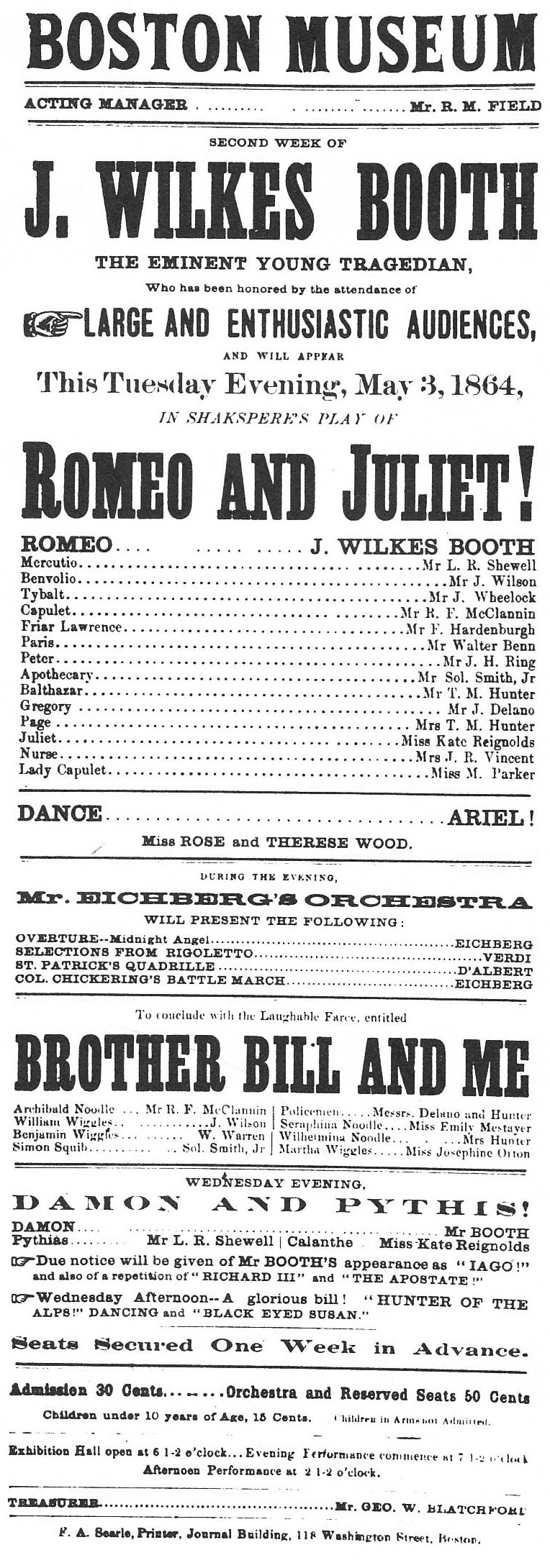
Boston Museum playbill advertising Booth in Romeo and Juliet, May 3, 1864

When the Civil War began on April 12, 1861, Booth was starring in Albany, New York. He was outspoken in his admiration for the South's secession, publicly calling it "heroic." This so enraged local citizens that they demanded that he be banned from the stage for making "treasonable statements". Albany's drama critics were kinder, giving him rave reviews. One called him a genius, praising his acting for "never fail[ing] to delight with his masterly impressions."

As the Civil War raged across the divided land in 1862, Booth appeared mostly in Union and border states. In January, he played the title role in Richard III in St. Louis and then made his Chicago debut. In March, he made his first acting appearance in New York City. In May 1862, he made his Boston debut, playing nightly at the Boston Museum in Richard III (May 12, 15 and 23), Romeo and Juliet (May 13), The Robbers (May 14 and 21), Hamlet (May 16), The Apostate (May 19), The Stranger (May 20), and The Lady of Lyons (May 22). Following his performance of Richard III on May 12, the Boston Transcript's review the next day called Booth "the most promising young actor on the American stage".

Starting in January 1863, he returned to the Boston Museum for a series of plays, including the role of villain Duke Pescara in The Apostate, that won him acclaim from audiences and critics. Back in Washington in April, he played the title roles in Hamlet and Richard III, one of his favorites. He was billed as "The Pride of the American People, A Star of the First Magnitude", and critics were equally enthusiastic. The National Republican drama critic said that Booth "took the hearts of the audience by storm" and termed his performance "a complete triumph". At the beginning of July 1863, Booth finished the acting season at Cleveland's Academy of Music, as the Battle of Gettysburg raged in Pennsylvania. Between September and November 1863, Booth played a hectic schedule in the northeastern United States, appearing in Boston, Providence, Rhode Island, and Hartford, Connecticut. Every day he received fan mail from infatuated women.

Family friend John T. Ford opened 1,500-seat Ford's Theatre on November 9 in Washington, D.C. Booth was one of the first leading men to appear there, playing in Charles Selby's The Marble Heart. In this play, Booth portrayed a Greek sculptor in costume, making marble statues come to life. Lincoln watched the play from his box. At one point during the performance, Booth was said to have shaken his finger in Lincoln's direction as he delivered a line of dialogue. Lincoln's sister-in-law was sitting with him in the same presidential box where he was later slain; she turned to him and said, "Mr. Lincoln, he looks as if he meant that for you." The president replied, "He does look pretty sharp at me, doesn't he?" On another occasion, Lincoln's son Tad saw Booth perform. He said that the actor thrilled him, prompting Booth to give Tad a rose. Booth ignored an invitation to visit Lincoln between acts.

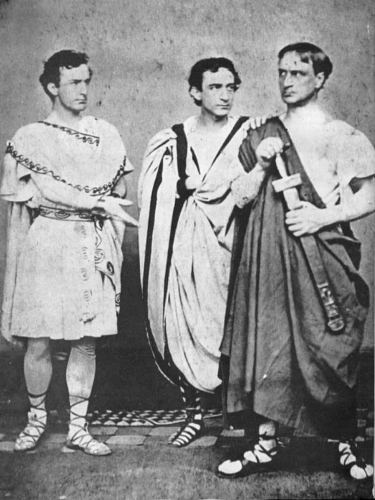
Left to right: Booth with brothers Edwin and Junius Jr. in Julius Caesar

On November 25, 1864, Booth performed for the only time with his brothers Edwin and Junius in a single engagement production of Julius Caesar at the Winter Garden Theatre in New York. He played Mark Antony, which required that he shave off his mustache, and his brother Edwin had the larger role of Brutus in a performance acclaimed as "the greatest theatrical event in New York history." Their eldest brother Junius played Cassius. The proceeds went towards a statue of William Shakespeare for Central Park, which still stands today (2019).

In January 1865, having regrown out his mustache, he acted in Shakespeare's Romeo and Juliet in Washington, again garnering rave reviews. The National Intelligencer called Booth's Romeo "the most satisfactory of all renderings of that fine character", especially praising the death scene. Booth made the final appearance of his acting career at Ford's on March 18, 1865, when he again played Duke Pescara in The Apostate.

== Business ventures ==
Booth invested some of his growing wealth in various enterprises during the early 1860s, including land speculation in Boston's Back Bay section. He also started a business partnership with John A. Ellsler, manager of the Cleveland Academy of Music, and with Thomas Mears to develop oil wells in northwestern Pennsylvania, where the Pennsylvania oil rush had begun in August 1859, following Edwin Drake's discovery of oil there, initially calling their venture Dramatic Oil but later renaming it Fuller Farm Oil. The partners invested in a 31.5-acre (12.7 ha) site for drilling along the Allegheny River at Franklin, Pennsylvania in late 1863.

By early 1864, they had a producing 1,900-foot (579 m) deep oil well named Wilhelmina for Mears' wife, yielding 25 barrels (4 kL) of crude oil daily, then considered a good yield. The Fuller Farm Oil company was selling shares with a prospectus featuring the well-known actor's celebrity status as "Mr. J. Wilkes Booth, a successful and intelligent operator in oil lands". The partners were impatient to increase the well's output and attempted the use of explosives, which wrecked the well and ended production.

Booth was already growing more obsessed with the South's worsening situation in the Civil War and was angered at Lincoln's re-election. He withdrew from the oil business on November 27, 1864, with a substantial loss of his $6,000 investment ($123,511 today).

== Civil War ==
Booth was strongly opposed to the abolitionists who sought to end slavery in the United States. He attended the hanging of abolitionist leader John Brown on December 2, 1859, who was executed for treason, murder, and inciting a slave insurrection, charges resulting from his raid on the Federal armory at Harpers Ferry, Virginia (since 1863, West Virginia). Booth had been rehearsing at the Richmond Theatre when he read in a newspaper about Brown's upcoming execution. So as to gain access that the public would not have, he donned a borrowed uniform of the Richmond Grays, a volunteer militia of 1,500 men traveling to Charles Town for Brown's hanging, to guard against a possible attempt to rescue Brown from the gallows by force. When Brown was hanged without incident, Booth stood near the scaffold and afterwards expressed great satisfaction with Brown's fate, although he admired the condemned man's bravery in facing death stoically.

Lincoln was elected president on November 6, 1860, and the following month Booth drafted a long speech, apparently never delivered, that decried Northern abolitionism and made clear his strong support of the South and the institution of slavery. On April 12, 1861, the Civil War began, and eventually eleven Southern states seceded from the Union. In Booth's native Maryland, some of the slaveholding portion of the population favored joining the new Confederate States of America. Although the Maryland legislature voted decisively (53–13) against secession on April 28, 1861, it also voted not to allow federal troops to pass south through the state by rail, and it requested that Lincoln remove the growing numbers of federal troops in Maryland. The legislature seems to have wanted to remain in the Union while also wanting to avoid involvement in a war against Southern neighbors.

Adhering to Maryland's demand that its infrastructure not be used to wage war on seceding neighbors would have left the federal capital of Washington, D.C., exposed, and would have made the prosecution of war against the South impossible, which was no doubt the legislature's intention. Lincoln suspended the writ of habeas corpus and imposed martial law in Baltimore and other portions of the state, ordering the imprisonment of many Maryland political leaders at Fort McHenry and the stationing of Federal troops in Baltimore. Many Marylanders, including Booth, agreed with the ruling of Marylander and U.S. Supreme Court Chief Justice Roger B. Taney, in Ex parte Merryman, that Lincoln's suspension of habeas corpus in Maryland was unconstitutional.

Booth was pro-Confederate, but his family was divided, like many Marylanders. He was outspoken in his love of the South, and equally outspoken in his hatred of Lincoln. As the Civil War went on, Booth increasingly quarreled with his brother Edwin, who declined to make stage appearances in the South and refused to listen to John Wilkes' fiercely partisan denunciations of the North and Lincoln.

In late 1860 Booth was initiated into the Knights of the Golden Circle, a secret society whose initial objective was to acquire territories as slave states.

=== Confederate Secret Service ===
John Wilkes Booth joined the Confederate Secret Service during the Civil War, acting as a spy for the Confederacy. This work was facilitated by the fact that as a popular actor in the 1860s, Booth continued to travel extensively to perform in the North and South, and as far west as New Orleans. According to his sister Asia, Booth confided to her that he also used his position to smuggle the anti-malarial drug quinine, which was crucial to the lives of residents of the Gulf coast, to the South during his travels there, since it was in short supply due to the Northern blockade. Asia described her brother as “a spy, a blockade-runner, a rebel!” Historian Thomas Goodrich concludes that Booth entered the Confederate Secret Service as a spy and courier.

Throughout the Civil War, the Confederacy maintained a network of underground operators in southern Maryland, particularly in Charles and St. Mary's Counties, smuggling recruits across the Potomac River into Virginia and relaying messages for Confederate agents as far north as Canada. Booth recruited his friends Samuel Arnold and Michael O'Laughlen as accomplices. They met often at the house of Confederate sympathizer Maggie Branson at 16 North Eutaw Street in Baltimore. He also met with several well-known Confederate sympathizers at The Parker House in Boston.

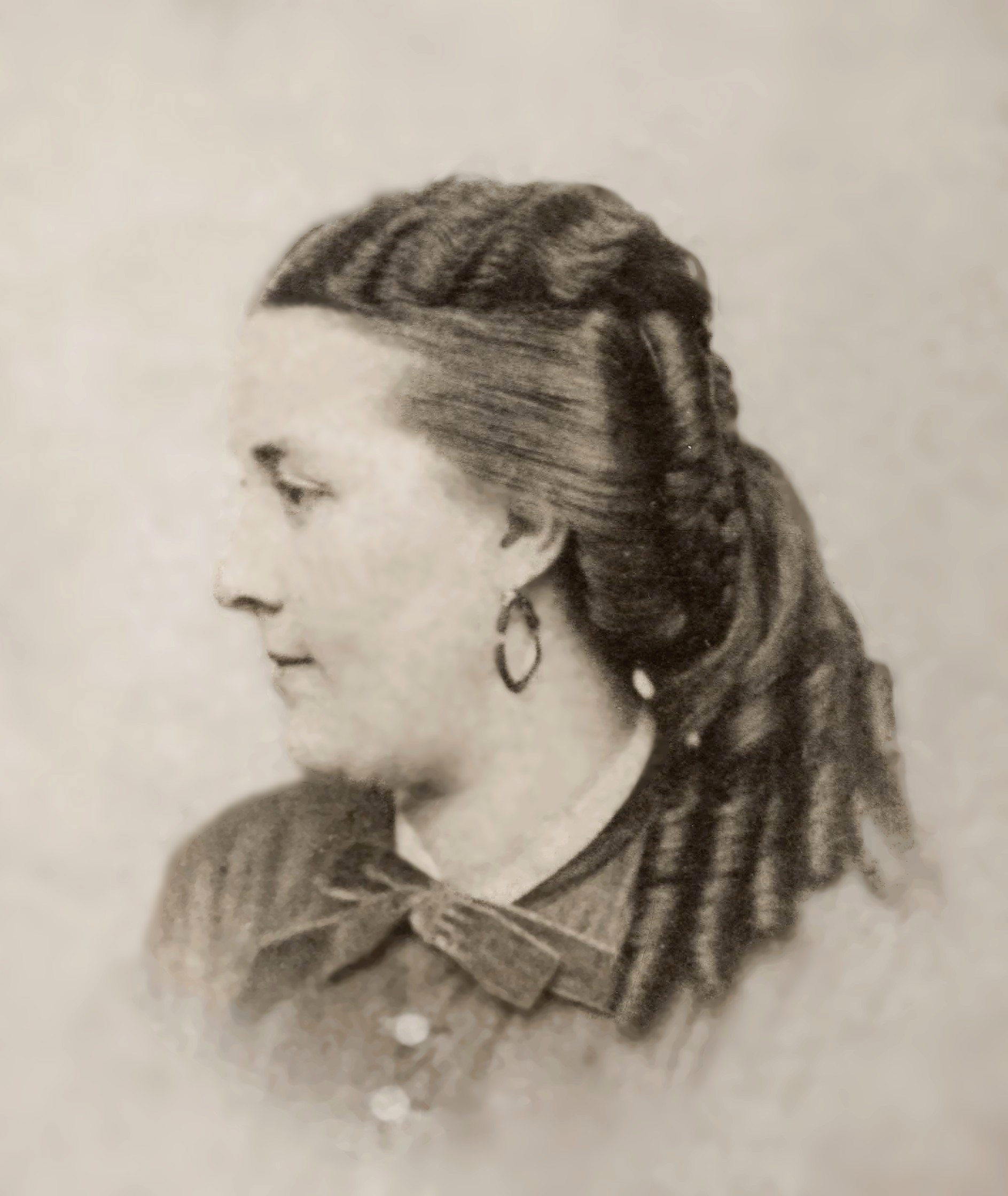
Lucy Lambert Hale, Booth's fiancée in 1865

In early 1863, Booth was arrested in St. Louis while on a theatre tour when he was heard saying that he "wished the President and the whole damned government would go to hell". He was charged with making "treasonous" remarks against the government, but was released when he took an oath of allegiance to the Union and paid a substantial fine.

Some scholars speculate Booth joined the Confederate Secret Service in March 1864, although the exact circumstances are unknown. In October 1864, Booth made an unexplained trip to Montreal, which was a center of clandestine Confederate activity. He spent ten days in the city, staying for a time at St. Lawrence Hall, a rendezvous for the Confederate Secret Service, and meeting several other Confederate agents there.

=== Plot to kidnap Lincoln ===
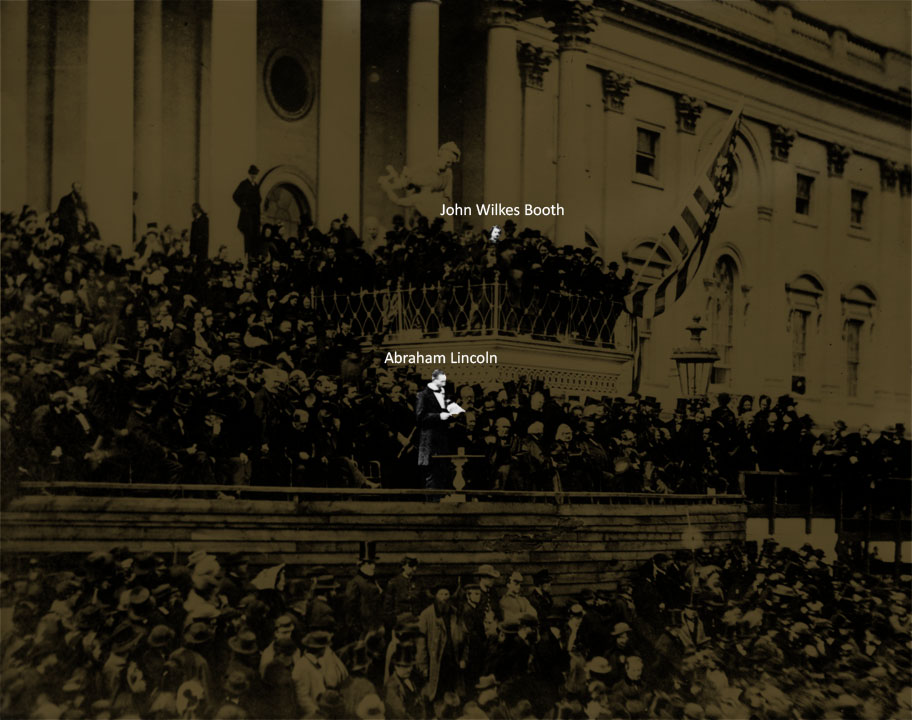
President Lincoln and Booth are highlighted at Lincoln's second inauguration.

As the 1864 presidential election drew near, the Confederacy's prospects for victory were ebbing, and the tide of war increasingly favored the North. The likelihood of Lincoln's re-election filled Booth with rage towards the president, whom Booth blamed for the war and all of the South's troubles. Booth had promised his mother at the outbreak of war that he would not enlist as a soldier, but he increasingly chafed at not fighting for the South, writing in a letter to her, "I have begun to deem myself a coward and to despise my own existence."

Booth began to formulate plans to kidnap Lincoln from his summer residence at the Old Soldiers Home, three miles (4.8 km) from the White House, and to smuggle him across the Potomac River and into Richmond, Virginia. Once in Confederate hands, Lincoln would be exchanged for Confederate Army prisoners of war held in Northern prisons, which, Booth reasoned, would bring the war to an end by emboldening opposition to the war in the North or forcing Union recognition of the Confederate government.

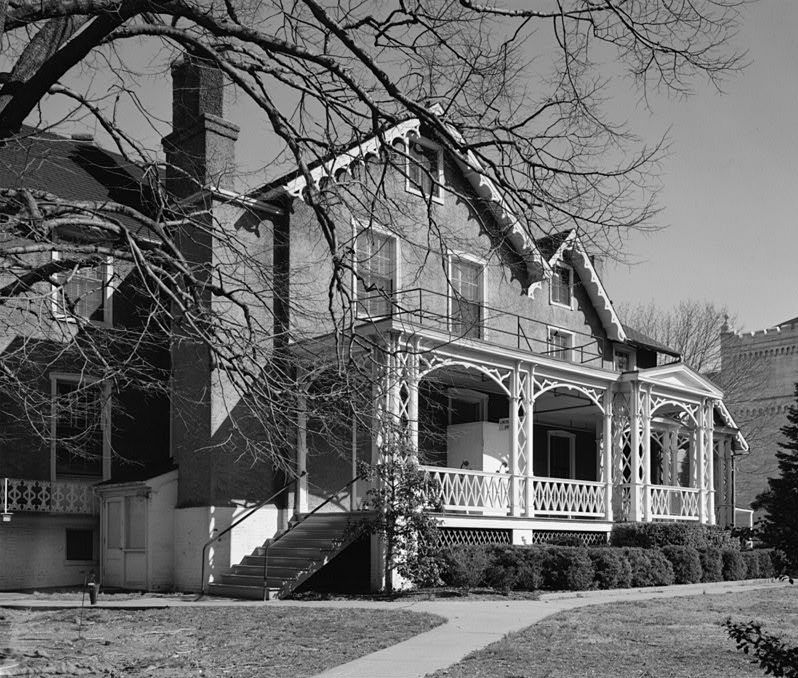
The Old Soldiers Home, where Booth planned to kidnap Lincoln

No conclusive proof has linked Booth's kidnapping or assassination plots to a conspiracy involving the leadership of the Confederate government, but historian David Herbert Donald states that "at least at the lower levels of the Southern secret service, the abduction of the Union President was under consideration."

Lincoln won a landslide re-election in early November 1864, on a platform that advocated abolishing slavery altogether by Constitutional amendment. Booth, meanwhile, devoted increased energy and money to his kidnapping plot. He assembled a loose-knit band of Confederate sympathizers, including David Herold, George Atzerodt, Lewis Powell (also known as Lewis Payne or Paine), and rebel agent John Surratt. They began to meet routinely at the boarding house of Surratt's mother, Mary Surratt, in Washington.

By this time, John was arguing vehemently with his pro-Union brother Edwin about Lincoln and the war, and Edwin finally told him that he was no longer welcome at his New York home. Booth also railed against Lincoln in conversations with his sister Asia. "That man's appearance, his pedigree, his coarse low jokes and anecdotes, his vulgar similes, and his policy are a disgrace to the seat he holds. He is made the tool of the North, to crush out slavery." Asia recalled that he decried Lincoln's re-election, "making himself a king", and that he went on "wild tirades" in 1865, as the Confederacy's defeat became more certain.

In February 1865, Booth became infatuated with Lucy Lambert Hale, the daughter of U.S. Senator John P. Hale of New Hampshire, and they became secretly engaged when Booth received his mother's blessing for their marriage plans. "You have so often been dead in love," his mother counseled Booth in a letter, "be well assured she is really and truly devoted to you." Booth composed a handwritten Valentine card for his fiancée on February 13, expressing his "adoration". She was unaware of Booth's deep antipathy towards Lincoln. Booth attended Lincoln's second inauguration on March 4 as the guest of his secret fiancée Lucy Hale. In the crowd were Powell, Atzerodt, and Herold. There was no attempt to assassinate Lincoln during the inauguration. However, Booth later remarked about his "excellent chance...to kill the President, if I had wished".

On March 17, he learned that Lincoln would be attending a performance of the play Still Waters Run Deep at a hospital near the Soldier's Home. He assembled his team on a stretch of road near the Soldier's Home in the hope of kidnapping Lincoln en route to the hospital, but the president did not appear. Booth later learned that Lincoln had changed his plans at the last moment to attend a reception at the National Hotel in Washington, where Booth was staying.

== Assassination of Lincoln ==
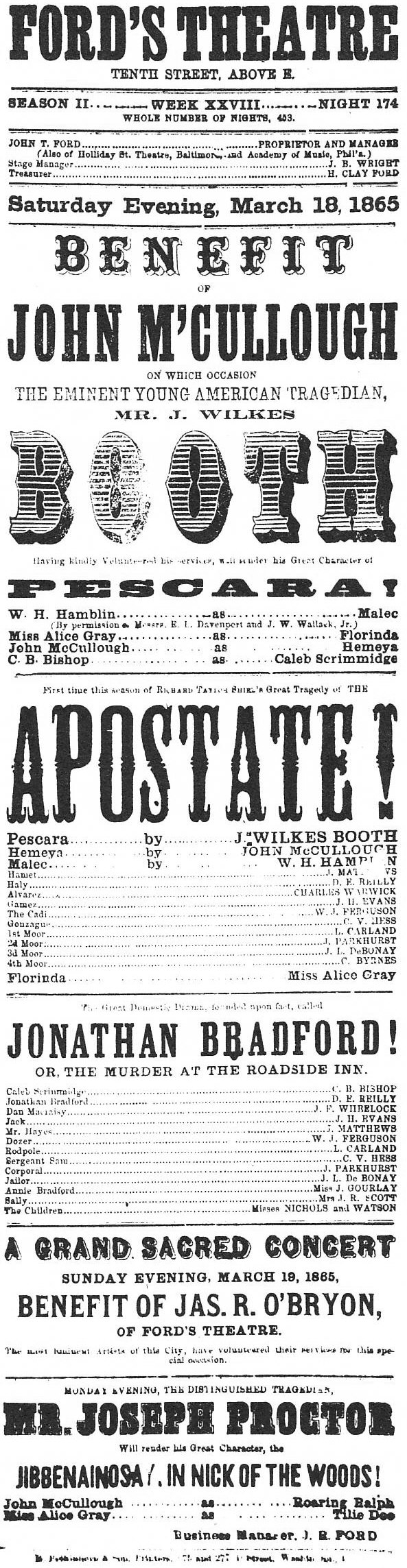
March 18, 1865, Ford's Theatre playbill—Booth's last acting appearance

On April 11, 1865, Booth was in the crowd outside the White House when Lincoln gave an impromptu speech from a White House window. During the speech, Lincoln stated that he was in favor of granting suffrage to former slaves; infuriated, Booth vowed to kill him and allegedly declared that it would be the last speech that Lincoln would ever make.

On April 12, 1865, Booth heard the news that the Army of Northern Virginia under Robert E. Lee had surrendered at Appomattox Court House. He told Louis J. Weichmann, a friend of John Surratt and a boarder at Mary Surratt's house, that he was done with the stage and that the only play he wanted to present henceforth was Venice Preserv'd. Weichmann did not understand the reference; Venice Preserv'd is about an assassination plot. Booth's scheme to kidnap Lincoln was no longer feasible with the Union Army's capture of Richmond and Lee's surrender, and he changed his goal to assassination.

On the morning of Good Friday, April 14, 1865, Booth went to Ford's Theatre to get his mail. While there, he was told by John Ford's brother that the president and his wife Mary Todd Lincoln would be attending the play Our American Cousin at Ford's Theatre that evening, accompanied by General Ulysses S. Grant and his wife.

Booth immediately set about making plans for the assassination, which included making arrangements with livery stable owner James W. Pumphrey for a getaway horse and an escape route. Later that night, at 8:45 pm, Booth informed Powell, Herold, and Atzerodt of his intention to kill Lincoln. He assigned Powell to assassinate Secretary of State William H. Seward, and Atzerodt to do the same to Vice President Andrew Johnson. Herold would assist in their escape into Virginia.

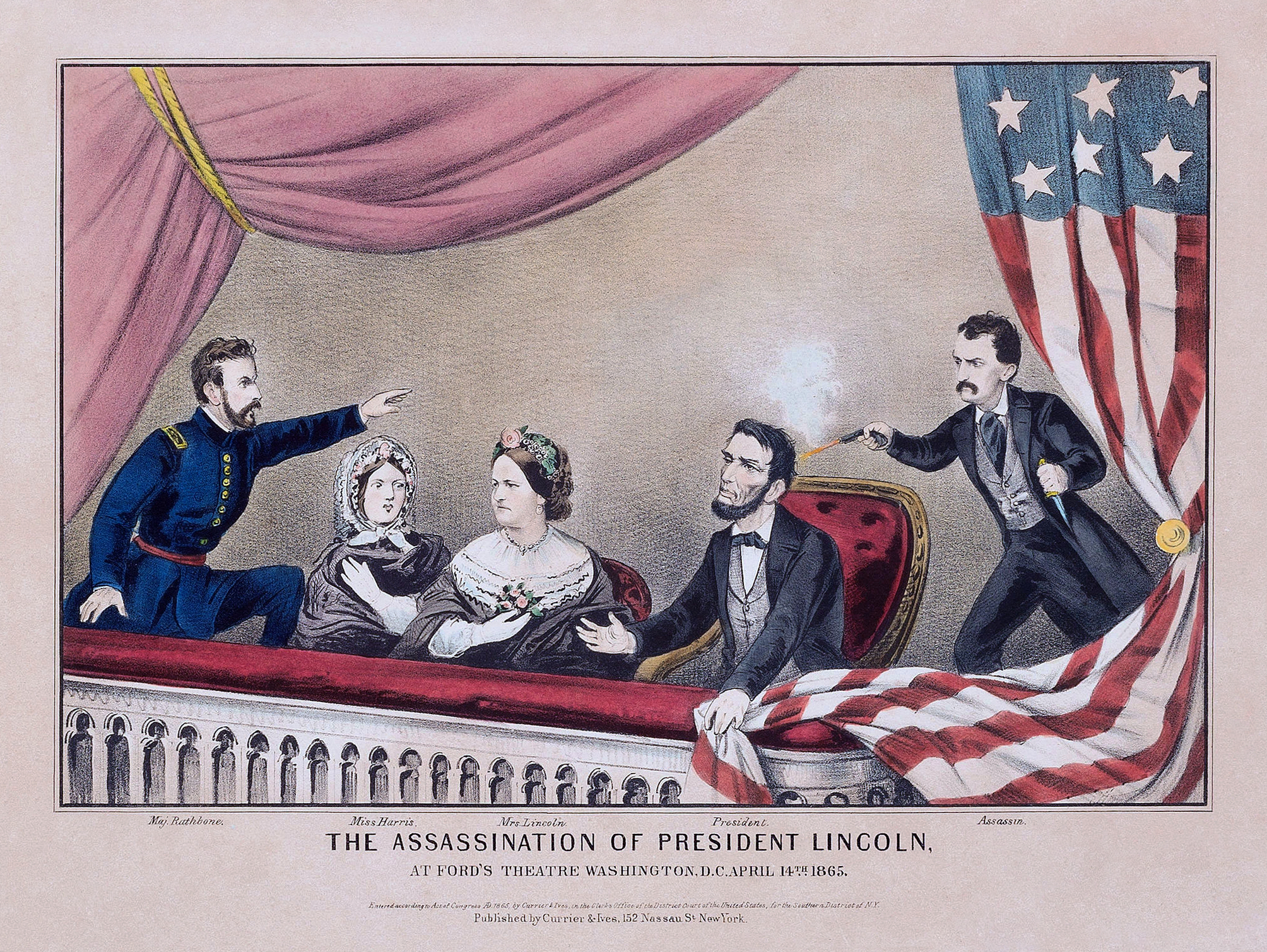
Currier and Ives depiction of Lincoln's assassination. L-to-r: Maj. Rathbone, Clara Harris, Mary Todd Lincoln, Pres. Lincoln, and Booth

Historian Michael W. Kauffman wrote that, by targeting Lincoln and his two immediate successors to the presidency, Booth seems to have intended to decapitate the Union government and throw it into a state of panic and confusion. However, in 1865, the second presidential successor would have been the president pro tempore of the U.S. Senate, Lafayette S. Foster, rather than Secretary Seward.

The possibility of assassinating the Union Army's commanding general as well was foiled when Grant declined the theatre invitation at his wife's insistence. Instead, the Grants departed Washington by train that evening for a visit to relatives in New Jersey. Booth had hoped that the assassinations would create sufficient chaos within the Union that the Confederate government could reorganize and continue the war if one Confederate army remained in the field or, failing that, would avenge the South's defeat.

As a famous and popular actor, Booth had free access to all parts of Ford's Theatre. Additionally, he had frequently performed there and was well known to its owner John T. Ford, even to the point of having his mail delivered there. Many believe that Booth had bored a spyhole into the door of the presidential box earlier that day, so that he could observe the box's occupants and verify that the president had made it to the play. However, an April 1962 letter from Frank Ford, son of the theatre manager Harry Clay Ford, to George Olszewski, a National Park Service historian, states that "Booth did not bore the hole in the door leading to the box [...]. The hole was bored by my father ... [to] allow the guard ... to look into the box".

After spending time at the neighboring Star Saloon during an intermission, Booth entered Ford's Theatre one last time at 10:10 pm. Once in the theater, he slipped into Lincoln's box at around 10:14 p.m. as the play was in progress, and shot the president in the back of the head from point-blank range with a .41 caliber Deringer pistol. Booth's escape was almost thwarted by Major Henry Rathbone, who was sitting in the presidential box along with his fiancée Clara Harris and Mary Todd Lincoln. After shooting Lincoln, Booth stabbed Rathbone when the startled officer lunged at him.

Booth then jumped from the president's box to the stage, where he raised his knife and shouted "Sic semper tyrannis"—Latin for "Thus always to tyrants", attributed to Brutus at Caesar's assassination, which had also been adopted as the state motto of Virginia and was mentioned in the new "Maryland, My Maryland", the future anthem of Booth's home state of Maryland.

According to some accounts, Booth added, "I have done it, the South is avenged!" Witnesses reported that, while jumping from the presidential box, Booth appeared to have snagged his spur on a decorative U.S. Treasury Guard flag, which caused him to fall awkwardly to the stage, resulting in him fracturing his leg.

Booth was the only one of the assassins to succeed in their mission. Powell was able to stab Seward, who was bedridden as a result of an earlier carriage accident, but although Seward was seriously wounded, he survived. Atzerodt lost his nerve and rather than attempting to assassinate Vice President Johnson, he spent the evening drinking, never making an attempt to kill Johnson.

== Reaction and pursuit ==
Booth fled Ford's Theatre by a stage door to the alley, where his getaway horse was held for him by Joseph "Peanuts" Burroughs. The owner of the horse had warned Booth that the horse was high-spirited and would break halter if left unattended. Booth had left the horse with Edmund Spangler and Spangler had in turn arranged for Burroughs to hold it.

Booth rode into southern Maryland, accompanied by David Herold, having planned his escape route to take advantage of the sparsely settled area's lack of telegraphs and railroads, along with its predominantly Confederate sympathies. He thought that the area's dense forests and the swampy terrain of Zekiah Swamp made it ideal for an escape route into rural Virginia. At midnight, Booth and Herold arrived at Surratt's Tavern on the Brandywine Pike, 9 miles (14 km) from Washington, where they had stored their "shooting irons" and equipment as part of the kidnap plot.

The duo then continued southward, stopping before dawn on April 15 for treatment of Booth's injured leg at the home of Samuel Mudd in St. Catharine, 25 miles (40 km) from Washington. Mudd later said that Booth told him the injury occurred when his horse fell. The next day, Booth and Herold arrived at the home of Samuel Cox around 4 am. As the two fugitives hid in the woods nearby, Cox contacted Thomas A. Jones, his foster brother and a Confederate agent in charge of spy operations in the southern Maryland area since 1862. The War Department advertised a $100,000 reward ($2.1 million in 2025 USD) by order of Secretary of War Edwin M. Stanton for information leading to the arrest of Booth and his accomplices, and Federal troops were dispatched to search southern Maryland extensively, following tips reported by Federal intelligence agents to Colonel Lafayette C. Baker.

Booth's escape route

Federal troops combed the rural area's woods and swamps for Booth in the days following the assassination, as the nation experienced an outpouring of grief. On April 18, mourners waited seven abreast in a mile-long line outside the White House for the public viewing of the slain president, reposing in his open walnut casket in the black-draped East Room. A cross of lilies was at the head and roses covered the coffin's lower half.

Thousands of mourners arriving on special trains jammed Washington for the next day's funeral, sleeping on hotel floors and even resorting to blankets spread outdoors on the Capitol lawn. Prominent African-American abolitionist leader and orator Frederick Douglass called the assassination an "unspeakable calamity". Great indignation was directed towards Booth as the assassin's identity was telegraphed across the nation. Newspapers called him an "accursed devil", "monster", "madman", and a "wretched fiend".

Historian Dorothy Kunhardt writes: "Almost every family who kept a photograph album on the parlor table owned a likeness of John Wilkes Booth of the famous Booth family of actors. After the assassination Northerners slid the Booth card out of their albums: some threw it away, some burned it, some crumpled it angrily." Even in the South, sorrow was expressed in some quarters. In Savannah, Georgia, the mayor and city council addressed a vast throng at an outdoor gathering to express their indignation, and many in the crowd wept. Confederate general Joseph E. Johnston called Booth's act "a disgrace to the age". Robert E. Lee also expressed regret at Lincoln's death by Booth's hand.

Not all were grief-stricken. In New York City, a man was attacked by an enraged crowd when he shouted, "It served Old Abe right!" after hearing the news of Lincoln's death. Elsewhere in the South, Lincoln was hated in death as in life, and Booth was viewed as a hero as many rejoiced at news of his deed. Other Southerners feared that a vengeful North would exact a terrible retribution upon the defeated former Confederate states. "Instead of being a great Southern hero, his deed was considered the worst possible tragedy that could have befallen the South as well as the North", writes Kunhardt.

Booth continued hiding in the Maryland woods, waiting for an opportunity to cross the Potomac River into Virginia. He read the accounts of national mourning reported in the newspapers brought to him by Jones each day. By April 20, he was aware that some of his co-conspirators had already been arrested: Mary Surratt, Powell (or Paine), Arnold, and O'Laughlen. Booth was surprised to find little public sympathy for his action, especially from those anti-Lincoln newspapers that had previously excoriated the president in life. News of the assassination reached the far corners of the nation, and indignation was aroused against Lincoln's critics, whom many blamed for encouraging Booth to act. The San Francisco Chronicle editorialized:

Booth has simply carried out what...secession politicians and journalists have been for years expressing in words...who have denounced the President as a "tyrant," a "despot," a "usurper," hinted at, and virtually recommended.

Booth wrote of his dismay in a journal entry on April 21, as he awaited nightfall before crossing the Potomac River into Virginia:

For six months we had worked to capture. But our cause being almost lost, something decisive and great must be done. I struck boldly, and not as the papers say. I can never repent it, though we hated to kill.

That same day, the nine-car funeral train bearing Lincoln's body departed Washington on the Baltimore and Ohio Railroad, arriving at Baltimore's Camden Station at 10 am, the first stop on a 13-day journey to Springfield, Illinois, its final destination. The funeral train slowly made its way westward through seven states, stopping en route at Harrisburg, Philadelphia, Trenton, New York, Albany, Buffalo, Cleveland, Columbus, Cincinnati, and Indianapolis during the following days. About 7 million people lined the railroad tracks along the 1,662-mile (2,675 km) route, holding aloft signs with legends such as "We mourn our loss", "He lives in the hearts of his people", and "[t]he darkest hour in history".

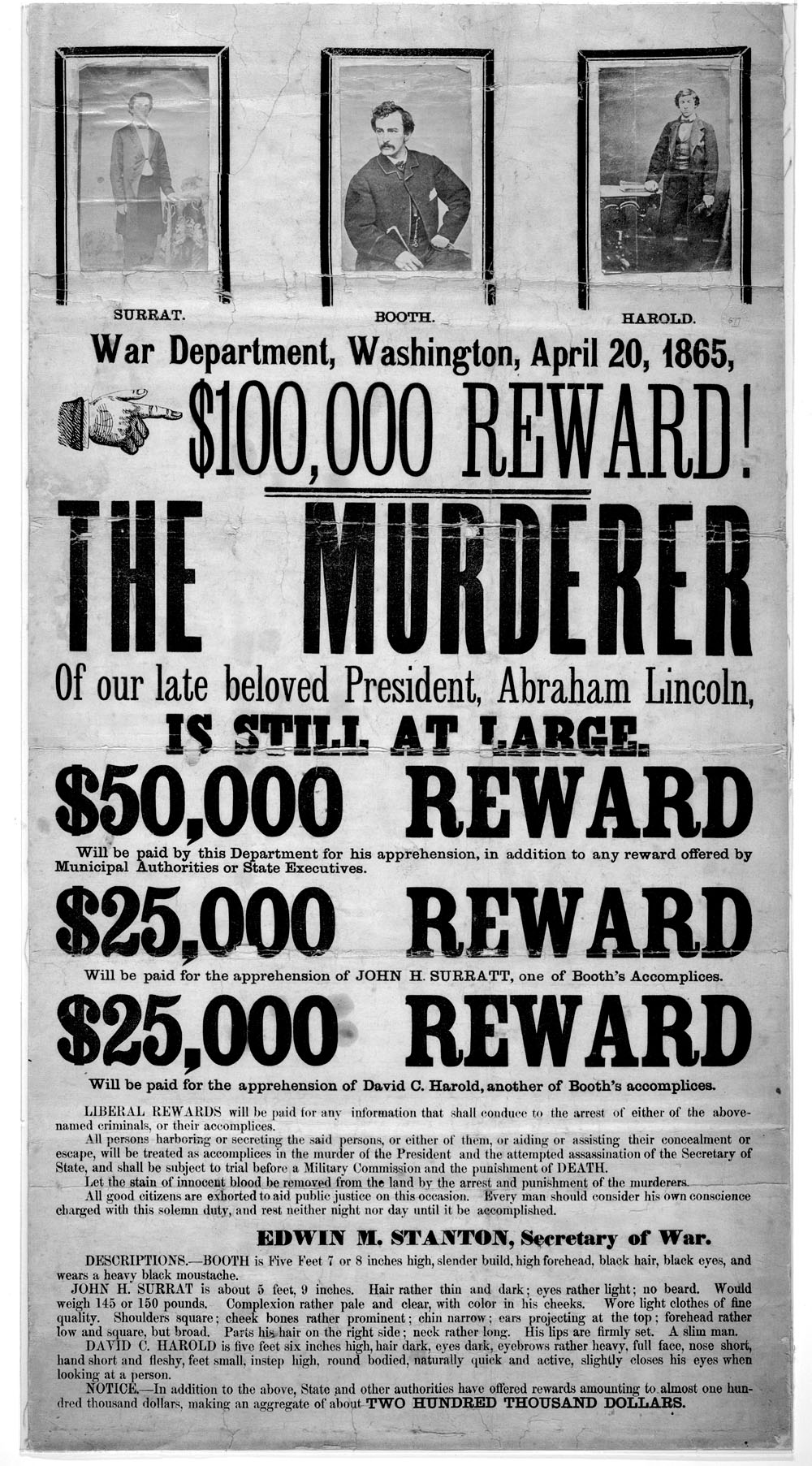
Broadside advertising reward for capture of Lincoln assassination conspirators, illustrated with photographic prints of John Surratt, John Wilkes Booth, and David Herold

In the cities where the train stopped, 1.5 million people viewed Lincoln in his coffin. Aboard the train was Chauncey Depew, a New York politician and later president of the New York Central Railroad, who said, "As we sped over the rails at night, the scene was the most pathetic ever witnessed. At every crossroads the glare of innumerable torches illuminated the whole population, kneeling on the ground." Dorothy Kunhardt called the funeral train's journey "the mightiest outpouring of national grief the world had yet seen."

Mourners were viewing Lincoln's remains when the funeral train steamed into Harrisburg at 8:20 pm, while Booth and Herold were provided with a boat and compass by Jones to cross the Potomac at night on April 21. Instead of reaching Virginia, they mistakenly navigated upriver to a bend in the broad Potomac River, coming ashore again in Maryland on April 22. The 23-year-old Herold knew the area well, having frequently hunted there, and recognized a nearby farm as belonging to a Confederate sympathizer. The farmer led them to his son-in-law, Col. John J. Hughes, who provided the fugitives with food and a hideout until nightfall, for a second attempt to row across the river to Virginia. Booth wrote in his diary:

With every man's hand against me, I am here in despair. And why; For doing what Brutus was honored for... And yet I for striking down a greater tyrant than they ever knew am looked upon as a common cutthroat.

The pair finally reached the Virginia shore near Machodoc Creek before dawn on April 23. There, they made contact with Thomas Harbin, whom Booth had previously brought into his erstwhile kidnapping plot. Harbin took Booth and Herold to another Confederate agent in the area named William Bryant who supplied them with horses.

While Lincoln's funeral train was in New York City on April 24, Lieutenant Edward P. Doherty was dispatched from Washington at 2 p.m. with a detachment of 26 Union soldiers from the 16th New York Cavalry Regiment to capture Booth in Virginia, accompanied by Lieutenant Colonel Everton Conger, an intelligence officer assigned by Lafayette Baker. The detachment steamed 70 miles (113 km) down the Potomac River on the boat John S. Ide, landing at Belle Plain, Virginia, at 10 pm.

The pursuers crossed the Rappahannock River and tracked Booth and Herold to Richard H. Garrett's farm, about 2 miles (3 km) south of Port Royal, Virginia. Booth and Herold had been led to the farm on April 24 by William S. Jett, a former private in the 9th Virginia Cavalry, whom they had met before crossing the Rappahannock. The Garretts were unaware of Lincoln's assassination; Booth was introduced to them as "James W. Boyd", a Confederate soldier, they were told, who had been wounded in the Siege of Petersburg and was returning home.

Garrett's 11-year-old son Richard was an eyewitness to the event. In later years, he became a Baptist minister and widely lectured on the events of Booth's demise at his family's farm. In 1921, Garrett's lecture was published in the Confederate Veteran as the "True Story of the Capture of John Wilkes Booth."

According to his account, Booth and Herold arrived at the Garretts' farm, located on the road close to Bowling Green, around 3 p.m. on Monday afternoon. Confederate mail delivery had ceased with the collapse of the Confederacy, he explained, so the Garretts were unaware of Lincoln's assassination. After having dinner with the Garretts that evening, Booth learned of the surrender of Johnston's army, the last Confederate armed force of any size. Its capitulation meant that the Civil War was unquestionably over and Booth's attempt to save the Confederacy by Lincoln's assassination had failed. The Garretts also finally learned of Lincoln's death and the substantial reward for Booth's capture.

Booth, said Garrett, displayed no reaction other than to ask if the family would turn in the fugitive should they have the opportunity. Still not aware of their guest's true identity, one of the older Garrett sons offered that they might, if only because they needed the money. The next day, Booth told the Garretts that he intended to reach Mexico, drawing a route on a map. Biographer Theodore Roscoe said of Garrett's account, "Almost nothing written or testified in respect to the doings of the fugitives at Garrett's farm can be taken at face value. Nobody knows exactly what Booth said to the Garretts, or they to him."

== Death ==
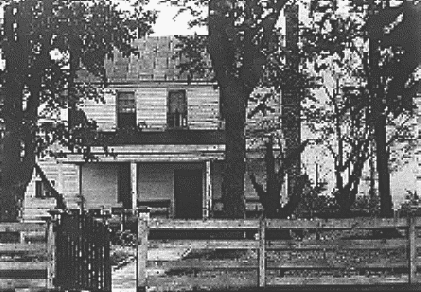
The porch of the Garrett farmhouse, where Booth died in 1865

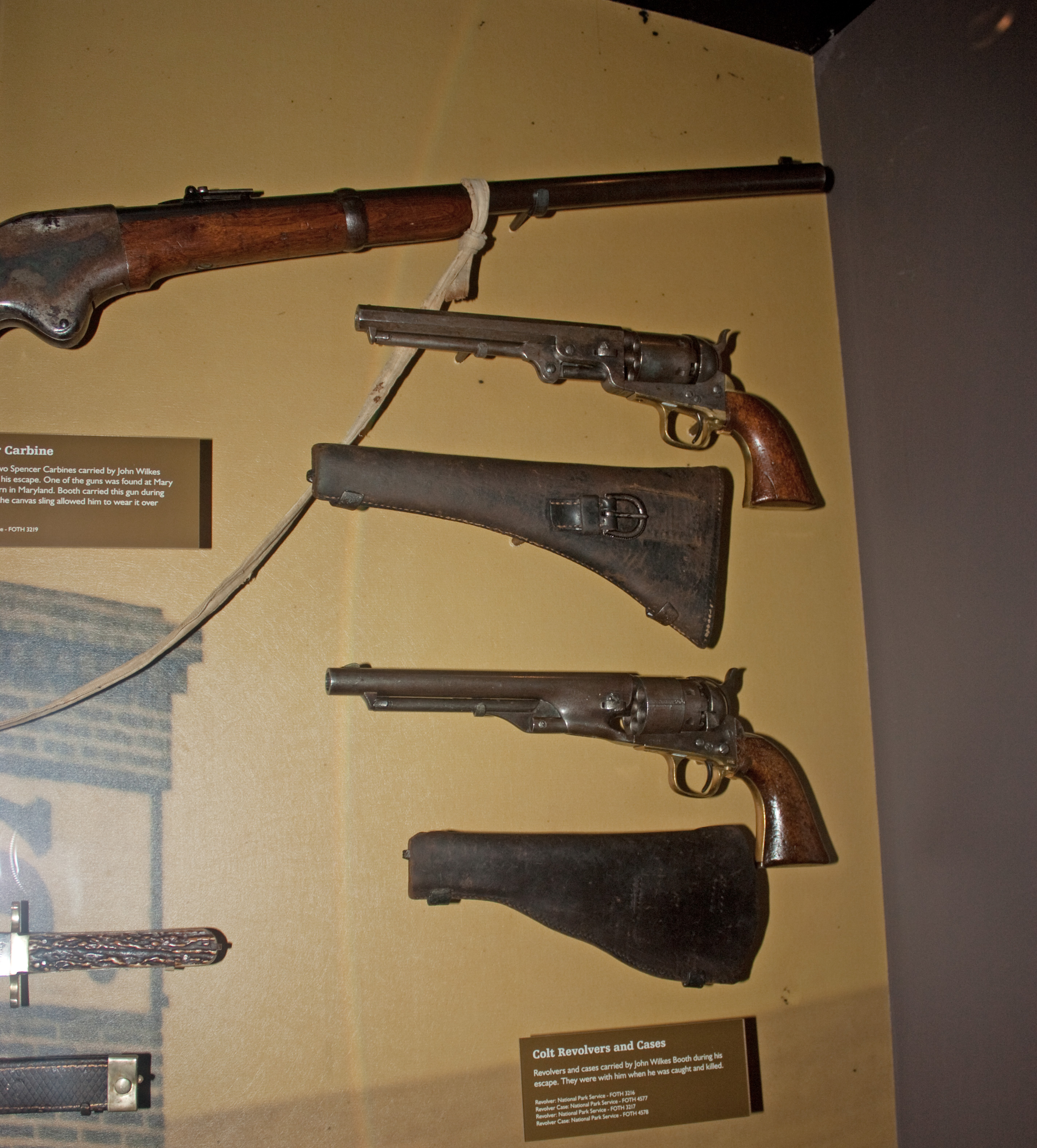
The guns in Booth's possession when he was captured, Ford's Theatre National Historic Site (2011)

Conger tracked down Jett and interrogated him, learning of Booth's location at the Garrett farm. Before dawn on April 26, the soldiers caught up with the fugitives, who were hiding in Garrett's tobacco barn. David Herold surrendered, but Booth refused Conger's demand to surrender, saying, "I prefer to come out and fight." The soldiers then set the barn on fire. As Booth moved about inside the blazing barn, Sergeant Boston Corbett shot him.

According to Corbett's later account, he fired at Booth because the fugitive "raised his pistol to shoot" at them. Conger's report to Stanton stated that Corbett shot Booth "without order, pretext or excuse", and recommended that Corbett be punished for disobeying orders to take Booth alive.

Booth, fatally wounded in the neck, was dragged from the barn to the porch of Garrett's farmhouse, where he died three hours later, aged 26. The bullet had pierced three vertebrae and partially severed his spinal cord, paralyzing him. In his dying moments, he reportedly whispered, "Tell my mother I died for my country." Asking that his hands be raised to his face so that he could see them, Booth uttered his last words, "Useless, useless", and as dawn was breaking he died of asphyxiation as a result of his wounds.

In Booth's pockets were found a compass, a candle, pictures of five women (actresses Alice Grey, Helen Western, Effie Germon, Fannie Brown, and Booth's fiancée Lucy Hale), and his diary, where he had written of Lincoln's death, "Our country owed all her troubles to him, and God simply made me the instrument of his punishment."

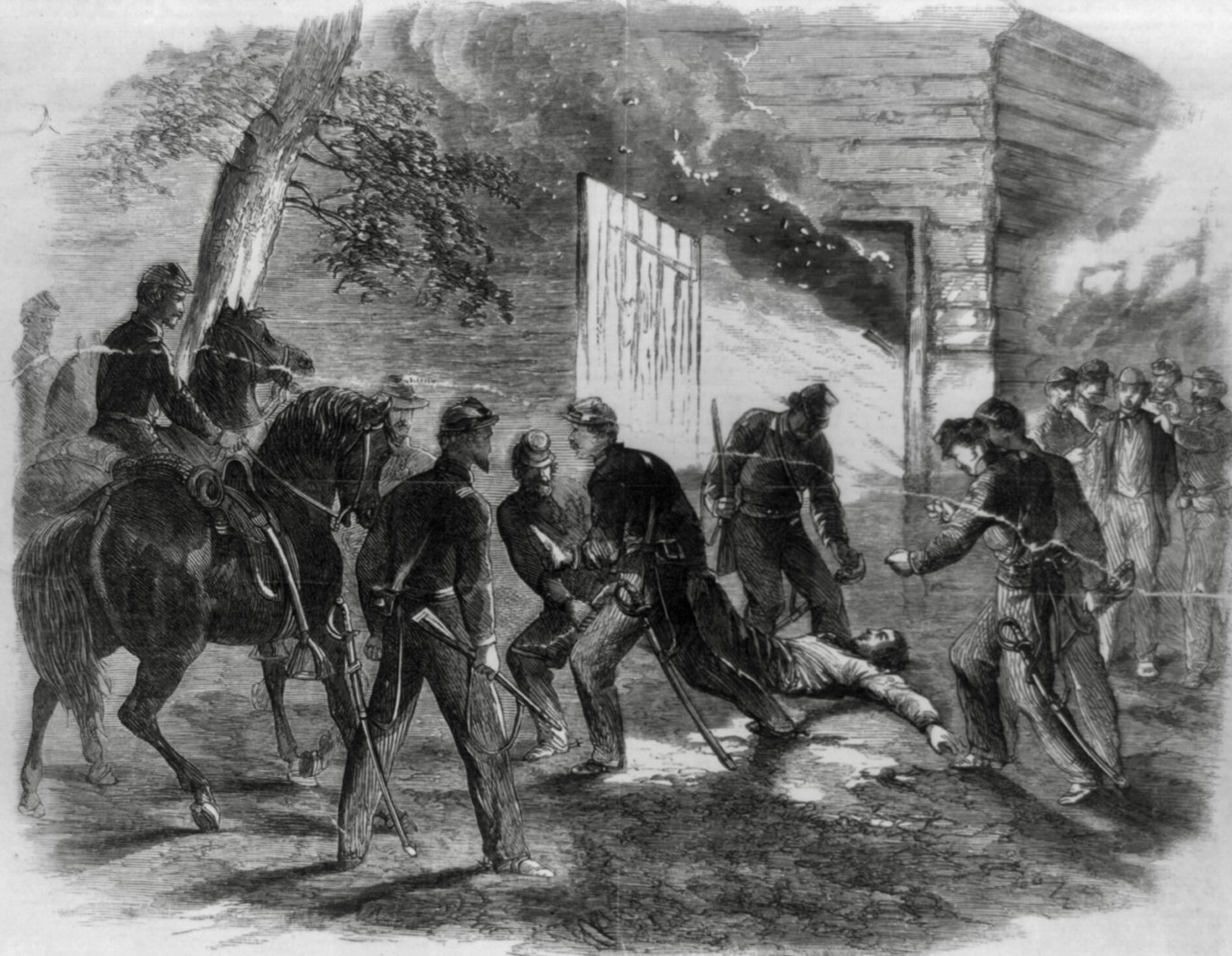
"The killing of Booth, the assassin—the dying murderer drawn from the barn where he had taken refuge, on Garrett's farm, near Port Royal, Va., April 26, 1865" (Frank Leslie's Illustrated News)

Shortly after Booth's death, his brother Edwin wrote to his sister Asia, "Think no more of him as your brother; he is dead to us now, as he soon must be to all the world, but imagine the boy you loved to be in that better part of his spirit, in another world." Asia also had in her possession a sealed letter that Booth had given her in January 1865 for safekeeping, only to be opened upon his death. In the letter, Booth had written:

I know how foolish I shall be deemed for undertaking such a step as this, where, on one side, I have many friends and everything to make me happy ... to give up all ... seems insane; but God is my judge. I love justice more than I do a country that disowns it, more than fame or wealth.

Booth's letter was seized by Federal troops, along with other family papers at Asia's house, and published by The New York Times while the manhunt was still underway. It explained his reasons for plotting against Lincoln. In it he decried Lincoln's war policy as one of "total annihilation", and said:

I have ever held the South was right. The very nomination of Abraham Lincoln, four years ago, spoke plainly war upon Southern rights and institutions. ...And looking upon African Slavery from the same stand-point held by the noble framers of our constitution, I for one, have ever considered it one of the greatest blessings (both for themselves and us,) that God has ever bestowed upon a favored nation. ...I have also studied hard to discover upon what grounds the right of a State to secede has been denied, when our very name, United States, and the Declaration of Independence, both provide for secession.

== Aftermath ==
Harper's Weekly drawing showing autopsy of John Wilkes Booth on USS Montauk. (Based on a lost Alexander Gardner photograph [?]).

Booth's body was shrouded in a blanket and tied to the side of an old farm wagon for the trip back to Belle Plain. There, his corpse was taken aboard the ironclad USS Montauk and brought to the Washington Navy Yard for identification and an autopsy. The body was identified there as Booth by more than ten people who knew him. Among the identifying features used to make sure that the man that was killed was Booth was a tattoo on his left hand with his initials J.W.B., and a distinct scar on the back of his neck.

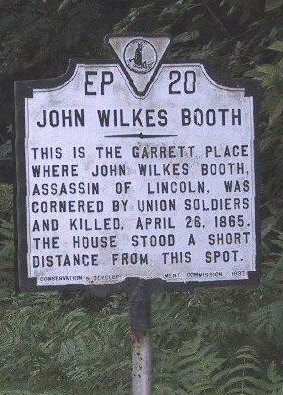
The Historic Site marker on U.S. Route 301 near Port Royal, where the Garrett barn and farmhouse once stood in what is now the highway's median (2007)

Three vertebrae were removed during the autopsy to enable physicians to remove the bullet. These bones were later put on display at the National Museum of Health and Medicine in Washington, D.C. The body was then buried in a storage room at the Arsenal Penitentiary in 1865, and later moved to a warehouse at the Washington Arsenal on October 1, 1867. In 1869, the remains were once again identified before being released to the Booth family, where they were buried in the family plot at Green Mount Cemetery in Baltimore, after a burial ceremony conducted by Fleming James, minister of Christ Episcopal Church, in the presence of more than 40 people. Russell Conwell visited homes in the vanquished former Confederate states during this time, and he found that hatred of Lincoln still smoldered. "Photographs of Wilkes Booth, with the last words of great martyrs printed upon its borders...adorn their drawing rooms".

Eight others implicated in Lincoln's assassination were tried by a military tribunal in Washington, D.C., and found guilty on June 30, 1865. Mary Surratt, Lewis Powell, David Herold, and George Atzerodt were hanged in the Old Arsenal Penitentiary on July 7, 1865. Samuel Mudd, Samuel Arnold, and Michael O'Laughlen were sentenced to life imprisonment at Fort Jefferson in Florida's isolated Dry Tortugas. Edmund Spangler was given a six-year term in prison. O'Laughlen died in prison during a yellow fever epidemic in 1867. The others were eventually pardoned in February 1869 by President Andrew Johnson.

Forty years later, when the centenary of Lincoln's birth was celebrated in 1909, a border state official reflected on Booth's assassination of Lincoln: "Confederate veterans held public services and gave public expression to the sentiment, that 'had Lincoln lived' the days of Reconstruction might have been softened and the era of good feeling ushered in earlier."

The majority of Northerners viewed Booth as a madman or monster who murdered the savior of the Union, while in the South, many cursed Booth for bringing upon them the harsh revenge of an incensed North instead of the reconciliation promised by Lincoln. A century later, Goodrich concluded, "For millions of people, particularly in the South, it would be decades before the impact of the Lincoln assassination began to release its terrible hold on their lives".

=== Theories of Booth's motivation ===
Author Francis Wilson was 11 years old at the time of Lincoln's assassination. He wrote an epitaph of Booth in his 1929 book John Wilkes Booth: "In the terrible deed he committed, he was actuated by no thought of monetary gain, but by a self-sacrificing, albeit wholly fanatical devotion to a cause he thought supreme." Others have seen more selfish motives, such as shame, ambition, and sibling rivalry for achievement and fame.

=== Theories of Booth's escape ===
In 1907, Finis L. Bates wrote Escape and Suicide of John Wilkes Booth, contending that a Booth look-alike was mistakenly killed at the Garrett farm while Booth eluded his pursuers. Booth, said Bates, assumed the pseudonym "John St. Helen" and settled on the Paluxy River near Glen Rose, Texas, and later moved to Granbury, Texas. He fell gravely ill and made a deathbed confession that he was the fugitive assassin, but he then recovered and fled, eventually committing suicide in 1903 in Enid, Oklahoma, under the alias "David E. George". By 1913, more than 70,000 copies of the book had been sold, and Bates exhibited St. Helen's mummified body in carnival sideshows.

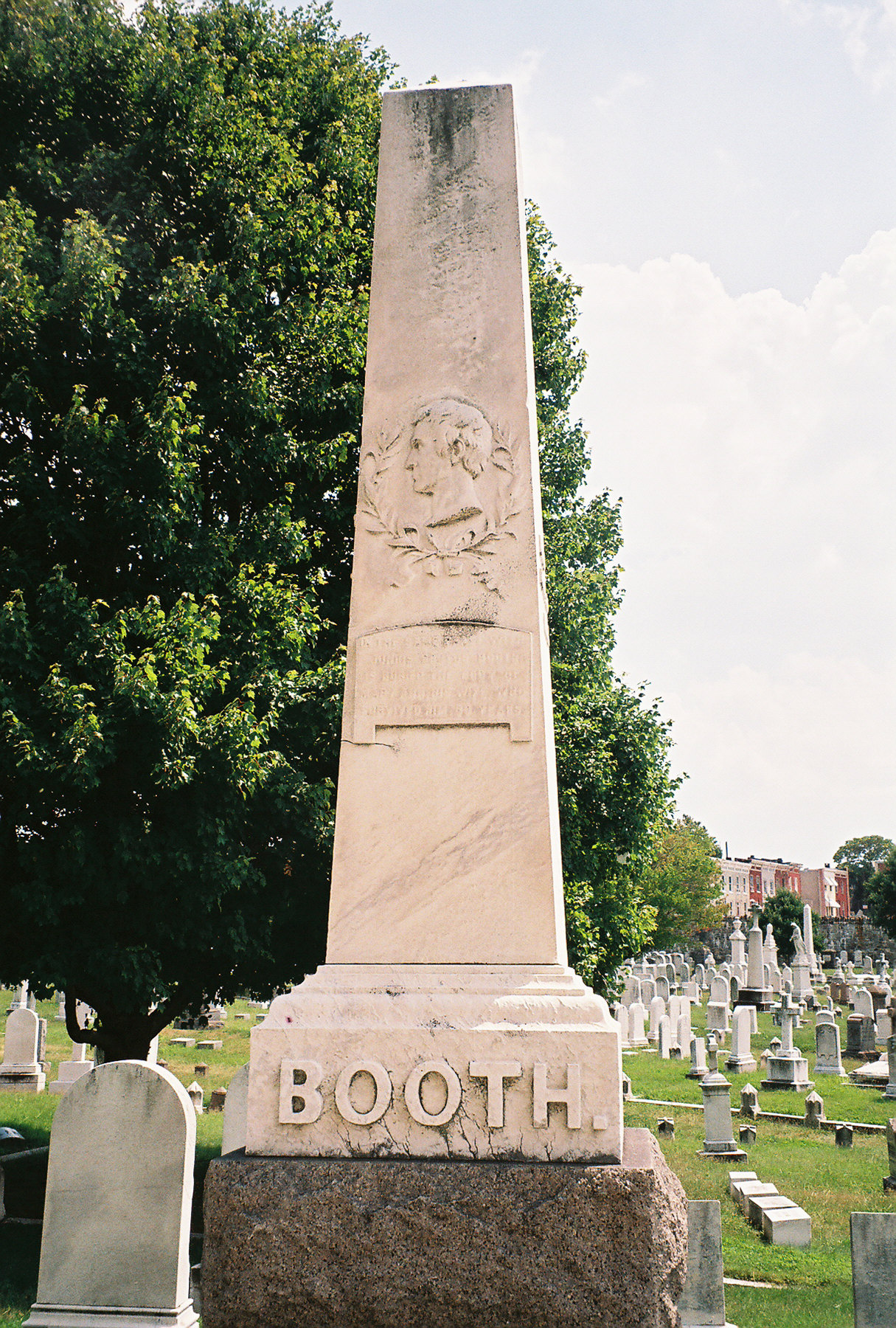
Booth Family gravesite, Green Mount Cemetery, where Booth is buried in an unmarked grave (2008)

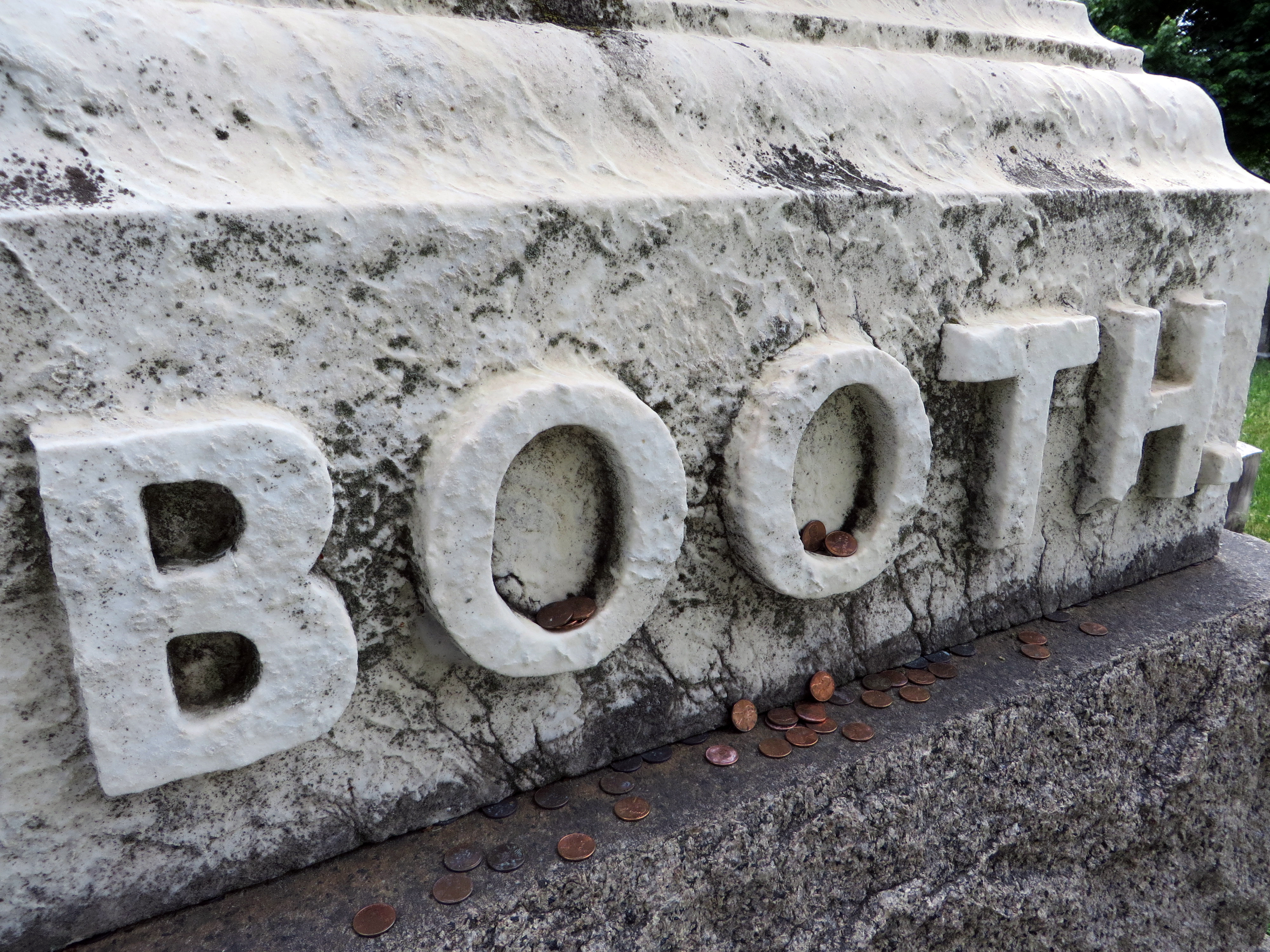
Visitors to the Booth family plot often leave pennies, which depict Lincoln on their obverse, on the large monument of Booth's father Junius

In response, the Maryland Historical Society published an account in 1913 by Baltimore mayor William M. Pegram, who had viewed Booth's remains upon the casket's arrival at the Weaver funeral home in Baltimore on February 18, 1869, for burial at Green Mount Cemetery. Pegram had known Booth well as a young man; he submitted a sworn statement that the body which he had seen in 1869 was John Wilkes Booth. Others positively identified this body as Booth at the funeral home, including Booth's mother, brother, and sister, along with his dentist and other Baltimore acquaintances.

In 1911, The New York Times had published an account by their reporter detailing the burial of Booth's body at the cemetery and those who were witnesses. The rumor was periodically revived. For instance, in the 1920s, when a corpse was exhibited on a national tour by a carnival promoter and advertised as the "Man Who Shot Lincoln". According to a 1938 article in the Saturday Evening Post, the exhibitor said that he obtained St. Helen's corpse from Bates' widow.

The Lincoln Conspiracy (1977) contended that there was a government plot to conceal Booth's escape, reviving interest in the story and prompting the display of St. Helen's mummified body in Chicago that year. The book sold more than one million copies and was made into a feature film called The Lincoln Conspiracy which was theatrically released later that year. The 1998 book The Curse of Cain: The Untold Story of John Wilkes Booth contended that Booth had escaped, sought refuge in Japan, and eventually returned to the United States.

In 1994, two historians together with several descendants, sought a court order for the exhumation of Booth's body at Green Mount Cemetery which was, according to their lawyer, "intended to prove or disprove longstanding theories on Booth's escape" by conducting a photo-superimposition analysis.

The application was blocked by Baltimore Circuit Court Judge Joseph H. H. Kaplan, who cited, among other things, "the unreliability of petitioners' less-than-convincing escape/cover-up theory" as a major factor in his decision. The Maryland Court of Special Appeals upheld the ruling.

In December 2010, descendants of Edwin Booth reported that they obtained permission to exhume the Shakespearean actor's body to obtain DNA samples to compare with a sample of his brother John's DNA to refute the rumor that John had escaped after the assassination. Bree Harvey, a spokesman from the Mount Auburn Cemetery in Cambridge, Massachusetts, where Edwin Booth is buried, denied reports that the family had contacted them and requested to exhume Edwin's body. The family hoped to obtain samples of John Wilkes's DNA from remains such as vertebrae stored at the National Museum of Health and Medicine in Maryland. On March 30, 2013, museum spokesperson Carol Johnson announced that the family's request to extract DNA from the vertebrae had been rejected.

== In popular culture ==
=== Film ===
- Booth was portrayed by Raoul Walsh in the 1915 film The Birth of a Nation.
- He was played by Ian Keith in D. W. Griffith's early sound film Abraham Lincoln (1930).
- John Wilkes Booth was played by John Derek in the film Prince of Players (1955), a biography of Edwin Booth (played by Richard Burton).
- Bradford Dillman played Booth in the 1977 film The Lincoln Conspiracy, based on the book with the same name speculating that Booth was the instrument of men in the government planning Lincoln's murder.
- James Marsden played Booth in a flashback cameo in the comedy Zoolander (2001).
- Chris Conner portrayed John Wilkes Booth in the director's cut of the 2003 film Gods and Generals.
- Christian Camargo depicts Booth in National Treasure: Book of Secrets (2007).
- Booth is portrayed by Toby Kebbell in the Robert Redford film The Conspirator (2010).
- Jesse Johnson plays Booth in the telefilm Killing Lincoln (2013), where he is the main character.

=== Literature ===
- In G. J. A. O'Toole's 1979 historical fiction-mystery novel The Cosgrove Report, a present-day private detective investigates the authenticity of a 19th-century manuscript that alleges Booth survived the aftermath of the Lincoln assassination. (ISBN 978-0802144072)
- In Abraham Lincoln, Vampire Hunter by Seth Grahame-Smith, Booth is transformed into a vampire a few years before the Civil War and assassinates Lincoln out of natural sympathy for the Confederate States, whose slave population provides America's vampires with an abundant source of blood.

=== Stage productions ===
- Emmy winning writer/producer/director/showrunner, Matthew Weiner wrote a biographic play: John Wilkes Booth: One Night Only. It had its world premiere in May 2025 at Baltimore Center Stage, which is about a mile from Greenmount Cemetery where Booth was buried. Booth grew up in and around Baltimore, as did Weiner.
- Booth is featured as a central character of Stephen Sondheim's musical Assassins, in which his assassination of Lincoln is depicted in a musical number called "The Ballad of Booth".
- Austin-based theatre company The Hidden Room developed a staged reading of John Wilkes Booth's Richard III based on the manuscript promptbook in the collection of the Harry Ransom Center. The promptbook is one of only two known surviving promptbooks created by John Wilkes Booth and uses the Colley Cibber adaptation of Shakespeare's text. The full book with the actor's handwritten notations has been digitized. The other promptbook is also for Richard III and can be found in the Harvard Theatre Collection.

=== Television ===
- Jack Lemmon played Booth live onstage in the sixth Ford Star Jubilee episode "The Day Lincoln Was Shot" (1956).
- The Wagon Train episode "The John Wilbot Story" (1958) is based on the premise that Booth survived and moved west; the character John Wilbot is played by Dane Clark.
- Booth was portrayed by John Lasell in The Twilight Zone episode "Back There" (1961).
- All three Booth brothers interact with the Morehouses and with Elizabeth in New York City in episode 9 of season 1 ("A Day to Give Thanks") of the BBC America series Copper.
- Booth was portrayed by Kelly Blatz in "The Assassination of Abraham Lincoln" episode (S01E02) of Timeless.
- In the early 1990s, an episode of the American TV show, Unsolved Mysteries, presented originally by Robert Stack, examined sympathetically the theory that John Wilkes Booth was not killed in Maryland but escaped, dying in Oklahoma in 1903. The episode was re-edited and hosted by Dennis Farina in 2009.
- Booth was played by Rob Morrow in a 1998 remake of the television film The Day Lincoln Was Shot.
- In the television series, Bones, the main character, Seeley Booth is a direct descendant of John Wilkes Booth; however, this is historically inaccurate, as the assassin died childless at the age of 26 just days after killing Abraham Lincoln.
- Booth appears as a character in the iCarly episode “iHalfoween” (Season 6, Episode 4), where he is played by actor Guilford Adams.
- In the 2019 web television series Blame the Hero, Booth is portrayed by Anthony Padilla. In the series, multiple time travelers prevent Booth from killing President Lincoln.
- Booth's shooting of Lincoln is depicted in the miniseries Grant (2020) and Abraham Lincoln (2022).'
- In the 2024 Apple TV+ miniseries Manhunt, John Wilkes Booth is portrayed by Anthony Boyle.

=== Music ===
- "John Wilkes Booth" is a song written by Mary Chapin Carpenter, commissioned and interpreted by Tony Rice. The song is included on his recording Native American.

== See also ==
- Charles J. Guiteau, assassin of President James A. Garfield
- Leon Czolgosz, assassin of President William McKinley
- Lee Harvey Oswald, assassin of President John F. Kennedy
