= George Kunkel (theatre manager) =

American theatre manager and minstrel show performer (1823–1885)

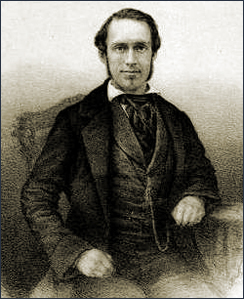
1853 lithograph of George Kunkel

George Kunkel (January 21, 1823 – January 25, 1885) was an American theatre manager, impresario, actor, singer-songwriter, and playwright. His son, George Kunkel, was also an entertainer who worked as an opera singer and a silent film and stage actor. His daughter was the soprano Marie Kunkel Zimmerman.

As an entertainer, George Kunkel was a leading performer in minstrel shows of the 19th century, and was particularly associated with the role of Uncle Tom; a character he portrayed in blackface. After initially working as a printer in Philadelphia, he began his stage career in 1844 performing with the Virginia Serenaders. A talented bass vocalist, he wrote many of his own songs as well as music for other minstrel entertainers. In 1853 he established his own traveling minstrel show, Kunkel's Nightingale Serenaders (later known as George Kunkel's Nightingale Minstrels), the performance and personnel aspects of which he managed, with John T. Ford serving as the group's business manager. With Ford and Thomas L. Moxley (died 1890) as his occasional partners, he became a prominent theatre manager of the mid 19th century. Some of the theatres he managed included the National Theatre in Washington, D.C., the Richmond Theatre, and multiple theaters in Baltimore.

== Early life and career ==
George Kunkel was born in Greencastle, Pennsylvania, on January 21, 1823. The son of Jacob Kunkel and Rebecca Kunkel (née Stine), he initially trained as a printer in the city of Philadelphia. His cousin was the Pennsylvania politician John Christian Kunkel.

In 1844 he abandoned his career as a printer in Philadelphia to join the company of the Virginia Serenaders; a minstrel show that was then in residence at the Chestnut Street Theatre in Philadelphia. He continued to perform with this troupe until it disbanded in the early 1850s. The troupe contained several well-known blackface entertainers of the period, among them Cool White, Jim Sanford, Tony Winnemore, and Eph Horn.

== Kunkel's Nightingales ==
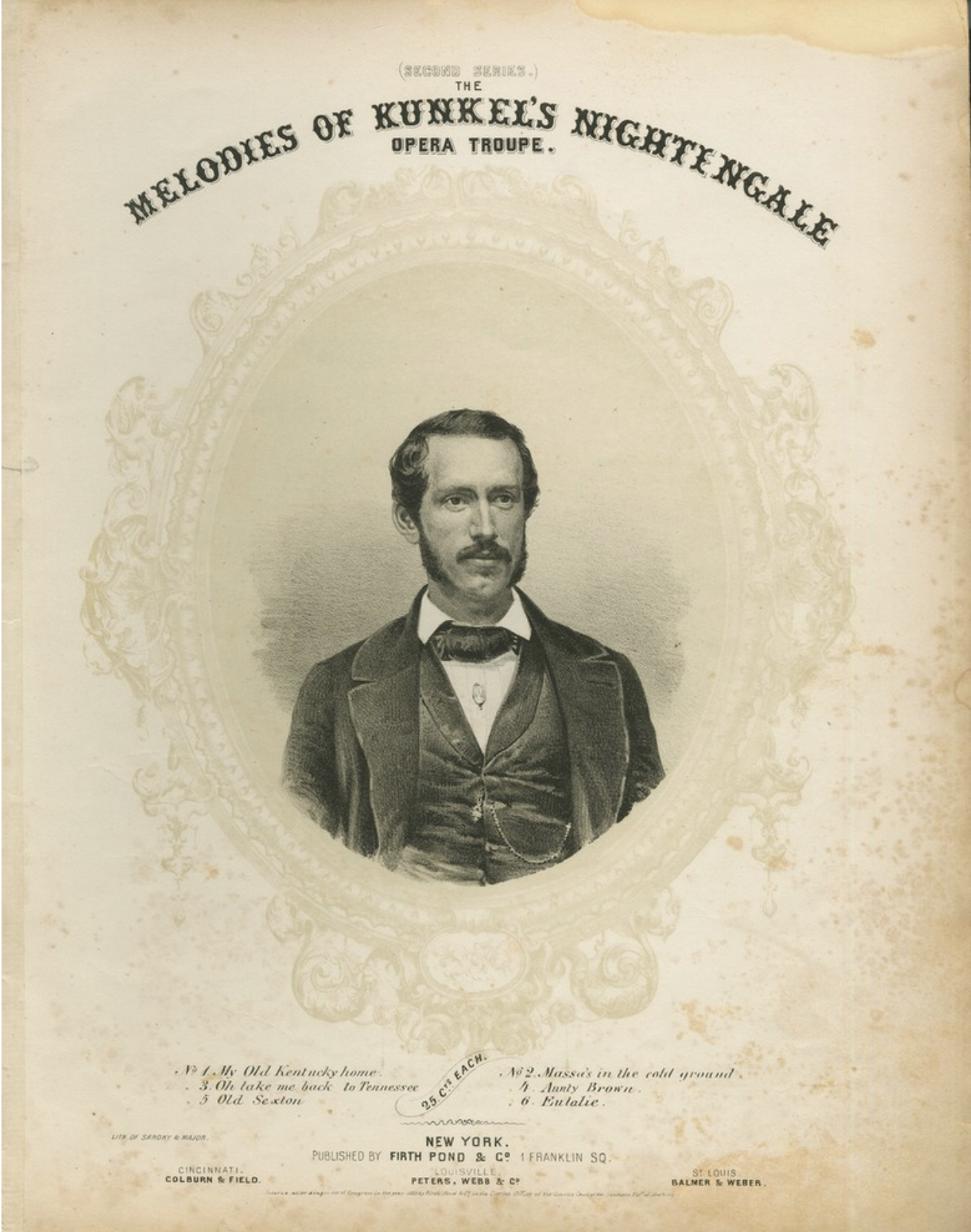
Front cover of 1853 sheet music for The Melodies of Kunkel's Nightingale Opera Troupe

In 1853 Kunkel founded his own traveling minstrel show, Kunkel's Nightingale Serenaders; a troupe sometimes also billed as Kunkel's Nightingale Opera Troupe and Kunkel's Ethiopian Nightingales. This group became one of the leading minstrel shows on the American stage during the mid-1850s. It temporarily disbanded in 1856, but was reformed as Kunkel's Nightingales in 1861 when it resumed performances. The revived troupe began performing at the Baltimore Museum Theatre where Kunkel had taken a post as manager a few months after the beginning of the American Civil War. The troupe was later active at the Front Street Theatre in Baltimore after Kunkel was appointed manager of that theatre in 1864. It remained active through 1866. John T. Ford served as the business manager of Kunkel's minstrel show, with Kunkel overseeing the personnel, theatrical and musical content, and coordinating all aspects of the performances.

Kunkel also starred in the minstrel shows as a singer and actor. One of the songs he performed with the Nightingales, "Susette and Beau Joe" by Martin and Glover, is in the collection of the Library of Congress. He also wrote many of his own songs as well as music for other minstrel entertainers. One of his more successful tunes was the 1853 hit "Maryland, My Home".

== Theatre management with Ford and Moxley ==
In 1855 Kunkel joined with John T. Ford and Thomas L. Moxley to form a theatre management firm. The trio jointly managed multiple theaters in Baltimore, Richmond, and Washington, D.C. This included the National Theatre in Washington, D.C., which they managed in the mid-1850s until its destruction by fire on February 7, 1857. In recalling the fire in an 1884 interview, Kunkel referred to the National as the Jenny Lind Theatre. Soprano Jenny Lind sang at the grand re-opening of the National Theatre in 1850 after the National's earlier structure had also been destroyed by fire earlier that year.

In 1856 the team of Kunkel, Ford, and Moxley (died 1890) took over as managers of the Richmond Theatre (then known as the Marshall Theatre) in Virginia; the leading performance venue in that city. Ford exited the partnership a few years later, but Kunkel and Moxley continued as managers of the theatre until the spring of 1861 with the outbreak of the American Civil War. Unfamiliar with staging serious dramas such as the plays of William Shakespeare, Kunkel and his partners hired the actor Joseph Jefferson to be their stage manager to assist them in doing a credible job with legitimate theatre. They hired several prominent actors of the period to star in productions, among them actress Charlotte Cushman and actors Edwin Forrest, John Drew, and brothers Edwin and John Wilkes Booth.

John Wilkes Booth, who later assassinated U.S. president Abraham Lincoln on April 14, 1865, at Ford's Theatre (established and managed by the aforementioned John T. Ford), joined the permanent company of players at the Marshall Theatre in 1858 while Kunkel and Moxley were in charge. He remained there for two years, and had a particular success at the theatre as Shakespeare's Richard III. His older brother Edwin had been performing on the Richmond stage since 1856; often playing the title roles in tragedies like King Lear and Henry V. Together, the Booth brothers starred in several Shakespeare plays at the Marshall Theatre during Kunkel's tenure, among them Hamlet with Edwin in the title role and John Wilkes as Horatio.

== Later life and career ==
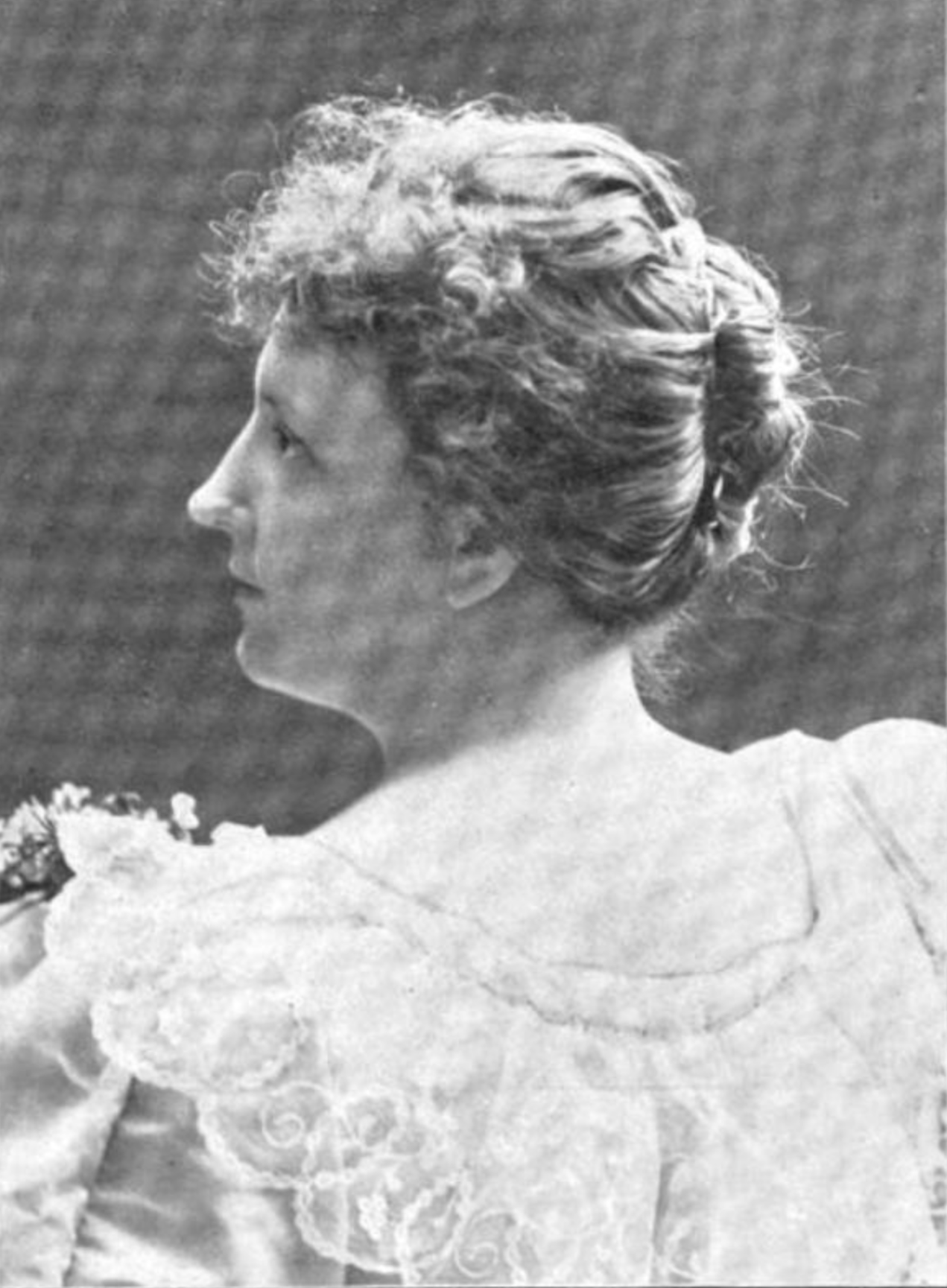
George's daughter, the soprano Marie Kunkel Zimmerman

In 1864 Kunkel married the actress Ada Proctor who was one of the stars in Kunkel's Nightingale at the Front Street Theatre in Baltimore. The couple had two children, George Kunkel Jr. and Mamie Kunkel. Their daughter, Mamie was also a singer, and their son George became a silent film star, comedic stage actor, and operatic baritone. After her marriage, soprano Mamie Kunkel was known on the concert and oratorio stage as Marie Kunkel Zimmerman.

By the time of his marriage, Kunkel had achieved fame in the role of Uncle Tom based on the character from Harriet Beecher Stowe's novel Uncle Tom's Cabin. He first performed this role with Kunkel's Nightingale while they were on tour to Charleston, South Carolina, in 1861, the year the American Civil War began. He subsequently toured throughout the United States in the part. He became closely associated with the role both on the national stage in the United States and also in England; performing the part on a tour to the latter nation in 1883. He performed the part with frequency for decades, with his last performance of the role being in early January 1885 less than a month before his death.

Kunkel's portrayal of Uncle Tom changed throughout his lifetime. Originally a pro-slavery advocate, Kunkel's original presentation of Uncle Tom's Cabin was an unfaithful adaptation of the novel, heavily revised to present a tale that appealed to the Confederate South. In this altered version, rather than dying as a Christ-like figure to save two runaway slaves, Uncle Tom was a weak and submissive figure who willingly returned to slavery to resume being happy. However, by the mid-1870s Kunkel's portrayal had undergone a complete reversal, which reflected the actor's own changing views on slavery. This version was entirely anti-slavery and, in it, Kunkel made the character highly sympathetic, virtuous, dignified, and sharply intelligent with a quality of manly strength often missing in the submissive portrayals of other adaptations. This portrayal had the effect of disturbing many proponents of Jim Crow for its unflinchingly harsh portrayal of the brutality of slave owners, and its elevated portrayal of a black man which emphasized the injustice of slavery. One Southern critic wrote of Kunkel's performance in an 1881 review,

The individual who took the part of Uncle Tom had no more conception of the negro character than an Esquimax [sic] (Eskimo) would have. Anyone from the South would have been amused at his idea of the old-fashioned negro character. Instead of the simple, credulous, and true style of the old time darky, he tried to make the character similar to Richelieu, Virginius, Lear, Spartacus, and Brutus as played by Booth, McCullough, and Barrett.

In his later years, Kunkel was associated with Henry Russell's song "The Old Sexton"; a work he performed frequently on the stage. He died in Baltimore, Maryland, on January 25, 1885, after collapsing while taking tea with his wife and their two children, dying in the arms of his son. He is buried in Baltimore Cemetery at 2500 E. North Avenue, Baltimore, MD 21213. A benefit performance to raise money to support the Kunkel family was given at Ford's Grand Opera House by the McCaull Comic Opera Company in conjunction with the theatre troupes of the Holliday Street Theater, the Monumental Theatre, and the Front Street Theatre.

== Selected works ==
=== Songs ===
- "Ole Clem: A Celebrated Ethiopian Song" (1848), dedicated to Joseph Reed Esq. of the U.S. Coast survey
- "Maryland, My Home" (1853)
- "Let Me Kiss Him for his Mother" (1859) about Yellow Fever?
- "Only Waiting" (1860)

=== Other ===
- "Kunkel's New Song Book; With Sketches of the Lives of the Principal Members of the Troupe, an Article on Ethiopian Minstrelsy, and All the New and Beautiful Songs Sung by the Nightingales · Issue 4"

== See also ==
- Coon song
