= John T. Ford =

American theatre manager

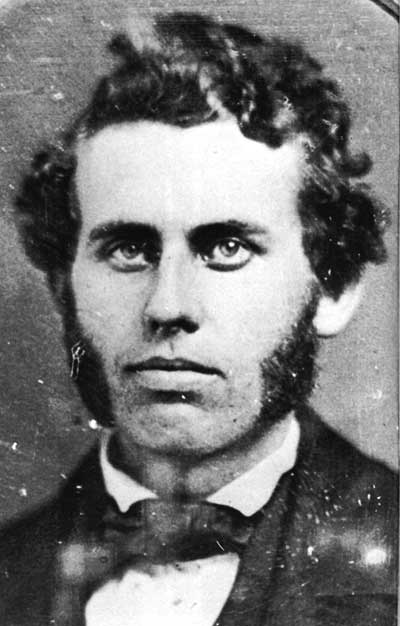
- Born: John Thompson Ford; April 16, 1829; Baltimore, Maryland, US
- Died: March 14, 1894 (aged 64); Baltimore, Maryland, US
- Occupation: Theater manager
- Years active: 1854–1890s
- Spouse: Edith
- Children: 11

John Thompson Ford (April 16, 1829 – March 14, 1894) was an American theater manager and politician during the nineteenth century. He is most notable for operating Ford's Theatre at the time of the Abraham Lincoln assassination.

== Early life ==
Ford was born in Baltimore, Maryland, and was the son of Elias and Anna (née Greanor) Ford. His ancestors were early Maryland settlers and some of them took part in the American Revolution. For a few years he attended public school in Baltimore and then became a clerk in his uncle's tobacco factory in Richmond, Virginia. Not caring for this work, he became a bookseller.

== The theatre ==
Working as a bookseller in Richmond, Ford then wrote a farce dealing with contemporary life. The farce was entitled Richmond As It Is, and was produced by a minstrel company called the Kunkel's Nightingale Serenaders. This farce was fairly successful, and George Kunkel, the owner and manager of the Serenaders, offered Ford a position with the organization. He accepted, and for several seasons traveled as business manager of this company throughout the United States and Canada.

In 1854, Ford assumed control of the Holliday Street Theater, Baltimore, which he managed for twenty-five years. In 1855 he formed a theatre management firm with Kunkel and Thomas L. Moxley. The trio jointly managed multiple theaters in Baltimore, Richmond, and Washington D.C. This included the National Theatre in Washington D.C., the Richmond Theatre (then known as the Marshall Theatre) in Virginia, and multiple theaters in Baltimore. This partnership lasted into the late 1850s, after which Ford pursued his own in interests separately.

Ford also was responsible for creating three theaters in Washington, D.C. He opened his first theatre on Tenth Street in 1861. After it was destroyed by fire the following year, he rebuilt the structure on the same site and called it Ford's Theatre. Later, he built the Ford's Grand Opera House in Baltimore in 1871.

== Political life ==
In 1858, Ford was elected President of the City Council of Baltimore, and by a force of circumstance was acting mayor for two years. He also was in the position of City Director, for one term, of the Baltimore and Ohio Railroad.

He was a Commissioner of the McDonough Fund on part of the city, and managed the old Washington theatre for a season.

== Lincoln assassination ==
Ford was the manager of this highly successful theatre at the time of the assassination of President Abraham Lincoln. He was a good friend of Lincoln's assassin John Wilkes Booth, a famous actor. Ford drew further suspicion upon himself by being in Richmond, Virginia, at the time of the assassination on April 14, 1865. Until April 2, 1865, Richmond had been the capital of the Confederate States of America and a center of anti-Lincoln conspiracies.

An order was issued for Ford's arrest and on April 18, he was arrested at his Baltimore home. His brothers James and Harry Clay Ford were thrown into prison along with him. John Ford complained of the effect that his incarceration would have on his business and family, and he offered to help with the investigation, but Secretary of War Edwin M. Stanton made no reply to his two letters. After 39 days, the brothers were finally fully exonerated and set free since there was no evidence of their complicity in the crime.

The theater was seized by the government, and Ford was paid $88,000 for it by Congress. The treatment accorded to him following the assassination made him remain bitter toward the US government for decades.

== Theatres in other cities ==
During his career, Ford also managed theaters in Alexandria, Virginia; Philadelphia, Pennsylvania; Charleston, South Carolina; and Richmond. It was at Richmond's Marshall Theatre, then under Ford's management, that in November, 1856, Edwin Booth first met Mary Devlin (playing Juliet to his Romeo), whom he later married. Joseph Jefferson was then the stage manager and a member of the company of this theater, as was Dion Boucicault. He leased Thalian Hall in Wilmington, NC from 1867–1871. Under his management the name was changed from "Wilmington Theatre" to "The Wilmington Opera House". Ford oversaw the first renovation for the theatre and continued to serve as the booking agent until 1873. Ford also managed a great number of travelling as well as resident companies, which included the greatest stars, and actors of his generation. He had a reputation for being honest and honorable in his numerous business dealings. For instance, during the H.M.S. Pinafore craze of the late 1870s, he was the only American manager who paid Gilbert and Sullivan a royalty on the opera. This action prompted the authors and their manager, Richard D'Oyly Carte, to allow Ford to produce their next opera in the United States and to entrust their American business affairs to him; and he leased the Fifth Avenue Theatre in New York City, for the production of The Pirates of Penzance in 1879-1880 and other Carte productions thereafter.

For a period of forty years, Ford was an active and prominent figure in Baltimore's civic life. He was connected with many banking and financial concerns, and his business advice was sought and relied on. He was president of the Union Railroad Company, member of the board of directors of the Baltimore and Ohio Railroad, vice president of the West Baltimore Improvement Association, and trustee of numerous philanthropic institutions. In 1858, while serving as president of the City Council, he was made acting mayor of the city of Baltimore, and he filled this position with marked ability. His winning and gracious personality won him a host of friends.

== Death ==
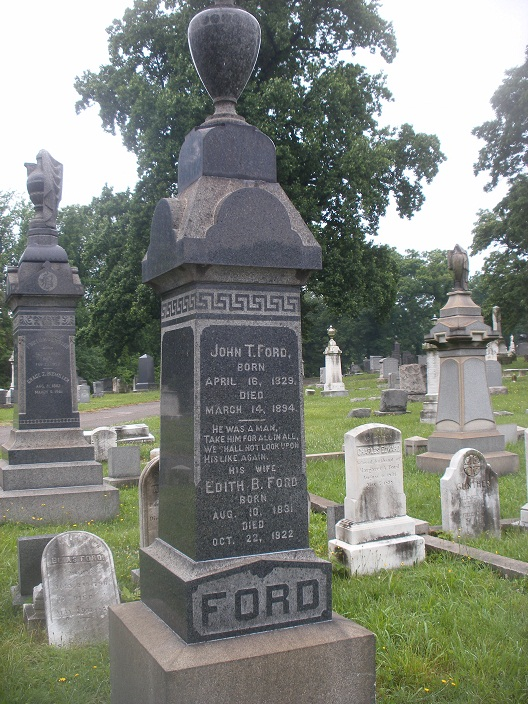
Grave monument at Loudon Park Cemetery, Baltimore

In early 1894, Ford's health declined. His death at his Baltimore home of a heart attack during a bout of influenza came suddenly. He left a widow, Edith Branch Andrew Ford, who was the mother of eleven children. Ten of these were still living when he died: Charles, then manager of Ford's Opera House; George, a treasurer; John Jr, an advertising agent; Harry; Mattie, an actor; James, and the unmarried daughters Lizzie, May, Lucy, and Saile (named after her father Elias, Saile is Elias in reverse). Two days after his death, a funeral was held at his house and officiated by two clergymen from the Central Presbyterian Church of Baltimore, and he was buried in Loudon Park Cemetery.
