= Russell Brothers (vaudeville) =

Irish-American vaudeville performers

John Russell
- Born: August 1854; New York City, U.S.
- Died: May 3, 1925 (aged 70); New York City
- Occupation: Vaudeville comedian

The Russell Brothers as "The Irish Servant Girls"

James Russell
- Born: October 1859; New York City, U.S.
- Died: January 31, 1914 (aged 54); New York City
- Occupations: Vaudeville comedian; singer; songwriter

The Russell Brothers were Irish American vaudeville entertainers, John Russell (August 1854 – May 3, 1925) and his brother James Russell (October 1859 – January 31, 1914).

== Career ==
Both brothers were born in New York to Irish immigrant parents, Isabella and Archy Russell. They started working as performers of songs, dance and comedy in emerging New York vaudeville venues in the mid-1870s. They had various acts, including blackface and acting as German immigrants, but developed a signature act cross-dressed as "The Irish Servant Girls".

The act parodied the lives of working class Irish Americans like themselves, at a time when "ethnic humor... found its way into nearly every routine. Audiences of Irish, Germans, Jews and other ethnicities flocked to the performances, despite the fact that their ethnic group would invariably come in for ridicule and parody based on widely held stereotypes. For the Irish, it was the “stage Irishman” (a drunk, lazy, happy-go-lucky fool) and the hopeless Irish maid who invariably brought disaster to her employer's home." The Russell brothers' act played on their supposed simplicity, ending with the pair abusing and hitting each other, mangling the language, and causing havoc on the stage. John Russell, who acted as the straight man of the pair, used the catchphrase "Oh, Maggie!", whenever inevitable disaster struck.

The pair performed their act successfully for almost thirty years. In the 1890s, they headed a touring unit formed by Weber and Fields. They were managed for some time by Tony Pastor, and appeared in Broadway shows, including a 1904 revue, The Female Detectives. James Russell also wrote songs, including "Where the River Shannon Flows" which the pair performed from 1905, and which was later recorded by John McCormack among others.

While remaining popular, their comedy act faced increasing criticism in the 1900s for its ethnic stereotyping, from groups including the Ancient Order of Hibernians and the United Irish Societies. In 1907, while preparing to tour with a new production, The Hired Girl’s Millions, their performance at Hammerstein's Victoria Theatre was interrupted by protesters shouting "Down with the Russell Brothers. They ridicule the honest, hardworking Irish Servant Girl." A few days later, their performance at the Orpheum Theatre in Brooklyn was again attacked by some 300 protesters, who threw potatoes and eggs at the performers. Their performances were canceled, and the touring show flopped. According to writer Kliph Nesteroff, the events around the Russell brothers' performance were an early manifestation of "culture wars" affecting comedy acts.

For a time, the brothers attempted to continue performing as "Swedish" servant girls. In about 1910, James Russell suffered a nervous breakdown and retired. He was briefly replaced in the act by Bert Savoy, but John Russell also retired soon afterwards. James died in New York in 1914 at the age of 54, and John died in the city in 1925, aged 70.
