= Holliday Street Theater =

Historical theatrical venue in Baltimore, Maryland, US

Coordinates: 39°17′27.25″N 76°36′36″W

The Holliday Street Theater also known as the New Theatre, New Holliday, Old Holliday, The Baltimore Theatre, and Old Drury, was a historical theatrical venue in Federal Period Baltimore, Maryland. It is known for showing the first performance of Francis Scott Key's "The Star-Spangled Banner".

== History ==
The New Theater on Holliday Street was founded by two business partners in 1794 and was opened to the public on September 25, 1795. The theater showcased a variety of acts, including comedy, dance, music ensembles, and opera. It also hosted a production of John Howard Payne's opera Clari in the early 1800s.

As the theater's popularity grew, management decided to demolish the existing wooden building (which was now known as Old Holliday Theater), and replace it with a new brick one. The new venue opened in May 1813 as The Baltimore, though eventually it retained its name as the Holliday Street Theater. Over time, it came to be known informally as Old Drury.

On October 19, 1814, lyrics from Francis Scott Key's poem "Defence of Fort McHenry" set to the tune of "To Anacreon in Heaven" were performed onstage at the theater; it was so enthusiastically received that the performance was repeated for several nights afterward. As the song – now known as The Star-Spangled Banner – gained in popularity, it was accompanied by an illuminated scene of the siege on Fort McHenry. The song would be adopted as the United States national anthem a century later.

The theater was shuttered in the late 1840s, and in 1854 was purchased by John T. Ford, the theater manager who would go on to operate Ford's Theatre and Ford's Grand Opera House. The Holliday Street Theater was damaged by fire in 1873; Ford rebuilt it and eventually sold it back to those from whom he had bought it. The building again fell into disrepair and was finally converted into a motion picture theater. It was demolished in 1917 to make room for the War Memorial Plaza. The site is located between the War Memorial Building and Baltimore City Hall.
