= Kate Reignolds =

English-American actress (1836–1911)

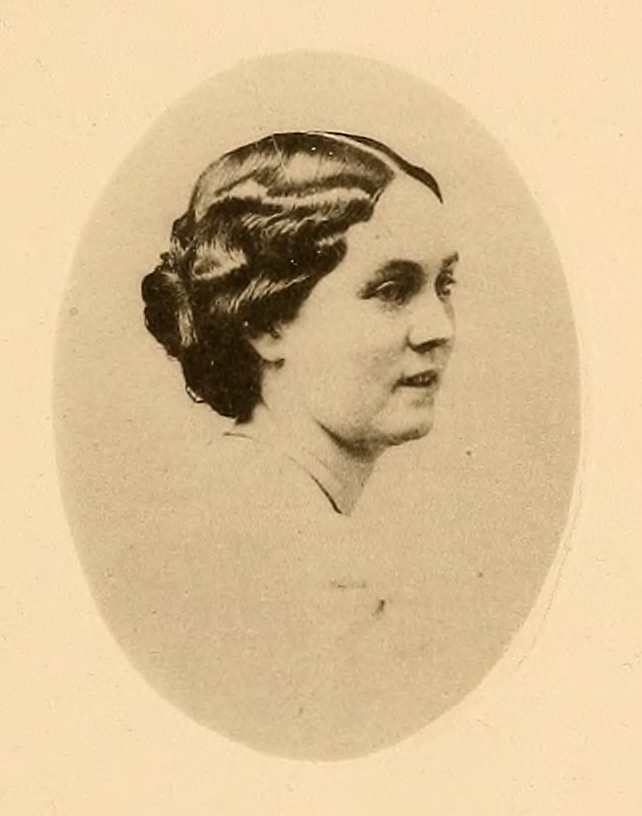
Oval photographic portrait (by 1887)

Catherine Mary Reignolds-Winslow (née Reignolds; 1836–1911), often called Kate, and billed under her maiden name, was an English-American stage actress. She performed at the Broadway Theatre, the Chambers Street Theatre and Laura Keene's Theatre in New York City, and elsewhere.

== Life and career ==
She was an Englishwoman by birth; her mother was Emma Reignolds (née Absolon), and her father was Robert Reignolds, son of Major Thomas Reignolds who died at the Battle of Waterloo. At fourteen years of age she came to the United States, and visiting the Western country was engaged to play children's parts. In a short time she made the acquaintance of Edwin Forrest, who obtained for her an opening at the Broadway Theatre, New York, where he was then performing. She made her debut as Virginia to Forrest's Virginius in Appius and Virginia. William E. Burton succeeded in engaging her for his Chambers Street Theatre, where, in a very short time, she established herself as one of the greatest favorites ever connected with that theatre. She was next a regular member of Laura Keene's Theatre, where for a long time she was the reigning favorite, doing the leading business with Laura Keene. She first appeared in London, England, on May 23, 1868, at the Princess' Theatre, as Donna Violante in The Wonder. She returned to America after a few months, since which time she played star engagements in the principal cities, West and South, besides New York.

She was married to Henry Farren in December 1857, who died in St. Louis on January 8, 1860. She was next the wife of Erving Winslow, of Boston; they wed in 1861, and had one child.

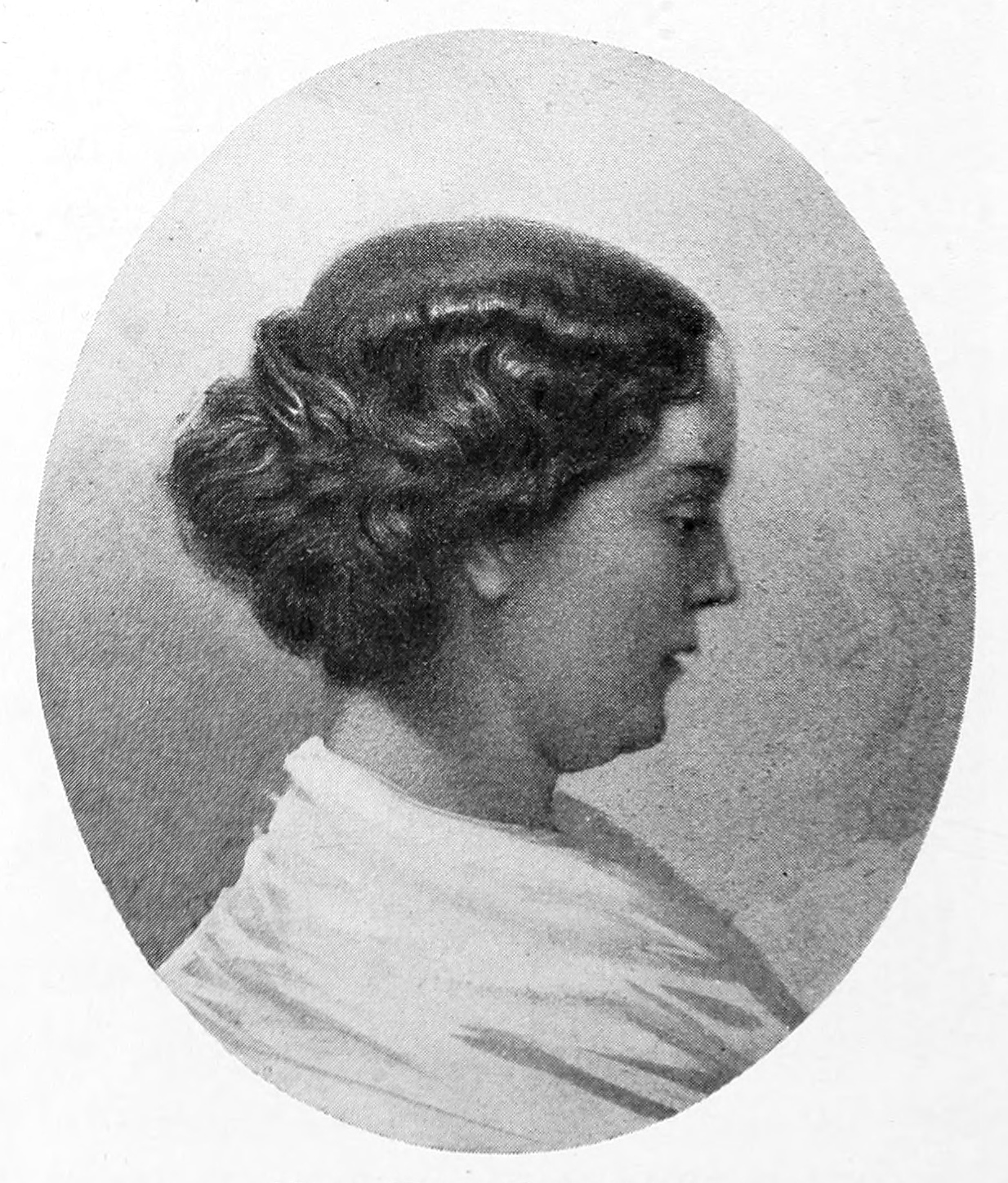
Portrait in profile (by 1903)

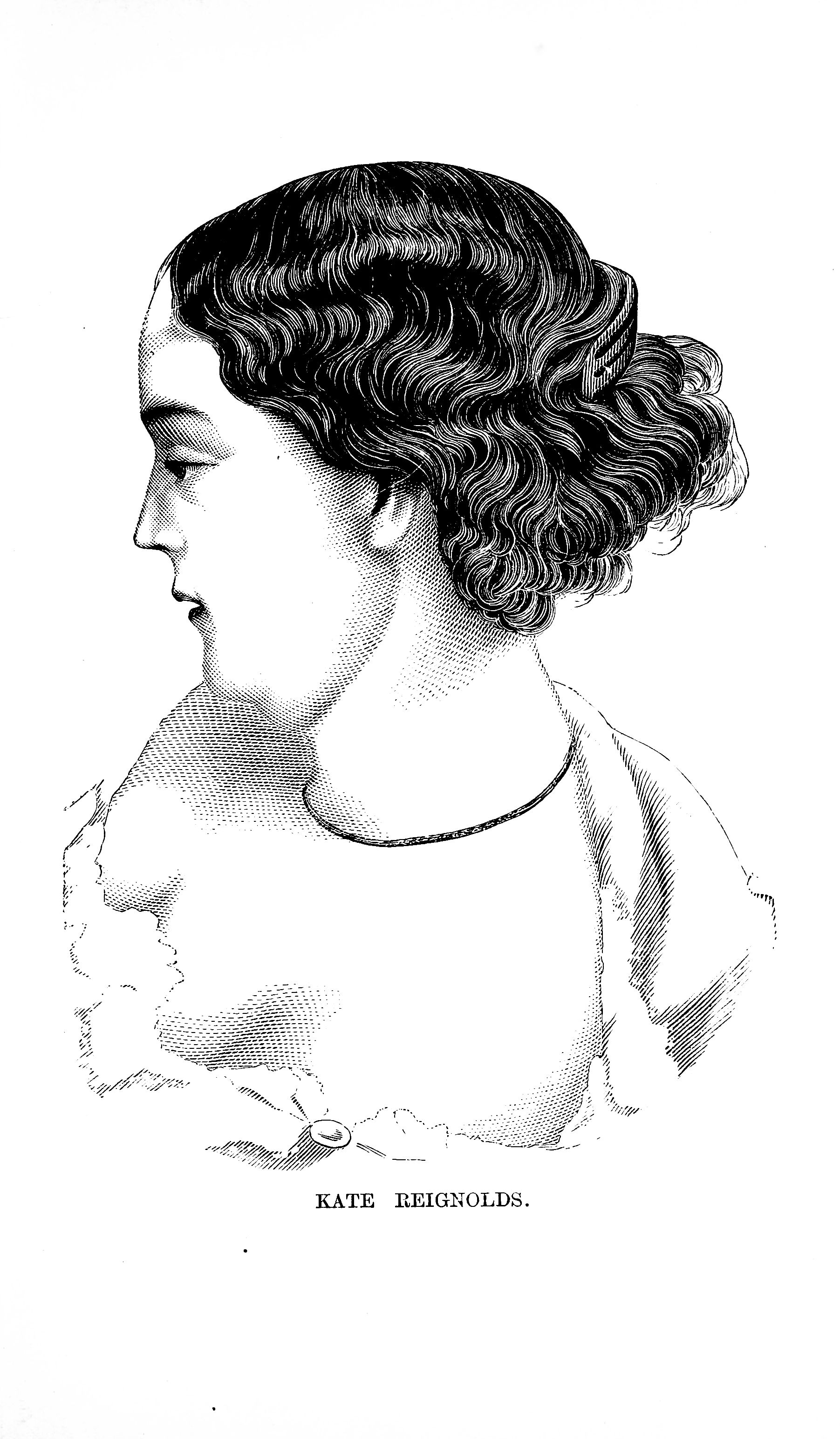
Engraved portrait (by 1870)

== Sources ==
- Clapp, John Bouvé; Edgett, Edwin Francis (1901). Players of the Present. Part 3. New York, NY: The Dunlap Society. pp. 294–297.
- Neely, Kent (2000). "Reignolds, Catherine Mary (1836-1911), actress". American National Biography. Oxford University Press. Retrieved 19 August 2022.
- Reignolds-Winslow, Catherine Mary (1887). Yesterdays with Actors. Cupples and Hurd. pp. vii–xv.
- Ticknor, Howard (June 1903). "The Passing of the Boston Museum". The New England Magazine, 28(4): pp. 388–389.
- "Kate Reignolds a Victim". The Boston Daily Globe. July 12, 1911. p. 9.

Attribution:
