= Charlotte Thompson (actress) =

English-born American actress

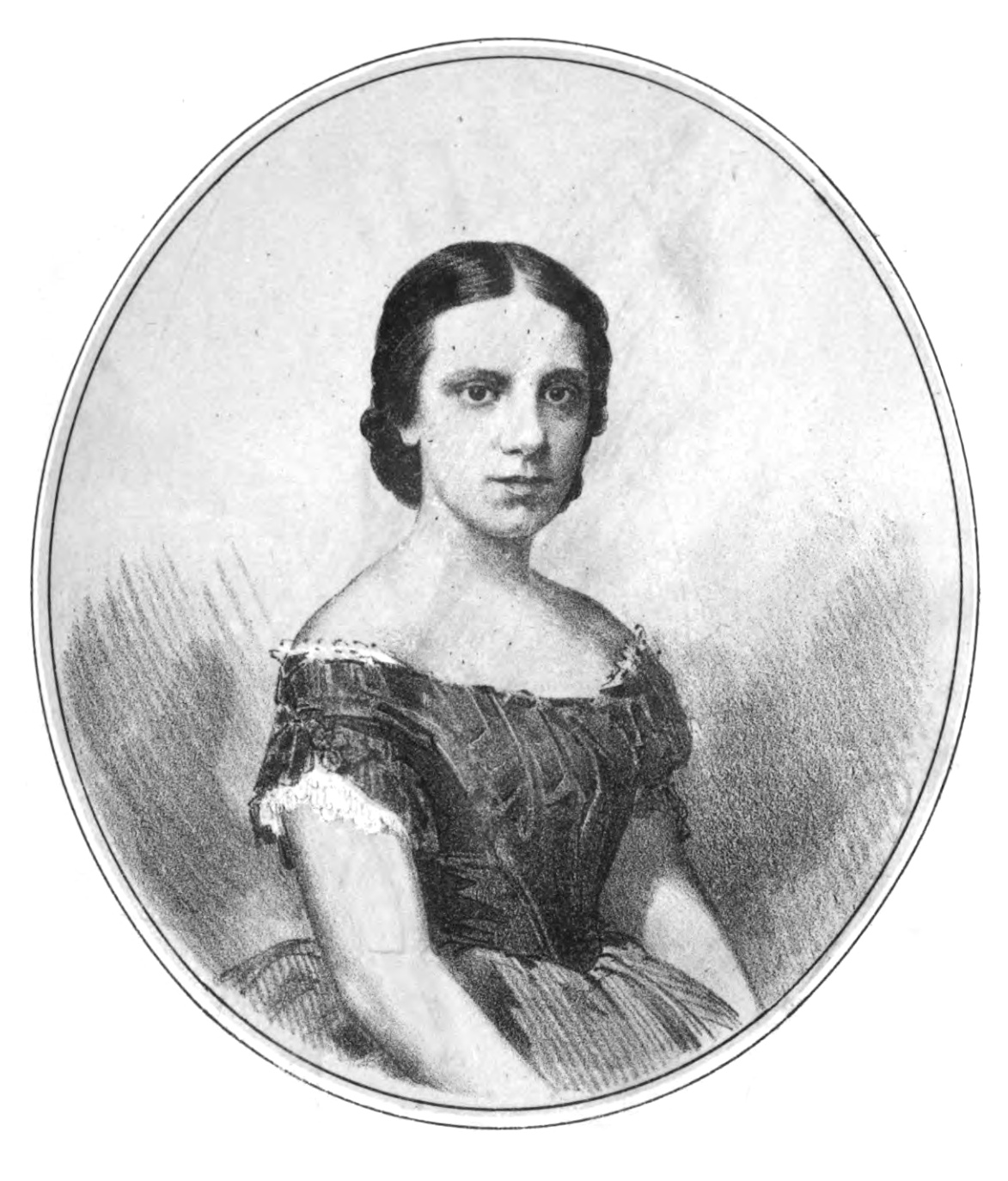
- Born: June 7, 1843; Bradford, England
- Died: April 22, 1898 (aged 54); Montgomery, Alabama
- Other name: Mrs. Loraine Rogers
- Occupation: Actress

Charlotte Thompson (known after marriage as Mrs. Loraine Rogers; 1843–1898) was an English-born American actress. Debuting at the age of eleven, she went on to star in theater productions around the U.S. and Canada. As Jane Eyre, the consensus of critical opinion was that her creation of that role was one of the most remarkable known to the stage.

== Early life ==
She was born in Bradford, England, June 7, 1843.

She came to the U.S. with her mother and a brother, three years her senior, in November 1853. Her father, Lysander Thompson, had preceded his family to the U.S., and was engaged as a comedian and actor in one of the leading theaters of New York City at the time of their arrival. He died on July 28, 1854, little more than six months after his family arrived in New York. Her mother, too, was ill and bedridden, and with no financial support available for the family, Thompson determined she would try to earn a living by following in her father's profession.

She accordingly spoke to Mr. Dyot, a gentleman then connected with Wallack's company, and who had been very kind to the family after the death of Mr. Thompson, making him acquainted with her intentions and asking his friendly aid in becoming an actress. He pleaded the case with the mother, and, after some persuasion, gained her consent. After all the preliminaries were arranged, Mr. Dyot sought the earliest opportunity to ask James William Wallack to engage the child. Wallack was aware of the circumstances of the family, and the application was successful.

== Career ==
=== Child actress ===
She made her first appearance as Phoebe in As You Like It at Wallack's Theater, New York City, in October 1854, where she continued until the summer of 1856. (Note: According to her obituary in The Commercial Appeal (1898), Thompson debuted at the Wallack during the season of 1856-57.)

She was only a child of eleven years when she made her debut, and she probably found great difficulty in overcoming her sensitiveness and timidity; but that she was an indefatigable student, and always acquitted herself creditably, and with good taste of voice and gesture. While engaged in performing the little parts of a little girl, during the two years she was at Wallack's, her mind seized upon her profession with an invincible energy and a determination.

It would be useless to attempt to describe all the sufferings during the three seasons she remained at Wallack's, from various annoyances, but especially through the envy and petty jealousy of those who acted in small parts. The principal members of the company, however, treated her differently, probably from respect to her father's memory. They made her village hats and frocks for the stage, some of which she preserved.. In referring to her first engagement, she stated:—

"I was too young to be of much use to Mr. Wallack, and too shy to think of speaking above a whisper, save at home; yet the benevolent manager paid my salary-six dollars per week-regularly. I thought it a little fortune, and was, and am, very grateful to the dear old gentleman for his kindness to us."

During the summer of 1856, Thompson left Wallack's and obtained an engagement in Montreal, Canada, under the management of Mr. Buckland. She then played such parts as the "Duke of York", in Richard III, and little "Eveline" in Green Bushes. She must at this time have made very considerable proficiency in the dramatic art, for there was a lengthy and elaborate criticism from a Montreal paper of Green Bushes:—

"The acting of little Eveline, by little Miss THOMPSON, was a surprising performance; the most free and natural representation of the part, imaginable."

In September 1856, after a short engagement at Montreal, she returned to Wallack's, New York, where she remained until July 1857, every day adding to her experience. From Wallack's, she went immediately to the Howard Athenaeum, Boston, under the management of Jacob Barrow, where she remained three weeks. A Boston audience gave her a flattering reception and she proved a great attraction at the Athenaeum.—

At the close of her Boston engagement, she returned to New York, and commenced the season at Laura Keene's theatre, in September 1857. She remained at Laura Keene's only a portion of the season, and returned to the Howard Athenæum, where she played until the theatre closed in June 1858. She commenced the following season, in the same year, at the Howard, played a few weeks, and joined a theatrical company in Savannah, Georgia, as "Juvenile Lady". During this visit to Savannah she received a valuable present, comprising beautiful gold and coral bracelets, breast pin and ear drops, each piece being composed of finely wrought gold leaves, with coral flowers and buds.

In 1859, she starred as Mary Stillworth in a production of George Henry Miles's play, Mary's Birthday, performed at the Washington Theatre.

Still a child artist, she was now in great demand among theatrical managers, who were aware of her attractive style, and that she was the pet of audiences wherever she performed. She performed in Mr. Fleming's company Savannah, Georgia, Columbus, Georgia, and Macon, Georgia and other cities till April 1859. She then started for Toronto, Canada to play a star engagement of two weeks, which was extended to five; thence to Troy, New York, where she played as a star four weeks. She bègan the next season in Washington, D.C. as a stock star, and remained there until the opening of Owen's Varieties Theatre, New Orleans, in November 1859. At the end of the season in New Orleans, May 1860, she played star engagements at Troy and Albany, New York.

=== Monsey, New York ===
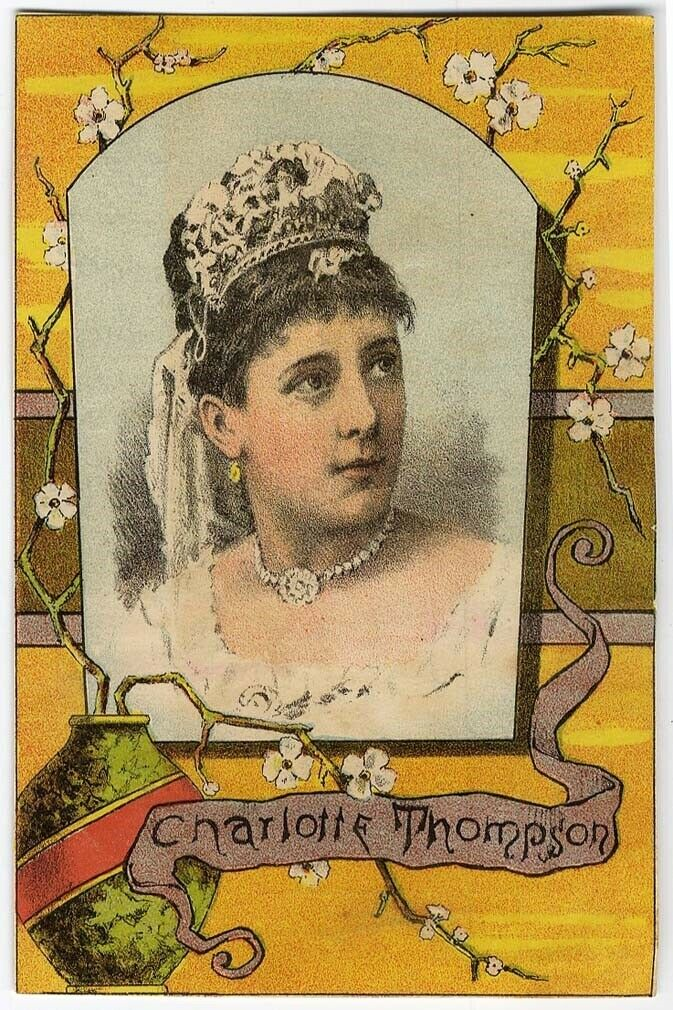
Charlotte Thompson, The Romanoff, Worcester Theatre, New York (before 1898)

During this time, Thompson had by hard work on her part, and the strict economy and careful management of her mother -who has always travelled with her- saved a sufficient amount of money to purchase a home. It was a comfortable farmhouse and 52 acres (21 ha) of land near Monsey, New York, which they named "Fruit Grove". The family were able to pay only a portion of the purchase money, the rest remained on bond and mortgage. After the engagements at Troy and Albany, Thompson retired to this country home. Her first summer at home was spent in assisting her mother in household duties, and in helping her brother to pack fruit for the market.

She revisited New Orleans as "Leading Lady" at the Varieties Theatre, in November 1860. She had a severe illness during her residence in that city. She left in May 1861, returning to Monsey, and passed the summer in study at home. This was her last season in New Orleans, as the Civil War had started, and all communication with the Confederate States was consequently suspended. Her career in the southern metropolis as Leading Lady in a stock company had gained her an established reputation. She was presented at different times, during her New Orleans engagements, with a diamond breast-pin, and three valuable diamond rings, as tokens of appreciation, and on the night of her last benefit, there was thrown to her from the audience, before the fall of the curtain, a US$500 bill, twisted around the stem of a white camelia.

She commenced the next season at Mrs. John Drew's Arch Street Theatre, Philadelphia, on September 1, 1861, and left before her term had expired, through the irregularity of the management in casting her parts she did not engage to play. After this, she accepted a "stock-star" engagement of six weeks at the Front Street Theatre, Baltimore, under the management of George Kunkle, at the expiration of which, in February 1862, she commenced her first regular tour. Her uniform success wherever she performed induced her to sever her connection with all stock companies and trust to the continued favor of theatrical managers and the approbation of the public in her efforts as a star. In this tour, she passed through Pittsburgh, Cincinnati, Louisville, Indianapolis, Philadelphia, Toronto, and Boston. In Philadelphia, she played at the Walnut Street Theatre, and near the close of her engagement, was tendered a complimentary benefit by a large number of citizens. She accepted the proposal, and the benefit took place on May 2, 1862.

She began her second season as a star, after the usual vacation spent at home, in September 1862. This series of visits included the following: Buffalo, Toronto, Cleveland, Boston, Hartford, Louisville, St. Louis, Philadelphia, Cincinnati, Indianapolis, and Pittsburgh. During this tour, her professional duties were somewhat interrupted by illness. She closed with Philadelphia, and worn out by fatigue, returned to her summer retreat at Monsey.

With recuperated health, she resumed her work in September 1863, opening at Louisville, and commenced in St. Louis on October 5, 1863. During her first visit to St. Louis, in the latter part of February 1863, at Ben DeBar's St. Louis Theatre, she performed as Julia in James Sheridan Knowles' The Hunchback, receiving applause which followed interrupted the progress of the play for several minutes. During the first week of Thompson's engagement at the St. Louis Theatre in 1863, she appeared mainly as "Fanchon", in Fanchon, the Cricket, and "Amrie", in Little Barefoot. At the close of the first week of the engagement, one of the public prints suggested that Thompson should perform the character of "Julia", in The Hunchback. The suggestion was adopted; and, accordingly, the play-bills announced this piece, which she played to high applause.

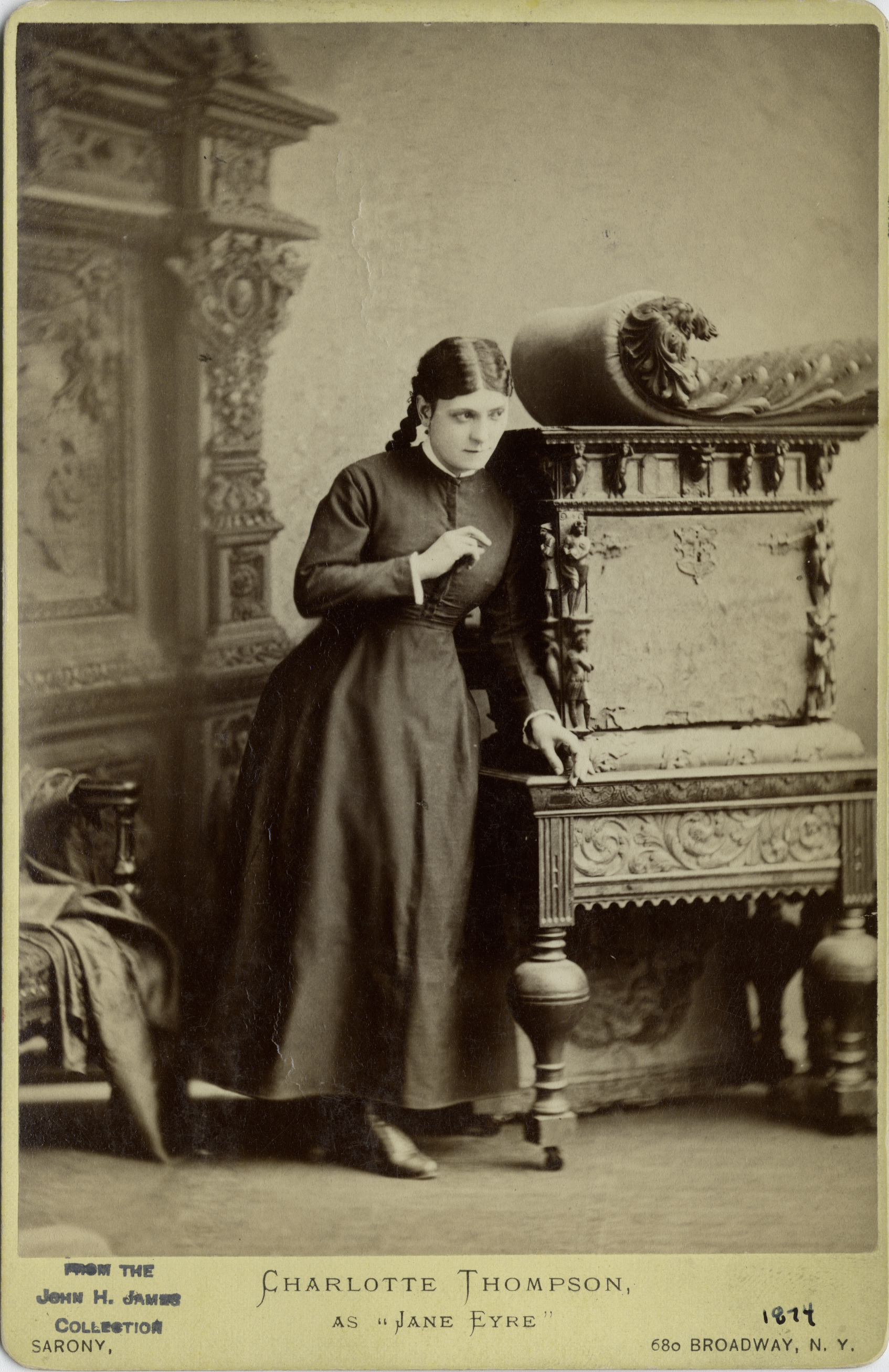
Charlotte Thompson as "Jane Eyre"

On July 29, 1872, she appeared in New York in One Wife, an adaptation of La Princesse George, by Alexandre Dumas. This was the beginning of her emotional work, and she followed it by a production of Jane Eyre. The consensus of critical opinion was that her creation of that role was one of the most remarkable known to the stage.

== Later life ==
Thompson married Loraine Rogers, of California, in 1867.

She retired from the stage several years before her death and resided on her Southern plantation thereafter, near Montgomery, Alabama.

Charlotte Thompson died at her home in Montgomery on April 22, 1898, after an illness which lasted only a few hours.
