= Lotty Hough =

American actress

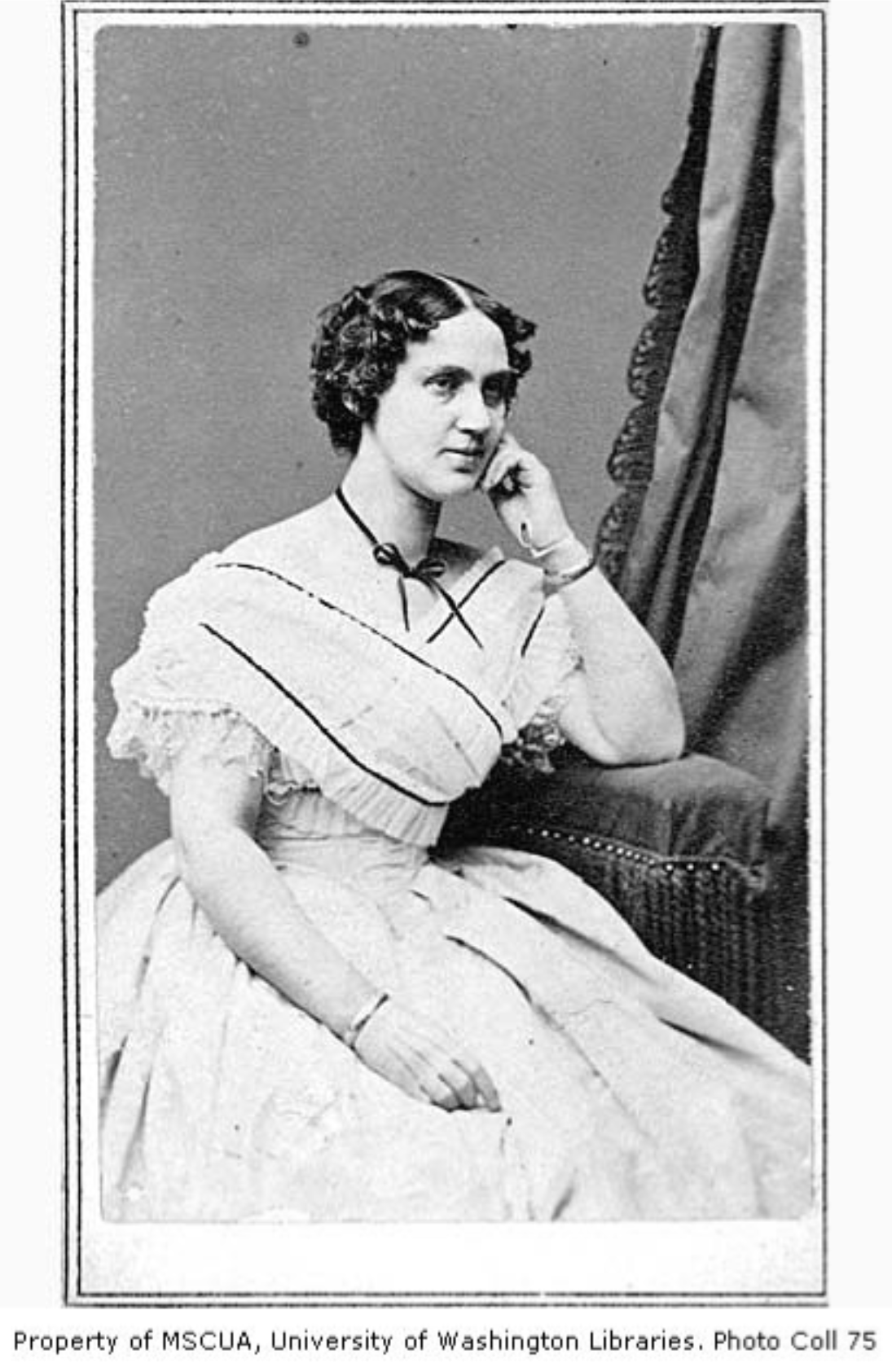
Photograph of Mrs. Lottie Hough, Jan. 22nd, 1864

Charlotte Hough (c. 1833 – January 17, 1896), known as Lotty Hough, sometimes spelled Lottie Hough, was a 19th-century actress and comedian. She played roles for the companies of Laura Keene and Mrs. John Wood.

She debuted in New York at the Bowery Theatre in The Stranger as Charlotte Hough. She also acted in London. Around 1871 she gave a lecture tour on "Popping The Question".

During the U.S. Civil War, she was involved in obtaining passes to get cotton through Union lines.

T. Allston Brown's History of the American Stage (1870) described Hough as a "well known impersonator of Yankee characters" with "considerable talent."

== Selected performances (incomplete) ==
- The Seven Sisters (1860 in New York) (also performed in productions elsewhere)
- Seven Sons (1861) (New York)
- The Serious Family (1862, Washington D.C.)
- Yankee Legacy as Mehitable Ann (1863, New York)
