= John Trimble =

John Trimble may refer to:

- John Trimble (theologian)
- John Trimble (politician)
- John M. Trimble, American builder and theater architect
