= James H. Stoddart =

American stage actor

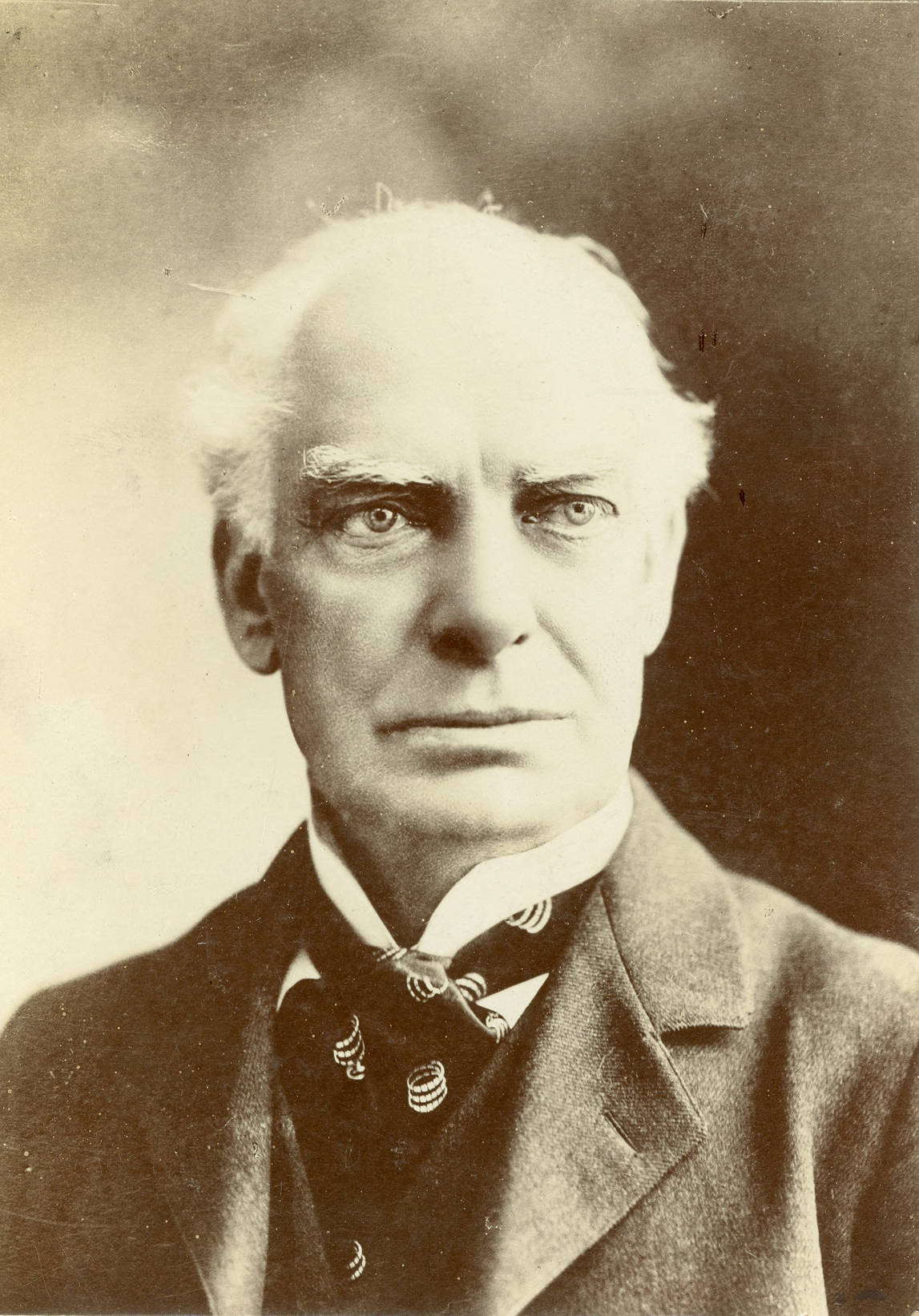
- Born: October 13, 1827; Barnsley, Yorkshire, England
- Died: December 9, 1907 (aged 80); Sewaren, New Jersey, U.S.
- Occupation: Actor
- Years active: 1830s-1905
- Spouse: Matilda Phillips
- Children: Thomas C. Stoddart, Mary C. Stoddart

James Henry Stoddart October 13, 1827 – December 9, 1907) was a popular stage actor originally from Britain, active on the American stage from 1854 until 1905.

Stoddart was born in Yorkshire, the son of an actor at the Theatre Royal, Glasgow. After acting in Britain (starting as a youth), he came to Wallack's Theatre in New York in 1854—his first appearance was in a small role in A Phenomenon in a Smock Frock. After two seasons with Wallack's, he joined Laura Keene's company, and later returning to Wallack's. He played and had his longest term success with A.M. Palmer's Union Square Theater stock company, with which he was connected for 20 years. Generally a stock player, late in his career he also achieved stardom playing the role of Lachlan Campbell in the 1901 popular play The Bonnie Brier Bush, an adaptation of the 1894 short story collection Beside the Bonnie Brier Bush. His autobiography, The Recollections of a Player, was published in 1902. He retired from the stage in 1905 due to illness.

Stoddart married actress Matilda Phillips in 1855. Stoddart died at his home in Sewaren, New Jersey on December 9, 1907.

== Selected roles ==
- Parson Hawthorne- Mary's Birthday; or the Cynic (1857)
- Sairy Gamp- Martin Chuzzlewit (1864)
- Pierre Michel- Rose Michel (1875)
- Newman Noggs- Smike (1877) *adapted from Charles Dickens's Nicholas Nickleby
- Lachlan Campbell- The Bonnie Brier Bush (1901)
