= Thomas Baker (musician) =

English composer (c. 1820 – 1888)

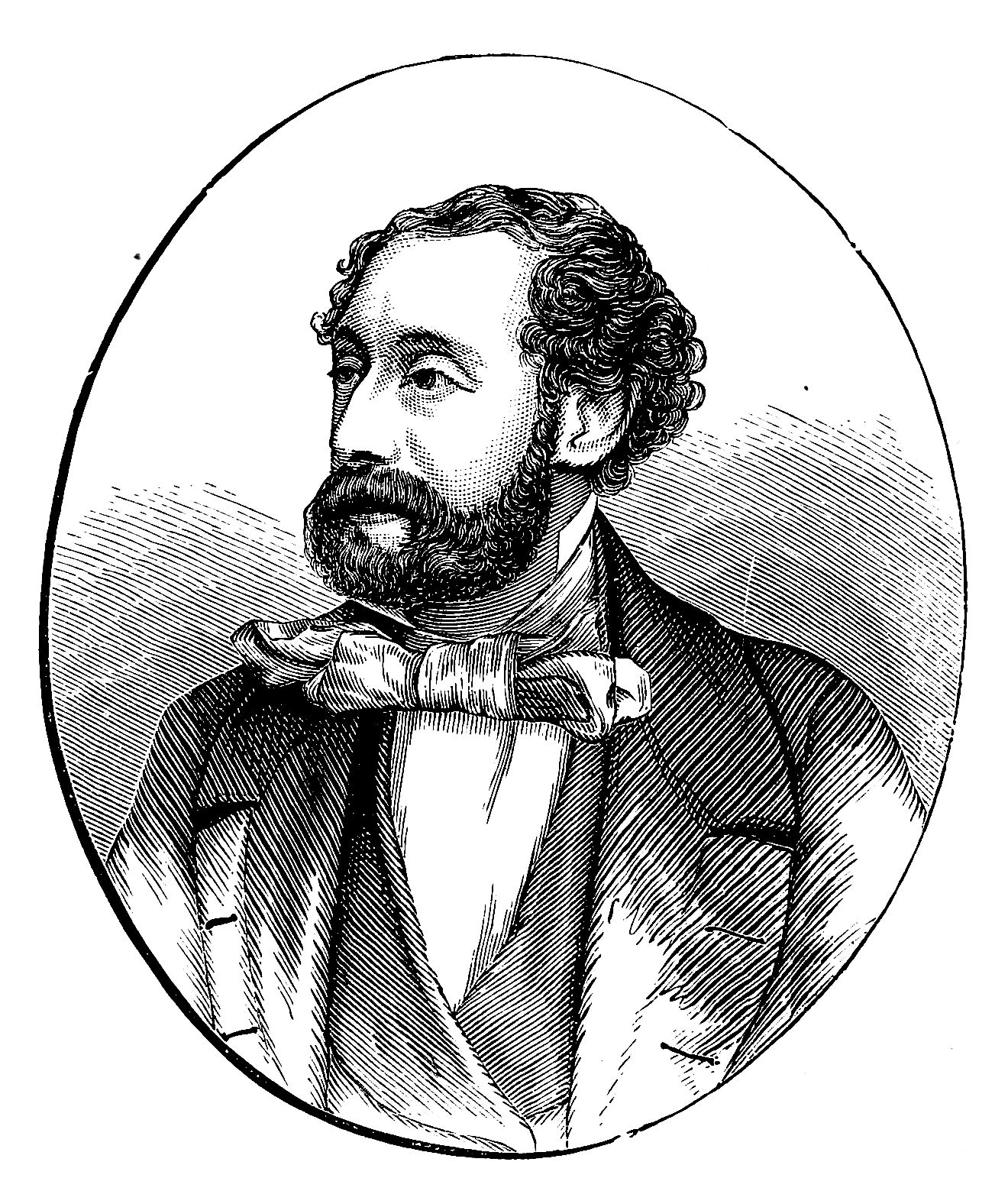
Thomas Baker

Thomas Baker (c. 1820 – 1888) was an English composer, music arranger, conductor, violinist, and musical producer who was primarily active in New York City. He is best known for composing the music for The Black Crook; a work which is widely cited as the first precursor to the twentieth-century musical.

== Life and career ==
Thomas Baker was born in England in c. 1820. A child prodigy on the violin, he was educated at the Royal Academy of Music in London.

Baker joined the orchestra of the French conductor and composer Louis-Antoine Jullien, and with this ensemble he traveled on a concert tour to the United States in 1853. He decided to remain in America, and began his career working in the United States as an opera conductor at Niblo's Garden in New York City. He left that post two years later in 1855 to become musical director for the impresario Laura Keene; a position he remained in through 1863. His first composition to be staged on Broadway, Novelty, opened at Laura Keene's Variety House on February 22, 1856.

In 1861, Baker published the first "sheet-music publication of any black spiritual", Song of the Contrabands. His efforts were later criticized as betraying a lack of knowledge of black music, for having "turned the slave song into a parlor ballad in 6/8 time".

He was credited with writing the music for the 1866 stage production The Black Crook, which premiered at Niblo's Garden in New York City, using a melodrama and a French ballet troupe whose venue burnt to the ground while they still rehearsed. The "result was an unprecedented triumph", and was one of the major events in the early history of the extravaganza. The production "is frequently cited as the first real precursor to the twentieth-century musical".

Baker also arranged musical productions of Cinderella and Aladdin. He wrote the music for a number of productions at the Olympic Theatre in New York. The last play for which he arranged and directed the music was titled Diplomacy and was produced on 1 April 1878.

== See also ==
- The Seven Sisters (1860)
- The Black Crook (1866)
