= Louise Allen =

Louise Allen may refer to:

- Louise Allen (novelist) (born 1949), British writer of romance novels
- Louise Allen (tennis) (born 1962), American tennis player
- Louise Allen (actress) (c. 1870–1909), American stage actress
- Louise Allen (c. 1840–1911), American stage actress better known as Mrs. J. H. Allen
