= Mary's Birthday =

1854 three act play

Mary's Birthday; or the Cynic
- Original language: English
- Written by: George Henry Miles
- Setting: America, Present Day

Premiere
- Date: 1857
- Place: Laura Keene's Theatre (now the Olympic Theatre), New York

Mary's Birthday; or the Cynic is an 1854 three act drama by the American writer George Henry Miles. It first premiered at Laura Keene's Theatre in New York in 1857, with Laura Keene starring as Mary Stillworth, Charles Wheatleigh as George Lordly, and James H. Stoddart as Parson Hawthorne.

== Plot ==
The play opens with Parson Hawthorne talking to George Lordly (the titular cynic), with George's father in law, Adam, in the immediate vicinity. Notably, Adam has gone mad after Helen, his daughter and George's wife, ran off with another man, Harley. Parson Hawthorne laments that a man whom he had recently begun to promote was discovered to have cuckolded a parishioner the previous night. George expresses amusement at his friend's anguish. Parson Hawthorne and George spot George's brother Vernon Lordly walking down the path with Alice Hawthorne, Parson Hawthorne's daughter. George suspects that Vernon is unfaithful to his fiancé, George's ward, Mary Stillworth, and is courting Alice instead. The pair enters, and upon finding Parson Hawthorne and George at the grotto, Alice breaks off her relationship with George. George takes Vernon aside and tells him that he is breaking Mary's heart. Vernon insists that Mary does not love him. After all the aforementioned characters have departed, with the exception of Adam, Helen and Harley return, apparently from Italy, bedraggled and malnourished. Helen tearfully reunites with her father.

George insists that Mary and Vernon marry. Because this is what he wishes, Mary consents, and decides to marry Vernon the following day- even though she is secretly in love with George. In a soliloquy, George implies that he is in love with Mary, who soon afterwards discovers a letter from her deceased father that was intended to be discovered on her twentieth birthday. The letter discloses that George took the blame for an act of financial fraud that Mary's father had committed. Mary confronts her guardian with the letter, and demands that he tell the world the truth. George rebuffs his ward, asserting that he has a duty to her father, who nursed George after he was injured in a duel with Harley. Mary argues that he has fulfilled his duty by raising her, but George disagrees, and insists that he will travel to England after Mary and Vernon are wed, as he does not want to be a damper on their lives. Later, Mary tells Alice that she need not despair over Vernon; Mary will die shortly after her wedding, covertly implying that she will die of heartbreak because she is in love with George.

The day of the wedding, as guests gather at Lordly's house, a funeral bell tolls. Mary declares that this is a sign of her impending death. Vernon helps Mary and George realize that the other reciprocates their feelings. Suddenly, Adam, who has just regained his sanity, enters. He has rung the funeral bells himself. He tells the partygoers that Helen and Harley have died, and confesses that the former was always in love with the latter, but was forbidden by her father to marry him due to his lack of wealth. Upon revealing this, Adam dies.

Throughout the play, the servants Beale and Jane provide humorous commentary on the events of the plot.

== Reception ==
The New-York Tribune gave a largely positive review of the play's original 1857 production, praising the work's departure from the tropes popular in mid-19th century melodrama, as well as the drama's domestic atmosphere. The reviewer commended the cast's performances, with the exception of J.A. Smith, who played Vernon Lordly.

In a review of the 1857 run, a correspondent for The Era found the play itself mediocre, but praised the cast's performances and the production's set design.

An 1858 production of the play at the Holliday Street Theatre received positive reviews in several publications, extracts of which were featured in The Baltimore Sun. Both publications are identified only as American and Patriot. The reviewer writing for the former compares the play favorably to French drama, which he considers immoral, while praising what he considers the play's American atmosphere and moral sentiments. The critic writing for the latter praised both Miles's writing and the performance of Julia Dean (Hayne), who starred as Mary.

The Daily Exchange gave the aforementioned 1858 production of the play a mixed review. While the reviewer praises the Miles's use of language and the drama's exploration of the characters' emotions, he complains that the play lacks incident, and relies too much on dialogue. Additionally, he heavily criticizes the cast's acting, with the exception of the players performing the roles of Beale and Jane. The reviewer particularly dislikes Julia Dean's performance as Mary, disparaging it as mannered and stiff.

In 1881, The American Catholic Quarterly Review characterized Mary's Birthday as an accomplished play, but one of minimal interest compared to Miles's other dramatic work.

Mary's Birthday is discussed in the first volume of scholar Arthur Hodgson Quinn's 1923 History of the American Drama. While Quinn observes that all the characters are "well known types", he was very moved by the scene between Helen and her father.

== Revivals ==
In 1858, Mary's Birthday was performed at Holliday St. Theatre in Baltimore, was performed there in 1859 with a different cast, and later transferred to the Washington Theatre in the same year, where Charlotte Thompson starred as Mary.

The same year, Julia Dean reprised the role of Mary Stillworth in a production of the play performed at the Louisville Theatre in Louisville, Kentucky.

In 1861, the play was performed at the Metropolitan Theatre in Sacramento, California.

== Publication history ==
Mary's Birthday was first published in 1858. The play was reprinted in 1868 and 1899, with several excerpts of it being featured in Gems of George Henry Miles in 1901. The play has continued to stay in print throughout the 21st century.
