= God Save the South =

De facto national anthem of the Confederate States of America

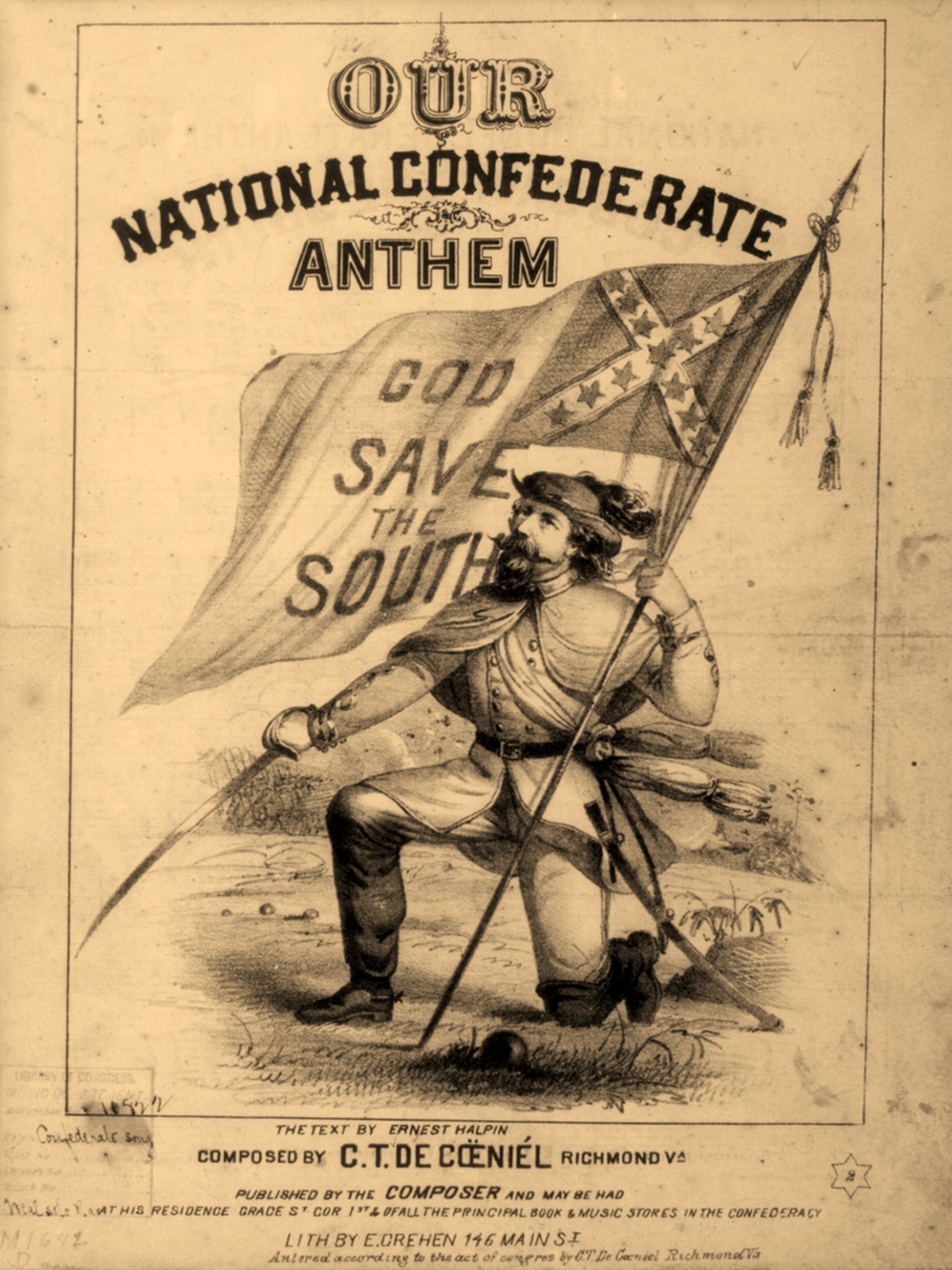
- Sheet music for the version composed by C. T. De Cœniél, as published in Richmond, Virginia
- Unofficial national anthem of Confederate States of America
- Lyrics: Earnest Halphin, 1861
- Music: Charles W. A. Ellerbrock, 1861

Audio sample
- God Save the South (instrumental): file; help

"God Save the South" is a poem-turned-song considered by some to have been the unofficial national anthem of the Confederate States of America. The words were written in 1861 by George Henry Miles, under the pen name Earnest Halphin. It was most commonly performed to a tune by Charles Wolfgang Amadeus Ellerbrock, although a second version was also published with a tune by C. T. De Cœniél.

== History ==
After Union forces began using "Battle Hymn of the Republic" as a rallying song in 1861, Halphim wrote "God Save The South" to inspire Confederate soldiers with the thought that God would be with them. It was the first song published in the Confederate States—specifically, in New Orleans, Louisiana—since the Ordinance of Secession. The song was used in attempts to foster a unique Southern national culture to distinguish the Confederate States from the United States. The hymn was later included in The Soldier's Companion, the hymnal distributed to all Confederate soldiers.

Some considered "God Save The South" the de facto national anthem of the Confederacy. The song was published in Virginia with the subtitle "Our national Confederate anthem" with the image of a Confederate soldier carrying the Stainless Banner with the words "God Save The South" on it. Its main rival for the unofficial title was "Dixie", popular among Confederate soldiers and citizens as a marching and parade song.

In 1950, Richard Harwell wrote: "[Dixie] can hardly be said to meet the requirements of a national anthem, [although] it has become a truly national tune, permanently enshrined in the hearts of Americans in both the North and the South. That honor rightly belongs to 'God Save the South' not just by virtue of its status as the new nation's first published song but also because of its stirring poetry and its outstanding musical setting."

== Composition ==
While the anthem mostly used Ellerbrock's music, it was also set to the tune of the British national anthem, "God Save the King". Because of this association, as well as a perceived lack of originality, “God Save the South” was criticized in Southern Punch, a weekly periodical modeled after Britain’s Punch. De Cœniél wrote another tune for "God Save the South" after Ellerbrock's original.

The fifth verse has been cited as an example of the citizens of the Confederacy's perceived affiliation with George Washington, a rebel of the American Revolutionary War.

== Lyrics ==
God save the South, God save the South,
Her altars and firesides, God save the South!
Now that the war is nigh, now that we arm to die,
Chanting our battle cry, "Freedom or death!"
Chanting our battle cry, "Freedom or death!"

God be our shield, at home or afield,
Stretch Thine arm over us, strengthen and save.
What tho' they're three to one, forward each sire and son,
Strike till the war is won, strike to the grave!
Strike till the war is won, strike to the grave!

God made the right stronger than might,
Millions would trample us down in their pride.
Lay Thou their legions low, roll back the ruthless foe,
Let the proud spoiler know God's on our side.
Let the proud spoiler know God's on our side.

Hark honor's call, summoning all.
Summoning all of us unto the strife.
Sons of the South, awake! Strike till the brand shall break,
Strike for dear Honor's sake, Freedom and Life!
Strike for dear Honor's sake, Freedom and Life!

Rebels before, our fathers of yore.
Rebel's the righteous name Washington bore.
Why, then, be ours the same, the name that he snatched from shame,
Making it first in fame, foremost in war.
Making it first in fame, foremost in war.

War to the hilt, theirs be the guilt,
Who fetter the free man to ransom the slave.
Up then, and undismay'd, sheathe not the battle blade,
Till the last foe is laid low in the grave!
Till the last foe is laid low in the grave!

God save the South, God save the South,
Dry the dim eyes that now follow our path.
Still let the light feet rove safe through the orange grove,
Still keep the land we love safe from Thy wrath.
Still keep the land we love safe from Thy wrath.

God save the South, God save the South,
Her altars and firesides, God save the South!
For the great war is nigh, and we will win or die,
Chanting our battle cry, "Freedom or death!"
Chanting our battle cry, "Freedom or death!"
