= The Seven Sisters (musical) =

- Music: Thomas Baker
- Lyrics: Robert Jones
- Book: Robert Jones and Thomas B. de Walden
- Basis: The Seven Daughters of Satan
- Productions: 1860 Broadway

The Seven Sisters is a musical burlesque extravaganza with music composed by Thomas Baker, lyrics by Robert Jones and a story by Jones and Thomas Blades de Walden (1811–1873) based on the German language work The Seven Daughters of Satan. The work played in New York for 253 consecutive performances, making it a tremendous success for its time. The musical debuted on November 26, 1860, and ran through August 10, 1861 at Laura Keene's Theatre. Though considered "rubbish" by critics, it was an important precursor to 1866's The Black Crook.

== Background ==
The piece was a gamble by impresario Laura Keene, in the hope that the elaborate and expensive scenery of the show, as well as the singing actresses and many dancers, would draw crowds. The New York Clipper noted that the women wore "shocking low-necked dresses" and "tight-fitting clothes". The loose storyline was adapted, according to the musical's book writers, Robert Jones and Thomas B. de Walden, from a German piece called The Seven Daughters of Satan. University of Pittsburgh professor emeritus of American literature Robert L. Gale speculates that the writers may have been referring to Die Töchter Luzifers ("The Daughters of Lucifer") by Wilhelm Friedrich; although this is not a certainty.

The plot concerned the "activities of mortal and immortal characters traveling about the lower regions of New York City." Music was contributed by Thomas Baker, who would also later write the music for The Black Crook.

The 1897 biography of Keene by John Creahan describes the United States in November 1860 as "busy in President-making, and politics had commanded the attention of almost everybody." Thus, the theatrical season had been a poor one. "As well played comedies and dramas has failed to attract, Miss Keene at once determined to give spectacular trash, the result being that on the 26th of November, the 'Seven Sisters' was produced in magnificent style, its final scene, by [scene designer James Roberts from Covent Garden in London], being the first of the grand transformation scenes which have since been made so popular by 'The Black Crook', 'The White Fawn,' and plays of a similar character." The transformation scene was titled "The Birth of the Butterfly in the Bower of Ferns."

The features of the play were altered during its run, and roles and actors were changed from time to time. Creahan called the production first "decidedly Southern in character", but after the American Civil War began, some "speeches were considerably modified, but still the theatre was an attractive resort for the secession elements in New York." In February 1861, a section called "The Dream of the Secessionist" was added (and/or "Uncle Sam's Magic Lantern"), with "virgin damsels" representing each state and showing their disagreements. The New York Clipper joked of the changes, "We shouldn't wonder if the Seven Sisters should be transformed into the tragedy of Macbeth before Miss Keene is done with it."

== Critical response ==
Initially critics did not seem to mind the lack of substance to the production. For example, the New York Times review said "there was no plot to it, or attempt at plot, and equally of course there was plenty of fun, brimfull and overflowing. ... The entire piece is one of those indescribable and admirable absurdities at which we laugh heartily when we see it, while we are almost ashamed of ourselves the next morning for having been amused with such folly." The New York Evening Express said the show was "well calculated to make a great success" despite that being "decidedly not on account of the talent displayed in its construction" or "on the score of its literary merit."

Keene ultimately lost some of her artistic credibility after the play's long run, during which no more legitimate pieces were performed. Nevertheless, she opened her next theatrical season with a play in the same vein called The Seven Sons. It debuted on September 23, 1861, and ran for 96 performances through December 21, 1861. But Keene acknowledged its lack of artistic merit by billing it as "an incomprehensible mass of dramatic nonsense."

== Legacy ==
Productions of The Seven Sisters were also mounted successfully outside of New York.

The Seven Sisters essentially co-opted the low comedy elements of the concert saloon, and in that respect was a forerunner of later productions such as The Black Crook and the "leg shows" of Victorian burlesque.

== Original Broadway cast ==
- Mrs. J.H Allen as Mary Springleaf
- Mr. Barton as Snail
- H.F. Daly as Arthur Stumper
- Lotty Hough as Tartarina
- Laura Keene as Diavoline
- Dan Leeson as Pluto
- Polly Marshall as Plutella
- Mr. Wren as Catchem
- T.B. Johnston as Astaroth (died May 27, 1861)
- Milnes Levick as Detnonos
- James Gilbert Burnett as Cuffee
- Mr. C. Peters as ? Pluto
- Eliza Couldock as Farcinella
- Miss Francis as Spirit of Arthur's Sister
- Mrs. H. Vining as Sulphurina
