= Pike's Opera House (Cincinnati) =

Coordinates: 39°06′00″N 84°30′42″W

Pike's Opera House was a theater in Cincinnati owned by distiller and entrepreneur Samuel Napthali Pike (1822–1872). Located on Fourth Street between Vine and Walnut streets, it was the first home of the Cincinnati Symphony Orchestra.

== First theater ==
Pike's Opera House was designed by New York–based architects Horatio Nelson White and John M. Trimble and constructed from 1857 to 1859 at a cost of $500,000. It opened on February 22, 1859. The next year, on September 29, 1860, the opera house hosted a grand ball for the royal visit of Edward, Prince of Wales. On April 15, 1865, Junius Brutus Booth Jr. was performing at Pike's when he was informed that his brother, John Wilkes Booth, had assassinated Abraham Lincoln. On March 22, 1866, a gas leak caused the theater to explode, taking with it the original offices of The Cincinnati Enquirer, along with archives of the Enquirer's first 25 years. No one was killed.

== Second theater ==
Isaiah Rogers rebuilt the theater after the fire. It reopened on February 12, 1868, the same year that Pike opened another opera house in Manhattan, now known as the Grand Opera House. In 1895, the Cincinnati Symphony Orchestra gave its first concerts at the original Pike's Opera House before moving to Music Hall the following year. Pike's burned down again on February 26, 1903. The ruins remained for two years before the lot was cleared to make way for the Sinton Hotel.
