= George Henry Miles =

American dramatist

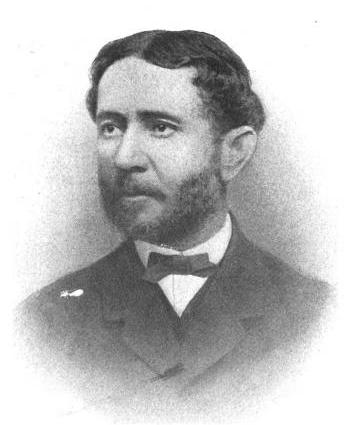
- Miles, from a posthumous edition of his writing
- Born: George Henry Miles; July 31, 1824; Baltimore, Maryland, U.S.
- Died: July 23, 1871 (aged 46); Thornbrook, Maryland, U.S.
- Education: Mount St. Mary’s College
- Occupations: Dramatist, writer, lawyer
- Spouse: Adaline Tiers (m. 1859)
- Relatives: Solomon Etting (Great- granduncle)
- Writing career
- Pen name: Earnest Halphin
- Notable work: “God Save the South”

George Henry Miles (July 31, 1824 – July 23, 1871) was an American writer. Miles wrote "God Save the South", under the pen name Earnest Halphin, which is considered to have been the unofficial national anthem of the Confederate States of America during the American Civil War.

== Biography ==
Miles was born in Baltimore, Maryland, to William Miles and Sarah Mickle. His father was a merchant and former commercial agent of the United States to Haiti. He was of English descent. Sarah Mickle was of Scottish and Ashkenazi Jewish descent, and was the grandniece of merchant and politician Solomon Etting. George Henry was a dramatist and man of letters. He graduated from Mount St. Mary's College, Emmitsburg, in 1842, and then took up the study of law, commencing to practice later in his native city.

The profession of law was ill-suited to his temper of thought and to his literary talents, which had early evinced themselves in a tendency to turn many neat verses. His first appearance in print was with an historical tale, The Truce of God, which appeared serially in the United States Catholic Magazine, followed shortly by The Governess, and in 1849, by Loretto, which won a $50 prize offered by the Catholic Mirror. The following year, when but twenty-six years of age, with his tragedy of Mahommed he won the $1000 prize offered by Edwin Forrest. The law was now definitely abandoned for the drama. In 1859 he scored his first success with the tragedy of De Soto, produced at the Broadway Theatre, New York City, and during the same season his dramedy, Mary's Birthday, was performed. In 1859 Señor Valiente earned the distinction of being presented in New York, Boston, and Baltimore on the same night. During the season 1860-61 the Seven Sisters, based on the theme of Secession, was produced at Laura Keene's Theatre, New York City. Other dramatic ventures were not so successful, and his most pretentious effort, Cromwell, a Tragedy, remains unfinished.

In 1851 Miles was dispatched to Spain by President Millard Fillmore on official business. He was again in Europe in 1864 and, on his return, published in the Catholic World a series of charming sketches, Glimpses of Tuscany, and, in 1866, Christine: a Troubadour's Song, and a volume of verse, Christian Poems. In 1859 he had been appointed professor of English Literature at Mount St. Mary's, in which year he married Adaline Tiers, of New York, and moved from Baltimore to Thornbrook, a cottage near Emmitsburg, where he lived until his death.

In addition to works of creative fancy, Miles delivered in 1847 a Discourse in Commemoration of the Landing of the Pilgrims of Maryland, and, shortly before his death, contemplated a series of critical estimates on William Shakespeare's characters. Only one, that upon Hamlet, was published (in the Southern Review), which won no mean measure of appreciation from contemporary scholars in England.
