= John M. Trimble =

American theater architect

John Montague Trimble (1815–1867), known professionally as John M. Trimble, was an American builder and theater architect responsible for many prominent theaters in New York, such as Palmo's Opera House, as well as theaters in Buffalo, Richmond, Charleston, Cincinnati, Pittsburgh, and Albany.

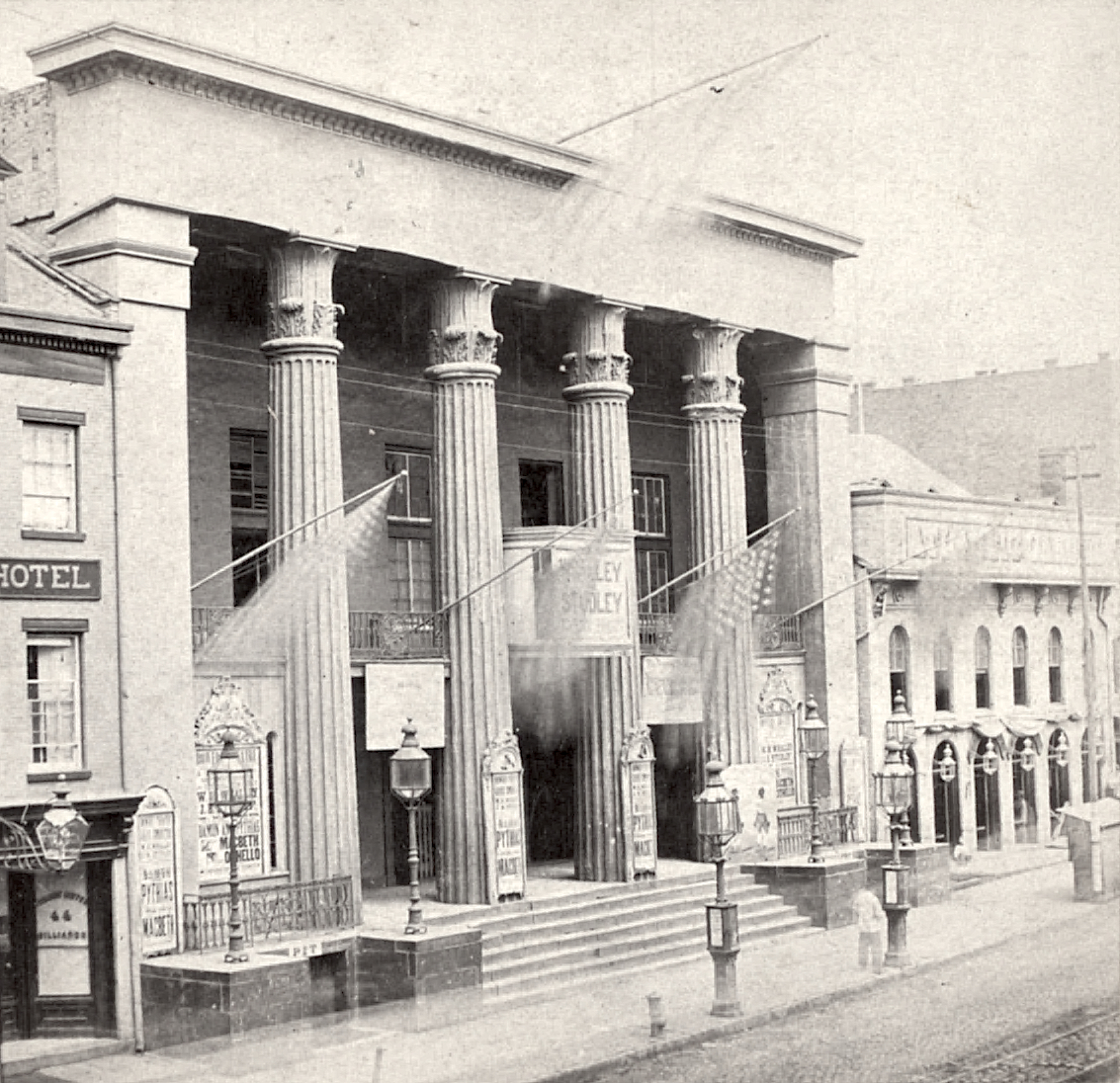
Bowery Theatre in July 1867

H. P. Phelps writes:

Mr. John Montague Trimble…was born in New York, in 1815,…and became stage carpenter at the old Bowery [Theatre]. He, in time, acquired the trades of both carpentry and masonry, and also learned something of architecture. He became famous as the Lightning Builder. Once, when the Bowery burned down, he re-erected it in sixty days. He built Barnum's old museum, Genin's hat store [next to Barnum's on Broadway between Ann and Fulton Streets in New York], and other buildings, almost without number, and in an incredible [sic] short space of time. During the California excitement, he built many houses which were shipped to the Pacific coast, all ready to be put up. He delighted to make a contract to have a certain number done in a very short time, say forty days, and then do the work in half that period. He understood, thoroughly, the way to employ a large number of men at the same time and at the best advantage. His work seemed always done by magic. [But Brown reports: “During the time Brougham’s Lyceum was building, and on August 5, 1850, the rear part of the building fell to the ground, killing two of the laborers.”] …While building the New Bowery, in 1859, he went to bed one night and arose the next morning, blind.…[He] bore up bravely under this painful affliction, although he never did much work afterward. One summer,…it was suggested to him to come to Albany and change the old Pearl street theatre, then a church, into its original condition. He thought well of the idea, acted upon it, and so, in 1863, became for the first time in his life, a [theatre] manager. [The architectural work was done by Thomas R. Jackson.] He died at 4 A. M., June 7, 1867, at 31 Beaver street [Albany], of consumption, and was buried in Greenwood cemetery.

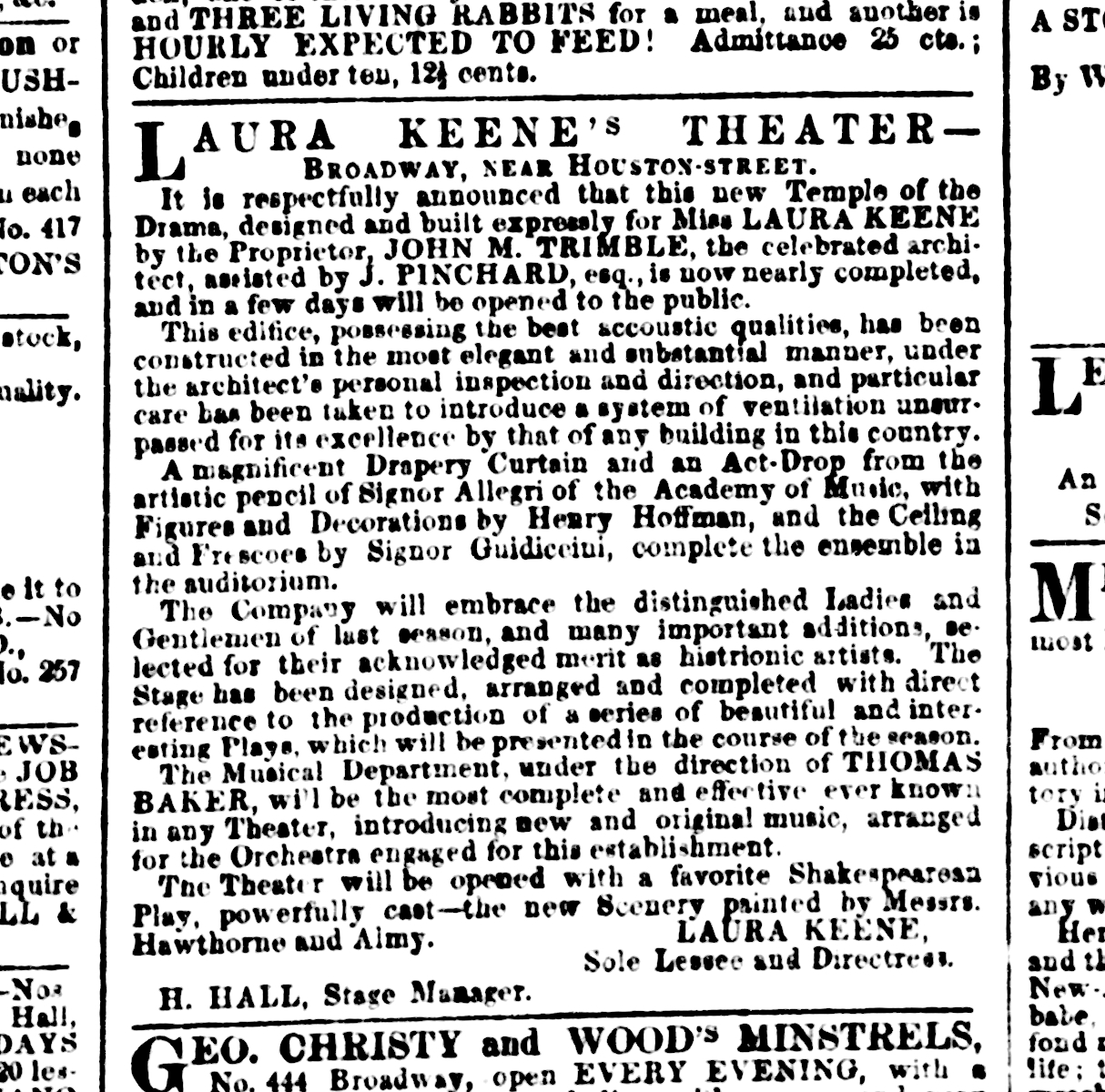
November 1856 newspaper ad for Laura Keene's Theater

In 1848, he was engaged to enlarge the Albany Museum, a theatre.

Trimble's obituary in The New York Times began, "All New Yorkers will regret to learn that John M. Trimble, the architect whose remarkable energy brought him the title of 'steam builder,' is no longer living." The Albany Evening Journal wrote:

From the Bowery he went to the National Theatre when it was opened….Here he got up the gorgeous scenery and stage trappings that added so much….He became an architect and builder of public places of amusement….Among others he built the New Bowery, the Olympic [originally called Laura Keene's Theatre], Broadway and Tripler Hall, and remodeled the Old Park Theatre in New York.…He built the Buffalo, Richmond and Charleston theatres….Most unfortunately, Mr. Trimble has for several years been totally blind.…Despite this calamity, Mr. Trimble has worked steadily along with all the energy of a man fully possessed of all his senses.

In 1857, he designed Pike's Opera House in Cincinnati along with Horatio Nelson White. The following year, he designed Thalian Hall in Wilmington, North Carolina, which is still in use.

== Bibliography ==
- Bishir, Catherine W. and Buchman, Tim North Carolina Architecture: Portable Edition. The Historic Preservation Foundation of North Carolina, Inc., 2005 (original edition: University of North Carolina Press, 1990)
- Brown, Thomas Allston A History of the New York Stage, Vol. 1. (Dodd, Mead and Company, New York, 1903)
- Ireland, Joseph N. Records of the New York Stage, Vol. 2. (T. H. Morrell, New York, 1867)
- Morrison, Craig Theaters (W. W. Norton & Company, Inc., New York, 2006)
- Phelps, H. P. Players of a Century: A Record of the Albany Stage, 2nd edition. (Edgar S. Werner, New York, 1890 [1st edition. Joseph McDonough, Albany, 1880])
- Steelman, Ben “What is Thalian Hall?” at website MyReporter.com
- (WDI) Thalian Hall at website of Wilmington Downtown, Inc.
