= Palmo's Opera House =

Former theatre in Manhattan, New York

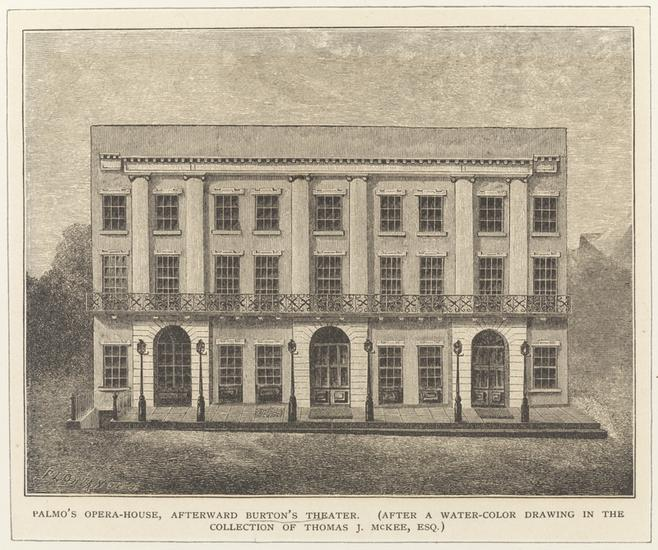
- Drawing of Palmo's Opera House (1882), based on an 1850 water color

General information
- Location: Manhattan, New York City, Chambers Street
- Named for: Ferdinand Palmo
- Opened: 1844
- Demolished: 1876

Design and construction
- Architect: John M. Trimble

Palmo's Opera House (later Burton's Theater and the Chambers Street Theatre) was a 19th-century theatre in Manhattan, New York, that was located on Chambers Street between Broadway and Centre Street. It was one of the earliest opera houses in New York before it was converted into one of the earliest Broadway theatres. The theatre was conceived by Ferdinand Palmo, an Italian immigrant and successful restaurateur in New York City. It was located inside the former Stoppani's Arcade Baths building. Modest alteration to the building was done in 1843 to convert the building into a theater.

In 1848 opera performances at Palmo's Opera House ceased and the theater was leased to William Evans Burton. It was rechristened the Burton's Theater and became a performance venue for plays and other theatrical entertainments. It operated under that name until 1856 when the theater was leased to Edward Eddy and it was rebranded again as the Chambers Street Theatre. The theatre operated under that name until it closed in 1864. The building was then leased to the United States Government, and was used as a Federal Court building until it was demolished in 1876.

== Palmo's Opera House ==
Palmo's Opera House, designed by John M. Trimble, opened on February 3, 1844 with a production of Bellini's I puritani with Euphrasie Borghèse as Elvira, Emma Albertazzi as Henrietta, and Michael Rapetti conducting. This was soon followed by performances of Bellini's Beatrice di Tenda and the New York premiere of Donizetti's Belisario. In April 1844 the theater staged Rossini's The Barber of Seville with basso buffo Antonio Sanquirico making his professional stage debut as Dr Bartolo. The following month the opera house presented the operas La sonnambula and L'elisir d'amore for their first presentations in the original Italian language in New York City.

The Fall 1844 season at Palmo's opened with a production of Rossini's L'italiana in Algeri with Laure Cinti-Damoreau as Isabella. The singer was later heard to rave reviews that season as Rosina in a revival of the company's production of The Barber of Seville. Also performed that season was Chiara di Rosenberg by Luigi Ricci and Gaetano Rossi with Rosina Pico in the title role.

In 1847 the Sanquirico-Patti Opera Company became the resident opera company at Palmo's Opera House. The company's first presentation there was the United States premiere of Donizetti's Linda di Chamounix on January 4, 1847, with Clotilda Barili in the title role and Sesto Benedetti as the Vicomte de Serval. The company went on to present the first opera by Giuseppe Verdi ever staged in the United States, I Lombardi alla prima crociata on March 3, 1847. Other operas staged that year at Palmo's included the New York premiere of Lucrezia Borgia and another staging of The Barber of Seville.

Despite making some notable achievements, the Sanquirico-Patti Opera company did not fare well financially against a new opera rival in the city, the touring Havana Opera Company, partly due to the much nicer accommodations and better production value at the Park Theatre where the Havana company was playing. In the Fall of 1847 the Sanquirico-Patti Opera Company left Palmo's for the newly built Astor Opera House. Faced with strong competition and mounting losses, Palmo ceased presenting opera at the house and the theater was leased in 1848 to William Evans Burton.

== Burton's Theatre ==
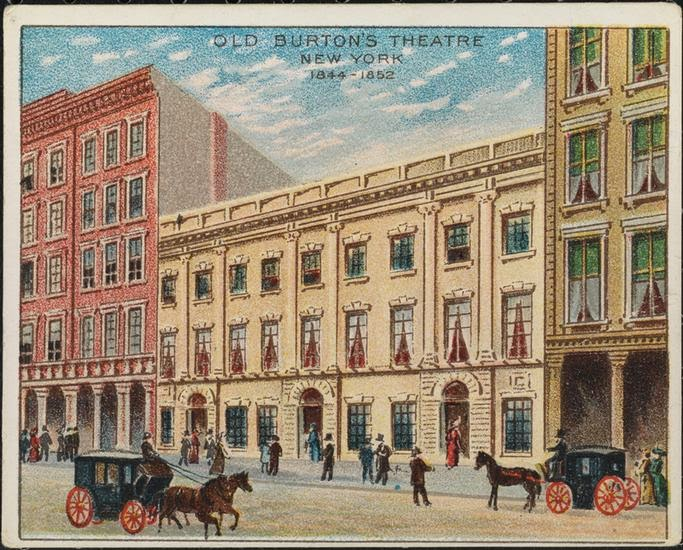
Colored lithograph from a cigarette card (c. 1910) of Old Burton's Theatre

Burton's Theatre opened on July 10, 1848, with a performance of the play Maiden's Beware!. Later that month Burton presented the world premiere of John Brougham's stage adaptation of Dicken's Dombey and Son with Burton as Captain Cuttle to great success. In July 1849 the theater presented Dion Boucicault's London Assurance with Fanny Wallack as Lady Gay Spanker. On December 3, 1849, the theater presented the world premiere of Morris Barnett's The Serious Family. In 1852 the theatre staged John Poole's Paul Pry with Henry Placide as Colonel Harding. The theatre also staged several plays by Burton, including the comedy Romance and Reality, the burlesque Pocahontas, and an adaptation of The Duke's Motto.

Burton assembled several notable performers of the era in his troupe at the theatre, including Rosa Bennett, William R. Blake, W. Humphrey Bland, Julis Daly, Edward Loomis Davenport, Jane Hill (later Mrs W. E. Burton), Josephine Shaw Russell Hoey, Mrs. Hughes, Mrs. George Jordan, John Sefton, Emma Skerret, Mary Cecilia Taylor, John Lester Wallack, and Lizzie Weston among others.

== Chambers Street Theatre ==
In 1856 Burton left for another theatre in uptown Manhattan and Edward Eddy took over the lease of the theatre which he renamed the Chamber Street Theatre.
