= Mrs. J. H. Allen =

American stage actress

Mrs. J.H. Allen
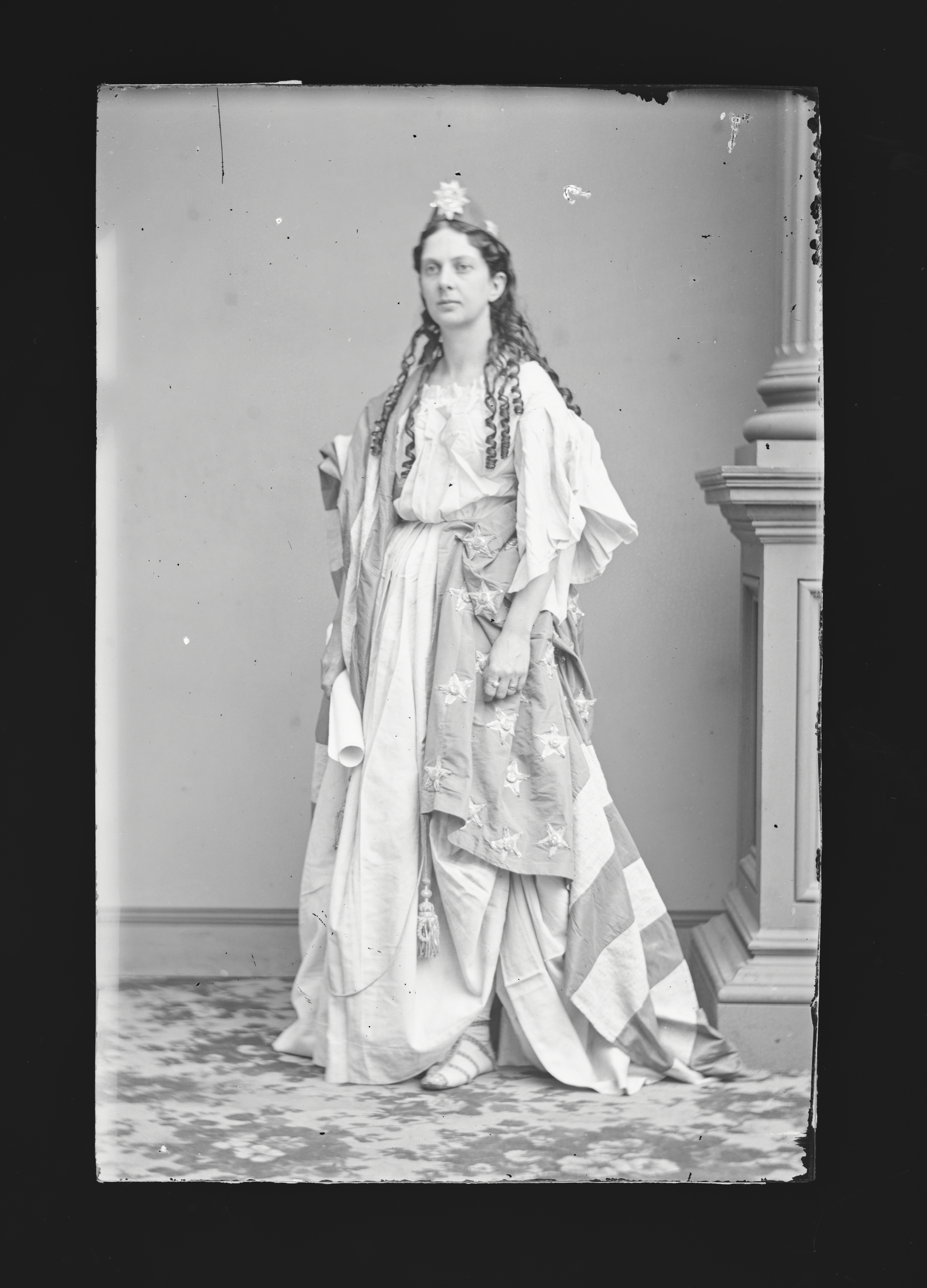
- Born: c. 1840
- Died: 1911
- Occupation: Actress
- Spouse: J.H. Allen

Louise Allen (c. 1840–1911) was an American actress active during the mid 19th century who was billed under her married name, Mrs. J. H. Allen. She was primarily active on the New York stage, and was principally active at Wallack's Theatre where she was popular with New York audiences.

== Life and career ==
Louise Allen was born in c. 1840. She was the wife of theater manager J.H. Allen and debuted on the stage in 1855. That year she appeared at the Metropolitan Theatre in New York City as Lady Percy in William Shakespeare's Henry IV, Part 1, and performed with her husband at Purdy's National Theatre in productions of A Morning Call, Michael Earl, Rose of Pekin, and Black Eyed Susan. She and her husband repeated their parts as Mr. and Mrs. Chillington in A Morning Call at Wallack's Theatre in the summer of 1856. Without her husband, Mrs. Allen appeared at that same theatre as Mercy in Edward Fitzball's The Miller of Derwent Water in August 1856.

Mrs. J. H. Allen returned to Wallack's Theatre as Ellen St. Leger in First Impressions (September 1856), Ophelia in Shakespeare's Hamlet (October 1856), Lady Helen in George Colman the Younger's The Iron Chest (October 1856), and an un-named role in Going to the Races (December 1856). In March 1857 she created the role of the Countess Helen in the premiere of a new play by Matilda Heron, Leonore, or the World's Own, which was staged at Wallack's. In June 1858, The New York Times described Mrs. J. H. Allen as "the most beautiful woman on the New York stage, and a lady who in a short time has assumed a prominent position as the leading actress at the principal New York Theatre", referring to Wallack's Theatre. She appeared in the 1859 melodrama The Octoroon, and in the popular 1860–61 extravaganza The Seven Sisters in New York.

Mrs. J. H. Allen died in 1911.
