= Olympic Theatre (New York City) =

Former theatres in New York City, United States

Coordinates: 40.717°N 74.005°W

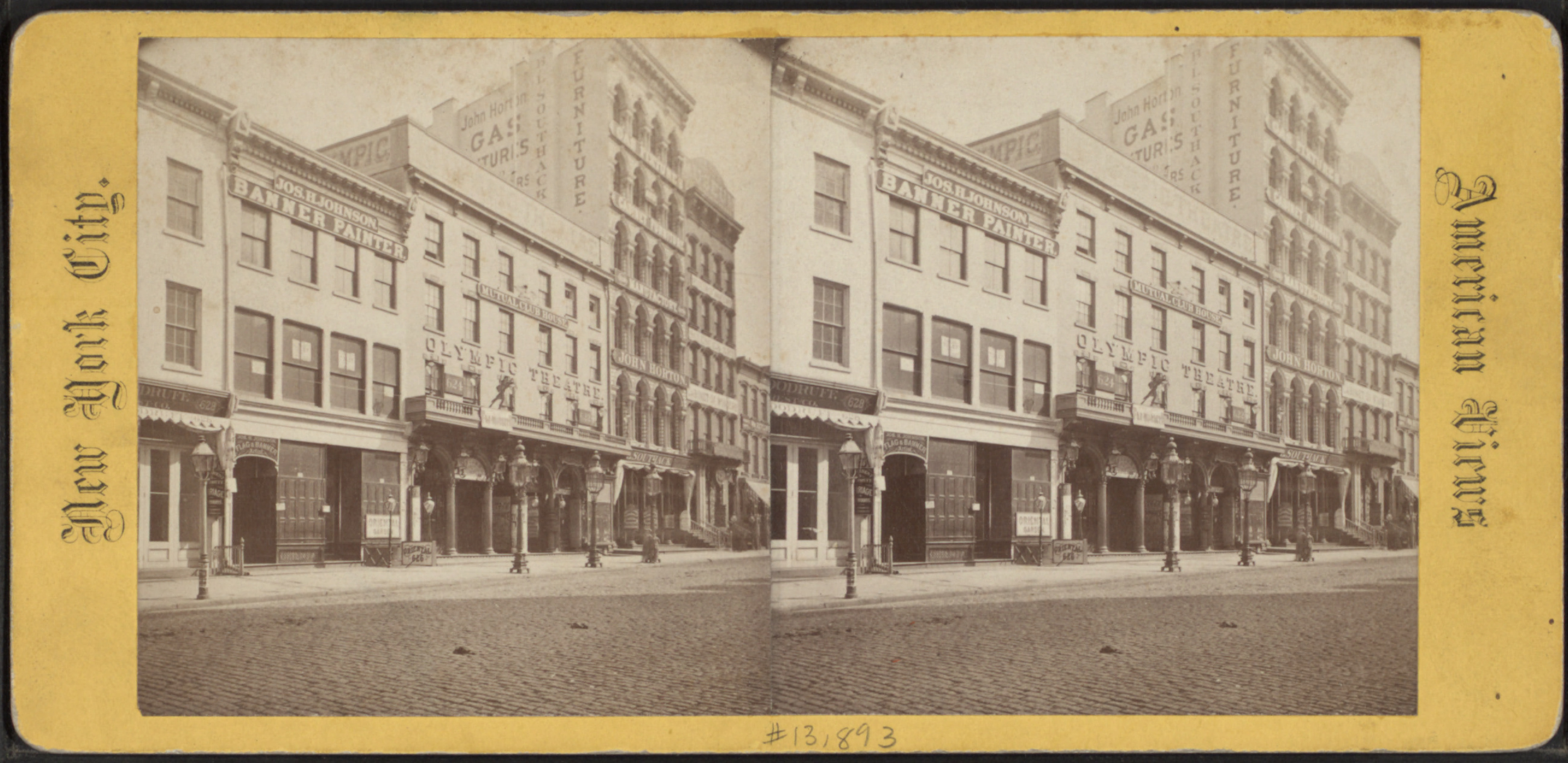
Stereoscopic view of the third Olympic Theatre (1856–1880)

Olympic Theatre was the name of five former 19th and early 20th-century theatres on Broadway in Manhattan and in Brooklyn, New York.

== First Olympic Theatre (1800–1821) ==
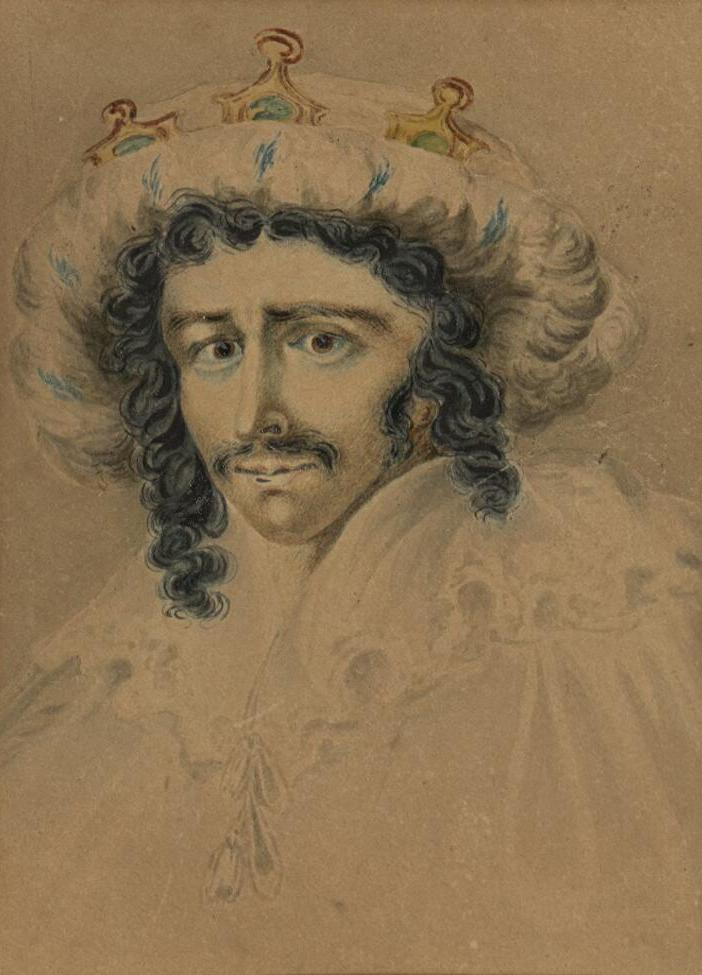
Portrait of Edmund Kean as Richard III, which he played at the theatre in 1820

Although perhaps best known as the Anthony Street Theatre, the first theatre in New York to bear the name Olympic (for only one year, in 1812–1813) was on 79–85 Anthony Street (later renamed Worth Street) in Manhattan. Converted in 1800 from a former circus building, it was named the Olympic Theatre in July 1812 under the management of actor-manager William Twaits along with Alexander Placide and Jean Baptiste Casmiere Breschard. Twaits and Placide had come to New York after the disastrous Richmond Theatre fire in Richmond, Virginia, where they had been co-managers of the Richmond Theatre. The Olympic was due to open with a production led by Charlotte Melmoth and Twaits, but while travelling to fulfil this engagement Melmoth was involved in a carriage accident, resulting in a severe fracture to her arm that failed to heal, forcing her to give up her acting career. Circus acts continued to appear there throughout this period.

The theatre was renovated and redecorated in 1813 when it was named the Anthony Street Theatre, becoming the Commonwealth Theatre in 1814 and the Pavilion Theatre in 1816 and reverting to Anthony Street Theatre in 1820. During the 1820–1821 season, the theatre was the home of the acting company of the Park Theatre while their own theatre was being rebuilt after having burnt down. With this company Edmund Kean made his first appearance to much acclaim in New York in Richard III. The theatre was demolished in 1821 shortly after the Park Theatre company left, following which the plot was bought for the Christ Episcopal Church.

== Second Olympic Theatre (1837–1852) ==
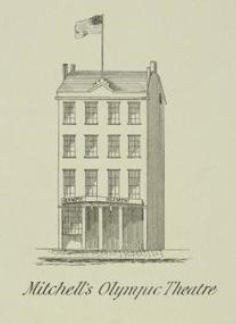
Mitchell's Olympic Theatre

The second Olympic Theatre was built on 444 Broadway, near Grand Street in Manhattan, in 1837. It was designed by the architect Calvin Pollard, who modeled it on the Olympic Theatre in London, which concentrated on Victorian burlesque, a form of theatrical parody, often of opera or classic plays. It was built by Willard and Blake, who struggled as managers and leased it, at first, to a series of even less successful managers.

In 1839 actor-manager William Mitchell took over the theatre and offered parodies and comic entertainments at reduced prices. The house became known as Mitchell's Olympic Theatre. One of his entertainments was Amy Lee, or Who Loves Best? (1839), a parody version of Amilie, or the Love Test. Noteworthy musicals produced at the theatre included 1940! (1840) and A Glance at New York in 1848 (1848). After his retirement in 1850, it became a German-language theatre and minstrel hall. The theatre changed ownership in 1852 and continued to operate as "George Christy and Wood's Minstrels". The building burned down in December 1854 in a fire that destroyed several connected buildings, across which the City Assembly Rooms extended on an upper floor.

=== Productions ===
- The Deep, Deep Sea (1835 and 1837) – musical play by Charles Dance and James Planché
- Sam Parr, with His Red Coarse Hair (1839) – burlesque version of Zampa, the Red Corsair, by William Mitchell
- Amy Lee, or Who Loves Best? (1939) – burlesque version of Amilie, or the Love Test, by William Mitchell
- The Strange Gentleman/The Roof Scrambler (1839–1840) – musical burlesque
- 1940! (1840) – musical extravaganza by A. Allan
- The Cat's in the Larder (1840–1841) – musical burlesque by James Henry Horncastle
- The Bohea-man's Girl (1845) – burlesque of The Bohemian Girl, by B.A. Baker
- A Glance at New York In 1848 (1848) – original musical

== Third Olympic Theatre (1856–1880) ==
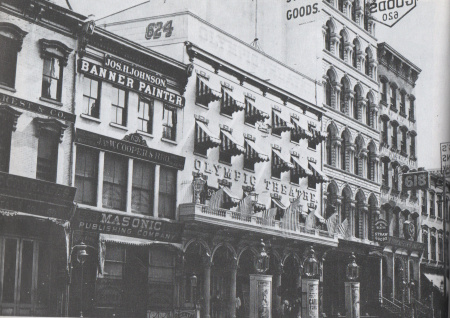
This Olympic Theatre opened in 1856 as Laura Keene’s New Theatre

The third Olympic Theatre was located on 622 Broadway, near Houston Street in Manhattan. It was built in 1856 to a design by architect John M. Trimble as Laura Keene's Theatre under the management of Laura Keene, a popular actress of the time. Keene had lost her lease on the Metropolitan Hall (Tripler Hall), and she relocated her Varieties to this theatre. The stage manager in the 1860s was Harry Eytinge. Many of Keene's productions had music by Thomas Baker and starred Joseph Jefferson.

Under Keene's management, the theatre saw a number of notable premieres including Our American Cousin in 1858 by English playwright Tom Taylor when the title character was played by Jefferson with Edward Askew Sothern as Lord Dundreary. Keene was acting in the play at Ford's Theatre in Washington, D.C., on 14 April 1865 when United States President Abraham Lincoln, in the audience, was assassinated by actor and Confederate sympathizer John Wilkes Booth. Other works to receive their premieres here included the melodrama The Colleen Bawn by Dion Boucicault (1860) and the long-running musical The Seven Sisters (1860–1861). In The Colleen Bawn, Keene played Anne Chute with Boucicault playing Myles na Coppaleen.

After Keene left in 1863 the theatre was renamed the Olympic and was managed by a number of actresses, including Mrs. John Wood (c. 1866). The theatre closed in 1880 and was demolished in the same year.

=== Productions (as Laura Keene's Theatre) ===
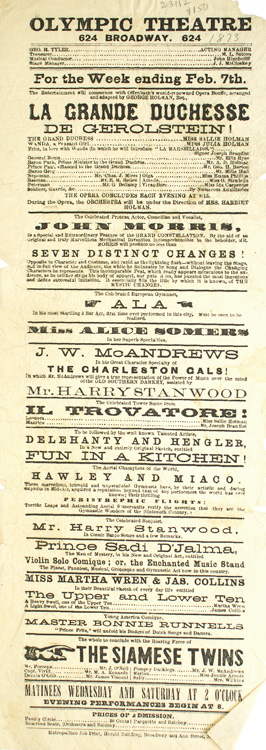
Broadside for the theatre, presenting Offenbach's La Grande Duchesse de Gerolstein (1873)

- The Elves (1857) – musical with music by Thomas Baker
- Mary's Birthday; or the Cynic (1857) – play by George Henry Miles
- The Heir at Law (1857) – play by George Colman
- The Lyons Mail (1858) – by Charles Reade
- Our American Cousin (1858–1859) – play by Tom Taylor
- The Colleen Bawn (1860) – by Dion Boucicault
- Jenny Lind (1860) – musical farce by Joseph Jefferson, with music by Thomas Baker
- The Seven Sisters (1860–1861) – original burlesque by Thomas B. DeWalden with music by Thomas Baker

=== Productions (as the Olympic Theatre) ===
- L'Assommoir (1879) – play by Augustin Daly
- The Scouts of the Plains; or, The Peril of the Frontier (1878) – western by Texas Jack Omohundro
- Bluebeard (1872) – pantomime by Henry Brougham Farnie
- Humpty Dumpty (1871–1872) – pantomime by Mon. F. Strebinger and George L. Fox
- Horizon (1871) – play by Augustin Daly
- Wee Willie Winkie (1870–1871) – pantomime with music by Mon. F. Strebinger; libretto by George L. Fox
- The Fair One in the Golden Wig (1870) – burlesque: Mrs Alice Oates and her company
- The Daughter of the Regiment, or the 800 Fathers (1870) – Mrs Alice Oates and her company
- The Field of the Cloth of Gold (1870) – Mrs Alice Oates and her company
- Little Faust (1870) – opera by Hervé: Mrs Alice Oates and her company
- Macbeth (1870) – music by Matthew Locke
- Hamlet (1870) – written by Thomas Cooper de Leon
- Paul Pry (1870) – play by John Poole
- The Writing on the Wall (1870) – play by John Maddison Morton
- Under the Gaslight (1869) – play by Augustin Daly
- The Streets of New York, or Poverty is No Crime (1869) – play by Dion Boucicault
- Uncle Tom's Cabin (1869) – play by George Aiken
- Hiccory Diccory Dock (1869) – pantomime by George L. Fox
- Humpty Dumpty (1869) – pantomime with music by Anthony Reiff; written by George L. Fox
- The Rose of Castile (1867) – opera with libretto by Augustus Harris and Edmund Falconer to a score by Michael William Balfe
- The Bohemian Girl (1867) – opera by Michael William Balfe and Alfred Bunn
- The Doctor of Alcantara (1867) – opera with music by Julius Eichberg; libretto by Benjamin Edward Woolf
- Fra Diavolo (1867) – opera with music by Daniel Auber; original French libretto by Eugène Scribe
- Maritana (1867) – opera with music by William Vincent Wallace; libretto by Edward Fitzball
- Rip van Winkle or The Sleep of Twenty Years (1866) – play by Dion Boucicault
- Po-Ca-Hon-Tas (1866) – musical with score by James Gaspard Maeder; written by John Brougham
- The Rose of Castile (1864) – opera with libretto by Augustus Harris and music Edmund Falconer
- The Bohemian Girl (1864) – opera with libretto by Alfred Bunn
- Brother and Sister (1863) – musical with score by Sir Henry Bishop; libretto by William Dimond

== Fourth Olympic Theatre (1908–1928) ==
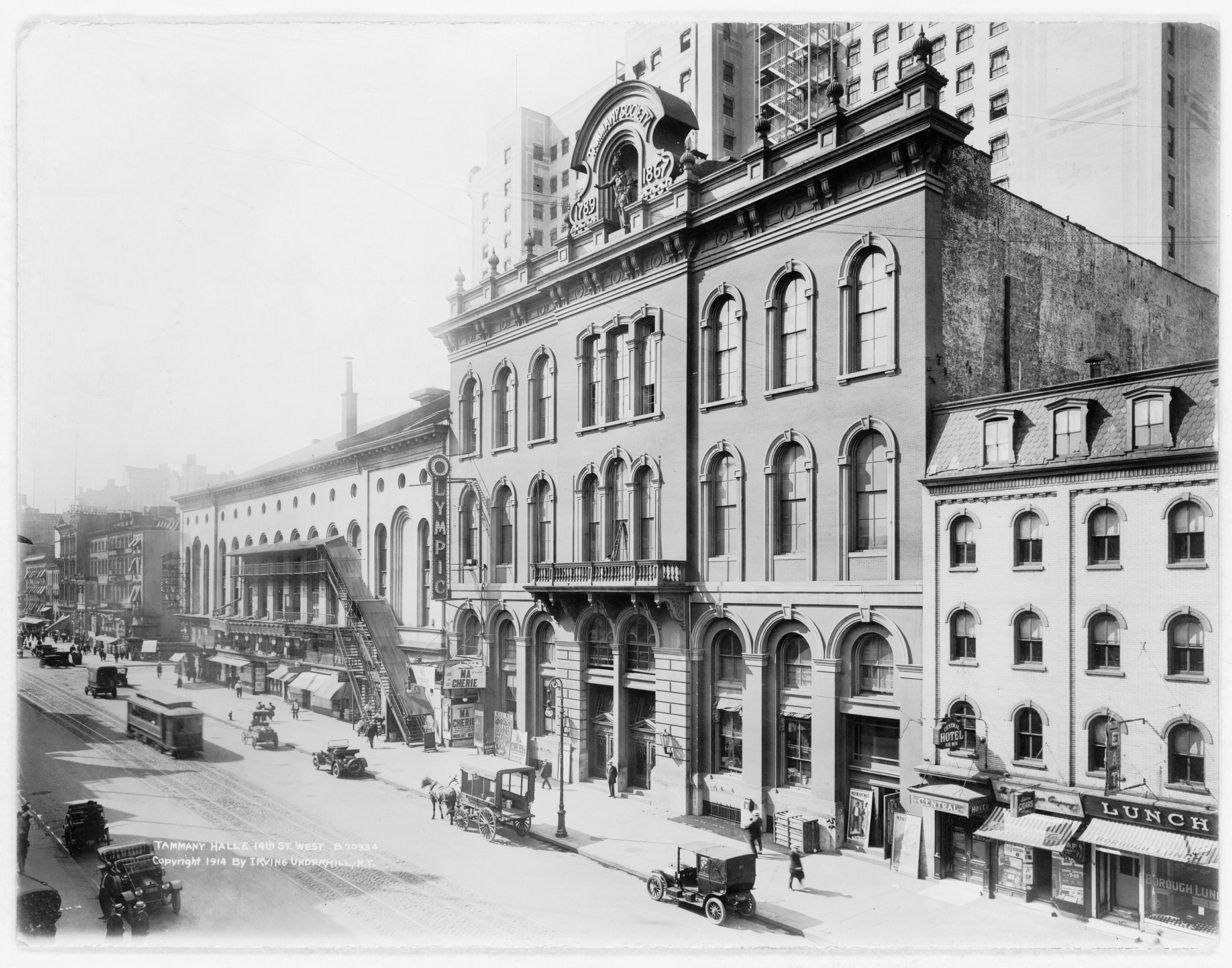
Tammany Hall on East 14th Street (1914). The building was demolished in 1928

The fourth Olympic Theatre in New York was located on 143 East 14th Street in Manhattan. Built in 1868 for the Tammany Society, the building had an auditorium big enough to hold public meetings, and a smaller one that became the Olympic Theatre. The structure was topped off by a larger-than-life statue of Saint Tammany. The smaller auditorium was renamed Bryant's Minstrel Hall in 1868 when it became the home of Don Bryant's Minstrels. After Bryant's Minstrels left, the theatre was leased to a German company:

Tammany Hall merged politics and entertainment, already stylistically similar, in its new headquarters. ... The Tammany Society kept only one room for itself, renting the rest to entertainment impresarios: Don Bryant's Minstrels, a German theater company, classical concerts and opera. The basement – in the French mode – offered the Café Ausant, where one could see tableaux vivant, gymnastic exhibitions, pantomimes, and Punch and Judy shows. There was also a bar, a bazaar, a Ladies' Café, and an oyster saloon. All this – with the exception of Bryant's – was open from seven till midnight for a combination price of fifty cents.

In 1881 Tony Pastor took over the lease, renaming the venue Tony Pastor's 14th Street Theatre and making the theatre New York's most famous vaudeville house during the 1880s and 1890s. After Pastor left in 1908 the theatre was renamed the Olympic and became a burlesque house until Tammany Hall was sold in 1928 and demolished in the same year.

== Fifth Olympic Theatre (1925–1927) ==
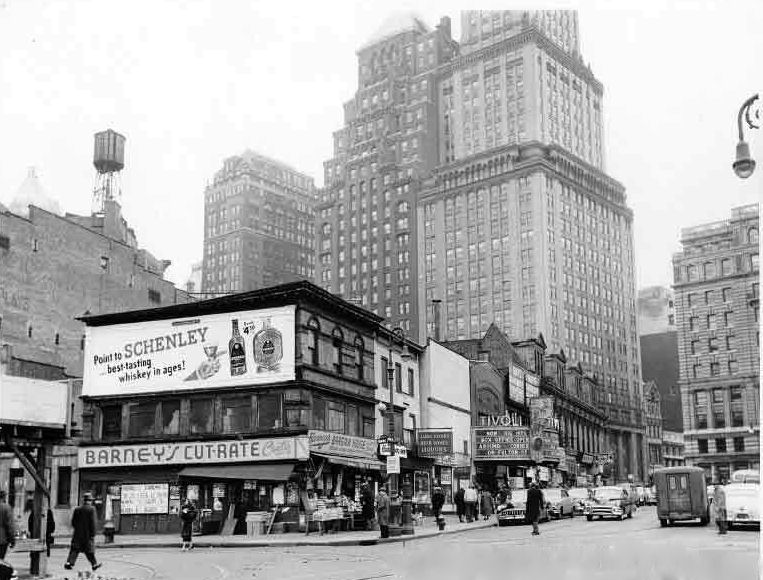
As the Tivoli Theatre in 1954

The fifth theatre in New York to bear the name Olympic was located at 365 Fulton Street in Brooklyn. Built by the impresarios Hyde and Benham, it was originally called Hyde & Behmans Theater and was one of the leading vaudeville theatres in America during the late 19th- and early 20th-centuries. This theatre was remodeled as the 2,000-seat Olympic Theatre, which opened on Labor Day, 1925. In 1926 an organ was installed in the theatre by the M. P. Moller company of Hagerstown, Maryland. In 1927 the Olympic became a movie theatre called the Tivoli Theatre. From 1942 the Tivoli was part of the Century Theatres circuit, and by 1950 it was operated by Liggett-Florin Booking Service. The Tivoli Theater closed in 1952 and, after being damaged by a fire in 1954, was demolished.
