= Laura Keene =

English actress (1826–1873)

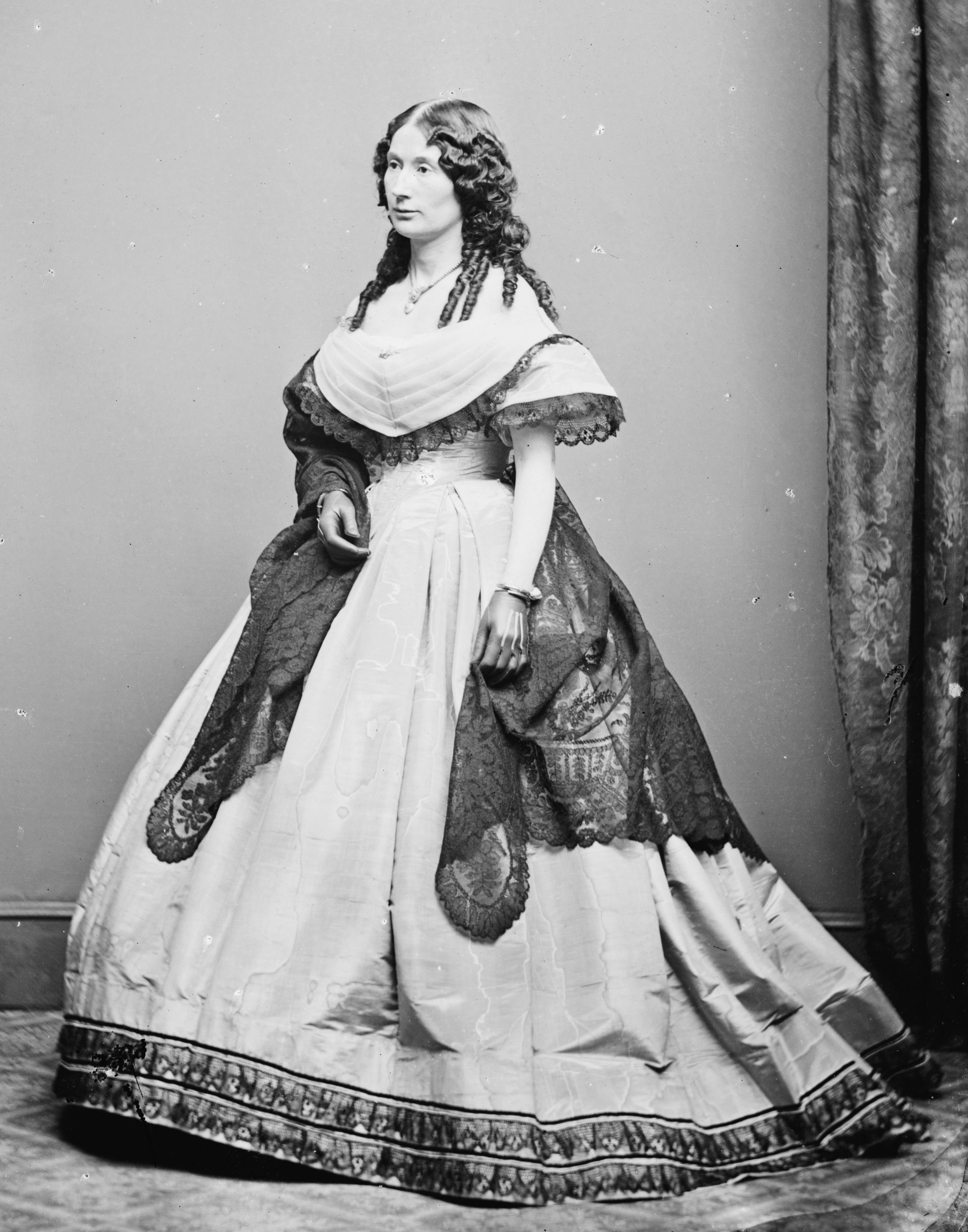
- Born: Mary Frances Moss; 20 July 1826; Winchester, England
- Died: 4 November 1873 (aged 47); Montclair, New Jersey, U.S.
- Resting place: Green-Wood Cemetery
- Occupations: Actress, theatre manager
- Spouses: Harry Wellington Taylor (m. 1844; died 1860) John Lutz (m. 1860; died 1869)
- Children: 2

Laura Keene (20 July 1826 – 4 November 1873) was a British stage actress and theatre manager. In her twenty-year career, she became known as the first powerful female manager in New York. Keene is also notable as the lead actress in the play Our American Cousin, which was attended by President Abraham Lincoln at Ford's Theater in Washington on the evening of his assassination.

== Early life ==
Keene was born Mary Frances Moss in Winchester, England. She was the fourth and final child of Tomas and Jane Moss (née King). Her aunt was British actress Elizabeth Yates. At the age of 18, she married British Army officer Henry Wellington Taylor (some sources identify Taylor as "John"). Taylor was reportedly the nephew and godson of Arthur Wellesley, 1st Duke of Wellington. The couple had two daughters, Emma (born 1846) and Clara Marie Stella (born 1849). After being discharged from the army, Taylor opened his own tavern. Around 1850, Taylor was arrested, though the nature of his crime is now unknown. After being convicted, he was reportedly sent from England to Australia on a prison ship. Keene would later travel to Australia in order to locate Taylor to divorce him but could never determine his whereabouts. (Some accounts say that Keene did find Taylor but he refused to consent to a divorce.) They remained married until Taylor's death in 1860.

After her husband was sent to prison, Keene was left alone with two children and no money. On the advice of her aunt, she decided to pursue a career as an actress, and would apprentice at her aunt's theatre. As it was then socially unacceptable for a woman with children and no husband to act in the theatre, she changed her name to "Laura Keene". Her now widowed mother Jane took over raising her two daughters.

== Career ==
Keene made her professional debut as Pauline in The Lady of Lyons in London in October 1851. This was followed by performances at London's Royal Olympic Theatre and Royal Lyceum Theatre, including several months working under Madame Vestris. In 1852, less than a year performing in Britain, Keene accepted an offer from James William Wallack to go to New York City, and serve as the leading lady in the stock company at his successful theater.

Her first performance at his theatre was in The Will as Albino Mandeville. She enjoyed great popularity during her time at Wallack's Theatre (20 September 1852, through 22 November 1853). In order to have greater control over her career, she then entered into theater management with the help of John Lutz, whom she married in 1860 and was with her for the rest of her career. She left Wallack's company unexpectedly one night and moved to Baltimore. Keene leased the Charles Street Theater, in Baltimore, from 24 December 1853, to 2 March 1854, where she acted as manager, director and performer. She started doing touring performances in California (6 April through 29 July 1854), in Australia (23 October 1854 through January 1855), and again in California (9 April through 4 October 1855). During the first stint in California, she was hired by Catherine Norton Sinclair to play opposite Edwin Booth. After spending a month as the manager and lessee of the Union Theatre in San Francisco (from 29 June through 29 July 1854), Keene and Booth toured to Australia. Booth's drunken behavior in Australia put an end to their relationship and their tour. On her return to California, she also managed the American Theatre. She managed and performed there for a few years until a new law was passed in California banning any form of entertainment on the Sabbath. This greatly decreased the attendance of theatre performances and gave Keene reason to leave and start a new project in New York.

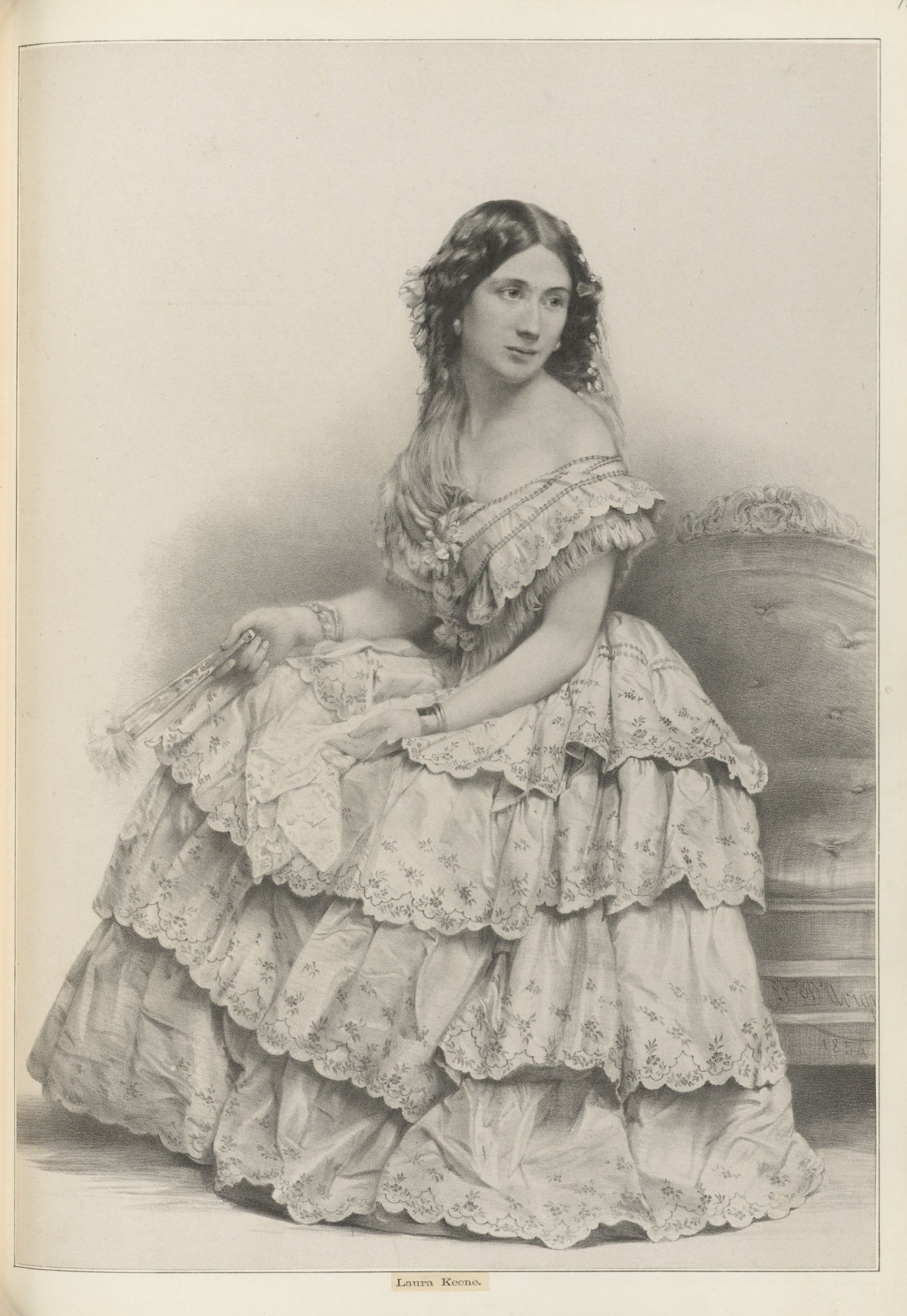
Keene as Florence Trenchard from Our American Cousin

Upon returning to New York City, Keene leased the Metropolitan Theatre, remodeled it, renamed it Laura Keene's Varieties. She served as manager, director and star performer until 23 December when William Burton, purchased the building, and moved his own operation there. (It was renamed Burton's New Theatre, and then the Winter Garden.)

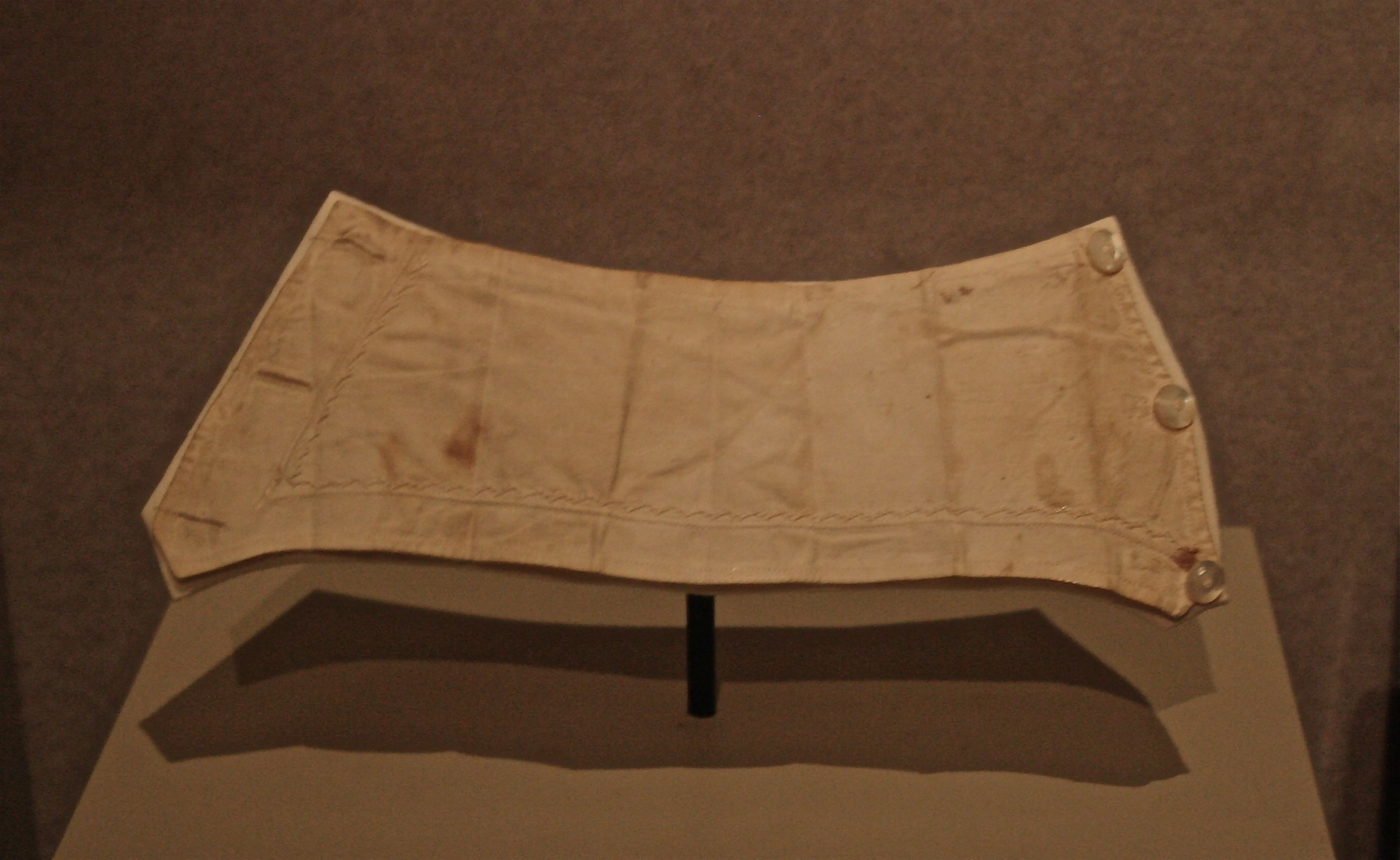
The blood-stained sleeve cuff belonging to Keene on display at the National Museum of American History in Washington, D.C.

At this point, she lined up investors, along with an architect who specialized in theaters, and a new theater was constructed to her specifications. Named the Laura Keene's Theatre, it opened on 18 November 1856. In November 1857 she put on The Sea of Ice to financial success.

Stage entertainment turned over quickly in that era, with few productions exceeding a dozen performances, but Keene bucked those odds. An 1857 show called The Elves ran for a record 50 performances. Moreover, 1860 was to prove itself an important year for her theater and American drama as well. On 29 March, she premiered Dion Boucicault's The Colleen Bawn, which ran for six weeks until the end of the season on 12 May; the highlight of this play was the creation of an ocean island on stage in a scene which culminated with the hero diving into the ocean to save the colleen bawn Eily O'Connor. (Betting on the play's success, Boucicault took The Colleen Bawn to London, where it opened on 10 September 1860 and ran for 230 performances, becoming the first long run in the history of English theater.) In November 1860, Keene premiered the musical The Seven Sisters, which featured extravagant sets and ran for 253 performances, an astonishing total for the time.

=== Lincoln assassination ===
On August 25, 1858, Our American Cousin debuted in Laura Keene's Theater. On the night of 14 April 1865, Keene's company, which primarily included John Dyott and Harry Hawk, were performing Our American Cousin at Ford's Theatre in Washington, D.C. In attendance that night were President Abraham Lincoln and his wife First Lady Mary Todd Lincoln. Actor John Wilkes Booth fatally shot President Lincoln while Lincoln watched the play from the presidential box; Booth then fled the theatre. Amid the confusion, Keene made her way to the presidential box where Lincoln lay dying and cradled the mortally wounded President's head in her lap. President Lincoln's fatal head wound bled on her dress, staining her cuff. The cuff was later donated to the National Museum of American History.

== Later years and death ==
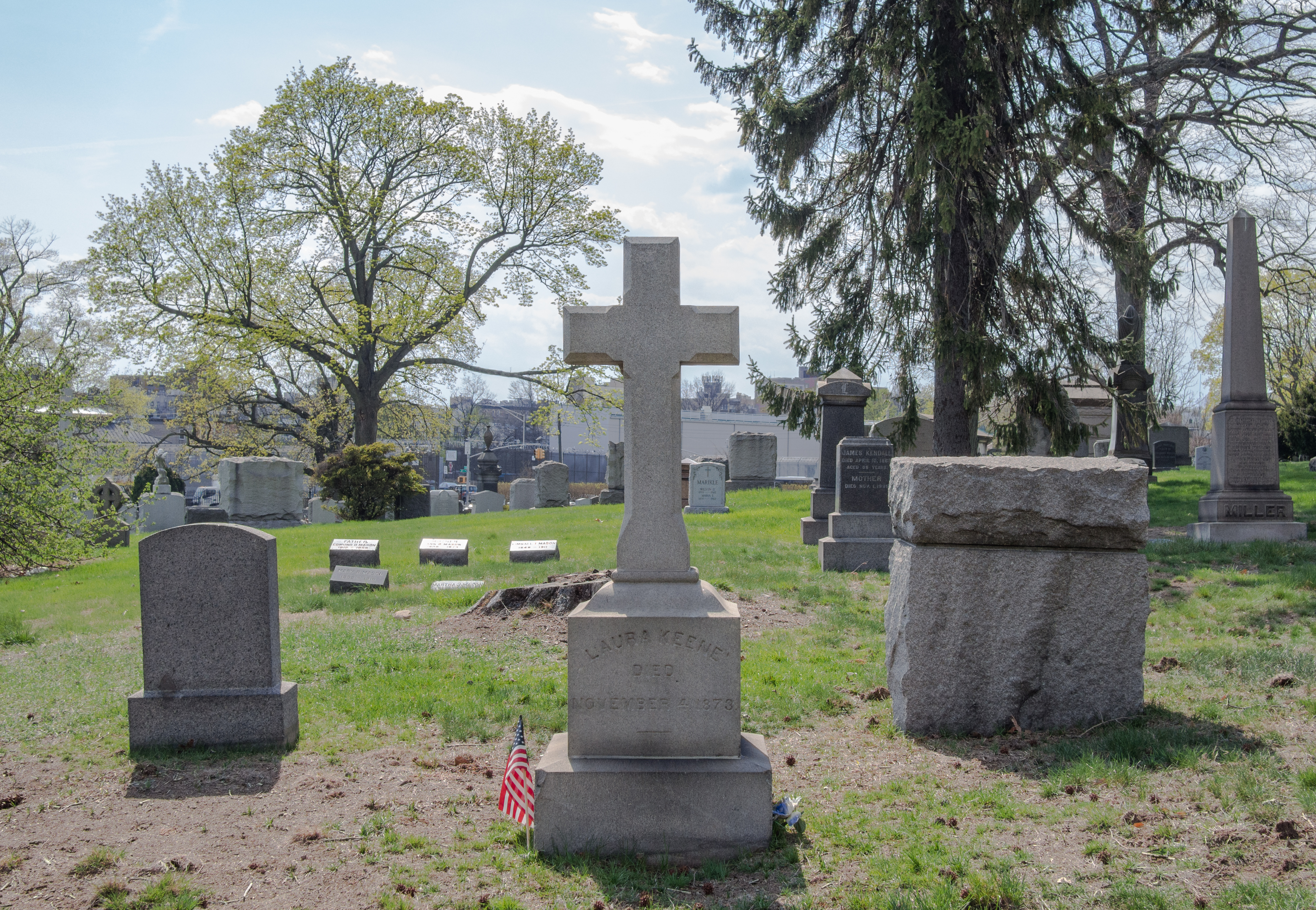
Burial site at Green-Wood Cemetery in Brooklyn, New York.

By 1863, Keene was forced to give up managing her own theatre due to poor health. Keene continued as manager and star of a company which toured the United States for most of the next ten years. She also served as manager of the Chestnut Street Theatre in Philadelphia, from 20 September 1869, through 25 March 1870. Her final performance was on 4 July 1873, while touring in northern Pennsylvania.

Keene's second husband, John Lutz, died on 18 April 1869. On 4 November 1873, Keene died of tuberculosis in Montclair, New Jersey, at the age of 47. She is buried in Green-Wood Cemetery in Brooklyn.

== In popular culture ==
Laura Keene is mentioned by name and portrayed by Olga Grey in the controversial American film The Birth of a Nation (1915) by D. W. Griffith.

In 2007, Our Leading Lady, a play by Charles Busch about Laura Keene and Lincoln's assassination, opened off-Broadway at Manhattan Theatre Club. The production was directed by Lynne Meadow and starred Kate Mulgrew as Laura Keene.

In 2023, Tyrants, an original musical about the life of Edwin Booth, was presented at the National Archives Museum in Washington, D.C. With music and lyrics by Alexander Sage Oyen and a book by Nora Brigid Monahan, the musical featured Jennifer Fouché as Laura Keene and dramatized her relationship with Edwin Booth, who was played by A.J. Shively.

In 2025, Cole Escola accepted the Tony Award for Best Actor in a Play for Oh, Mary! while wearing a pendant necklace bearing Keene's portrait.

== Sources ==
- Henneke, Ben Graf, Laura Keene: a Biography. (Tulsa, Okla.: Council Oak Books, 1990.) ISBN 978-0-933031-31-9.
- (IBDB) Laura Keene at the Internet Broadway Database
- Jefferson, Joseph The Autobiography of Joseph Jefferson (New York: The Century Co., 1889 and 1890) Chapter 7 (p. 183). Online at HathiTrust.
- Leale, Charles Augustus. Lincoln's Last Hours (Address), 1909.
- Sandburg, Carl. Abraham Lincoln: The War Years, Vol. 4, pp. 261–85 passim
- Vernanne, Bryan. Laura Keene: A British Actress on the American Stage, 1826–1873. (Jefferson, NC: McFarland & Company, Inc., 1997.) ISBN 0-7864-0075-7.
