= Placide =

Placide is a given name and surname. Notable people with the name include:

== Given name ==
- Placide Adams (1929–2003), American jazz double bassist
- Placide Bossier, American Civil War victim
- Placide Cappeau (1808–1877), French poet
- Placide Louis Chapelle (1842–1905), French-born American prelate
- Placide Gaudet (1850–1930), Canadian historian, educator, genealogist and journalist
- Placide Nicod (1876–1953), Swiss orthopedic surgeon
- Placide Nyangala (born 1967), Gabonese footballer
- Placide Poulin (born 1938), Canadian businessman
- Placide Tempels (1906–1977), Belgian Franciscan missionary
- Placide Viel (1815–1877), French Roman Catholic professed religious and mother general
- Placide Vigneau (1842–1926), French Canadian author

== Surname ==
- Alexander Placide (1750–1812), American actor and theatre manager
- Charlotte Wrighten Placide (1776–1823), American actress and opera singer
- Jane Placide (1804–1835), American actress
- Johny Placide (born 1988), French-born Haitian footballer
- Kenita Placide, St. Lucian activist
- Kya Placide (born 2004), Welsh bobsledder and sprinter

== See also ==
- Saint-Placide, places with the name
