= Caroline Placide Waring Blake =

19th-century American stage actress

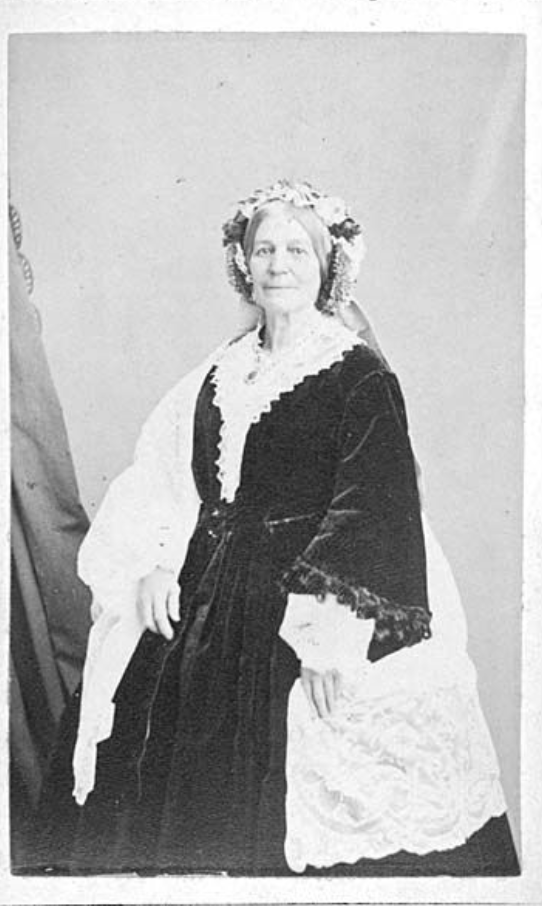
- Born: April 1798; Charleston
- Died: May 21, 1881; Long Branch
- Occupations: Actor, dancer
- Spouse: William Rufus Blake
- Children: Anne Sefton
- Parents: Alexander Placide (father); Charlotte Wrighten Placide (mother)
- Relatives: Jane Placide (sister)

Caroline Placide Waring Blake (April 1798 – May 21, 1881) was an American stage actress.

Caroline Placide was born in April 1798 in Charleston, South Carolina, the eldest of five children of actors Alexandre Placide and Charlotte Wrighten Placide.

French-born Alexander Placide managed the Charleston Theatre. Caroline Placide made her stage debut there at the age of three, playing one of the title characters' children in the pantomime Medea and Jason, and appeared in many other roles in Charleston and New York City throughout her childhood. Noah Ludlow later wrote "she was almost cradled on the stage."

In 1814, at the age of sixteen, she married the comic actor Leigh Waring. He died in 1816. They had one child, the actress Anne Duff Waring Sefton Wallack.

In 1824, she played a leading role in the premiere of the ballad opera The Saw-Mill; or a Yankee Trick by Micah Hawkins at the Chatham Garden Theatre. The Saw-Mill is often cited as the first American opera. Also appearing in the opera was a Canadian actor seven years her junior, William Rufus Blake. In 1826, she and Blake married. Over the next four decades they performed together and managed theatres in the US and Canada. Notable leading roles they played together include Sir Peter Teazle and Lady Teazle in The School for Scandal.

Her last stage appearance was at the Winter Garden Theatre in 1862. She retired after her husband died the next year.

Caroline Placide died on 21 May 1881 in Long Branch, New Jersey.
