= Suzanne Douvillier =

Ballerina, mime & choreographer (1778–1826)

Suzanne Douvillier (Madame Placide)
- Born: Suzanne Théodore Vaillande; 28 September 1778; Dole, Jura, France
- Died: 30 August 1826 (aged 47); New Orleans, Louisiana, United States
- Occupation(s): Ballerina, choreographer and mime
- Years active: 1792–1826

Suzanne Théodore Vaillande Douvillier (28 September 1778 – 30 August 1826) was a French ballerina, mime and choreographer. Known as Madame Placide during the early years of her career, she is considered by some historians as the first trained ballerina to dance in the United States.

== Early life ==
Suzanne Theodore Vaillande was born in Dole, Jura, France, on September 28, 1778. It is believed that her birth was illegitimate; her mother was Marie Reine Vailland (sic) but her father is unknown. Due to a lack of extant records knowledge of her childhood is almost entirely bereft of even the vaguest detail - all that is known is that she was educated in Paris and therefore it has been conjectured that her early ballet training was at the Paris Opera. As she entered her teenage years the French Revolution was underway, and she arrived in Santo Domingo (Saint-Domingue), then part of the French West Indies, around 1790; it was there that she encountered Alexander Placide, primarily a 'theatrical figure' though impressively multitalented, accomplished in such diverse activities as fencing, acrobatics, and the directing of plays. He would become a major professional (and, to some extent, romantic) partner and influence in her career.

== Career ==
In 1791 the duo moved to America after the Santo Domingo rebellion. Her debut came on January 25, 1792, at the John Street Theatre in New York City, in The Bird Catcher, a piece generally regarded as the first ever ballet performed in New York. She was billed as Madame Placide, though they were unmarried at the time. They remained there for some months, performing many ballets and pantomimes together. For the later part of 1792 they moved to Philadelphia and Boston, then in 1793 to Newport, Rhode Island, where they were joined by Louis Douvillier. In 1794 they moved south to Charleston, South Carolina. By then she was the most popular and talented dancer in America, and in 1796 became the first female choreographer in the United States by choreographing the ballet Echo and Narcissus, at the age of just 18. In June 1796 tensions between Douvillier and Placide came to a head - they had a duel over the affections of Vaillande. Despite the fact that Placide won, Douvillier married Suzanne and in 1799 they settled in New Orleans. She then started choreographing often, though continued dancing. In 1808 she became the first female to perform as a male in America; the opposite was quite widespread, though at the time this act was considered amazingly daring. In 1813 she started set design, and is said to be a pioneering female in this respect also.

== Later life ==
Her face became disfigured in later years, according to actor Noah Ludlow. Her final performance was in Don Juan in 1818; in it, she wore a mask which concealed this. She died in New Orleans in 1826 at the age of 48, outliving her husband by five years. The couple are buried in St. Louis Cemetery, New Orleans. She is seen as a pioneer in both the advancement of women's roles in society and in choreography.

== See also ==
- List of choreographers
- List of dancers
- List of French people
- List of people from New Orleans, Louisiana
