= William S. Caldwell =

American philanthropist (1821–1874)

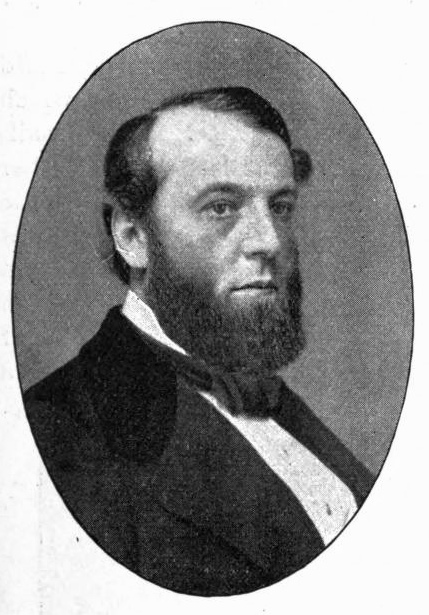
- Born: William Shakespeare Caldwell; February 11, 1821; Fredericksburg, Virginia
- Died: May 23, 1874 (aged 53); New York City, New York
- Spouse: Mary Eliza Breckinridge (m. 1853; died 1867)
- Children: Mary Gwendolin Caldwell, Marquise des Monstiers-Mérinville; Mary Elizabeth Caldwell, Baroness von Zedtwitz
- Parent(s): James H. Caldwell; Maria Carter Hall Wormeley
- Relatives: Waldemar von Zedtwitz (grandson)

William Shakespeare Caldwell (February 11, 1821 – May 23, 1874) was an American philanthropist.

== Early life ==
Caldwell was born on February 11, 1821, in Fredericksburg, Virginia. He was the eldest son of English-born American James H. Caldwell and Maria Carter (née Hall) Wormeley Caldwell (1784–1859). His mother was the widow of Warner Wormeley of Rose Gill. From that marriage, he had an elder half-brother, Dr. Carter Warner Wormeley. His father was a theatre actor and entrepreneur who owned the New Orleans Gas Light Company.

His maternal grandparents were Dr. Elisha Hall (family physician to Mary Washington) and Caroliana (née Carter) Hall (a daughter of Charles Carter, the longtime member of the Virginia House of Burgesses).

== Career ==
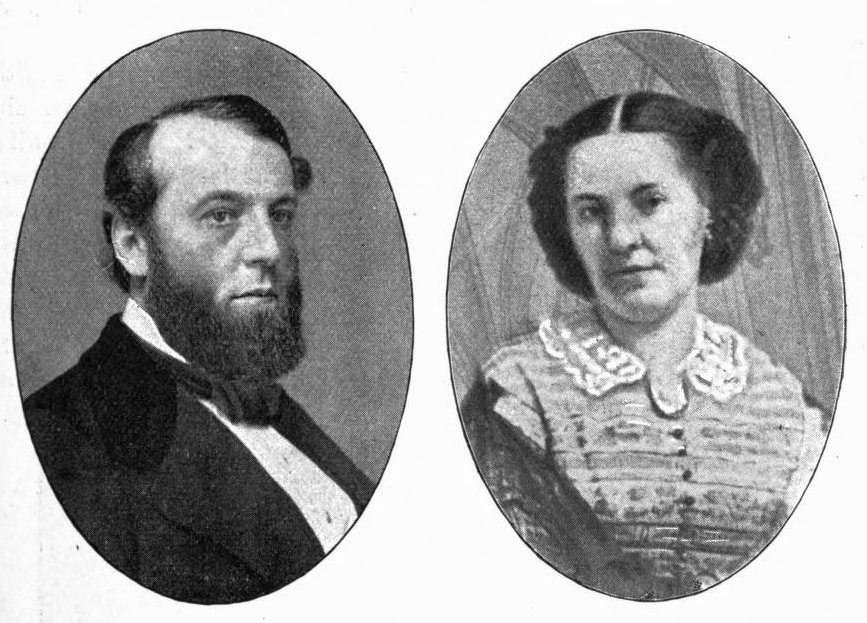
Mr. and Mrs. William Shakespeare Caldwell, The Catholic World Vol. LVI, No. 334, January 1893

Caldwell is considered "one of Louisville's first multimillionaires", he used his inheritance to acquire several large tracts of land in Louisville, including at Brook and Breckinridge Streets as well as parts of downtown Louisville and the land that became Bowman Field, Seneca Park and part of Cherokee Park. After the U.S. Civil War, Caldwell and his wife moved to New York City. At the same time, they bought an Italianate style cottage in Newport, Rhode Island on the southeast corner of Kay and Ayrault Streets that formerly belonged to Boston merchant Caleb Chace.

A devout Roman Catholic, he used his wealth, under the guidance of Cardinal James Gibbons, to establish the home for the charitable Catholic order Little Sisters of the Poor in Richmond, Virginia. In honor of his wife, who died in 1867, he funded the construction of the Sisters Mary and Elizabeth Hospital Louisville, which opened in 1874 shortly before his death.

== Personal life ==
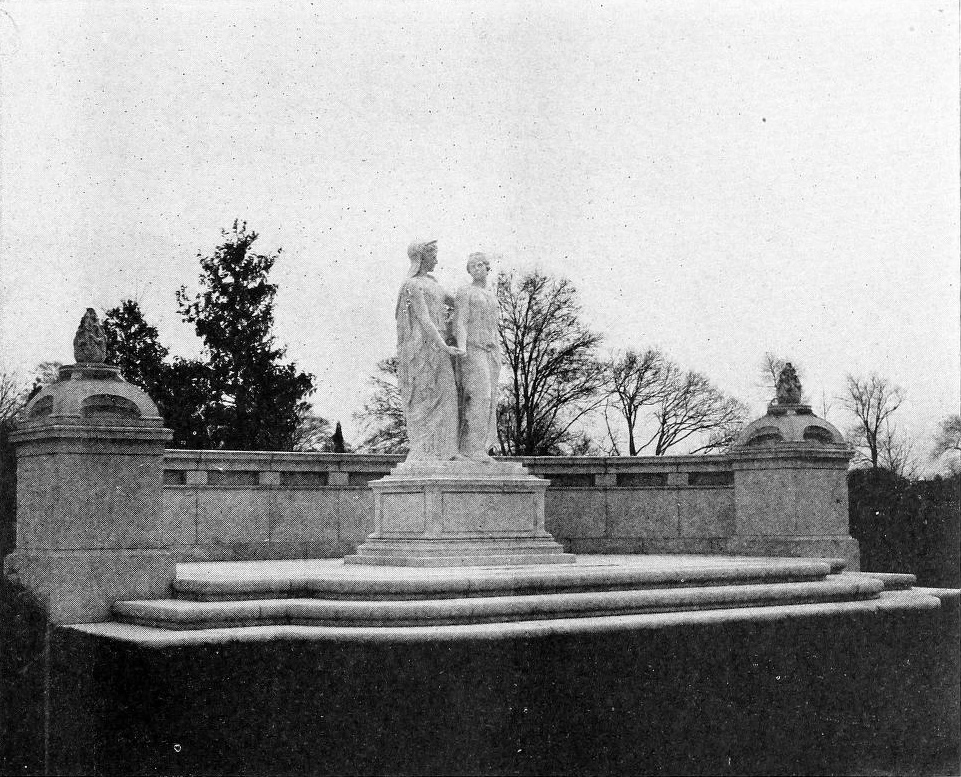
Caldwell sisters monument, Cave Hill Cemetery, in 1913.

In 1853, Caldwell married Mary Eliza Breckinridge (1830–1867), a daughter of Mary Eliza (née Grayson) Breckinridge and U.S. Representative James D. Breckinridge. The Caldwells had a mansions in Louisville, New York City, and Newport, Rhode Island. Together, they were the parents of:

- Mary Gwendolin Byrd "Mamie" Caldwell (1863–1909), who was engaged to Joachim, 4th Prince Murat, the grandson of the King of Naples Joachim Murat and Caroline Bonaparte (sister of Napoleon I). She broke off their engagement and married François Jean Louis, Marquis des Monstiers-Mérinville, in 1896. Despite giving to Catholic charities, she renounced Catholicism in 1904.
- Mary Elizabeth Breckinridge "Lina" Caldwell (1865–1910), who married Baron Moritz Curt von Zedtwitz in 1890. A German diplomat who served as Minister to Mexico and belonged to the old Zedtwitz noble family, which rose under the Electorate of Saxony, he died in 1896 when his yacht Isolde was rammed during the Royal Albert Regatta at Southsea by Kaiser Wilhelm II's royal yacht, Meteor.

Caldwell died in New York City on May 23, 1874.

=== Descendants ===
Through his daughter Lina, he was a grandfather of Baron Waldemar von Zedtwitz, a bridge champion who never married. In 1931, he sold the family's Newport mansion, which was torn down to make room for residential development. The John La Farge stained glass windows in the house which had been commissioned by the Caldwell sisters, were saved by Bishop James Edwin Cassidy for installation in the convent of St. Patrick's Church at Fall River. When the convent was demolished in 2004, the windows were acquired by Salve Regina University and returned to Newport.
