= St. Andrew's Hall =

St. Andrew's Hall may refer to:

== Buildings ==
- St Andrews Church Hall, Indooroopilly, Brisbane, Queensland, Australia
- St Andrew's Church Hall, Toogoolawah, Queensland, Australia
- St. Andrew's Market and Playground, Toronto, Canada
- St. Andrew's Hall, Singapore, at St. Andrew's School
- St Andrew's and Blackfriars' Hall, Norwich, England, UK
- St. Andrew's Hall, Charleston, South Carolina, US
- Saint Andrew's Hall (Detroit), Michigan, US
- St. Andrew's Hall (Glasgow)

== Other uses ==
- "St. Andrew's Hall", a song by Blind Melon from the 1996 album Nico
