= The Country Girl (1766 play) =

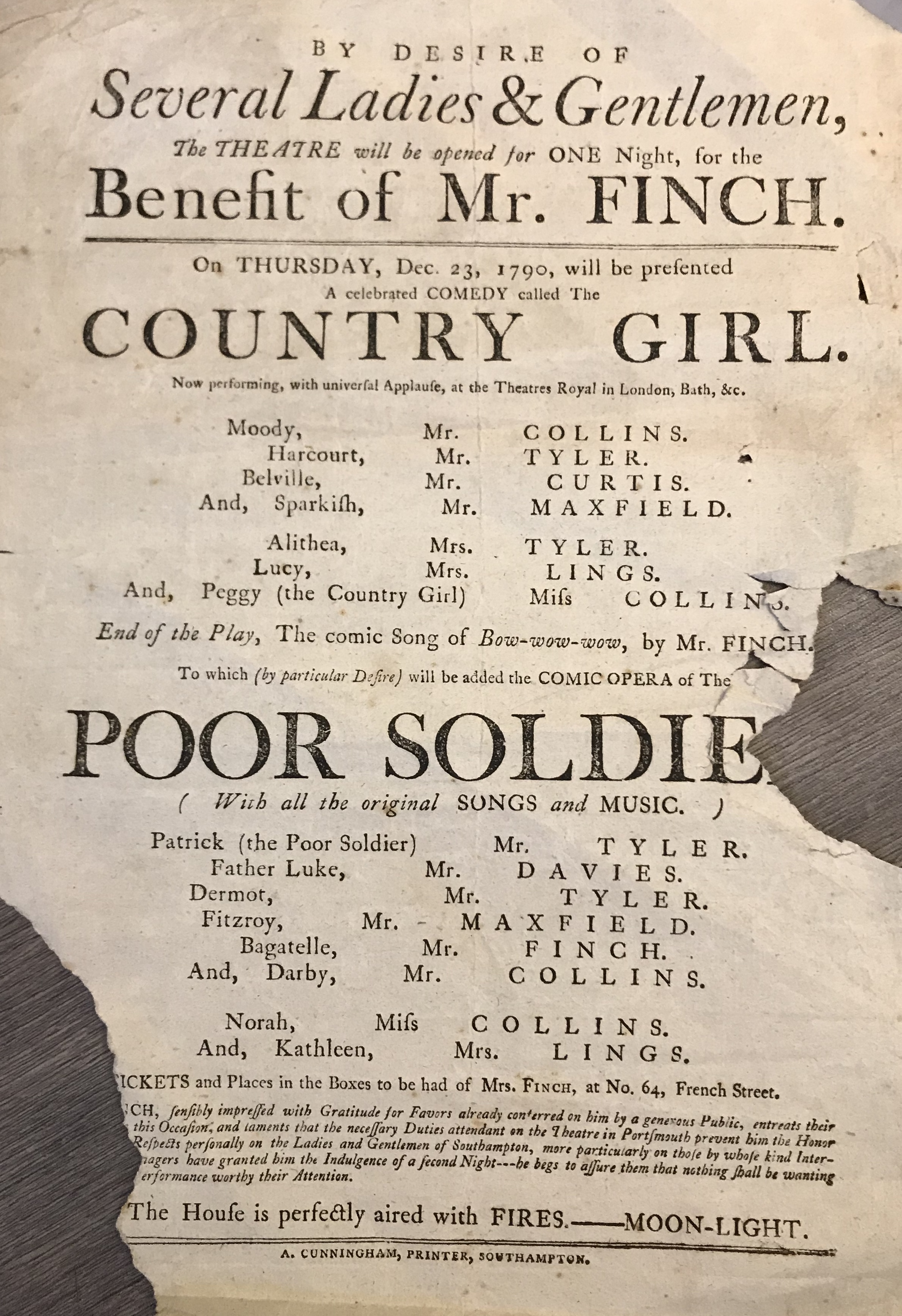
Playbill for a 1790 performance of the play at Theatre Royal, Southampton

The Country Girl by David Garrick is a derivative play adapted from The Country Wife by William Wycherley. By the time David Garrick adapted The Country Wife into The Country Girl, Wycherley's play was considered too raunchy and scandalous to show in theatres. In The Country Girl the plot and characters of The Country Wife are reformed to exclude elements of the play which, at the time, were considered immoral or in bad taste.

== Alterations from The Country Wife ==
In The Country Girl, the most significant changes to the plot result from the removal of Horner, who in The Country Wife pretended to be impotent in order to seduce the wives of other men, particularly Mrs. Pinchwife, the country wife whom Wycherley's play is named after. Rather than a plot focused on Horner's schemes and other raunchy elements, The Country Girl features the romance between the young aristocrat, Belville and Miss Peggy, an unmarried country girl who replaces Mrs. Pinchwife, and on Harcourt's wooing of Alithea who is engaged to Mr. Sparkish. Additionally, Harcourt, previously a less-than-reputable friend of Horner's, is rewritten as Belville's responsible uncle and mentor.

== Early Performances ==
The Country Girl was initially performed in 1766 at the Drury-Lane Theatre in Dublin. The playbill lists Mr. Holand as Moody, Mr. Palmer as Harcourt, Mr. Dodd as Sparkish, Samuel Cautherley as Belville, Mr. Strange as a Footman, Master Burton as a Country-Boy, Mrs. Palmer as Alithea, Miss Reynolds as Miss Peggy, and Miss Pope as Lucy.

The Country Girl debuted in London in 1791 with Mr. King as Moody, Mr. Palmer as Harcourt, Mr. Dodd as Sparkish, Mr. Whitfield as Belville, Mr. Spencer as a Footman, Mr. Jones as a Countryman, Mr. Alfred as a Servant, Mrs. Jordan as Miss Piggy, Mrs. Ward as Alithia, and Mrs. Williames as Lucy.

The Country Girl was first performed in America at a theater in New York in 1806. In the New York production, Mr. Harwood as Moody, Mr. Barrymoore once again as Harcourt, Mr. Twaits as Sparkish, Mr. Holland as Belville, Mr. Maddocks as William, Mr. Purser as the Countryman, Mrs. Jones as Miss Peggy, Miss Mellon as Alithea, and Mrs. Scott as Lucy.
