= Amelia Holman Gilfert =

American actress

Catherine Amelia Holman Gilfert (1789–1833) was an American actress and theater manager. She was referred to by contemporary critics as the first star of the American theater. She was the manager of the Charleston Theatre in 1823–24 and 1824–25.

== Career ==
A native of England, she was born to actor and manager Joseph George Holman (1764–1817) and debuted as an actress at the Theatre-Royal, Covent Garden, London in 1812. She and her father performed in April 1812 at the Georgian Theatre, Wisbech (now the Angles Theatre), managed by Thomas Shaftoe Robertson, as Cora and Rolla in Pizzarro on 8th, Desdemona and Othello in Othello on 10th, Lady Macbeth and Macbeth in Macbeth on 11th, and she played Lady Contest in the Farce of The Wedding Day the same night (this also being their benefit and last night). The handbills for these performances are among the hundreds of those in the collection of the Wisbech & Fenland Museum. Afterwards they left for the United States, where she spent her remaining career.

In 1812, she appeared with her father at the Park Theatre in New York City. Three years later she married German born composer and theatre manager Charles Gilfert (1787-1829). In 1822, Charles sold his managerial interest in the Charleston Theatre to his wife's trustee, Dr. John Dyott. Gilfert succeeded her husband as manager for 1823-24 and 1824-25.

== See also ==
- Charlotte Wrighten Placide
- Charlotte Baldwin
