= Secession Hall =

Secession Hall may refer to:

- Institute Hall, in Charleston, South Carolina, US, which became known as Secession Hall, which along with St. Andrew's Hall, Charleston hosted discussions in 1860 about secession from the United States
- Secession Building, an exhibition hall in Vienna, Austria
