= William Twaits (actor) =

American actor

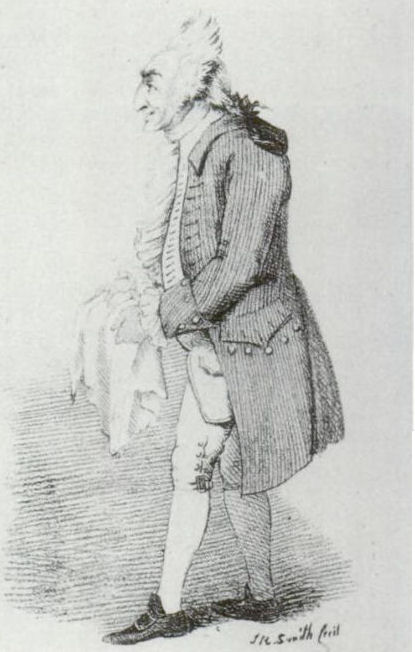
William Twaits as Sir Adam Contest in The Wedding Day - engraving by J. R. Smith

William Twaits (25 April 1781 – 22 August 1814) was a British singer, dancer and actor-manager whose career was mostly in the United States in the early 19th-century.

== Early career ==
William Dunlap, in his History of the American Theatre (1832) wrote of Twaits:

'Mr. Twaits was born on the 25th of April 1781. His father died when he was very young, and he obtained admittance behind the scenes at Drury-lane, through the influence of a playmate, the son of Phillemore (John Phillemore), one of the performers. Having determined to be an actor, he stuck to the point, as (George) Colman (the younger) says, "like a rusty weather-cock", and we suppose, like most of our heroes, ran away. He commenced acting at a place called Waltham Abbey… [he was] Short and thin, yet appearing broad; muscular yet meagre; a large head, with stiff, stubborn, carroty hair; long, colourless face, prominent hooked nose, projecting large hazel eyes, thin lips, and large mouth, which could be twisted into a variety of expression, and which, combining with his other features, eminently served the purposes of the comic muse - such was [his] physiognomy...'

Dunlap does not mention whether Twaits had any experience of acting in London, but The London Stage mentions two performances, separated by a year, held at Wheatley's Riding School in Greenwich. On 8 June 1798 he was among nine provincial actors who appeared in a benefit for five of them. Twaits played Glenalvon in Douglas and Tom Tug in The Waterman and also sang between the acts. On 17 May 1799 Twaits and some of the actors from June 1789 were back at Wheatley's in Greenwich where they performed She Stoops to Conquer (during which Twaits as Tony Lumpkin sang "a song in character") and The Agreeable Surprise. Next Twaits appeared in the Midlands, where according to Dunlap:

'he had been the Richard and Romeo of many a barn, when he had the promise of the highest salary in the company, nine shillings per week, and was obliged to be content with two-and-sixpence; when he feasted upon a hog's heart and vegetables (cost ninepence, baking a penny) for a week..."

Twaits was not given the opportunity to appear at any of the regular London theatres even though William B. Wood said Twaits was 'considered one of the best burletta singers in England'. Twaits joined the company of Macready (the Elder) in Birmingham; because of the scarcity of home-grown American actors Wood persuaded Twaits to join his theatrical company in Philadelphia at a salary of four guineas a week. Twaits made his American début at the Chestnut Street Theatre in Philadelphia in late 1803 as Dr. Pangloss in The Heir at Law where his success was so great that prints of him in the role were rapidly being sold all over the city. Twaits proved so popular with audiences that soon his salary was increased to six guineas a week.

== Success in America ==
After two seasons in Philadelphia Twaits moved to New York where he appeared at the Park Theatre in June 1805 as Caleb Quotem in The Wags of Windsor opposite the British-born actress Mrs. Elizabeth Ann Westray Villiers (1783-1813) as Leonora. The widow of Thomas C. Villers, a low comedian and theatre manager for Alexander Placide at the Charleston Theatre, and the sister-in-law of William B. Wood, in May 1808 she and Twaits were to marry. Twaits remained at the Park Theatre throughout 1805 in such roles as Megrim in Blue Devils; Dominique in Paul and Virginia; Stave in The Shipwreck; Shelty in The Highland Reel; Goldfinch in The Road to Ruin; Trudge in Inkle and Yarico; Ruttekin in Robin Hood and Dick Dsshall in The Way to Get Married. The remainder of the winter 1805–06 season was spent acting in Boston with Twaits returning to the Vauxhall Theatre in New York in the summer of 1806. Here he played Sparkish in the first American production of The Country Girl in 1806 in New York. He played Cosey in Town and Country when it was first performed in the United States in New York City on 2 November 1807 at the Park Theatre, with Thomas A. Cooper as Reuben Glenroy.

== Richmond Theatre fire ==
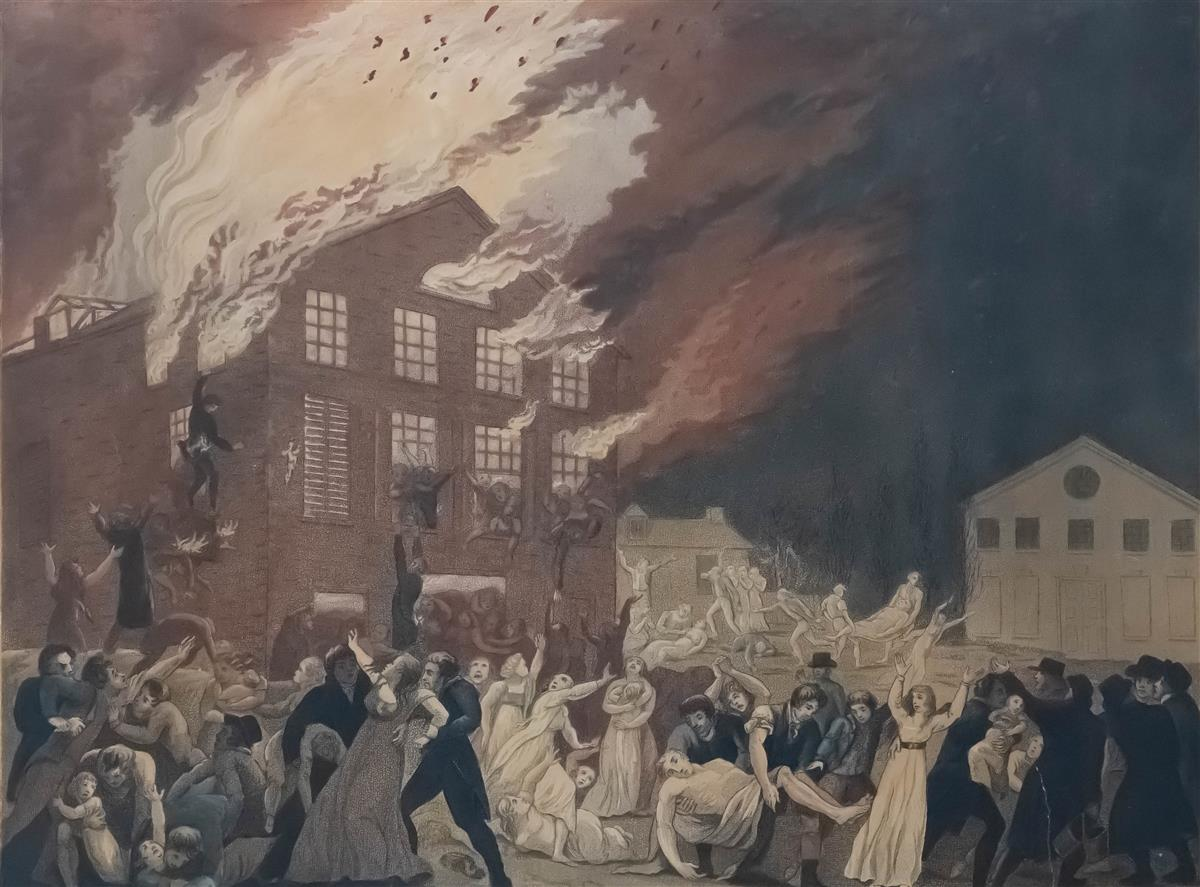
The Richmond, Virginia, theatre fire of 1811

Twaits was a manager-shareholder and a leading actor in the Richmond Theatre in Richmond, Virginia from August 1810 until it burned down on 26 December 1811. The Richmond Theatre fire killed about 77 people including many government officials and was the worst urban disaster in American history at the time.

The performance on the evening of December 26, 1811 at the Richmond Theatre was a benefit for Alexander Placide and his daughter. The benefit originally had been scheduled for December 23, but was postponed due to the death of one of the company's players, Eliza Poe, as well as Placide's own illness and foul weather. It being Christmas time and the last opening of the season, the auditorium on December 26 was packed with an excited audience of 598 people, with 518 adults and 80 children to view the pantomime. The disaster occurred when the candles on a chandelier accidentally set fire to the scenery which then spread quickly throughout the theatre.

On December 27, 1811, the Common Council commissioned a Committee of Investigation, which absolved the Placide & Green Theater Company of responsibility and blamed the inferior design and construction of the theater for the great loss of life. Following the fire Twaits returned to New York.

== Failure ==
In the coming years Twaits made frequent appearances at the Park Theatre and the Olympic Theatre in New York during the winter seasons until his death in 1814. In July 1812 he became co-manager of the Olympic along with Alexander Placide and Jean Baptiste Casmiere Breschard. Here Twaits decided to try his hand at tragedy, of which Dunlap wrote, 'Twaits seriously thought that his features were fitted for tragedy, and that he only wanted height to be like John Kemble'. He played Shylock in The Merchant of Venice; Lear in King Lear, and the title role in Richard III. However, his results were not a success with the Rambler for October 1806 which said of his Richard, 'Mr. Twait's peculiar physiognomy, his awkward gait, nasal twang, and petite form, all disqualify him from those parts where dignity of person, and gracefulness of carriage are essential concomitants.' When the 5 feet 1 inch tall Twaits tried to play Prince Hall in Henry IV his performance was met with derision by the critics.

== Decline ==
On 13 December 1813 Eliza Westray Villiers Twaits died; William Twaits' own health had been declining for some time and the death of his wife hastened his decline even further. Dunlap ascribed the death of Twaits to consumption but also dropped hints that Twaits enjoyed good company and strong liquor - so perhaps alcohol was the actual cause of death which occurred in New York in August 1814. William Twaits was buried in the graveyard of St. Paul's church in New York.
