= Charlotte Baldwin =

American actress

Charlotte Baldwin (1778–1856) was an American stage actress and theatre manager.

Baldwin was a popular actor as old women in comedies, notably at the Park Theatre, where she was engaged in 1816.

Charlotte Baldwin was one of the earliest female theatre managers in the United States. She was the founder and manager of the City Theatre, Warren Street, Broadway in 1822. She was not the first female theatre manager in the United states, but she was the first woman in the USA who founded her own theatre rather than inheriting one.

== See also ==
- Charlotte Wrighten Placide
- Amelia Holman Gilfert
