= Thomas Wade West =

American actor

Thomas Wade West (died 1799), was an American (originally English) actor and theatre manager.

West broke the monopoly of the Old American Company in 1790 by founding the Virginia Company in Richmond (also called Virginia Comedians and South Carolina Company), which toured Virginia and the Carolinas. He founded several theatres and was the manager of the Charleston Theatre and the Richmond Theatre. He owned and operated profitable seasonal theaters in Alexandria, Charleston, Fredericksburg, Norfolk, and Petersburg. He also designed mechanical scenery. West's operation in Richmond, Virginia, was destroyed in the Richmond Theatre fire on December 26, 1811. He had raised money from subscribers to construct the building.

West was married to Margaretta Sully West, father of Ann West Bignall and father-in-law of John Bignall.
