= Margaretta Sully West =

American actress

Margaret Sully West or Margaretta Sully West, née Sully, (d. 1810), was an American stage actress and theater director. She was the director of the Virginia Comedians and as such the leader of the theatrical activity within contemporary Virginia.

== Life ==
Margaret Sully West was married to Thomas Wade West, mother of Ann West Bignall and mother-in-law of John Bignall.

Her spouse, in companionship with Thomas Bignall, had broken the theater monopoly of the Old American Company in 1790 by establishing the Virginia Comedians. The Virginia Comedians established the so called "Virginia circuit", and regularly performed in Richmond-Fredericksburg-Charleston (1794)-Norfolk (1795)-Petersburg (1796)- Alexandria (1797), cities where they also constructed playhouses.

Margaret Sully West took over the management of the Virginia Comedians when she was widowed in 1799, and as such played an important role, being the managing director of one of few theater companies existent in America at the time, as well as one of the larger and more successful. Alongside the company of Thomas Wignell and Owen Morris, who had broken off from the Old American Company to establish their own theater company in 1791, Margaret Sully West played a pioneering role in expanding theatrical activity in the Southeastern Seaboard in the early 19th century.
