= James D. Breckinridge =

American politician (1781–1849)

James Douglas Breckinridge

Member of the U.S. House of Representatives from Kentucky's 8th district
- In office November 21, 1821 – March 3, 1823
- Preceded by: Wingfield Bullock
- Succeeded by: Richard A. Buckner

Member of the Kentucky House of Representatives
- In office 1809–1811

Personal details
- Born: 1781 Woodville, Kentucky, U.S.
- Died: May 6, 1849 (aged 67–68) Louisville, Kentucky, U.S.
- Resting place: St. Louis Cemetery; Louisville, Kentucky, U.S.
- Party: Democratic-Republican
- Spouse(s): Mary Eliza Grayson (died 1830) Lucy Fry Speed (m. 1845; died 1849)
- Relatives: Breckinridge family

James Douglas Breckinridge (1781 – May 6, 1849) was a U.S. representative from Kentucky. He was a member of the noted Breckinridge family.

== Early life ==
Breckinridge was born in Woodville, Kentucky, in 1781. He attended Washington College (now Washington and Lee University) in Lexington, Virginia, from 1800 to 1803, where he studied law. After completing his studies, he was admitted to the bar and opened a law practice in Louisville, Kentucky.

== Career ==
Breckinridge served as member of the Kentucky House of Representatives from 1809 to 1811. He was appointed judge by Governor Joseph Desha in April 1826, but declined to serve.

Breckinridge was elected as a Democratic-Republican to the 17th Congress to fill the vacancy caused by the death of United States Representative Wingfield Bullock (November 21, 1821 – March 3, 1823). His campaign in 1822, at the end of that term, for election in his own election to the 18th Congress was unsuccessful. Following his leaving Congress, he resumed the practice of law.

== Personal life ==
Breckinridge was twice married. His first marriage was to Mary Eliza Grayson, a daughter of Benjamin Grayson and Caroline Malinda (née Taylor) Grayson. Her brother was Peter W. Grayson, a politician in the Republic of Texas. Before her death in 1830, they were the parents of:

- Caroline Jane Breckinridge (1827–1829), who died young.
- Mary Eliza Breckinridge (1830–1867), who married William Shakespeare Caldwell, a son of James H. Caldwell.

In 1845, Breckinridge married Lucy Fry Speed, a daughter of John Speed.

Breckinridge died in Louisville, Kentucky, on May 6, 1849.

U.S. House of Representatives
Preceded by Wingfield Bullock	Member of the U.S. House of Representatives from Kentucky's 8th congressional district 1821–1823	Succeeded by Richard A. Buckner
