= St. Andrew's Society of Charleston, South Carolina =

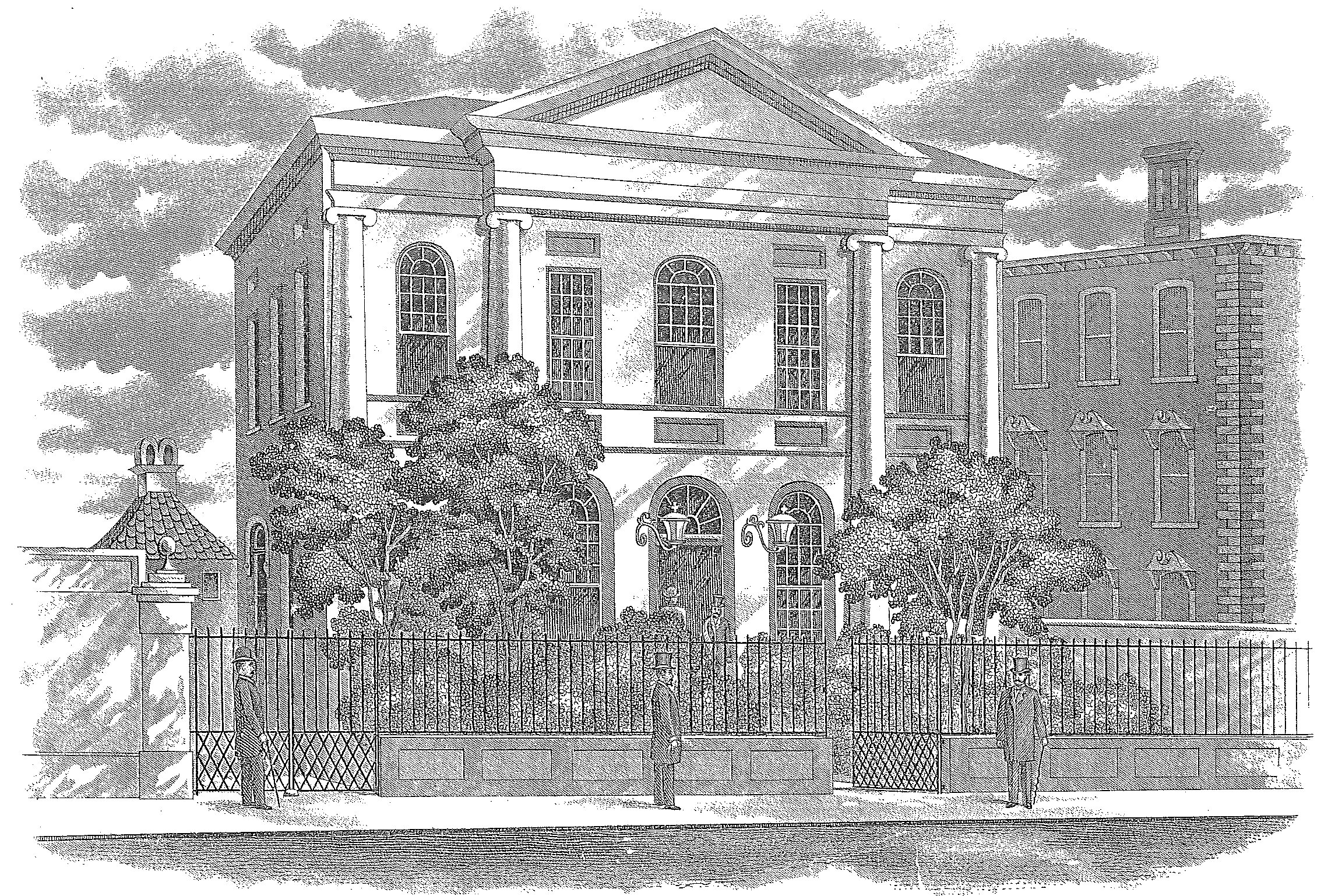
St. Andrew's Hall, former meeting place of the Society until burned in 1861, secession was voted on here

The St. Andrew's Society of Charleston, South Carolina is a social and charitable organization located in Charleston, South Carolina and was founded by gentlemen Scottish immigrants to the American South in 1729. It is a charitable organization that gives assistance to orphans, widows, and people needing financial assistance in the Charleston area. The St. Andrew's Society of Charleston is the oldest Scottish society of its type in the world.

The main archive of the Society's papers are held at the College of Charleston's Special Collections department. A portion of records from the archive have been made publicly available through the Lowcountry Digital Library.

== History ==
The Society was formed by Scottish immigrants to South Carolina on November 30th, 1729, named after the patron saint of Scotland, Saint Andrew. The founding principle was "to promote some public good by the joint endeavors of a number of people." Annually, the Society hosts a banquet on November 30th to celebrate St. Andrew's Day and the founding of the Society.

The St. Andrew's Hall building became the Society's headquarters after construction was finished in 1815. The building was later destroyed by a fire in 1861.

== Organizational leadership ==
Alexander Skene, Esq., John Fraser, James Crokatt, James Græme, Walter Burn were the first officers for the St. Andrew's Society were elected on November 30th, 1730, after the adoption of a club constitution and by-laws.

There were several committees within the Society, including but not limited to the Committee on Charity (Note: Sometimes also called the Committee on Relief), the Committee on Schools (School Funds), the Fundraising Committee, the Committee on Accounts, and the Committee on Stewards. Typically members are upper class philanthropists, and notable members of South Carolina history have been members and officers of the Society.

=== Notable members and officers ===
- William Ashmead Courtenay (Honorary Member)
- Mitchell Campbell King and his father, who served as President
- John Moultrie, Jr. (politician)
- Oconostota
- James Glen
- William Lyttelton, 1st Baron Lyttelton
- Alexander Hewat

== Presidents ==
Presidents of the St. Andrew's Society from historical records include:

- Alexander Skene – 1st President (1730-1740)
- James Abercromby – 2nd President (1740-1745)
- John Cleland – 3rd President (1745-1760)
- John Moultrie – 4th President (1760-1771)
- John Stuart – 5th President (1772-1775) (Note: Between 1775 and 1780, there are minimal records for Presidents and officers due to the ongoing American Revolution, including the Battle of Sullivan's Island. The next Presidency is recorded in November 1780, after the Siege of Charleston. Due to this lack of record, enumeration will continue in order.)
- James Simpson – 6th President (1780-1781)
- James Moncrief – 7th President (1781-1787)
- William Moultrie – 8th President (1787-1790)
- Dr. Alexander Baron – 9th President (1790-1819)
- Adam Tunno – 10th President (1819-1833)
- Mitchell King – 11th President (1833-1835)
- James Robertson – 12th President (1835-1847)
- Andrew McDowall – 13th President (1847-1859)
- Robert Mure – 14th President (1859-1871)
- Wilmot Gibbes DeSaussure – 15th President (1871-1886)
- James Allan – 16th President (1886-1891)
- A. S. Johnston – 17th President (1891-1893)
- Alexander W. Marshall – 18th President (1893-1906)
- J. Bachman Chisolm – 19th President (1906-1909)
- William C. Miller – 20th President (1909-1912)
- George H. Moffett – 21st President (1912-1918)
- Alexander Marshall – 22nd President (1918-1919)
- Moultrie Rutledge Rivers – 23rd President (1919-1925)
- Oliver J. Bond – 24th President (1925-1927)
- I'On L. Rhett – 25th President (1927-1928)

== Charitable assistance ==
Historically, to receive assistance from the St. Andrew's Society, people needed to send a letter requesting charitable assistance describing their financial situation. Any person needing immediate assistance could get assistance, so long as the sum was under twenty dollars. Examples of reasons for requesting charitable assistance from St. Andrew's include being widowed, age, illness, and loss of possessions. The Society funded any request for charity that was reasonable and could be resourced.

Formal requests for financial assistance from the Society could come from the recipients themselves or could be nominated by members within the Society. These applications for aid were first routed through the Committee on Charity for review. Then, the general body of membership would vote on people needing charitable assistance. Once accepted, the person be delivered relief funds from a member of the Society (often the treasurer).

Revenues that were used for charitable assistance to the public were collected through new membership fees and dues, contributions, and fundraising.

== See also ==
- St. Andrew's Hall, Charleston
