= Saint-Placide =

Saint-Placide may refer to:

- Saint-Placide, Quebec
- Saint-Placide (Paris Metro)
- Saint Placidus (disambiguation)
