= William Rufus Blake =

Canadian actor (1805–1863)

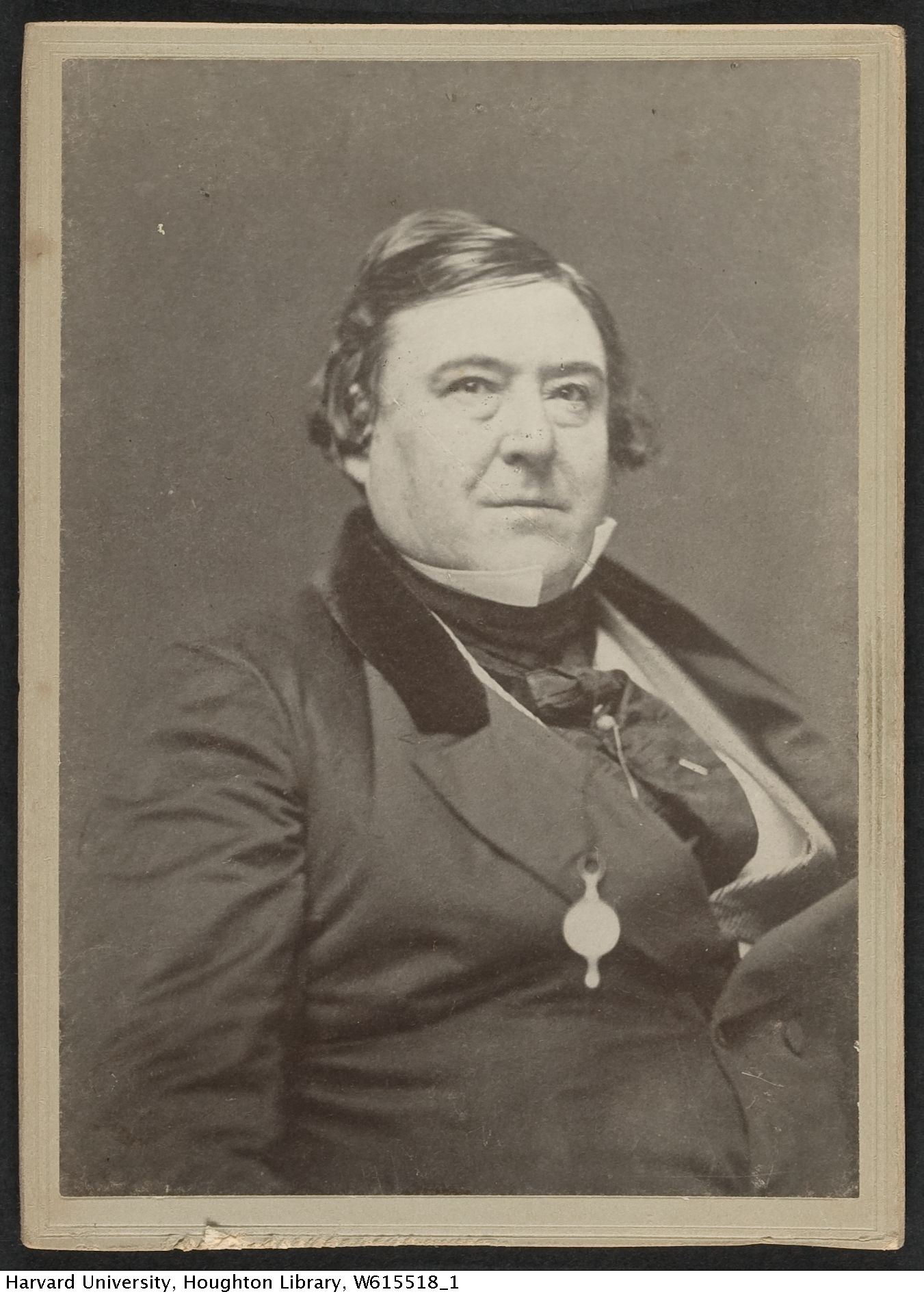
William Rufus Blake

William Rufus Blake (1805 – 22 April 1863) was a Canadian stage actor.

== Biography ==
Blake was born in Halifax, Nova Scotia, of Irish background, his parents being William Blake and Charlotte Herring. He was their eldest child, and was baptised on 5 December 1802 at Halifax, Nova Scotia.

When only seventeen years old he went on the stage at Halifax, N. S., taking the part of the Prince of Wales, in Richard III with a company of strolling players. His first appearance in New York was in 1824, at the old Chatham Theatre, as Frederick, in The Poor Gentleman, and in The Three Singles. While playing at the Tremont Theatre, Boston, in 1827, he received the first call before the curtain ever given to an actor in this country. In 1839 he visited England, making his first appearance there in the Haymarket Theatre, London. On 21 April 1863, while playing Sir Peter Teazle in The School for Scandal in the Boston Theatre he was suddenly taken ill, and died the next day.

Blake excelled in the portrayal of old men. One of his best characters was that of Jesse Rural in Old Heads and Young Hearts. He was, at different times, manager of the Pearl Street Theatre in Albany, New York; stage manager of the Tremont Theatre in Boston; joint manager of the Walnut Street Theatre in Philadelphia; and stage manager of the Broadway Theatre in New York. He died at Boston, Massachusetts.

== Family ==
His wife, Caroline Placide, widow of Leigh Waring, was an actress. They had one son.

== Works ==
He was the author of several plays:

- Nero
- The Turned Head, an adaptation of Theodore S. Fay's novel Norman Leslie
- The Buggs, a burlesque
