= Ann West Bignall =

American actress

Ann West Bignall (died 1805) was an American stage actress.

== Biography ==
Born in the late 1760s, she was the daughter of actors Thomas Wade West and Margaretta Sully West. She was married to actor John Bignall (d. 1794) and in 1795 to actor James West.

=== Career ===
She emigrated with her family to the United States in 1790 and was engaged with them in the Old American Company until her father founded the Virginia Company (also called Virginia Comedians and South Carolina Company), which toured the Southern States of Virginia and the Carolinas.

After this, she was active within the company of her parents until her death. The company virtually had a monopoly in Virginia and the Carolinas, and she was the leading lady and one of the star attractions.

In 1804, Aaron Burr called her "the best female actress in America". After her death, the Richmond Enquirer often compared other actresses to Bignall as a role model.
