= St. Cecilia Society =

The St. Cecilia Society of Charleston, South Carolina, named for the traditional patron saint of music, was formed in 1766 as a private subscription concert organization. Over the next fifty-four years, its annual concert series formed the most sophisticated musical phenomenon in North America.

Due to loss of the organization's administrative records during the American Civil War, much inaccurate information about the society has been published. Its important role in the formation of early American musical culture has largely been overlooked.

Although its musical patronage ended in 1820, the St. Cecilia Society continues to flourish today as one of South Carolina's oldest and most exclusive social institutions.

== Origin ==
Many writers have labeled Charleston's St. Cecilia Society the first musical society in the United States, but it would be more accurate to describe it as the earliest known private subscription concert organization in North America. Similar subscription concert organizations, such as the Academy of Ancient Music, abounded in mid-18th-century Britain, and similar subscription series also appeared in Boston, New York City, and Philadelphia in the mid-1760s. Unlike those northern examples that were founded as public commercial ventures run by professional musicians, however, Charleston's St. Cecilia Society was established as a private organization. It was incorporated and administered by gentlemen amateurs, who contracted with professional musicians to present an annual series of private concerts. This arrangement not only endowed the society with a more secure financial base, but also ensured its survival beyond the initial generation of founders.

Since the loss of the society's earliest records, its founding date has been the subject of a good deal of speculation and confusion. A wide range of dates, spanning from as early as 1732 to as late as 1784, has been published in various books and articles over the past century, but the year 1762 is most often cited in reference to the society's origin. Unfortunately, this widely accepted date is grounded on inaccurate information taken from secondary sources. The preponderance of historical evidence, of which there is a considerable amount, clearly places the founding of Charleston's St. Cecilia Society in the year 1766.

== Early membership ==
The full list of the early members of Charleston's St. Cecilia Society perished with the rest of its records during the Civil War. Recent efforts to reconstruct the early membership from archival sources have yielded more than two hundred names, which, while representing only a fraction of the membership, allow some general conclusions to be drawn. From the beginning, the St. Cecilia Society's membership included the most prosperous planters, politicians, lawyers, physicians, and merchants in the South Carolina Lowcountry.

As with other social organizations and political institutions formed in 18th-century South Carolina, the society's early membership consisted entirely of white Protestant men, the majority of whom were members of the Anglican or Episcopal Church. Following the example of the numerous subscription concert organizations in late 18th-century Britain, the membership of the St. Cecilia Society was (and still is) open only to men. Women have formed a significant part of the audience at the society's events since 1767, but they have never been considered as members of the organization.

== Concert series ==
Over the span of 54 years of concert activity, 1766 to 1820, the St. Cecilia Society presented 43 seasons of regular concerts. The eleven years of apparent inactivity were the result of the American Revolution (eight seasons, autumn 1775 - spring 1783), financial complications (two seasons, autumn 1788 – spring 1790), and the War of 1812 (one season, autumn 1814 - spring 1815).

While the date of the commencement and termination of each season varied from year to year, the concerts generally began in mid-autumn and continued fortnightly through early spring. The number of concerts each season also varied, but over the course of half a century they averaged at least eight or nine performances per season.

Elegant balls or dancing assemblies replaced the concerts after 1820, but dancing was not a new addition to the society's activities. Beginning with its inaugural season in 1766–67, each concert was followed by several hours of social dancing. Since 1820, however, dancing assemblies have been the focus of the society's annual events.

== Audience ==
A number of music historians have described the St. Cecilia Society's performances as among the earliest public concerts in the United States. This statement is misleading, however, as the society's concerts were never "public" events in the modern American sense of the word. From the beginning, the St. Cecilia concerts were open only to members of the society and their guests, including the ladies of the members' families and invited gentlemen.

The early success of its concerts prompted the society to enact measures to control access to its events. Many of its early rules articulated the eligibility requirements for male guests and expressly prohibited the admission of "boys."

== Performance venues ==
In its long history, the St. Cecilia Society has never owned or built its own performance space. During its concert era the society hired eight different venues in Charleston, ranging in size from approximately 1,000 to nearly 3,600 square feet (330 m^{2}). Four of these structures still survive: the Great Room in the Exchange Building, the Long Room of McCrady's Tavern, the South Carolina Society Hall, and the first South Carolina State House (now Charleston County Courthouse).

Between 1821 and 1861, the society held its events at St. Andrew's Hall. After the Civil War it briefly used the South Carolina Society Hall and the Deutsche Freundschafts Bund Hall (now the home of Charleston's Washington Light Infantry).

Since the early 1880s, its events have taken place at Hibernian Hall.

== Performers ==
The music at the St. Cecilia Society's concerts was performed by a combination of amateurs and hired professionals. Like the British subscription concert organizations it emulated, the core of the society's early orchestra was drawn from its membership, and seasoned professionals were hired as its treasury grew.

Professional musicians were usually drawn from the local population or recruited through private channels, but in 1771 the society advertised throughout the American colonies and in London to fill several positions, offering contracts for one to three years. On the eve of the American Revolution, the orchestra of the St. Cecilia Society included at least twenty musicians, including gentlemen amateurs and professionals from England, the Dutch Republic, France, Germany, Italy, and the West Indies.

Following several years of rebuilding its forces in the wake of the Revolution, the size of the society's orchestra was augmented in 1793 by the opening of the Charleston Theatre, with its seasonally resident orchestra, and the nearly simultaneous arrival of French musicians fleeing the Haitian Revolution. Over the next two decades, the society enjoyed a symbiotic relationship with the local theater musicians, many of whom traveled northward for the summer months and performed at other concert series.

Female amateurs and female professionals appeared occasionally at the St. Cecilia Society's concerts, as instrumental or vocal soloists. Professional singers, usually affiliated with the local theater, presented songs from popular English and French stage works. Young lady amateurs, generally performing on the harpsichord, piano, or harp, occasionally played solo works or appeared in small ensembles or as concerto soloists.

== Musical repertoire ==
Despite the long distance between Charleston and London, the repertoire of the St. Cecilia concerts (as the society's performances were known) generally kept pace with the musical fashions of contemporary Britain. The constant commercial trade between the two cities, augmented by Charleston's fervent desire to follow English fashions, encouraged the importation of musical works by the most "modern" and "fashionable" European composers, or at least the works of composers then favored in London. Among the composers whose works were heard in Charleston between 1766 and 1820 are Carl Friedrich Abel, Johann Christian Bach, Ludwig van Beethoven, George Frideric Handel, Joseph Haydn, Leopold Kozeluch, Wolfgang Amadeus Mozart, Josef Mysliveček, Ignaz Pleyel, and Johann Stamitz.

London musical fashions did not completely monopolize the concert repertoire heard in Charleston during this period. Thanks to the influx of French musicians in the 1790s in the wake of the French Revolution and the Haitian Revolution, the works of composers such as François Adrien Boieldieu, Nicolas-Marie Dalayrac, André Ernest Modeste Grétry, and Étienne Méhul were also heard in Charleston.

Although several of the musicians residing in Charleston during the late 18th and early 19th centuries are known to have composed some music, the St. Cecilia Society made no effort to encourage the creation of a local musical style. Since the society measured its musical success by its ability to replicate contemporary European practices, the cultivation of a "native" musical language would have seemed too provincial for an organization that strove to appear as cosmopolitan as possible.

In keeping with British practices of the day, each of the St. Cecilia Society's concerts included a mix of musical genres. Orchestral works opened and closed each of the "acts" or "parts" of the concert, while a varied succession of concertos, pieces for small instrumental ensembles, and vocal selections filled the rest of the bill.

== Cessation of concerts ==
The termination of the society's concert series in 1820 was motivated by several factors. By 1815, musical fashions in Charleston were changing and enthusiasm for the society's concerts, a conspicuous vestige of the Age of Enlightenment, was in decline. In 1817, the Charleston Theatre Company initiated a touring circuit which disrupted the society's long-standing practice of sharing musicians with the local theater.

On a number of occasions in the ensuing seasons, the St. Cecilia Society offered balls as last-minute substitutes for concerts when a sufficient number of musicians could not be procured. Finally, the Panic of 1819 unraveled the local economy and induced the organization to curtail its activities. After three increasingly meager seasons, the society held its last regular concert in the spring of 1820 and in subsequent years presented a greatly reduced number of balls.

== Historical significance ==
The St. Cecilia Society's importance as a musical institution is considerable, although this aspect of the society's heritage it is often overlooked in favor of its relatively more recent notability as an elite social organization. While the society's existence is not unknown to music historians, few details of its concert activity have heretofore been available, to facilitate comparisons with European or other early American musical phenomena. For more than a century, musicologists have been inclined to characterize 18th-century American concert life in general as a "feeble imitation" of European practices.

In contrast to this conclusion, however, Nicholas Butler's recent reconstruction of the St. Cecilia Society's concert era demonstrates the existence of a robust and long-term effort in Charleston to replicate Old World models. It portrays the society as the most significant example of concert patronage in the United States before the advent of the New York Philharmonic in 1842.

Memories of the society's musical heritage soon faded after its records were lost during the Civil War, and subsequent writers have focused on the society's social activities and the glamour of its annual debutante ball. At the end of the 19th century, many Charlestonians began to view the St. Cecilia Society as a valuable link to their city's "golden age" of prosperity in the preceding century.

On the other hand, to many observers the St. Cecilia Society stood as a symbol of Charleston's rigid insularity and its resistance to a broader democratic philosophy. Despite such friction, inclusion in the society's activities is still widely believed to represent the achievement of the ultimate insider status in Charleston.

== Historiography ==
The earliest-known published description of Charleston's St. Cecilia Society and its legacy of musical patronage is found in Charles Fraser's Reminiscences of Charleston (first published in 1854), which contains a brief but highly influential synopsis of the history of the society.

Although Fraser (1782–1860) was admitted as a society member in 1803, and his father, Alexander Fraser, had been among the founding members, his 1854 account of concert activities is vague and contains factual errors. Nevertheless, his description of the St. Cecilia Society's concert era has been cited and repeated by numerous authors as the definitive (and only) published first-person account of this early American musical phenomenon.

Oscar Sonneck's influential text, Early Concert-Life in America (1907), was the first scholarly publication to acknowledge the musical prominence of Charleston's St. Cecilia Society, but Sonneck lamented that their early history appeared to have been lost. 20th-century musicologists repeated Sonneck's assessment without adding further insight or additional detail.

Outside of musicological circles, Harriott Horry Ravenel's Charleston: The Place and the People (1906) was the first local history text to offer a glimpse into the St. Cecilia Society's past. Despite having attended the society's balls since the early 1850s, Mrs. Ravenel's assessment of the concert era is based entirely upon Charles Fraser's earlier synopsis.

In the course of the 20th century, scores of books and articles about Charleston and its cultural heritage have included mention of the St. Cecilia Society. With very little deviation, such works echo the words of Fraser, Sonneck, and/or Ravenel; they do not offer new factual information. Nicholas Butler's recently published monograph, Votaries of Apollo: the St. Cecilia Society and the Patronage of Concert Music in Charleston, South Carolina, 1766–1820 (2007), represents the first scholarly effort to reconstruct the details of the group's 54 years of concert activity. It is based upon extant archival materials from the late 18th and early 19th centuries.

== Current activity ==
Between the cessation of its concert patronage in 1820 and the onset of the Great Depression in the 1930s, the St. Cecilia Society continued its activities by presenting an annual series of three or four elegant balls. The economic downturn of the 1930s induced the society to limit its seasonal activities to a single ball, and this pattern has continued to the present day.

During its first century, the St. Cecilia Society's membership included the gentlemen of Charleston's socio-economic elite---a group that included representatives of a broad range of professions and backgrounds. As the city's population expanded and more men sought to be included in this prestigious organization, the society established new restrictions on membership in an effort to prevent its events from swelling to an unmanageable size. For more than a century now, the society has limited its membership to the male descendants of earlier members---a move that has effectively closed the organization to anyone without deep roots in Charleston.

The St. Cecilia Society continues to flourish in the 21st century, but 200 years of social change have sapped much of its original vitality. Due to its popular reputation as an "ancient," hyper-exclusive organization, the group frequently is portrayed in the media as an exaggerated romantic synecdoche for the historic "charm" of the city of Charleston. The modern St. Cecilia Society of Charleston generally eschews public notice, however, as it attempts to preserve its narrowly defined, time-honored cultural traditions.

== Contemporaneous Reference ==
The St. Cecilia Ball is described in Alexandra Ripley's novel, Scarlett, the sequel to Margaret Mitchell's Gone With The Wind.
