= James H. Caldwell =

American actor (1793–1863)

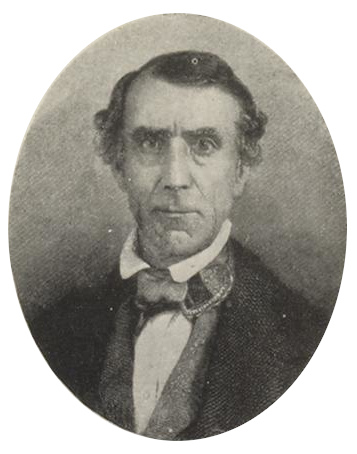
- Born: May 10, 1793; Manchester, England
- Died: September 11, 1863 (aged 70); New York City, US
- Spouses: Maria Carter Hall Wormeley (m. 1819, divorced) Josephine Rowe (m. 1851; died 1857)
- Partners: Jane Placide (c. 1823–1835); Margaret Abrams (c. 1837–1848)
- Children: At least 7, including William Shakespeare Caldwell

James Henry Caldwell (May 10, 1793 – September 11, 1863), was an English-born American actor, theatre manager and entrepreneur. Known as New Orleans "Father of Light", he owned the New Orleans Gas Light Company, making New Orleans the fourth city in the United States to have gas lighting. Also a theater entrepreneur, he built the first English speaking theater in New Orleans and many theaters across the South.

== Early life ==
Caldwell was born in Manchester, England, on May 10, 1793. He was the son of Edward Henry Caldwell of Manchester.

== Career ==
Caldwell moved to the United States in 1814, settling in Fredericksburg, Virginia. He introduced English language theatre in New Orleans, where he managed the St. Philip Street Theatre from 1820 to 1822, the Camp Street Theatre from 1822 to 1835, and the St. Charles Theatre from 1835 to 1842.

After Charleston, South Carolina, in 1817, he moved to Virginia, setting up a theatrical circuit in many areas including Richmond and Petersburg. He later moved to New Orleans in 1820, where he leased St. Philip Street Theatre and built his own acting company.

As well as managing the Camp Street Theatre for 11 years, Caldwell took his company to various towns including Natchez, Nashville, and Huntsville. In 1829, Sol Smith, a famous actor and manager in the Southwest at the time, joined his company. There were also many other famous actors that Caldwell engaged with; Edwin Forrest was one of them who performed at the Camp Street Theatre in 1829.

Soon after, he announced his retirement, leasing the Camp Street Theatre to Richard Russell and James Simon Rowe, but never fully retired due to his love for the theatre and his career. He instead opened St. Charles Theatre in 1835 and the Royal Street Theatre in 1841. However, Caldwell fully retired when the St. Charles Theatre burned down in 1842.

=== Business career ===
Caldwell introduced gas lighting to New Orleans. He organized the New Orleans Gas Light Company, with a capital of $300,000. Failing to get any of the citizens to join him in this pioneer, but promising, enterprise, he determined to light the city at his own expense, which remarkable feat he accomplished in September 1833.

But it wasn't until he left the stage and moved from New Orleans to Louisville that he amassed his immense wealth. He established gas companies in New Orleans and other cities, including Cincinnati, St. Louis and Mobile, and also prospered from real estate ventures in Louisville.

== Personal life ==
In 1819, he married Maria Carter (née Hall) Wormeley, the widow of Warner Wormeley of Rose Gill. She was the daughter of Dr. Elisha Hall (family physician to Mary Washington) and Caroliana (née Carter) Hall (a daughter of Charles Carter, the longtime member of the Virginia House of Burgesses). From her first marriage, she was the mother of Dr. Carter Warner Wormeley. Together, they were the parents of:

- William Shakespeare Caldwell (1821–1874), who married Mary Eliza Breckinridge, a daughter of U.S. Representative James D. Breckinridge, in 1853.
- Sophia Caldwell (1824–1872), who married Thomas J. Deane of New York in 1862.

Caldwell also had a long-term extramarital relationship with a Margaret Abrams per Orleans Parish court records. Together, they were the parents of:

- James Henry Caldwell Jr. (1838–1870), a "gentleman of large means and very charitable" who died in Mobile, Alabama in 1870.
- Alice Caldwell (1839-1846).
- Unnamed Infant Caldwell (1841-1842).
- Edward Holland Caldwell (1844–1872), who married Caroline Amelia Shields, a daughter of Edward Ferguson Shields, in 1864. After his death in 1872, she married Santos Santiago Rubira.

Caldwell married the young actress Josephine Rowe, whose mother, Louisa, he had worked with for decades, in 1851 after Margaret's death. This also means Caldwell and his first wife must have been divorced by this time. Together, they were the parents of:

- Harry Stroud Caldwell (1855-1860)

Through his son William, he was the grandfather of American philanthropist Mary Gwendolin des Monstiers-Mérinville and the great-grandfather of German-born American bridge champion Baron Waldemar von Zedtwitz.
