= Wingfield Bullock =

American politician

Member of the U.S. House of Representatives from Kentucky's 8th district
- In office March 4, 1821 – October 13, 1821
- Preceded by: Richard C. Anderson Jr.
- Succeeded by: James D. Breckinridge

Member of the Kentucky Senate
- In office 1812–1814

Personal details
- Born: 1766 Spotsylvania, Colony of Virginia, British America
- Died: October 13, 1821 (aged 54–55) Shelbyville, Kentucky, U.S.
- Party: Democratic-Republican
- Profession: Politician

Wingfield Bullock (1766 – October 13, 1821) was a U.S. representative from Kentucky.

Born in 1766 in Spotsylvania, Virginia, Bullock studied law. He moved to Kentucky. He served as member of the Kentucky Senate from Shelby County from 1812 to 1814.

Bullock was elected as a Democratic-Republican to the Seventeenth Congress (March 4, 1821 – October 13, 1821). He died on October 13, 1821, in Shelbyville, Kentucky. He was interred in an old burying ground near Shelbyville.

== See also ==
- List of members of the United States Congress who died in office (1790–1899)

U.S. House of Representatives
Preceded by Richard C. Anderson, Jr.	Member of the U.S. House of Representatives from Kentucky's 8th congressional district 1821	Succeeded by James D. Breckinridge
