= Jane Placide =

American actress (1800's -1835)

Jane Placide (1803/1804 – May 16, 1835) was an American actress.

== Life ==
Jane Placide was a daughter of Alexander Placide, manager of the Charleston Theatre in Charleston, and actress/opera singer Charlotte Wrighten Placide, who managed the same theatre after the death of her spouse until 1813, when the family lost the theatre.

Jane had three siblings; Caroline, Henry and Thomas. All four children became well-known actors, however, it's unclear what stage names they later used.

=== Career ===
Jane Placide and her siblings were schooled into the acting profession from an early age in their parents theater company, who performed both in the Charleston Theatre as well as toured around Virginia and the Carolina states. She made her formal debut as an actor as Volante in 'The Honey Moon' in the Norfolk, Virginia company of impresario Charles Gilfert in 1820.

Placide was engaged by James H. Caldwell in his American Company at the American Theatre on Orleans Street in New Orleans, where she made her debut in 1823. Caldwell's American Company was the first permanent English language theatre in New Orleans, and Jane Placide was to become the most celebrated actress in New Orleans. She was engaged at the Camp Street Theatre (also called 'American Theatre') from 1824, when Caldwell founded that theatre. During her period of employment, the Camp Street Theatre was called the finest theatre in the South, and Placide was consequently famed in the entire Antebellum South.

She mainly starred in Shakespearean roles, such as Ophelia, Desdemona, and Juliet, but she also acted in comedies, such as Mrs Candour in "The School for Scandal", and melod drama, such as Mrs Haller in "The Stranger" by Benjamin Thompson. One of her most celebrated parts was when she appeared at James H. Caldwell's American Theatre in James H. Kennicott's romantic tragedy Irma; or The Prediction in 1830. She acted with many of the most famed actors on the American stage, such as Thomas Abthorpe Cooper, Junius Brutus Booth and Edwin Forrest. In 1834, she accompanied James H. Caldwell to London, where she made her debut at the Covent Garden Theatre.

Placide never married, but had a long term relationship with Caldwell. Edwin Forrest was reportedly also in love with Placide, and supposedly challenged Caldwell to a duel, which never happened.

=== Death ===
Placide died at age 31. She was buried at the Girod Cemetery originally. The cemetery was eventually disbanded and her remains were reburied at the Hope Mausoleum.
