= Charleston Theatre =

Theatre in South Carolina, US (1794–1833)

- Interactive map of Charleston Theatre
- Address: Charleston, South Carolina; United States
- Coordinates: 32°46′32.89″N 79°56′11.21″W

Construction
- Opened: 1794
- Demolished: 1833

Charleston Theatre, also called Broad Street Theatre, was a theatre in Charleston, South Carolina, between 1794 and 1833. It was the first permanent theatre in Charleston, the first with a permanent staff, and the only theater for much of its duration. It was succeeded by the New Charleston Theatre (1837–1861).

== History ==
Since the first temporary theatre Dock Street Theatre in 1736, several playhouses had been constructed in Charleston to house the Old American Company during their visits in the city, the last of whom, Church Street Theatre, built in 1773 to replace the New Theatre of 1754, burnt down in 1782. Charleston was the center of a planter aristocracy which spent half the year in the city living a society life in which theater was considered a suitable part, and a new theater house was therefore regarded necessary after the repeal of the Vagrancy Act of 1787, which had the effect of banning the theater.

Charleston Theatre initially housed the Company of Thomas Wade West, which was called Charleston Company or South Carolina Company when performing there, and Virginia Company when performing in Virginia. Until 1817, the St. Cecilia Society performed their concerts in the building as well as participated in the theatre orchestra.

In 1794, John Sollée opened the Charleston French Theatre or Théâtre Francais, which became a powerful rival, able to offer artists from Saint Domingue, such as Alexander Placide and Suzanne Douvillier. In 1796, Thomas Wade West sold the Charleston Theatre to John Sollée, uniting the two theatres. Under Placide, the theater was the base of the Charleston Company, which performed in Savannah in Georgia (from 1801) and Richmond, Virginia (from 1804) until 1812. It was closed during the war of 1812 but reopened in 1815.

In 1817, the theater was the center of the Charleston Theatre riot, in which the audience sided with the popular star actor James H. Caldwell during his conflict with the management.

The theatre deteriorated during the 1820s and went bankrupt in 1833.

Managers

- 1793-1796: Thomas Wade West
- 1796-1799: John Sollée
- 1799-1812: Alexander Placide
- 1812-1813: Charlotte Wrighten Placide
- 1813-1815: The theater is closed.
- 1815-1817: Joseph George Holman
- 1817-1822: Charles Gilfert
- 1822-1825: Amelia Holman Gilfert
