= Mary Gwendolin Caldwell, Marquise des Monstiers-Mérinville =

American philanthropist and socialite (1863–1909)

Mary Gwendolin Caldwell
- Marquise des Monstiers-Mérinville
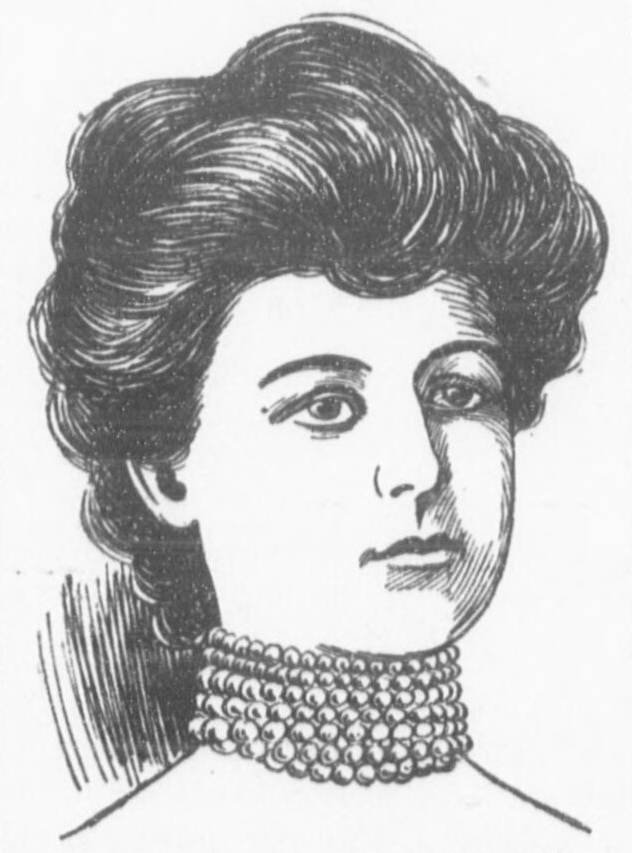
- Likeness printed in the Mexico Missouri Message in 1904.
- Born: Mary Gwendolin Byrd Caldwell; October 21, 1863; Louisville, Kentucky, U.S.
- Died: August 5, 1909 (aged 45); New York Harbor, New York, U.S.
- Buried: Cave Hill Cemetery
- Spouse: François Jean Louis, Marquis des Monstiers-Mérinville (m. 1896)
- Father: William S. Caldwell

Mary Gwendolin (Note: In some sources the name is spelled "Guendaline".) Byrd, Marquise des Monstiers-Mérinville (née Caldwell; 1863–1909) was an American philanthropist and socialite. She funded the foundation of the Catholic University at Washington, D.C. in the 1880s, but had renounced the Roman Catholic faith by 1904.

== Family ==
The Marquise des Monstiers-Mérinville and her sister, the Baroness von Zedtwitz, were the daughters of William S. Caldwell, a Kentucky gas baron and one of Louisville's first millionaires by the late 1850s, and his wife Mary Eliza (d. 1867), who was a Breckinridge of Kentucky. Shortly before his death, in 1874, William Caldwell became a convert to Roman Catholicism and left his children to the care of Roman Catholics followers in New York, whom his wife had met in church circles. The younger sister Mary Elizabeth married, in June 1890, a German nobleman, the Baron von Zedtwitz, a Lutheran, and since then left the Roman Catholic communion. The baron and his wife Mary Elizabeth had one son, Waldemar Konrad von Zedtwitz, a future bridge champion.

== Debutante ==
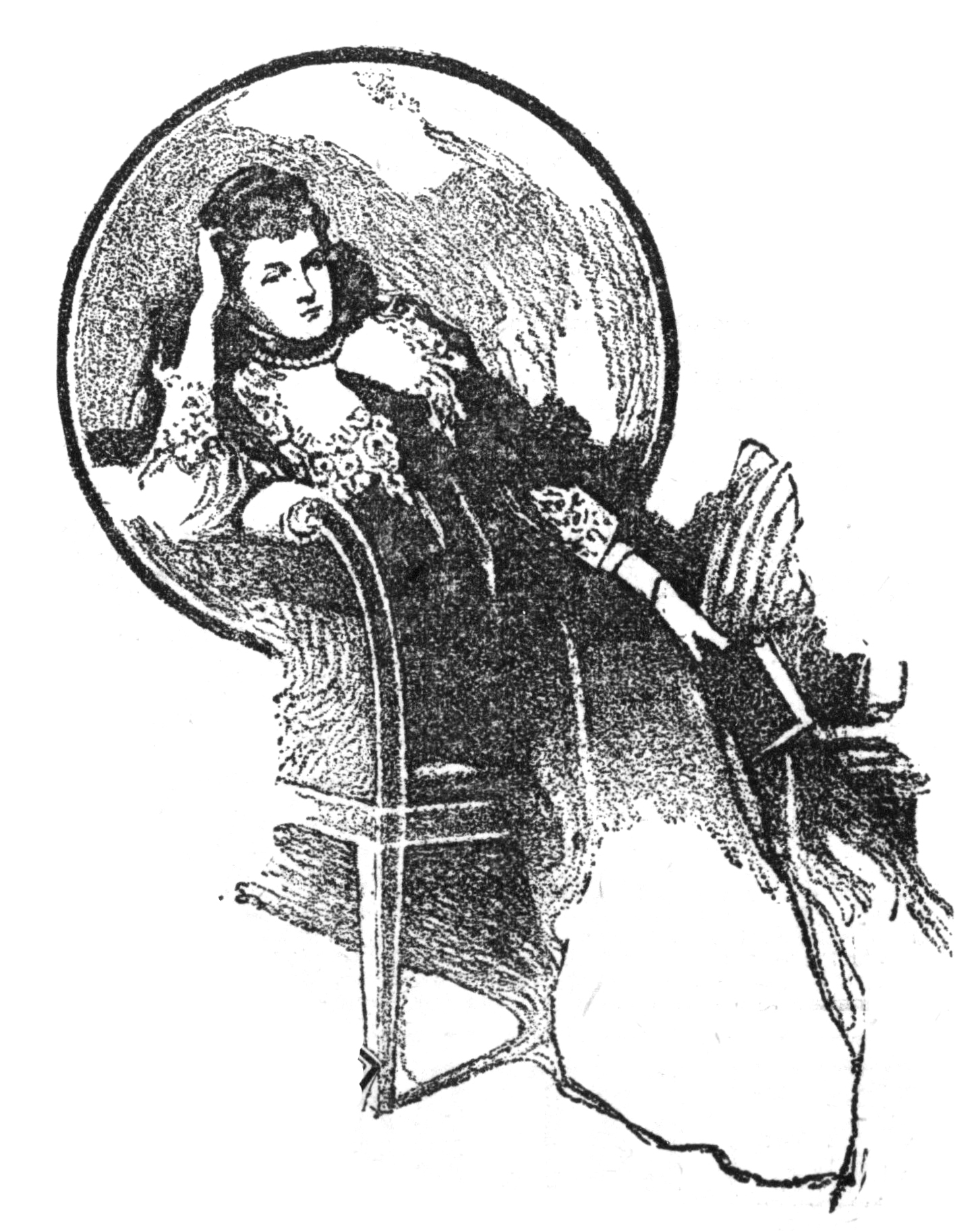
Likeness printed in The Savannah Morning News in 1904.

Mary Gwendolin Caldwell was accounted a Kentucky beauty and heiress, her mother being one of the famous Breckinridge family of that state. When a little girl she inherited from her father a fortune of $2,000,000, and at her mother's death inherited $500,000 more.

After graduating from a convent she and her sister went abroad to travel with their aunt. On their return to America, Gwendolin went to Louisville, Kentucky, rented an entire floor of the Galt House, and prepared to entertain in a manner new to the people of that place. Her first public appearance was at the opening night of Mary Anderson. After the play she entertained half of Louisville in her apartments. The newspapers the next morning printed columns of "not too friendly" comment on the appearance of the heiress and especially of her imported gown. It was low cut and she objected to the unflattering manner In which It was described. She returned to New York the next day.

== Catholic University ==
Soon after reaching her majority, Caldwell, through her guardian, Bishop Spalding, of Peoria, announced to the Catholic hierarchy her intention of endowing the Catholic University of America, and a council was held to consider her offer.

Such a project long had been considered, but sufficient funds had never been provided. Caldwell donated the eighty-eight acres on the edge of Washington, D.C., erected three of the largest buildings, including Caldwell Hall, which was the largest of the original group of buildings, and provided for the maintenance of the university for three years. Her sister, the Baroness von Zedtwitz, gave Caldwell Chapel to the university.

For this service Pope Leo XIII bestowed upon Gwendolin Caldwell a diamond-studded medal, which he had struck especially for her, and also conferred the decoration of the Order of the Rose, which distinction no other woman ever had held.

== Personal life ==
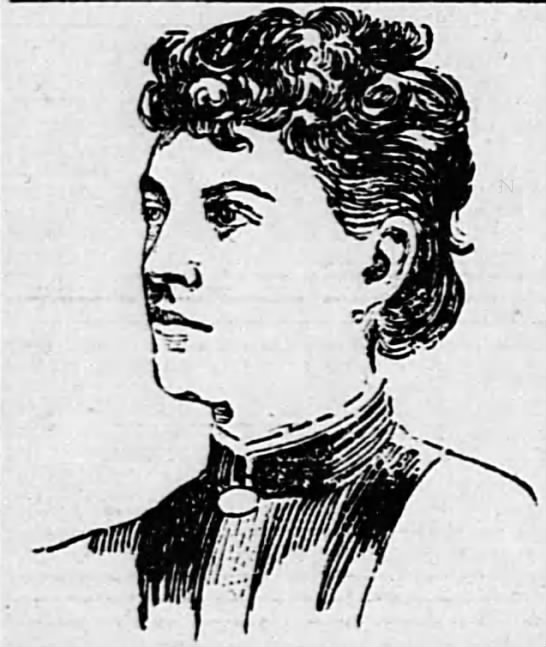
Likeness printed, with news of her recent marriage, in The Kansas City Journal in 1896.

The young heiress went to Italy in 1887, and there met Joachim, 4th Prince Murat, who was thirty-three years her senior, and deeply in debt. He was the grandson of Joachim-Napoleon, King of Naples, and of Caroline, sister of Napoleon I.

After their engagement was announced preparations for a regal wedding were made, a trousseau said to be "fit for a queen" secured, and the day for the ceremony set. The day before the marriage the prince and his legal representative and Caldwell and her attorneys met to arrange the antenuptial contract. The Prince insisted upon the control of the fortune. Caldwell refused this. Then he offered to take halt of it. This the American girl refused, saying that she had intended settling $26,000 a year upon her husband. The Prince wanted more. Caldwell at once broke the engagement and returned to America.

Caldwell, in 1896, announced her engagement to the Marquis de Monstiers-Mérinville. It was said to be a love match. She was married on October 19 of that year, the ceremony being performed by Bishop Spalding in Paris.

== Later life ==
After her marriage the Marquise went to Paris to live and her entertainments were notable there. She spent much of her time in charitable labors. Her health began to fail in 1902. Since then she was said to have led the life of a recluse.

In 1904 she repudiated her former creed and left the Roman Catholic Church. Prominent members of the Roman Catholic clergy in Washington expressed their surprise at the announcement that the Marquise des Monstiers had renounced the Catholic faith. In fact, they were loath to believe she had formed such a determination.

Bishop Spalding of Peoria, when asked if he could assign any reason for the Marquise des Monstiers' action, he answered that he could not; that he knew her only as a good Roman Catholic, and until the announcement was made had given no thought otherwise. "It is all a mystery to me," he said.

One official of the Roman Catholic Church attributed as a possible cause, taking the story to be correct, the notoriety which the university gained by the failure of Thomas E. Waggaman, its treasurer, by which the university suffered considerable financial loss.

== Scandal ==
Bishop Spalding was later accused of having an affair with both Caldwell sisters, though the allegation was questionable. Mary Gwendolin told her sister in 1901 that she had been sexually involved with Spalding for twenty years, beginning when she was nineteen. "[T]here is general consensus that the sisters' stories about Spalding bore little relation to the facts, that their tragic marriages and psychic illnesses, plus Spalding's unwillingness to arrange an annulment for Mary Elizabeth, contributed to their turning against the Church."

== Death ==
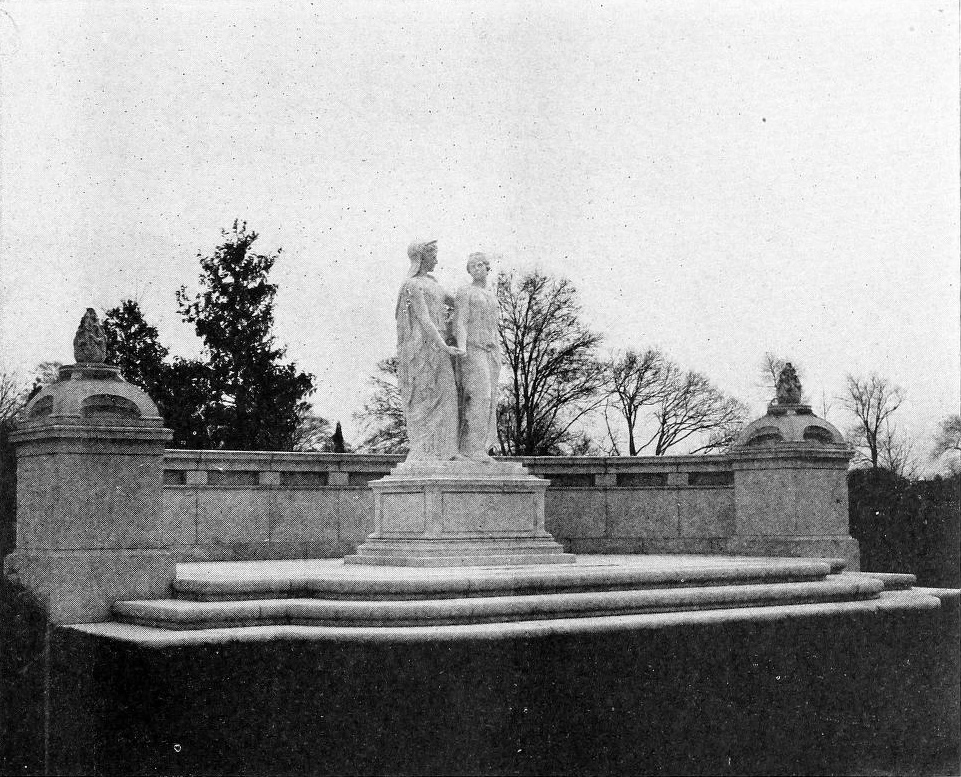
Caldwell sisters monument, Cave Hill Cemetery, in 1913.

In 1905 the Marquise and the Marquis separated, but she agreed to pay him an annual stipend of $8,000 in order to avoid a divorce and retain her noble title. Four years later, the Marquise died aboard an ocean liner waiting to dock at New York Harbor. Bright's disease was given as the immediate cause of death. She was buried in Cave Hill Cemetery in Louisville, Kentucky.

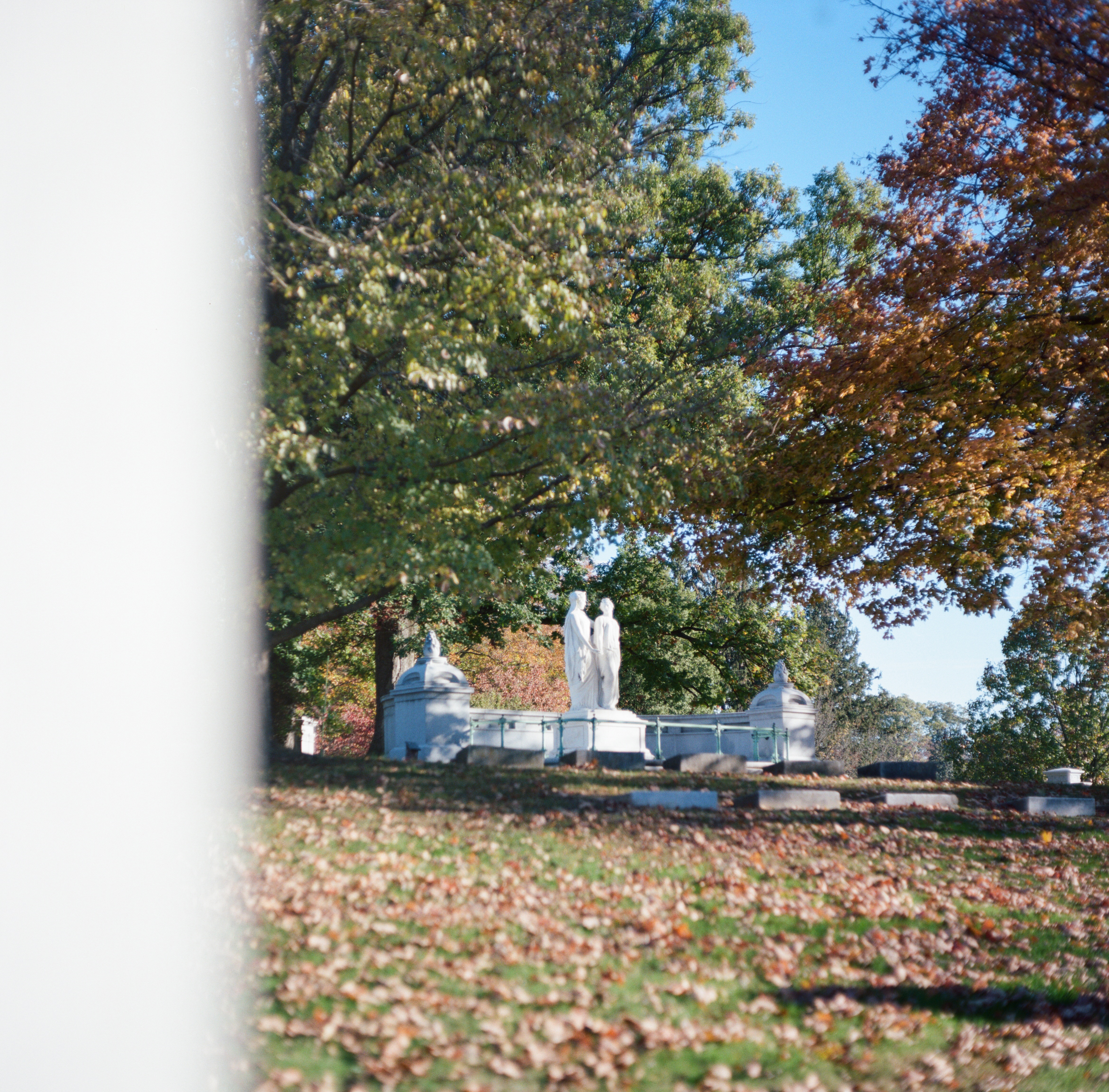
Grave of the Caldwell sisters in Louisville Kentucky.

== Honors ==
- : Golden Rose (1887)

== See also ==
- List of American heiresses
