= Saint Placidus =

Saint Placidus may refer to:

- Placidus (abbot), follower of Benedict of Nursia
- Placidus (martyr) (died 237), 4th-century Sicilian martyr
