= Woodville, Kentucky =

Unincorporated community in Kentucky, United States

Woodville
- Unincorporated community
- Location within the state of Kentucky Woodville (the United States)
- Coordinates: 37°5′48″N 88°52′24″W
- Country: United States
- State: Kentucky
- County: Ballard
- Elevation: 446 ft (136 m)
- Time zone: UTC-6 (Central (CST))
  - Summer (DST): UTC-5 (CST)
- GNIS feature ID: 507127

Woodville is an unincorporated community located in Ballard County, Kentucky, United States.
