= Placide Nicod =

Swiss orthopedic surgeon

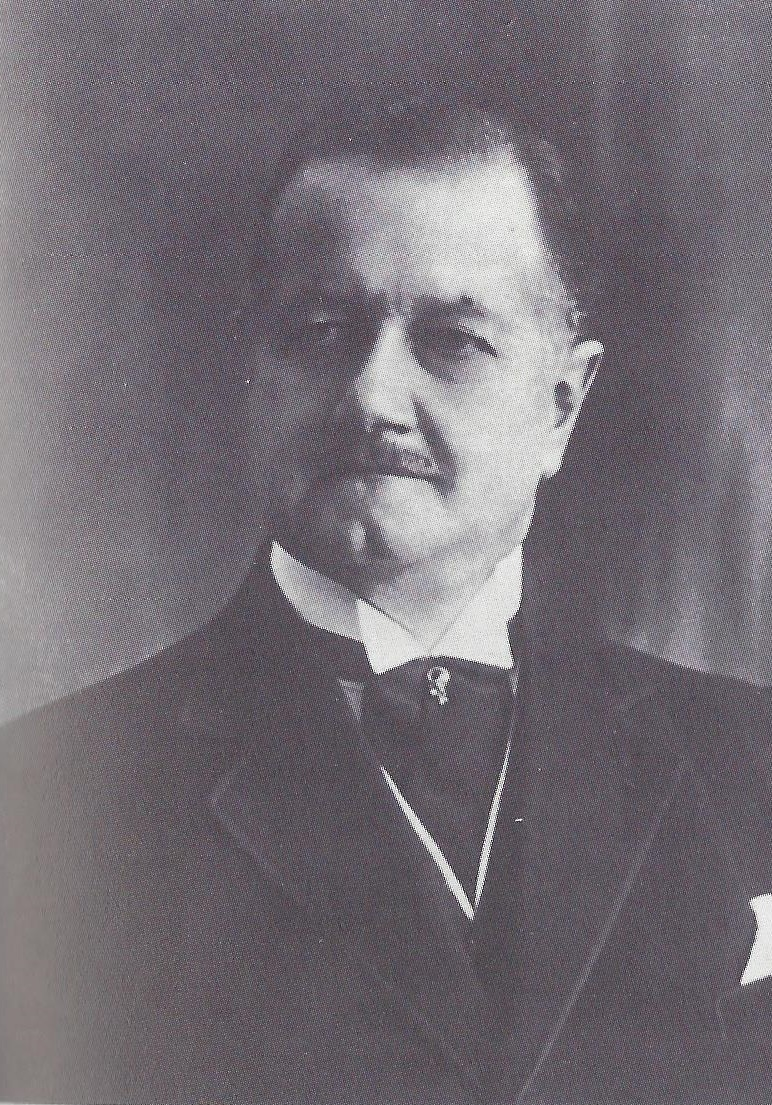
Placide Nicod

Placide Nicod (29 January 1876, in Bottens – 1 August 1953, in Évian-les-Bains) was a Swiss orthopedic surgeon. He was considered to be the top French-speaking Swiss orthopedist of his time.

He studied medicine at the University of Geneva, and afterwards, was an assistant to surgeon César Roux in Lausanne. From 1903 he worked as an assistant at the orthopedic hospital in Lausanne, where from 1905 to 1948 he served as chief physician and director.

In 1912 he opened a private clinic for orthopedic physical therapy in Lausanne, and during the following year, obtained his habilitation for orthopedics. Later on in his career, he was an associate professor of orthopedics (1931–47) and physiotherapy (1935–47) at the University of Lausanne. In 1942–44 he served as dean to the faculty of medicine.

His medical papers were published in the journals Revue suisse de médecine and Revue médicale de la Suisse romande.

== Selected works ==
- Le pronostic du pied bot congénital, 1908 – Prognostics for congenital club foot.
- Le "Genu valgum", 1912 – Genu valgum.
- Transplantations tendineuses, 1912 – Tendon transplants.
- Séquelles de poliomyélite, 1929 – Aftereffects of poliomyelitis.
- Traitement de la luxation de la hanche : leçon inaugurale, 1932 – Treatment for dislocation of hip.
- L'arthrite déformante de la hanche, 1942 – Deforming arthritis of the hip.
- Un cas intéressant de maladie de Little, 1943 – An interesting case of Little's disease.
