= Theatre Royal, Southampton =

Former theatre in Hampshire, England (1803–1884)

Coordinates: 50°53′54″N 1°24′20″W

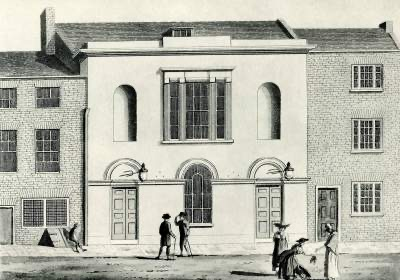
- Interactive map of Theatre Royal, Southampton
- Address: French Street; Southampton, Hampshire; England

Construction
- Opened: 12 September 1803
- Expanded: 2 September 1880
- Closed: 19 November 1884

The Theatre Royal, Southampton was a theatre in Southampton, Hampshire, England. It opened in 1803 and was located near the Medieval Merchant's House on French Street. Jane Austen and her family visited the theatre in 1807. The building was later renovated and expanded, and reopened as New Theatre Royal in 1880. It was destroyed by a fire in 1884.

== History ==
=== Early years ===
In 1766, a disused silk mill on French Street was converted into a theatre, which came under the management team of Thomas Collins and James Davies in the 1770s. Collins, an actor who also ran theatres in Chichester and Salisbury, subsequently acquired the site of the old St John's Hospital on French Street in 1798, a year after Davies' death. He built a new theatre, designed by an architect named Mr Slater, which finally opened five years later on 12 September 1803. Billed as the "Southampton New Theatre, Built on the exact Model of the Theatre-Royal Drury-Lane", the opening was well attended and well received. The Hampshire Chronicle applauded "the liberal and spirited manner" in which the building had been decorated, adding that "a more elegant, convenient, and brilliant Theatre is not to be met out of London." After Collins's death in 1807, the theatre was run by his son Stephen and son-in-law Henry Kelly.

=== Jane Austen connection ===
In early 1807, Jane Austen and her family moved to Castle Square, not far from the theatre. On 14 September of that year, they went to the theatre to see John Bannister in The Way to Keep Him by Arthur Murphy. In Jane Austen and the Theatre, historian Penny Gay writes that the theatre on French Street in Southampton was "smaller and less prestigious than Bath's Orchard Street Theatre", and mainly featured performances by provincial companies. Charles Kemble and Maria Theresa Kemble played at the theatre in August 1808.

=== Business operations ===
Until the 1860s, the Theatre Royal on French Street changed management frequently. According to A History of Southampton, the house managed to attract crowds intermittently. One of the most well attended productions featured Charles Kean, the son of actor Edmund Kean, performing in Shakespearean plays for four nights during Race Week. Former actress Harriet Mellon, the Duchess of St Albans, also drew crowds when she was in the audience. More often, ticket sales were "'middling' to 'thin'", as the theatre struggled to compete with other forms of entertainment, such as travelling circuses, which were popular with groundlings. For four seasons from 1842 to 1845, a lessee named Abington, a Shakespearean player himself, worked diligently to "raise the tone" of the Theatre Royal, but did not renew his lease after operating the theatre at a loss.

In the eight years thereafter, the Theatre Royal had no fewer than five different lessees. The fifth lessee, Holmes, tried to address major complaints about the theatre, which had become notorious for disorderly behaviour, such as objects being thrown into the pit from above during performances. From 1850, the Theatre Royal belonged to Charles Deacon, the Southampton town clerk. Its most commercially successful season in years was from 1853 to 1854, when shows ran through 2 May. In the late 1850s, the theatre finally started to receive more positive reviews in the local press on a regular basis. Starting in the early 1860s, the Theatre Royal came under more stable management as J. W. "Joey" Gordon, who was also the proprietor of the Rainbow music hall next door, took over as the lessee.

=== Reopening as the New Theatre Royal ===
On 2 September 1880, Gordon re-opened the theatre as the New Theatre Royal, after a major renovation and expansion, in which the old building was adjoined with the neighbouring hall and modern "comforts" were added. The main entrance was still in the same location, but the old dress circle was converted into a "ladies' cloak and crush room". The new theatre could hold up to 150 moveable seats with spring backs in front of the stage; the stage itself was also larger than in the old building. Behind the orchestra stalls, in the centre of the hall, were the pit stalls, which could seat about 100. Up above, there were two tiers of private boxes. One gallery was dedicated to upper boxes, while the second was a balcony which could be accessed through staircases on either side of the new building from the street.

=== Fire ===
On 19 November 1884, the Theatre Royal burned down in a large fire, which also destroyed the adjoining building, by then known as the Gaiety Theatre. The Hampshire Advertiser wrote:

The final and grandest "transformation" scene has been witnessed, the "unsubstantial pageant" has faded, and "not a wrack" is left of the plain, unpretending edifice which had for so long been known as the "Theatre Royal, Southampton."

== Heritage trail ==
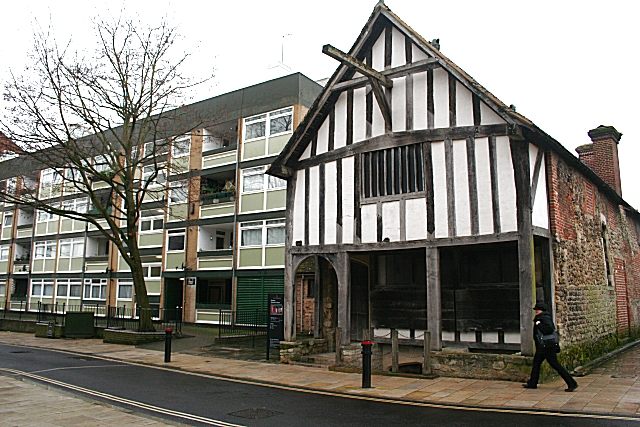
The site of the Theatre Royal is now occupied by modern flats (left), next to the Medieval Merchant's House (right).

The old Theatre Royal is now part of the Jane Austen Heritage Trail in Southampton. In 2013, The Washington Post commented that the site of the old Theatre Royal had "morphed into a hideous high-rise".
