= St. Andrew's Hall, Charleston =

Coordinates: 32.7764°N 79.9338°W

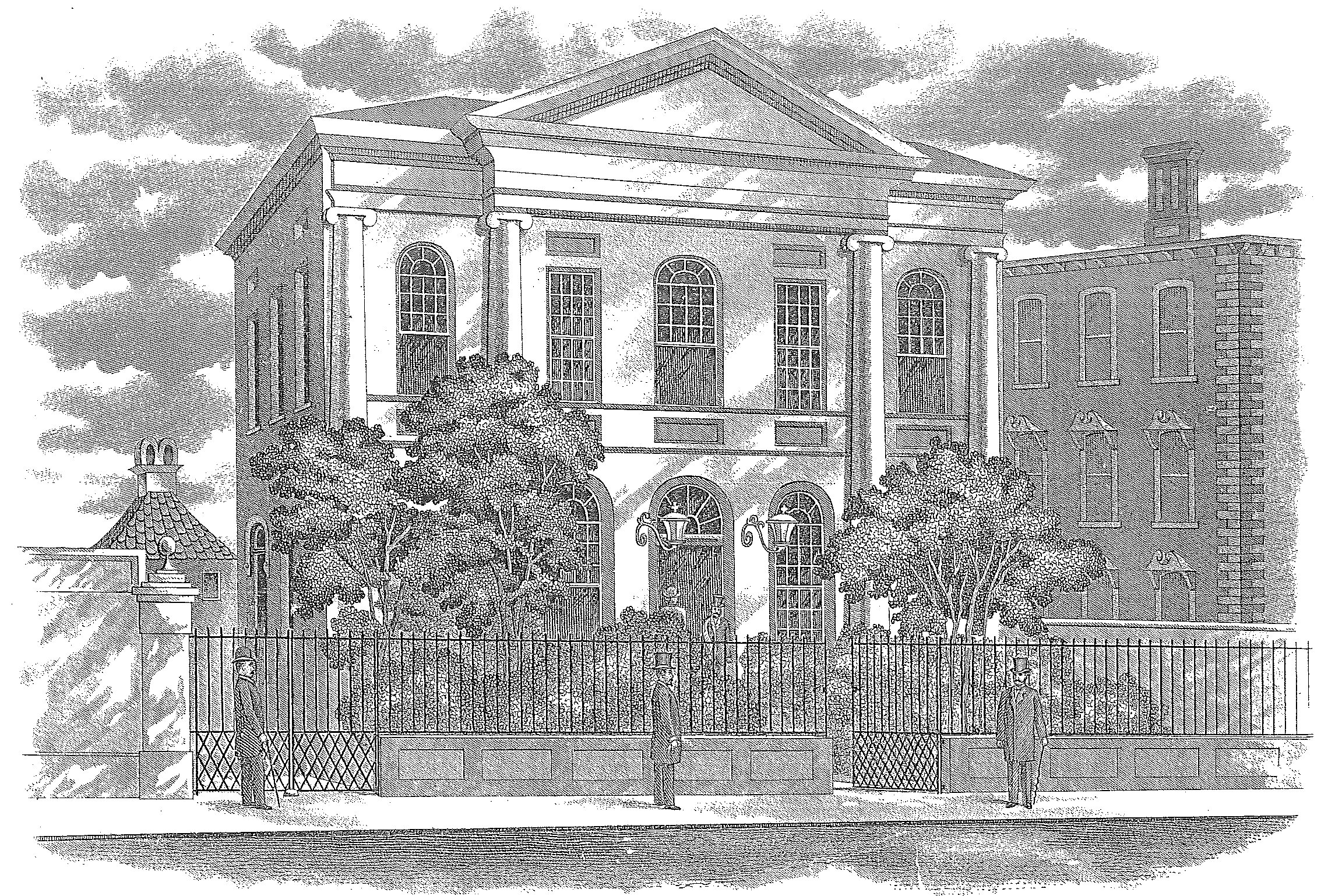
The hall in its heyday

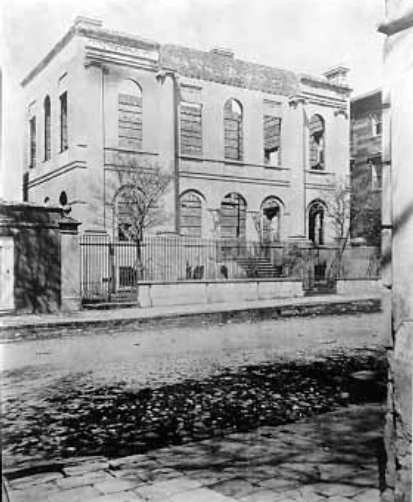
Burnt out shell of St. Andrew's Hall

St. Andrew's Hall was a public building in Charleston, South Carolina, on Broad Street. The hall served as headquarters for the St. Andrew's Society of Charleston, South Carolina. It was also an important part of the social life of upper-class Charlestonians. It was used for balls, banquets, concerts, and meetings of organizations like the South Carolina Jockey Club and the St. Cecilia Society. The hall could also be used for lodging, and both President James Monroe and General Marquis de Lafayette stayed there.

On December 19, 1860, delegates from South Carolina met at St. Andrew's Hall to discuss possible secession from the United States. The following day, they met in Institute Hall on Meeting Street, which became known as Secession Hall and voted 169 to 0 to secede. South Carolina delegates later ratified the Confederate Constitution there on April 3, 1861. South Carolina was the first state to secede from the Union.

The St. Andrew's Hall as well as Secession Hall were both destroyed during a Charleston fire on December 11, 1861

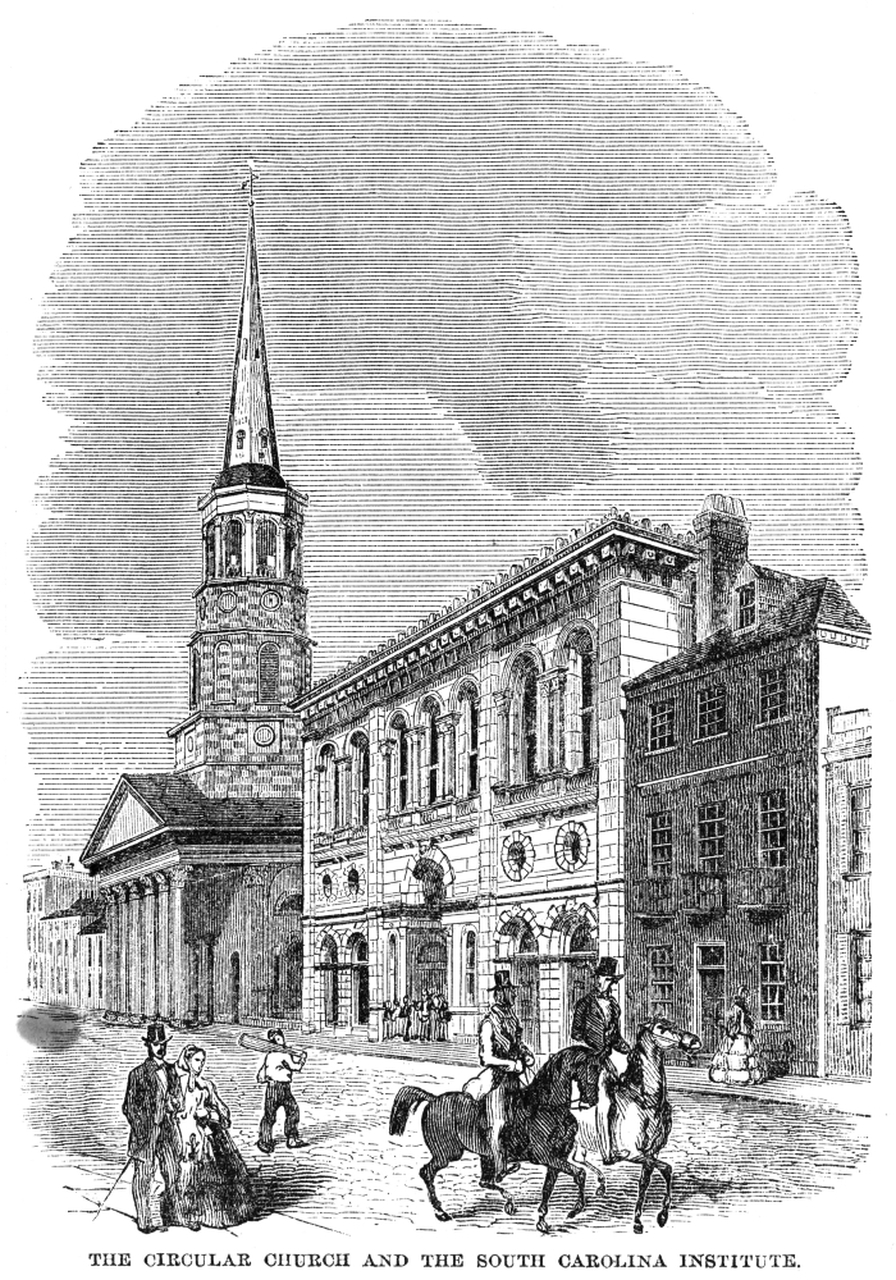
The Circular Church and the South Carolina Institute (Secession Hall)
