= Noah Ludlow =

American actor and theatre manager

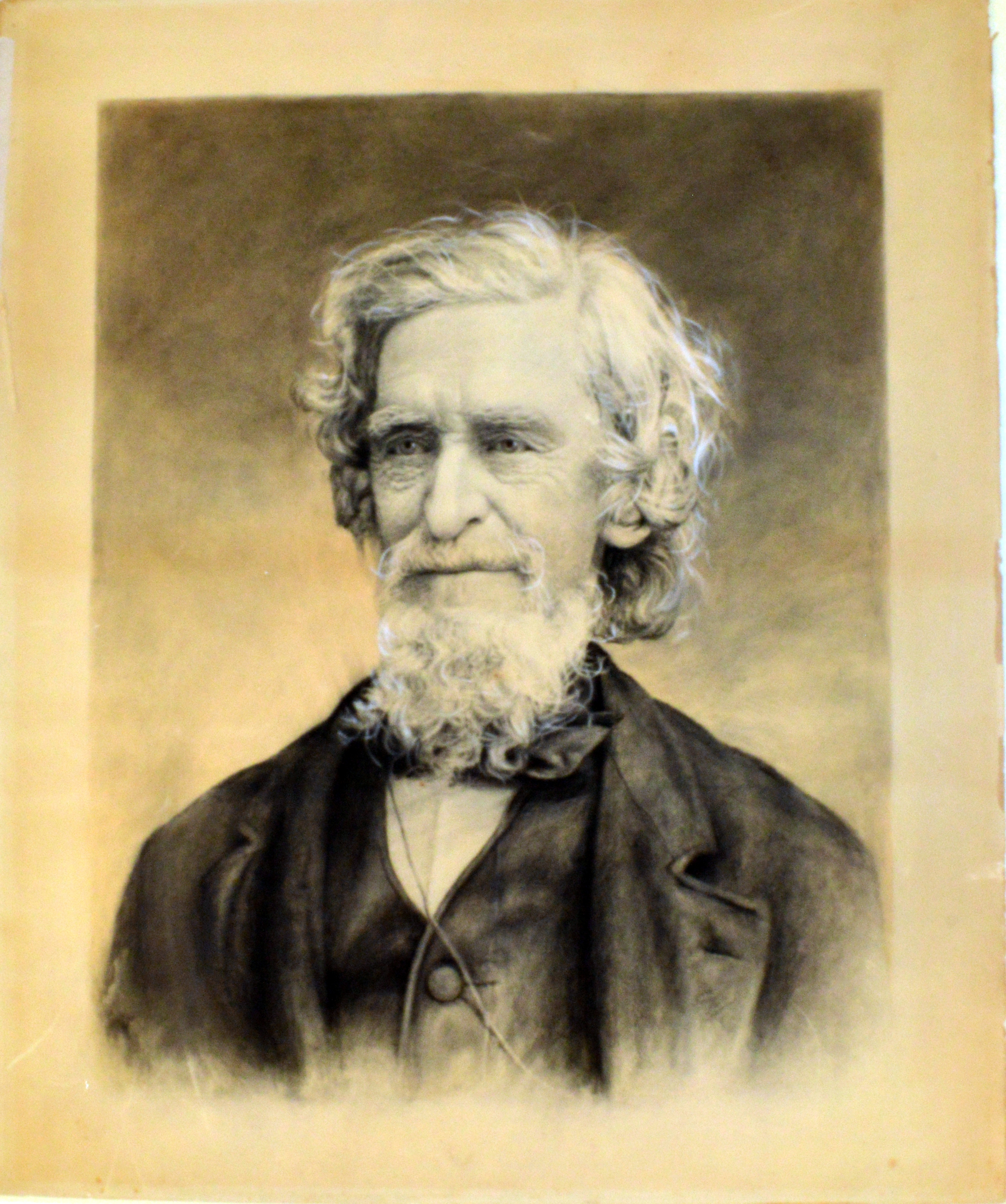
- Born: July 3, 1795; New York City, New York
- Died: January 9, 1886 (aged 90); St. Louis, Missouri
- Occupations: Theater Manager and Actor
- Spouse: Mary Maury Squires

Noah Miller Ludlow (July 3, 1795– January 9,1886), was an American actor and theatre manager. He was an early pioneer of theater in the South, performing in Alabama when it was still a territory. Ludlow and his partner Sol Smith were the leader of a theatre company which toured Louisiana (where he introduced English language theatre), Alabama, and Mississippi. Ludlow's greatest impact what in Mobile, where he helped establish four theaters and managed the city's Royal Street Theater.

In New Orleans, Ludlow made his career by performing "The Hunters of Kentucky", a song written at the end of the War of 1812 to celebrate the Battle of New Orleans.

In his eighties, Ludlow and his daughter wrote a history of his life in the Old Southwestern theater, titled Dramatic Life as I found it. His book was written partially in response to claims made by his ex-partner, Sol Smith, in his own writings after the two had a personal falling out in 1853.
