= Alexander Placide =

American actor

Alexander Placide (1750–1812), was an American (originally French) actor and theatre manager. He debuted in France in 1770 and was active in Saint-Domingue until the Haitian Revolution, after which he emigrated to the United States in 1791.

He managed the Charleston Theatre from 1796 and was the leader of the Charleston Company, which also toured Georgia and Virginia and is considered to have introduced a permanent theatre in these states. The Richmond Theatre fire of 1811 occurred while his company was performing in the building. In 1812, Placide became a co-manager with William Twaits and Jean Baptiste Casmiere Breschard of the Olympic Theatre in New York.

He was married to Charlotte Wrighten Placide and father of Jane Placide.
