= Charlotte Wrighten Placide =

American actress and opera singer

Charlotte Wrighten Placide (c. 1776–1823), was an American actress and opera singer. She had a successful career from 1796, was the female star of the theatre company of Placide and the director of the Charleston Theatre in 1812–13.

== Life and career ==
She was born to the British singer Mary Ann Wrighten Pownall. She was engaged at the Old American Company at the John Street Theatre in 1792-95 and at the Charleston Theatre from 1795.

In 1796 she married Alexander Placide and became the mother of four, including Jane Placide. Her husband was the manager of the Charleston Theatre in 1799-1812, and she often played the main female roles at the productions of the husband's theater, which was at that time the only one in Charleston and South Carolina.

She was not only an actor, but also performed as a singer.
