= Walnut Street Theatre =

Oldest theatre in the United States

- The New Circus (1809–1811); The Olympic (1812–1820, 1822–1828)
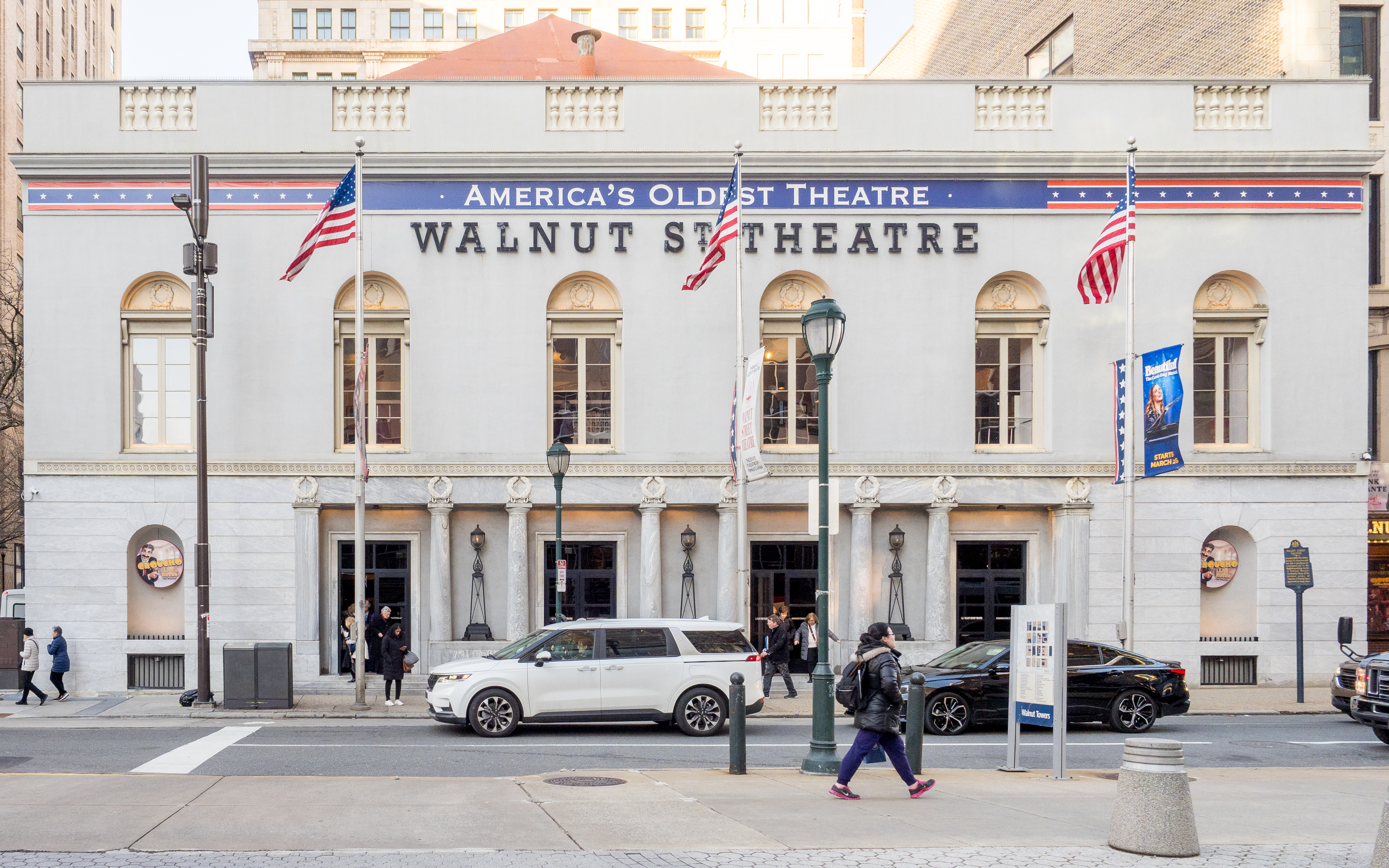
- Walnut Street Theatre in 2024
- Interactive map of Walnut Street Theatre
- Address: 825 Walnut Street; Philadelphia, Pennsylvania; United States
- Owner: Walnut Street Theatre Company (non-profit)
- Capacity: 1,054
- Designation: National Historic Landmark
- Public transit: 9th-10th & Locust: PATCO Speedline
- Walnut Street Theatre
- U.S. National Register of Historic Places
- U.S. National Historic Landmark
- Pennsylvania state historical marker
- Location within Philadelphia Location within Pennsylvania Location within the United States
- Coordinates: 39°56′54″N 75°9′20″W
- Built: 1809
- Architectural style: Classical revival
- NRHP reference No.: 66000693

Significant dates
- Added to NRHP: October 15, 1966
- Designated NHL: December 29, 1962
- Designated PHMC: September 25, 1996

Construction
- Opened: 1809
- Rebuilt: 1828, John Haviland; 1903, Willis Hale; 1920, William H. Lee
- Architect: William Strickland

Website
- walnutstreettheatre.org

Walnut Street Theatre, founded in 1808 at 825 Walnut Street, on the corner of S. 9th Street in the Washington Square West neighborhood of Philadelphia, is the oldest operating theatre in the United States.

The venue is operated by Walnut Street Theatre Company, a non-profit organization, and has three stages: the Mainstage, for the company's primary and larger productions, the Independence Studio on 3, a studio located on the building's third floor for smaller productions, and the Studio 5 on the fifth floor, which is rented out for independent productions.

== Design ==
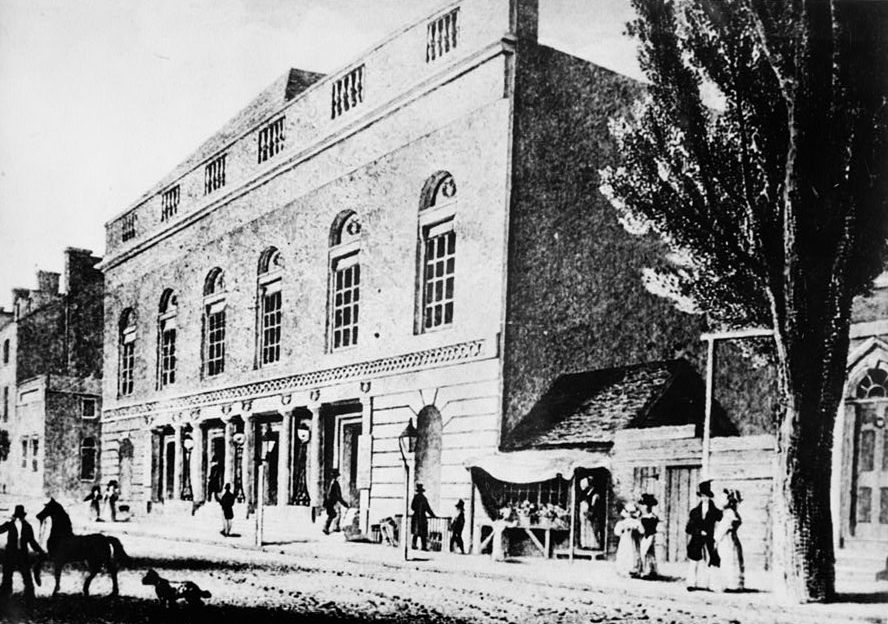
An 1830 illustration of Walnut Street Theatre

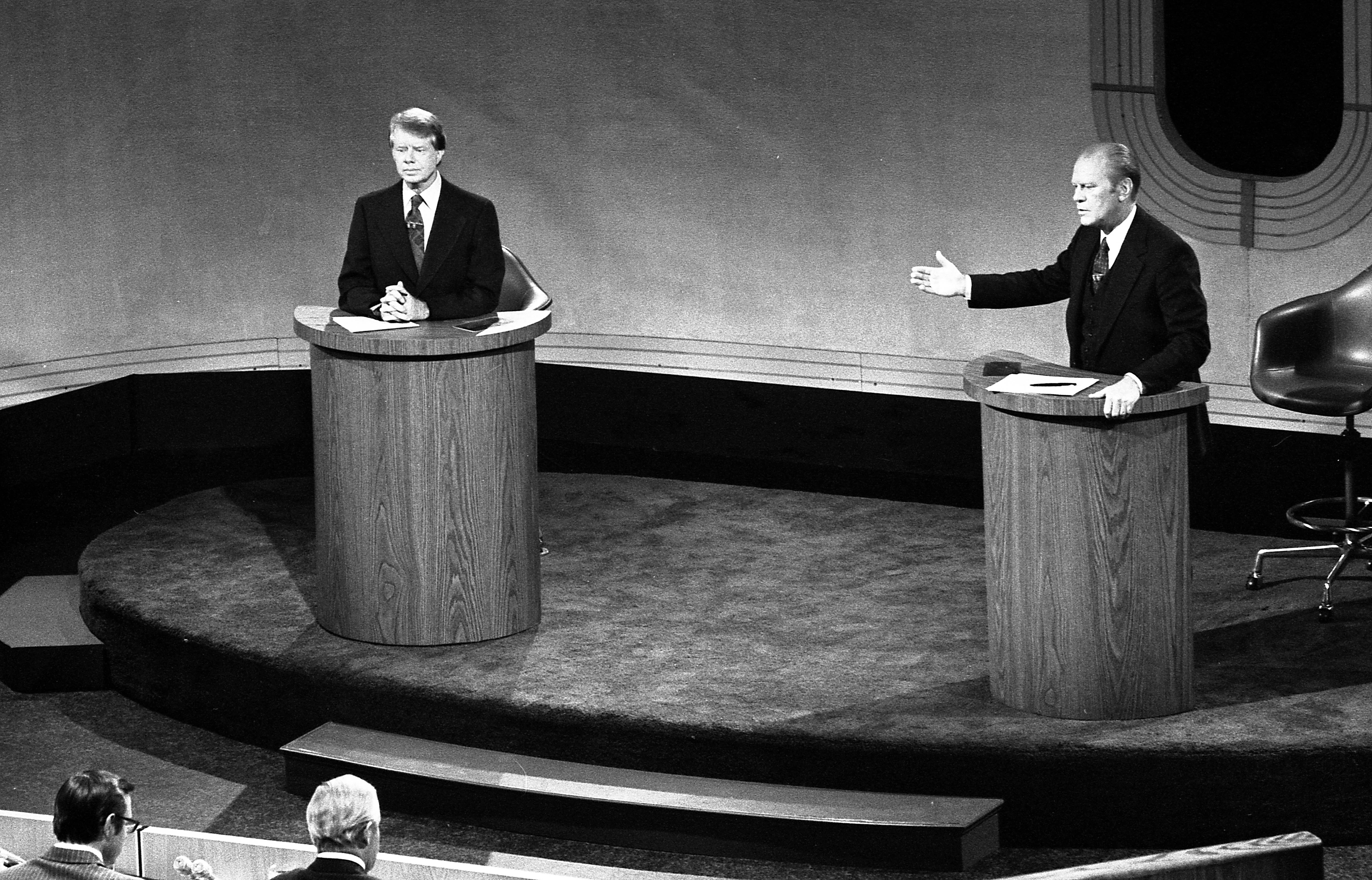
Jimmy Carter and Gerald Ford debate domestic policy at Walnut Street Theatre during the 1976 presidential election on September 23, 1976

When it was first constructed in 1809, the New Circus had no stage, just a ring of sawdust marking the performance area. It was made of brick due to the Philadelphia fire code, unlike other venues built by Pepin and Breschard. It had a peaked roof and a dome with a flagpole on top of it, becoming Philadelphia's tallest building. In 1820, the dome on the building was removed for sound quality improvements. The original brick façade was replaced with a Greek Revival one in 1828.

Walnut Street Theatre was the first theatre to install gas footlights in 1837. In 1855, it was also the first theatre to feature air conditioning. The theatre switched to electric chandeliers and footlights in 1892. The theatre had an interior renovation in 1970 to modernize it.

In May 2019, Walnut Street Theatre announced a major expansion, to begin in 2020.

In March 2020, the expansion was postponed six weeks from its initial groundbreaking due to the COVID-19 pandemic.

== History ==
=== 19th century ===
A parcel of land owned by John Brown on the corner of Walnut and 9th Street in Philadelphia was sold to Victor Pépin and Jean Baptiste Casmiere Breschard for $11,058 on October 4, 1808. A theatre, going by the name of The New Circus, was built on the parcel by the pair, who formed the Circus of Pepin and Breschard, which toured the United States from 1807 to 1815.

Pépin and Breschard constructed numerous venues in cities along the U.S. East Coast, which often featured, along with performances of their circus, classical plays as well as horse dramas. Their first show was performed on February 2, 1809.

In 1811, the two partners commissioned architect William Strickland to design and construct a stage and orchestra pit for theatrical performances. They also bought another parcel of land from Brown for $6,250 on February 1, 1811, to increase the size of the theatre. The theatre's name was changed to The Olympic, with a reopening on January 1, 1812. The first theatrical productions staged at The Olympic were The Rivals and The Poor Soldier. The Olympic was known for performing hippodramas.

The building was put up for auction in a sheriff's sale on February 5, 1813, but there were no bids and the lien holder James Clemson gained control of it. Charles Bird, an attorney, bought the building at a public auction on November 29, 1814, for $12,650. Pépin re-purchased the building on October 21, 1818, with the help of a group of stockholders, for $34,000. He then, in turn, sold it to an attorney and two merchants for the same price and they established a trust with 115 members known as the Proprietors of Walnut Street Theatre. William B. Wood and William Warren, who managed the Chestnut Street Theatre until it burned down in 1820, leased the theatre on Walnut Street and paid for renovations to the building.

They renamed it Walnut Street Theatre in 1820, with an opening performance of Wild Oats and The Agreeable Surprise in November 1820. The name of the theatre was changed back to The Olympic with its reopening on September 3, 1822, for equestrian and theatrical performances. The building was scheduled to be demolished in 1827, but the owners instead renovated it. The theatre became Walnut Street Theatre again by 1828. Edwin Booth and John Sleeper Clarke purchased the theatre on October 5, 1863, for $100,000. In March 1871, Clarke bought out Booth's share of the theatre.

In 1920, a new building was planned to replace the existing one, but zoning codes made it infeasible at the time.

=== 20th century ===
In June 1923, the Marx Brothers premiered their first show, I'll Say She Is at Walnut Street Theatre.

Between 1932 and 1940, the theatre ran movies and hosted vaudeville and burlesque shows when it was not dark. The theatre became part of The Shubert Organization in 1941. A court ordered The Shubert Organization to divest from some of their properties in 1956, including Walnut Street Theatre.

On October 15, 1966, Walnut Street Theatre was designated a National Historic Landmark, and in 1969, the theatre was purchased by a non-profit organization and turned over to the new Walnut Street Theatre Corporation. On September 23, 1976, it was the site of the first presidential debate between Gerald R. Ford and Jimmy Carter.

The theatre housed the Philadelphia Drama Guild until 1981. Walnut Street Theatre Company, a non-profit regional producing company, was formed in 1983 by Bernard Havard. In 1984, Walnut Street Theatre School was established and over 1,200 students enroll annually, and 1986 saw the introduction of the Independence Studio on 3 series. The company produces five productions per season on the theatre's main stage.

=== 21st century ===
In 2008, the theater celebrated its 200th season of live entertainment. In 2010, it was the most subscribed theatre company in the world with 56,000 subscribers.

==== COVID-19 and controversy ====
On March 23, 2020, the City of Philadelphia issued a stay-at-home order, forcing all nonessential businesses, including arts and cultural institutions, to cease live performances. The theatre canceled the remainder of its 2019–20 season thereafter.

In April 2020, in response to the pandemic and performance cancellations, the Walnut created a mini-series entitled "My Walnut Story." This series of nearly 100 personally submitted video testimonials highlighted the positive impact the Walnut has had on the lives and careers of former actors, designers, staff, apprentices, and more.

During COVID-19-related shutdowns, the performing arts industry in the United States experienced significant upheaval. A gathering led by former employees protested on June 18, 2021, after accusations made on social media led to a cease-and-desist letter being sent to a former employee.

Throughout the protest, former employees and members of the Philadelphia arts community shared accounts of racism, pay inequities, and other forms of discrimination experienced at the Walnut.

== Notable productions and performers ==
Productions

- I'll Say She Is with the Marx Brothers (June 1923) (Harpo, Chico, Groucho, and Zeppo)
- A Streetcar Named Desire with Marlon Brando (1947)
- Mister Roberts with Henry Fonda (1948)
- Gigi with Audrey Hepburn (1951)
- The Diary of Anne Frank with Susan Strasberg (1955)
- A Raisin in the Sun with Sidney Poitier (1959)
- A Man For All Seasons starring Paul Scofield (1961)
- Sunday in New York with Robert Redford (1961)

Performers

Famous performers who have also appeared at the theatre include Ethel Barrymore, Edwin Booth, George M. Cohan, Claudette Colbert, Jane Fonda, Edwin Forrest, Julie Harris, Helen Hayes, Katharine Hepburn, Mark Indelicato, Samuel L. Jackson, Jack Lemmon, Rob McClure, Mike Nichols, George Peppard, Harold Perrineau, Edward G. Robinson, Laura San Giacamo, Marina Sirtis, Lucas Steele, Jarrod Spector, George C. Scott, Jessica Tandy and Ethel Waters.

== See also ==
- List of National Historic Landmarks in Philadelphia
- National Register of Historic Places listings in Center City, Philadelphia
