= Aqua drama =

Theatrical genre

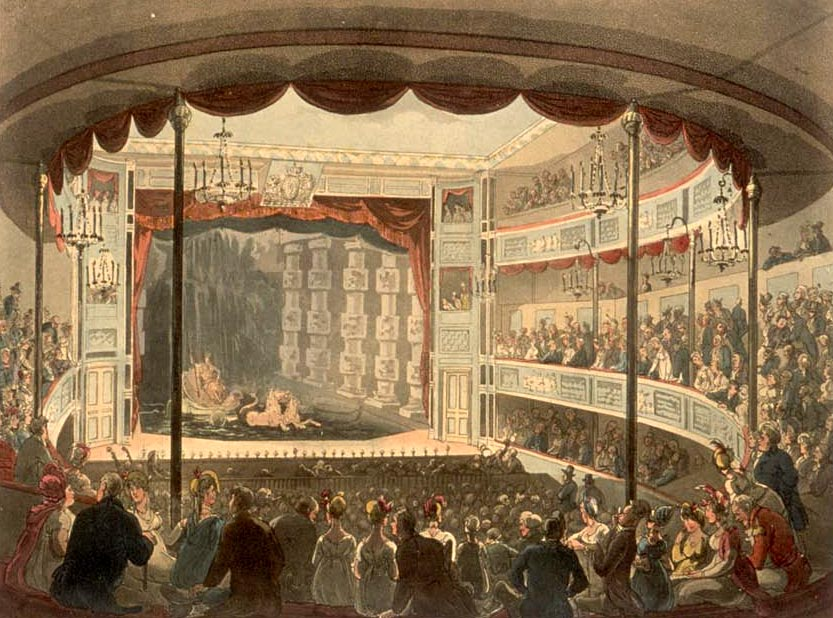
A performance at Sadler's Wells, circa 1808.

The theatrical genre of aqua drama that was popular in 19th century France, England, and the United States involved flooding the arenas of circuses for recreations of major naval conflicts and similar aquatic events; some venues participated to such a great extent in this once-popular form as to install permanent water-tanks on stage. Water-based spectacles, especially those portraying great naval battles, had been popular in Roman times, when they were known as naumachia, and the custom was resurrected at various times during the Middle Ages.

== Beginning ==
At the start of the 19th century, the already established Sadler's Wells Theatre came under the management of Charles Dibdin, Jr., a man who had big plans for the theatre's future. In 1804, he installed a large 90x24x3ft water tank that covered the entire stage. The water used to fill the tank was pumped in from the New River, which was adjacent to the theatre, by an Archimedes wheel. This process took twelve men twelve hours: four men would work in four hour shifts and then rotate until the entire tank was full. Even though the tanks were drained and refilled every three weeks they would become filthy. The water would become dirty not only from the shows, but the actors would bathe in the tank, along with rowdy audience members jumping in to see if the water was real. The Aquatic Drama was popular in the early 19th century, and with Sadler's Wells on the outskirts of London, the audiences, especially in the pit were unruly, loud, and most likely drunk. The large water tank that these disruptive audience members would jump into was not the only tank in the theatre, Dibdin Jr. had a second 5x5x5 ft tank above the theatre that was used to simulate waterfalls.

== 19th century performances ==
The first show Dibdin, Jr. and his crew put on was The Siege of Gibraltar. It opened in 1804, and it was a play that depicted the naval battle between the English Navy and the Spanish Armada. A playbill from this performance describes the battle in the show:

"the conflagration of the town in various places, the defense of the garrison, and attack by the floating batteries, [which] is so faithfully and naturally represented, that when the floating batteries take fire, some blowing up with a dreadful explosion, and others, after burning to the water’s edge, sink to the bottom; while the gallant Sir Roger Curtis appears in his boat to save the drowning Spaniards, the British tars for that purpose plunging into the water, the effect is such as to produce an unprecedented climax of astonishment and applause."

There were 177 ships on the liquid stage, all equipped with live guns and ready for battle. Over a hundred real scale sized naval ships would not have been able to fit in Sadler's Wells tanks, so Dibdin hired men who worked at the Woolwich Dockyards to build him smaller ships built at a one-inch per foot scale, with exact detailed imitation down to the rigging. Children were cast as some of the Spanish naval officers manning the tiny ships, and were seen “drowning” after the Spanish had been defeated. The climactic battle of the show was when the English and Spanish went head on, full force, with guns blazing, and the audience members saw incredible spectacle as the English triumphantly destroyed the Spanish Armada.

In 1823 Sadler's Wells presented the aqua drama entitled The Island or Christian and His Comrades which dramatized the main events of the Mutiny on board HMS Bounty. In order to alleviate a twenty-minute delay between a dry land scene and an aquatic scene, the stage was made to ascend to near the roof of the theatre, in full view of the audience.

== The Fall ==
Eventually the aqua drama slash began to ripple then calm as audience members were no longer pleased with what was being performed at Sadler's Wells. This could have been due to the fact that Dibdin, Jr. tried to reuse many of his 177 ships from the Siege of Gibraltar, and they were no longer new and exciting to the audiences, but also the Napoleonic wars could have contributed. According to Dan Cuickshank at BBC News, the Napoleonic wars were raging on during the early 1800s and England dipped its toes in the war waters in 1793 with the new Revolutionary France. After a decade of fighting the two countries finally signed at the Treaty of Amiens, which only lasted a month until in May 1803 war broke out between the two countries again. The initial declaration of war could have sparked a rise in nationalism with in England, being a contributing factor into the Dibden, Jr. and his aquatic drama's success. Britain was known for having a large and powerful navy, and they didn't mind flexing their muscles as they asserted themselves as the most powerful navy in Europe at the 1815 after their victory at Waterloo. The citizens of England would have known how powerful their countries navy was. Seeing shows, such as the ones being put at Sadler's Wells, reminded the English people of how strong their military was, making them feel proud and safe initially. Yet, after a few years into the war the citizens began to realize the horrors of war. According to Mather, they were exposed not only to the death of friends and family along with the fear of invasion, but also the raising of taxes to fund the military. A staggering 11.6 million, which is around 570 million pounds in today's market, was spent on forts alone, most of which were protecting dock yards. The British people became fed up with war, especially naval combat and eventually the tanks were taken out of the theatre. Removal of the tanks due to lack of popularity reflects the English nation's view of war.

== Legacy ==
Even though the tanks were removed in 1824, aqua drama was a part of a long lasting theatre's history. The legacy left behind of aquatic theatre is only a few pages in books and websites, and a painting or two, but Sadler's Wells legacy has been alive and well since Richard Sadler first opened his music house in 1683. Since then the theatre has seen many triumphs and tragedies. After Charles Dibdin, Jr. resigned there was a false fire alarm during one of the shows which lead to 18 people being stampeded to death.

In 1843 the theater was once again successful, as the actor manager Samuel Philips put on Shakespeare's plays. Sadly, in 1915 the doors to Sadler's Wells were closed. Lilian Baylis, who wanted everyone in London to have the privilege to see the mesmerizing art of theatre, raised the money to reopen Sadler's Wells. The Sadler's Wells legacy continued as it was once again able to share theatre's magic with the people of northern London in 1931. After many years of putting on progressive theatre that entertained northern London, the play aspect of Sadler's Wells eventually faded out, opera and dance became prominent. Around 1945 Sadler's Wells started to become a strictly dance performance hall. The theatre legacy was replaced over the next half century as the once music hall become an outstanding, well respected dance hall. Sadler's Wells still stands today, not in the same building, but with the murky water of Charles Dibdin, Jr.’s aquatic theatre running in its historic veins.

== New York ==
New York City's Lafayette Circus (1826-1829) boasted equipment for both equestrian, or "Hippodrama", and aquatic dramas.

On July 4, 1840, The Bowery Theatre in New York City produced The Pirates Signal. An immense stage was entirely covered by water upon which a full-rigged ship maneuvered. The scene took place upon the decks of the ship itself.
