= John Bill Ricketts =

English circus owner in the United States

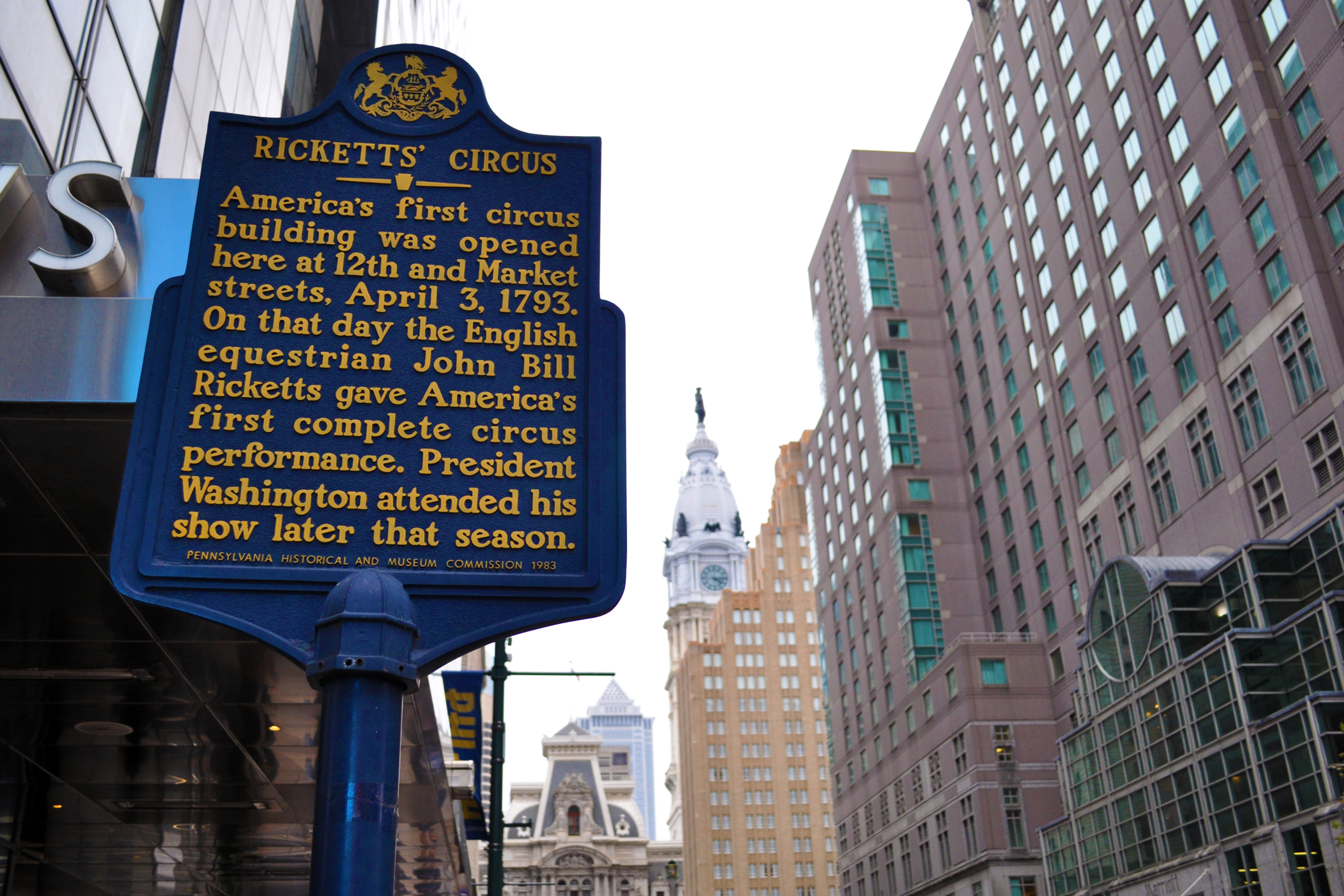
Ricketts' Circus Historical Marker at 12th and Market Sts. Philadelphia PA

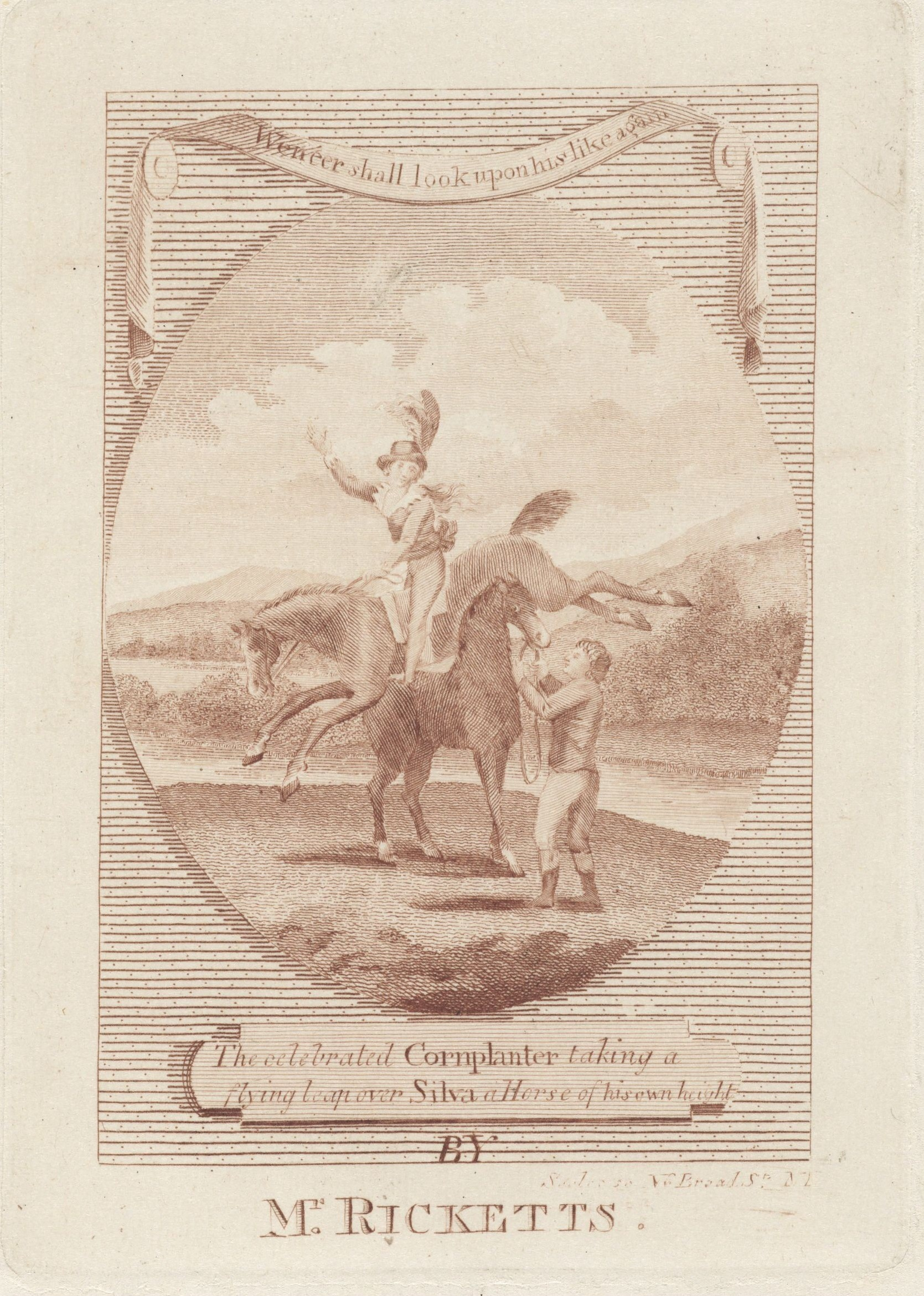
Ricketts and his horse, Cornplanter, performing

John Bill Ricketts (1769–1802) was an English equestrian who brought the first modern circus to the United States.

== Biography ==
Ricketts began his theatrical career with the Royal Circus and Equestrian Philharmonic Academy, in London, in the 1780s. He emigrated from Britain, in 1792, to establish his first circus, in Philadelphia. There, he built “Ricketts' Art Pantheon and Amphitheatre”, a circus building, in the fall of 1792, in which he conducted a riding school. After training a group of Pennsylvania horses, on April 3, 1793, he gave America's first complete circus performance, which began a series of exhibitions two to three times a week. In 1797, Ricketts commemorated the retirement of his friend and fellow Freemason George Washington with a special performance. He soon performed for the president's successor, John Adams. On 5 September 1797 he established the first circus in Canada, in Montreal.

In December 1799, three days after the death of Washington, his circus building burned down. Ricketts sailed to the West Indies on the schooner Sally, but the ship was intercepted by a French privateer and taken to the island of Guadeloupe. Eventually, Ricketts was able to recover some of his horses and property and even managed to perform some shows on Guadeloupe. He recovered his fortunes enough to charter a small, if unreliable, ship, intending to return to England; along the voyage, the ship sank, and all on board were lost.

== Gilbert Stuart portrait ==
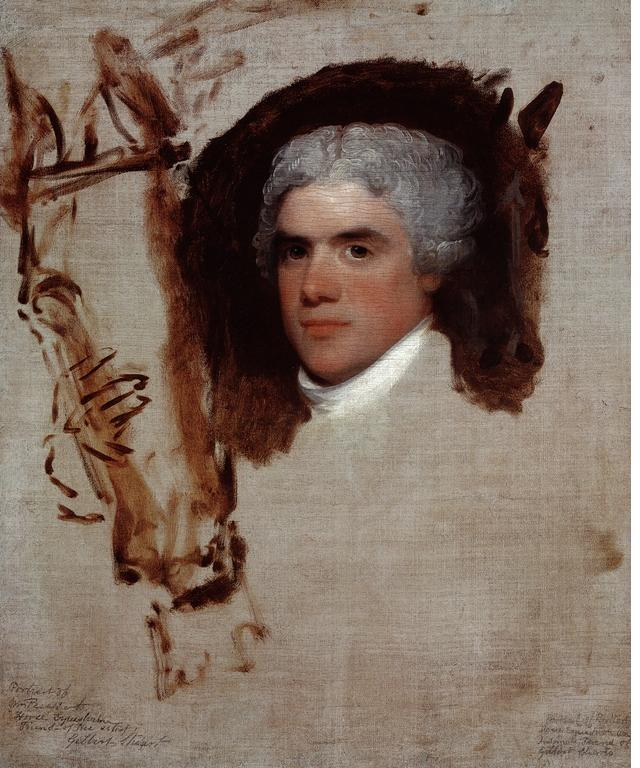
John Bill Ricketts, aka, Breschard, the Circus Rider, by Gilbert Stuart

Ricketts is identified as the subject of an unfinished portrait of ca. 1795–99 by Gilbert Stuart. The painting's current provenance includes the sitter's brother, Francis Ricketts; it was later owned by Peter Grain and George Washington Riggs. In 1879, George C. Mason published The Life and Works of Gilbert Stuart, in which he described the painting as "an unfinished picture, which, there is strong reason for believing, was painted by Stuart" and identified the subject as Breschard, the Circus Rider. It was under this title that the painting was displayed at the Museum of Fine Arts, Boston in 1880. In 1942 the painting entered the collection of the National Gallery of Art, which changed the identification to "John Bill Ricketts" by 1947.

== See also ==
- History of juggling
