= Anthony Street Theatre =

Defunct New York theatre

Coordinates: 40.717°N 74.005°W

The Anthony Street Theatre was an early New York City theatre which operated intermittently from 1812 to 1821. It opened as the Olympic Theatre in May 1812 and had multiple names during its brief existence.

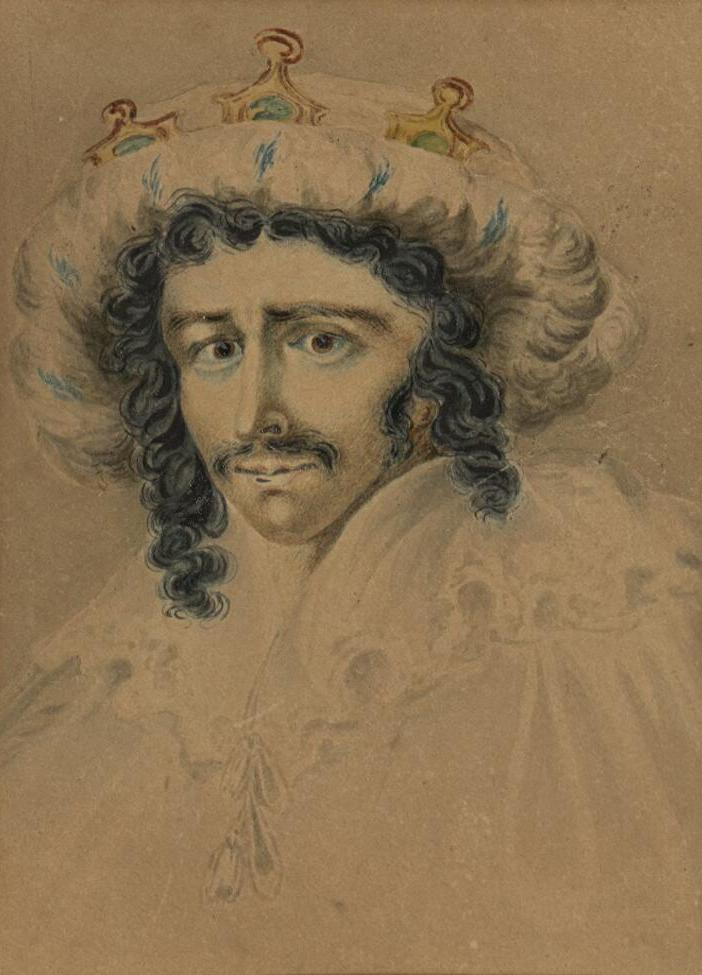
Portrait of Edmund Kean as Richard III, which he played at the theatre in 1820

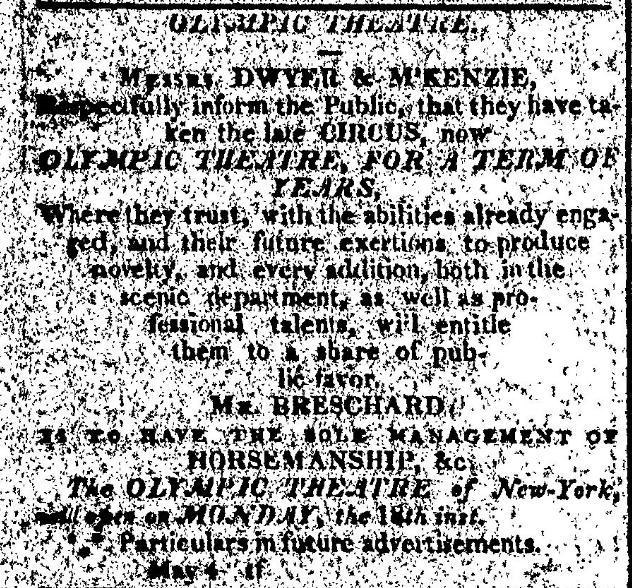
Advertisement for the new Olympic Theatre in May 6, 1812 New York Evening Post

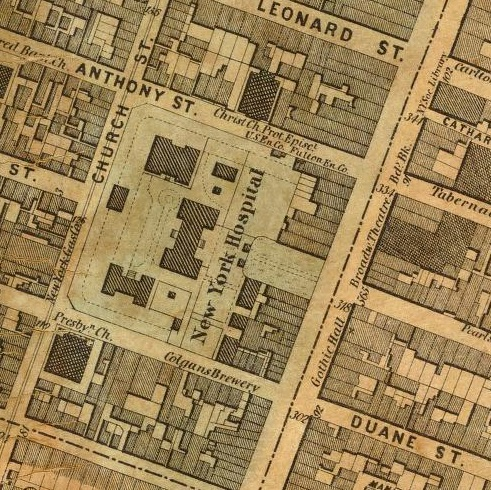
Christ Church shown on 1852 map, former location of the theatre.

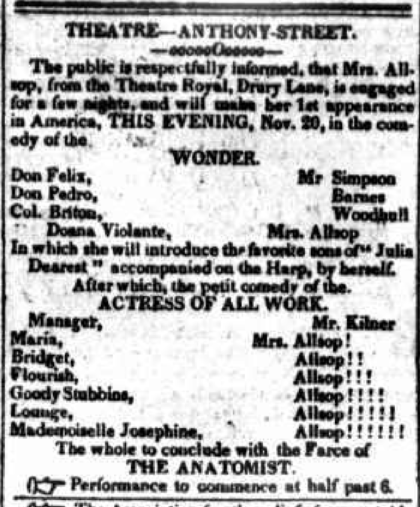
Advertisement in the November 20, 1820 New York Evening Post for Frances Alsop appearing in a performance of Wonder (a 1714 play by Susanna Centlivre).

== History ==
The theatre was converted from a circus building used by Pepin and Breschard and located at 79-85 Anthony Street (which is now Worth Street) in Manhattan. (The circus appears to have relocated to Broadway at the corner of White Street. However, there is much confusion among old sources between these two locations.) The first serious competition to the Park Theatre, the venue opened on May 22, 1812, managed by John Dwyer and Donald McKenzie as the Olympic Theatre. The first performance was The Way to Get Married, followed by "grand feats of horsemanship by Mr. Breschard and Company", and a farce called The Spoild Child.

By July 1812 the theatre came under the management of actor-manager William Twaits, along with Alexander Placide (but who died on July 26) and Breschard (who was still managing the horses); Twaits and Placide had come to New York after the disastrous Richmond Theatre fire in Richmond, Virginia, where they had been co-managers. Under Twaits, the Olympic was due to open with a production led by Charlotte Melmoth and Twaits, but while travelling to fulfil this engagement Melmoth was involved in a carriage accident, resulting in a severe fracture to her arm that failed to heal, forcing her to give up her acting career. Circus acts continued to appear here as well. The popular equestrian drama Timour the Tartar debuted in America at the Olympic in September 1812.

The theatre was renovated and redecorated in 1813 when it was named the Anthony Street Theatre, the Commonwealth Theatre in 1814, and the Pavilion Theatre in 1816, before reverting to the Anthony Street Theatre name in 1820.

== Final season ==
During the 1820–1821 season, the theatre was the home of the acting company of the Park Theatre while their own theatre was being rebuilt after having burnt down.

With this company Edmund Kean made his first appearance to much acclaim in New York in November 1820 in Richard III. Of Kean's performance, manager Edmund Simpson wrote, "Kean is with us and playing to great business, he averages about $1,000 a night. The people don't know exactly what to make of him. His strange manner surprises them, but his style gains more converts every night and before he leaves us I expect they will be unanimous in calling him, as they express it, the greatest creation they ever saw."

Virginius by James Sheridan Knowles was first performed in America at the theatre on September 25, 1820. Henry John Wallack had his New York debut at the theatre in the role of Young Norval on May 9, 1821. The season wrapped on July 6, 1821, with a benefit for Mr. Moreland, a performance of Douglas and Falls of Clyde.

The theatre was demolished in 1821 shortly after the Park Theatre company left, and the plot was bought for the Christ Episcopal Church.
