= Lafayette Circus (Manhattan) =

- Lafayette Circus
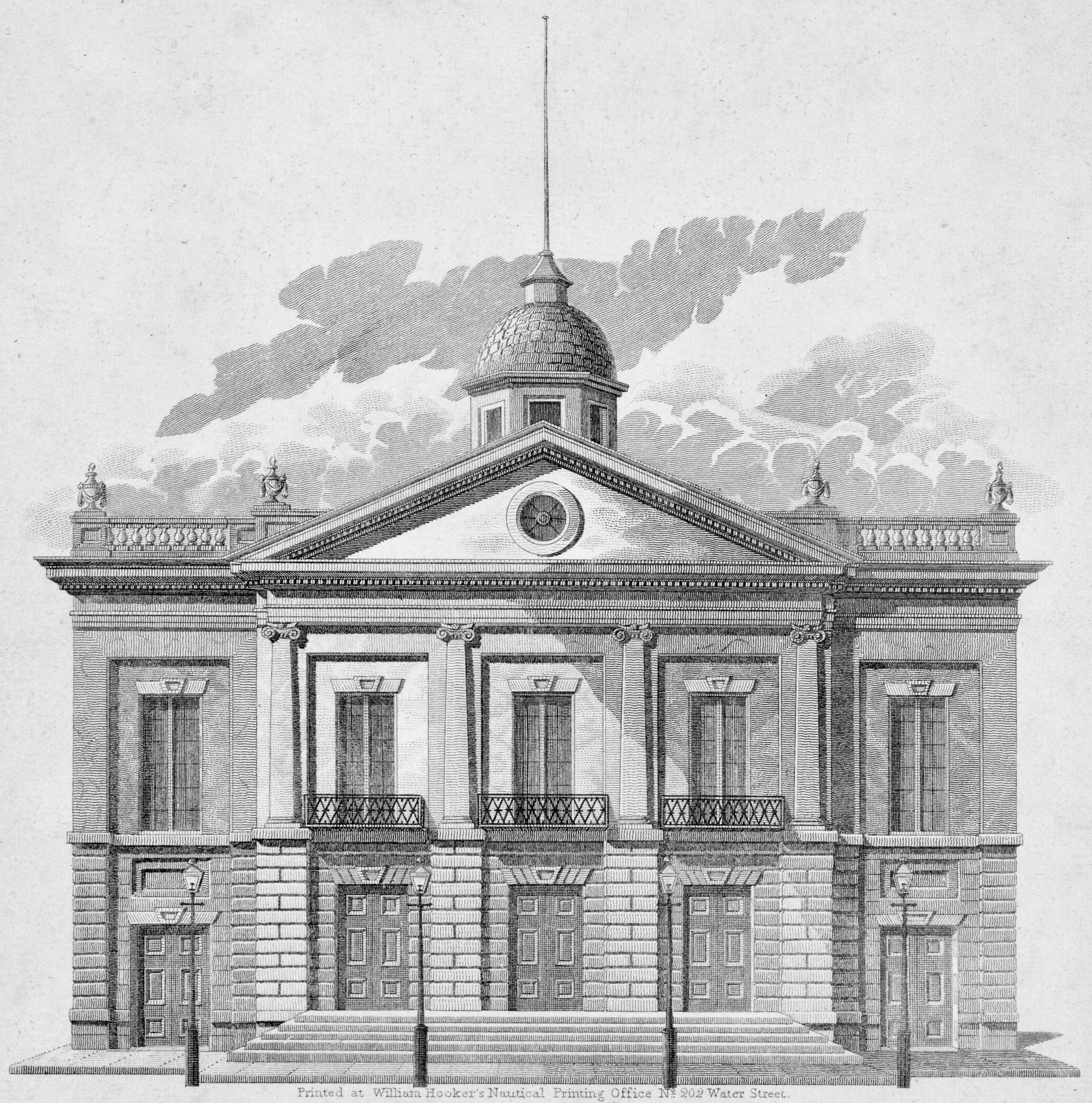
- Interactive map of Lafayette Circus

Lafayette Circus Theatre emerged in Manhattan in 1825 as an equestrian circus arena; in 1826–1827 it was rebuilt into a conventional theatre hall with an orchestra pit and advanced rigging. It boasted equipment for both equestrian (Hippodrama) and aquatic drama. The theatre was destroyed by fire in 1829.

Lafayette Circus (named after the Marquis de Lafayette) was built on the corner of Laurens Street (now West Broadway) and Grand Street by Charles W. Sandford. He led an eccentric life from 1796–1878 as one of New York’s favorite socialites. As a great lawyer he became a member of the New York Bar Association. He was also a land developer and speculator. In 1822, Charles Sanford started buying up parcels of land on Canal and Laurens St. to create a new business center on the northern edge of the city. His plan was that if the block of buildings could be successfully rented out as offices, stores and residences, he could turn a handsome profit as their value increased. The added luxury of a circus would make the surrounding land even more valuable and increase the number of visitors to the district. The newly erected theatre became the main attraction of a newly developed neighborhood. On February 27, 1825 the first ever Hippodramatic show on American soil premiered at the Lafayette when the last two acts of Richard III were staged with horses. Hippodrama, part drama and part circus, the intended main event, was a recent invention that evolved from circus and horsemanship shows of the 18th century. It emerged in England and France and quickly spread to the United States. Lafayette Circus was the first American theatre specifically designed for hippodrama, followed by the Philadelphia Amphitheater and the Baltimore Roman Amphitheatre.

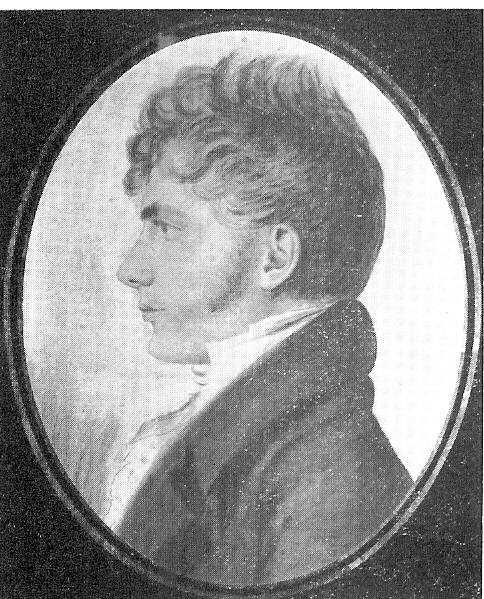
Peter Grain

The shows attracted lower classes, laborers and seamen, "ready to riot at the slightest provocations"; "in fact, much of recorded rowdyism of the mid-1820s" took place at Lafayette Circus. There were eleven recorded theatre riots in New York from 1825–30, four of which occurred at the Lafayette. Notable public disturbances and gang fights were recorded in December 1825 and in July 1826, when a watchman attempting to expel a prostitute barely escaped from the mob.

Horse drama and other para-theatrical shows failed at this theatre. in 1826 the circus was sold and became the Lafayette Theatre, redesigned by Peter Grain, architect and theatrical designer. In October 1827 the New York Mirror described the building as "the largest and most splendid ever erected for theatrical purposes in the United States. The stage with its scenery and machinery exceed all former attempts in this country". Nearly 100 feet wide and 120 feet deep, the stage was greater than anything existing in the United States or the United Kingdom. The audience held no gallery seating, only box seating and a raised rake pit. The interior is described as having of spacious, windowed lobbies with an elegant domed interior house that was well ventilated and included a gas chandelier. Stage lighting was described as "more natural"; a new lighting layout eliminated stage lamp ladders and allowed opening the whole width of the stage to the spectators.

== See also ==
- New York Hippodrome
- Hippodrama
