= Charlotte Melmoth =

American actress

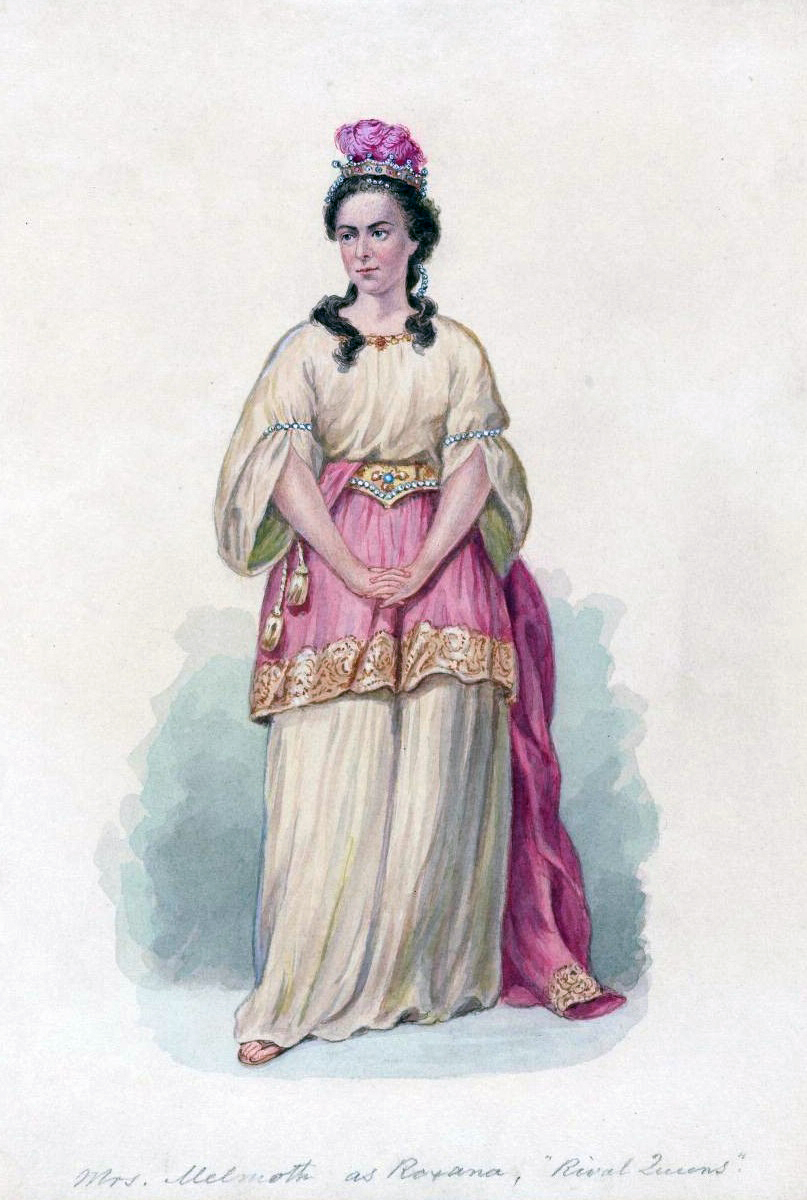
- Mrs Charlotte Melmoth as 'Roxana' in "The Rival Queens"
- Born: circa 1749
- Died: September 28, 1823; Brooklyn, New York
- Occupations: Actress, teacher
- Partner: Samuel Jackson Pratt (17??–1781; separated)
- Writing career
- Language: English, Irish

Mrs Charlotte Melmoth (c. 1749 – 1823) was an 18th-century English actress, the estranged spouse of British actor/writer Samuel Jackson Pratt ("Courtney Melmoth"), and known as "The Grande Dame of Tragedy on the Early American Stage". After a moderately successful stage career in Great Britain and Ireland, she emigrated to the United States of America in 1793 and became one of the best-known actresses of the late 18th/early 19th century.

== Early life ==
Little is known of Charlotte Melmoth's early years; she may have been an English farmer's daughter. Her birth name is uncertain. She first came to the attention of the British public in the late 18th century, as "Mrs Courtney Melmoth" part of an acting duo with her common-law husband, clergyman-turned actor Samuel Jackson Pratt. It is not known whether she adopted her husband's stage-surname "Melmoth" or, as has been speculated, "Melmoth" was her real surname and Pratt adopted it as his own stage name.

Most biographers give her year of birth as 1749, the same as Pratt's. However this would put her in her twenties in the early 1770s, when she first met Pratt, in contradiction of another biographer's claim that she was still at school when this meeting occurred. According to A History of The City of Brooklyn, Melmoth "had been duped into a sham marriage, while at boarding school, by a Mr. Pratt (known in the literary and theatrical circles of that day as Courtney Melmoth), and with him went upon the stage, playing in several companies both in England and Ireland." Pratt's parents strongly disapproved of the relationship and it is not known whether the marriage was legally formalised. The couple toured together in theatrical productions, not always successfully, and sometimes had to resort to telling fortunes to make their living. In 1773 the couple opened a theatre in Drogheda, County Louth, Ireland. The venture was not successful and the theatre failed within three months, whereupon the couple moved to London, where Melmoth began to achieve success as an actress, both at Covent Garden and Drury Lane. From 1776 to 1779 the couple played seasons in Edinburgh, London and Birmimgham.

=== Friendship with Benjamin Franklin ===
From 1777 to 1778, the couple were in Paris, where they made the acquaintance of Benjamin Franklin. The couple were present in January 1778 when Franklin gave a copy of his portrait to a certain Mrs Izard, but neglected to give a similar copy to Melmoth. The incident inspired Melmoth to write a poem, "Impromptu, To Doctor Franklin For the Author who was present when he gave his Portrait to a Lady", which Pratt sent to Franklin. Franklin replied, apologising for not realising that Melmoth also wanted a copy of the portrait.

The couple were by now experiencing serious financial problems — Pratt had already borrowed money from a friend, Mrs Montagu, and attempted to borrow money from Samuel Johnson) — and, on 29 January 1778, the day after receiving Franklin's response to Melmoth's poem, Pratt wrote to Franklin asking to borrow money from him, to which Franklin agreed. He then asked for a further loan four days later and, on 3 March begged Franklin for "a small allowance by week or month, in order to assist my slender Circumstances". A further request for money was made on 12 May, shortly before the "Melmoths" returned to England, to which Franklin replied that he found the requests for money "a greater inconvenience to myself than you perhaps imagined", but agreeing to the further loan, relying "on your Honour and Punctuality for the speedy Repayment". On 22 June 1778 Pratt wrote to Franklin from London regretting that he and Melmoth were unable to repay the money, whereupon the friendship with Franklin appears to have abruptly ended. By 1781 Pratt and Melmoth had separated, and Melmoth, retaining her professional surname, continued her acting career in Ireland. In 1793 she emigrated to the United States.

== Acting career ==
=== In Britain and Ireland ===
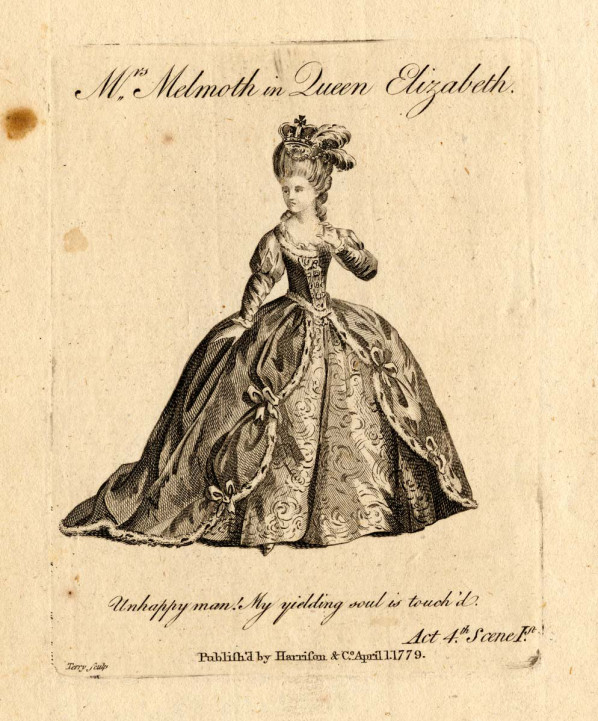
Charlotte Melmoth as Queen Elizabeth in The Earl of Essex 1779.

Melmoth made her stage debut in May 1773 at The Smock Alley Theatre, Dublin, playing Monimia in The Orphan. In late 1773 Melmoth and Pratt opened their own theatre in Drogheda, with a production of The Merchant of Venice, in which Melmoth played Portia to Pratt's Shylock, but the theatre failed and, after three months, the couple moved to London.

In February 1774 she debuted at Covent Garden as Calista in The Fair Penitent. Westminster Magazine reviewed her performance with the words, "Her figure is pleasing and also she is young and handsome ... she possesses the internal as well as external requisites of a good actress; for she discovers great feeling and sensibility; and indeed promises to be a great ornament to the theatre". Later that year, also at Covent Garden, she played Roxana in Nathaniel Lee's The Rival Queens or The Death of Alexander the Great, a role she would reprise at other times in her career. Amongst other roles she played at Covent Garden that season are Eleanor in Henry II, Hermione in A Winter's Tale and Queen Elizabeth in Henry Jones' tragedy, The Earl of Essex. In 1776 she played Edinburgh with her husband, where, among many other leading roles, she played Alicia in The Tragedy of Jane Shore, Viola in Twelfth Night and Mrs Belville in School for Wives. In Edinburgh she also played Lady Macbeth for the first time – a role for which she would eventually become famous.

In November 1776 she made her debut at Drury Lane as Lady Macbeth and the following February, reprised her role as Roxanne in The Rival Queens, alongside Mary Robinson. This would be her last appearance in London; the following year she and her husband were in Paris, then in 1778 and 1779 they played two seasons in Edinburgh, where Melmoth began to add Comic parts (including Lady Sneerwell in The School for Scandal) to her previously tragic repertoire. In late 1779, after a season in Birmingham, Melmoth's success seems to have faded for a while, and the couple travelled Britain seeking work, occasionally telling fortunes for a living.

By 1780 the couple had returned to where Melmoth's acting career had started: the Smock Alley Theatre in Dublin. They made their final appearance there as a couple in 1781, after which they separated and never met again. Melmoth toured the major cities of Ireland, playing in Cork, Limerick, Waterford, Derry and Belfast, eventually settling in Dublin. She played Smock Alley from 1782 to 1783, was the 'prima donna' of Leoni's Capel Street Opera House from 1783 to 1784, Owensons Fishamble Street Theatre from 1784 to 1785, returned to Smock Alley from 1785 to 1788, finally ending her Irish stage career at the Crow Street Theatre from 1788 to 1789.

According to The Thespian Dictionary, Melmoth converted to Roman Catholicism in 1786, shortly prior to her benefit performance in Dublin; the Dictionary suggests her motives were purely mercenary – increased ticket sales in a Catholic city – but most biographers believe her conversion to be sincere.

In July 1789 Melmoth announced her retirement from the theatre to open a school teaching filigree work to ladies, but the school was not a success and in 1793 Melmoth emigrated to the United States to resume her interrupted stage career.

=== In America ===
Arriving in New York in March 1793, Melmoth (advertised as 'From the Theatres Royal of London and Dublin') gave a series of recitations and Shakespearian monologues, held at Corre's Hotel throughout that April. The London Register reported that the event "afforded infinite delight to every rational mind".

Later that year she joined Hodgkinson's 'American Company' at the John Street Theatre, New York, making her debut on 20 November 1793 as Euphrasia in Arthur Murphy's The Grecian Daughter. Over the next five years she was to play many leading tragic roles for that company, including her most famous role as Lady Macbeth, becoming a 'universal favourite' for the excellence of her acting. She was acclaimed by leading American impresario, William Dunlap, as "the best tragic actress the inhabitants of New York, then living, had ever seen," and William Wood wrote of her "To a fine face and powerful voice she added an exquisite feeling of the pathetic which...left an impression which years fail to efface."

In 1794 she refused to speak the epilogue of a new opera, "Tammanay" by Ann Hatton, apparently disapproving of its patriotic sentiments. The New York Journal demanded a boycott of Melmoth's performances and called for her not to be "suffered to go on the New York stage again." Nevertheless, her popularity was undiminished and when the Park Theatre, New York, opened in 1798 Melmoth became one of its leading actresses.

Unfortunately, Melmoth, still playing youthful parts in her late-40s, was no longer in the prime of life, and her figure had grown bulky: "far beyond the sphere of embonpoint" as Dunlap commented. She had grown so large that, playing Euphrasia one night she invited another character to stab her, crying, as per the script, "Strike here! Here's blood enough!" at which the audience burst out laughing. She cut the line from all further performances.

Finally becoming aware of the limitations of her size, she took to playing older "matron" parts instead, at which she apparently excelled. She stayed with the Park Theatre until 1805, when she moved to the Chestnut Street Theatre in Philadelphia.

In 1811 she was travelling to fulfil an engagement at the Olympic Theatre, New York, when she was involved in a carriage accident, resulting in a severe fracture to her arm. Rumours that she had been killed circulated in the press. The fracture failed to heal properly and Melmoth reluctantly had to give up her acting career.

On 12 August 1812, after announcing her retirement from the stage, Melmoth gave her last performance – a 'benefit performance' to raise funds for her retirement – playing Fiammetta in The Tale of Mystery at the Olympic Theatre.

== Later life ==
Following her 1812 retirement, Melmoth supported herself on the proceeds of a 'respectable tavern' which she had already purchased while still acting, and opened a school for elocution in Washington Street, New York. Later she purchased a cottage in Red Hook Lane, Brooklyn (on present-day Carroll Street) where she established a boarding house and a school which she ran until her death. Her pupils included children from some of the wealthiest and best-known Brooklyn families, including the Cornell, Pierpoint, Cutting, Jackson, and Luquer families. John McCloskey, later Cardinal Archbishop of New York, was one of her pupils.

She died, aged 74, on 28 September 1823 and was buried in the Catholic graveyard surrounding the original St. Patrick's Cathedral on Mott and Prince streets in Manhattan. The Washington Quarterly obituary said of her "her talent, particularly in the higher walks of tragedy, was very generally acknowledged. She was much esteemed for her excellent private character."
