= Charles Balthazar Julien Févret de Saint-Mémin =

French engraver

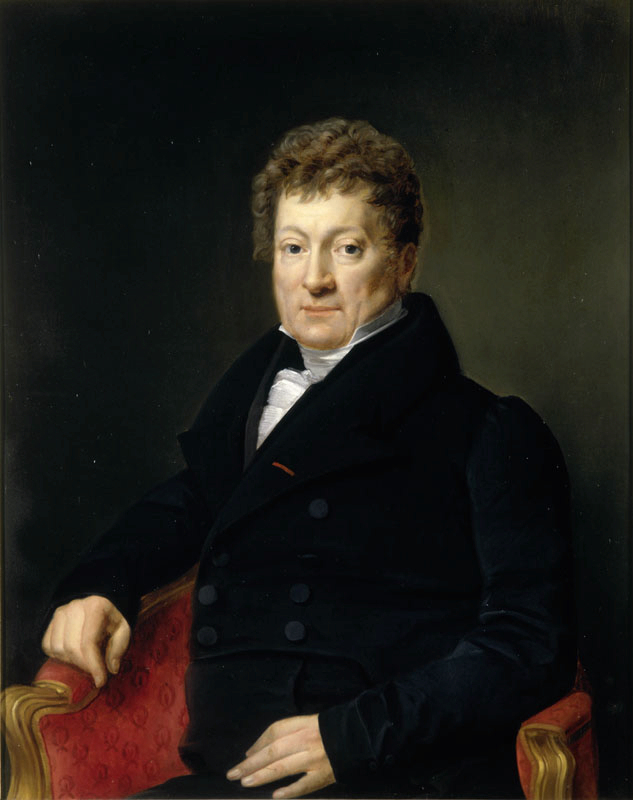
Self-portrait at the Musée des Beaux-Arts de Dijon (before 1837)

Charles Balthazar Julien Févret de Saint-Mémin (French pronunciation: [ʃaʁl baltazaʁ ʒyljɛ̃ fevʁɛ də sɛ̃ memɛ̃]; 1770–1852) was a French portrait painter and museum director. He left France during the Revolution, and worked as a portrait engraver in the United States in the early 19th century. He created portraits from life of George Washington, Thomas Jefferson, and others. He later served as museum director in Dijon.

== Brief history ==
Born in France in 1770 to Benigne Charles Fevret and Victoire Marie de Motmans, Saint-Memin was educated at École Militaire, Paris, graduating in 1785. In 1788 he served in the French Guards.

During the French Revolution, Saint-Memin and his family travelled to Switzerland, and then in 1793 to New York City. They intended to go to Saint-Domingue, ”to prevent the sequestration of the lands of his creole mother [However] in New York news of the sad fate of that colony made them decide to remain where they were. Faced with earning a living, they first tried raising vegetables, but ... this experiment proved inadequate.” Out of necessity, Saint-Memin taught himself to work portraits.

Saint-Memin lived in the United States from 1793 to 1814. During this period he created numerous portraits, often using the physiognotrace technique, invented in 1786 by Gilles-Louis Chretien. Portrait subjects included Alexander Macomb, John Marshall, Thomas Jefferson, George Washington, Christopher G. Champlin, and others.

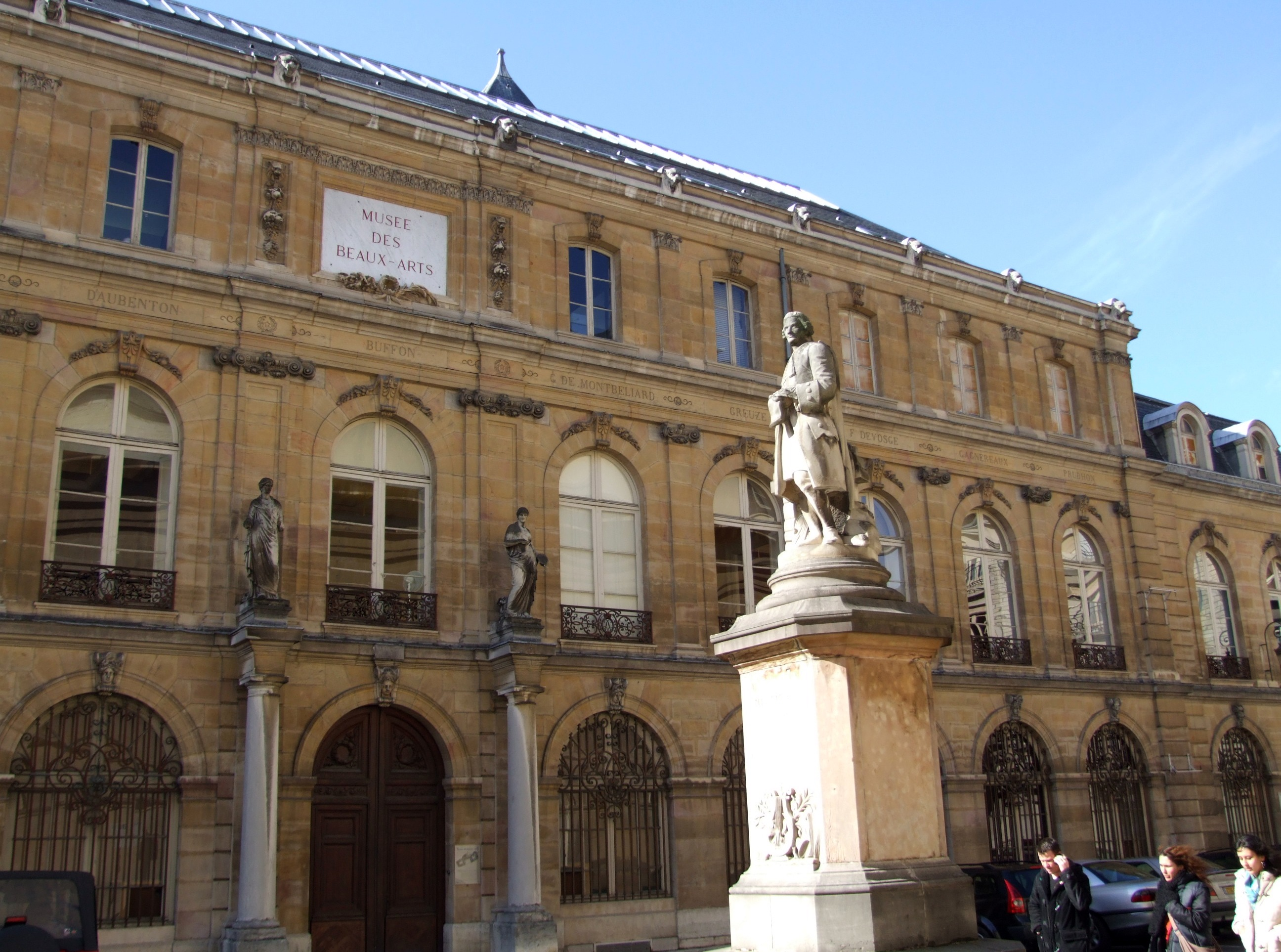
Musée des Beaux-Arts de Dijon

After returning to France, he worked as director of the Musée des Beaux-Arts de Dijon from 1817 to 1852. He died in Dijon on 23 June 1852.

== Selected works ==
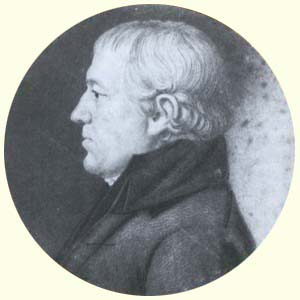
Richard Bassett (Smithsonian)

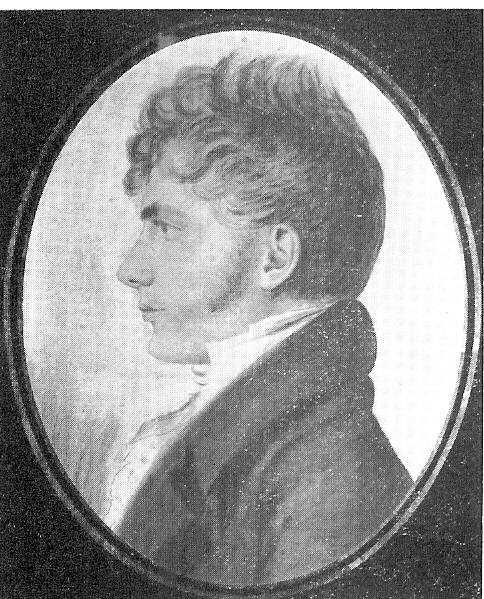
Pierre Michel Grain (Detroit Institute of Art)

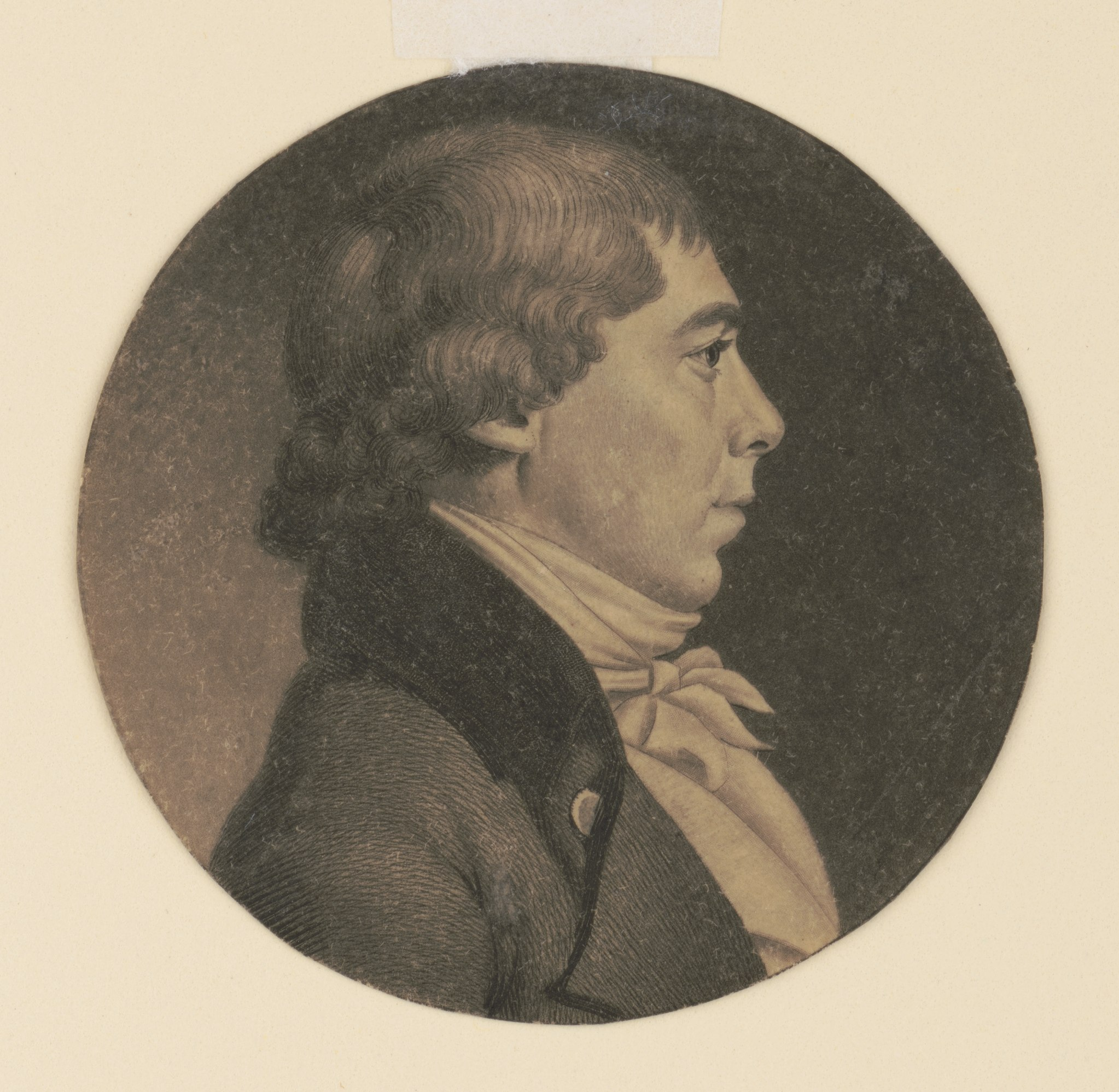
David Holmes. 1799 (Library of Congress)

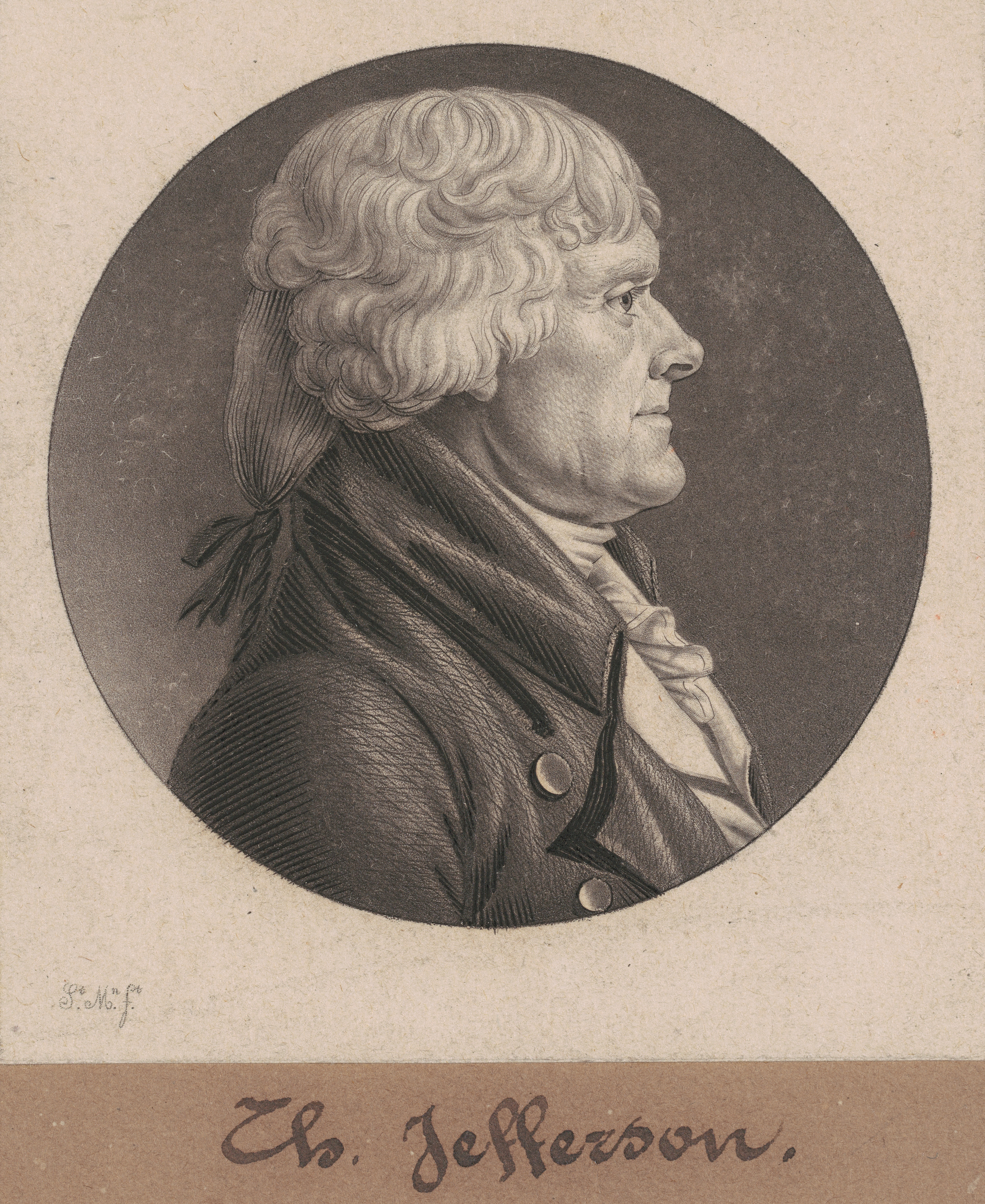
Thomas Jefferson (National Gallery of Art)

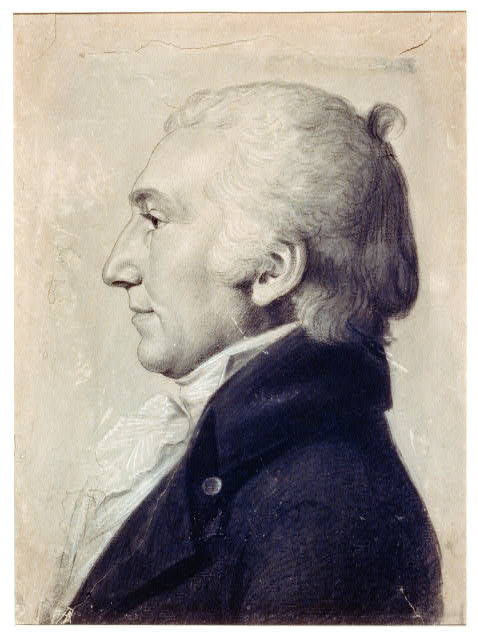
Michael Leib (Library of Congress)

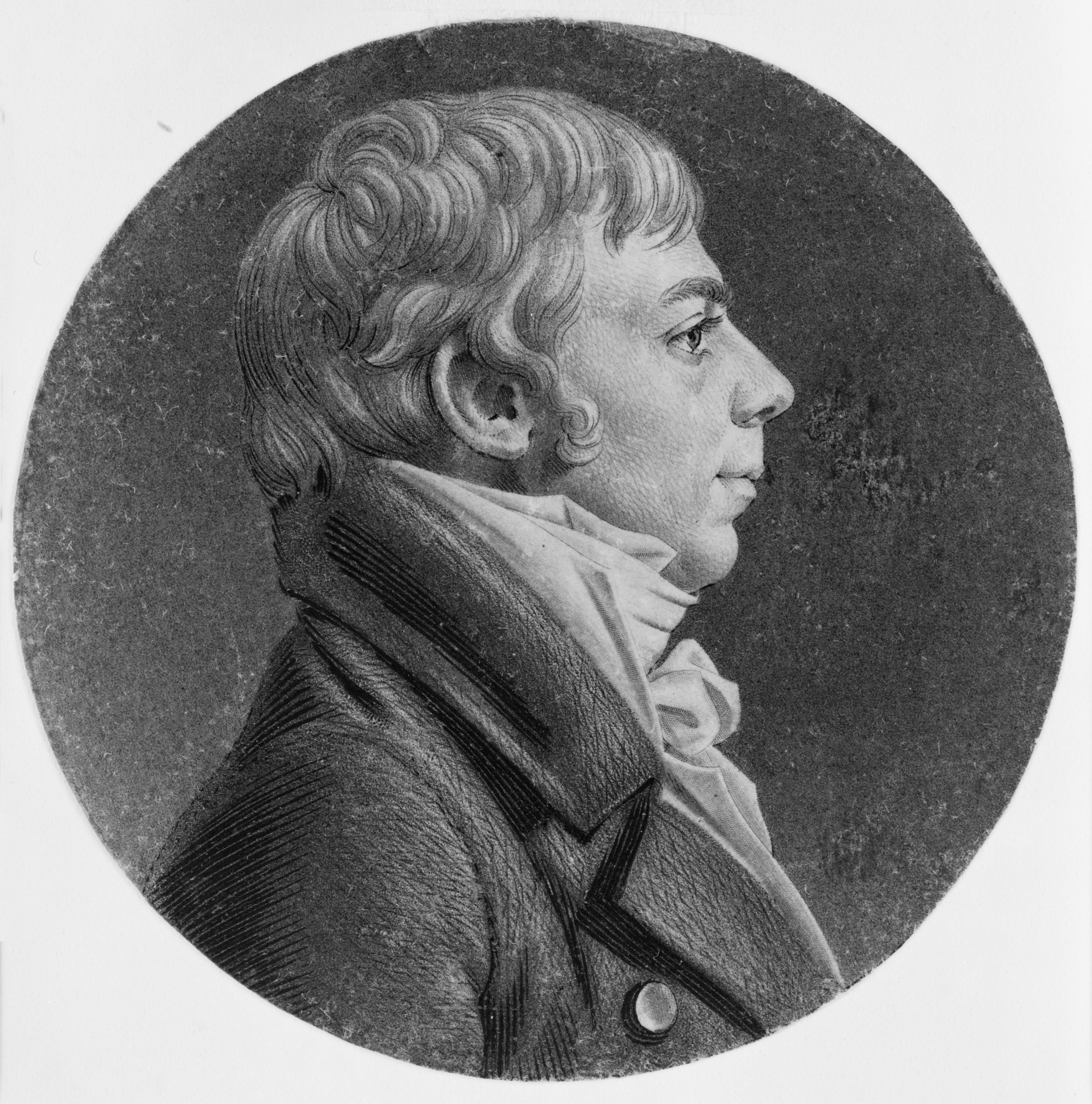
Thomas Lowndes. 1805 (Library of Congress)

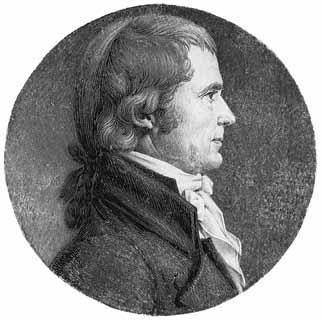
John Marshall. Engraving with ink and ink wash, 1808 (Library of Congress)

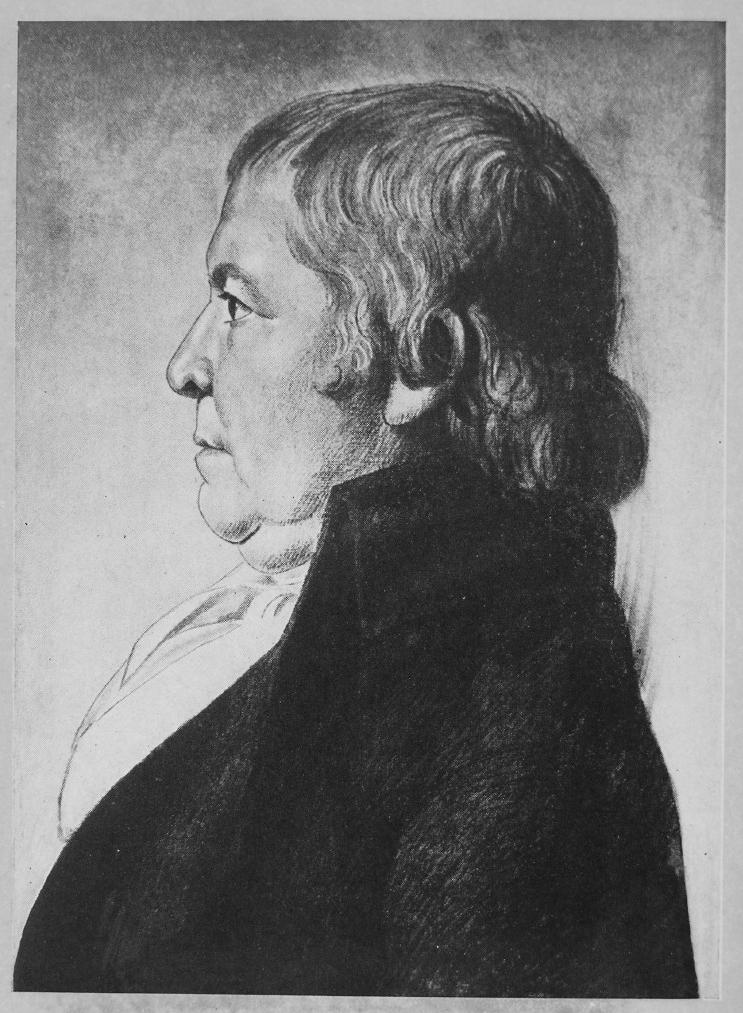
Paul Revere. Lithograph, c. 1915, after original drawing made in 1804.

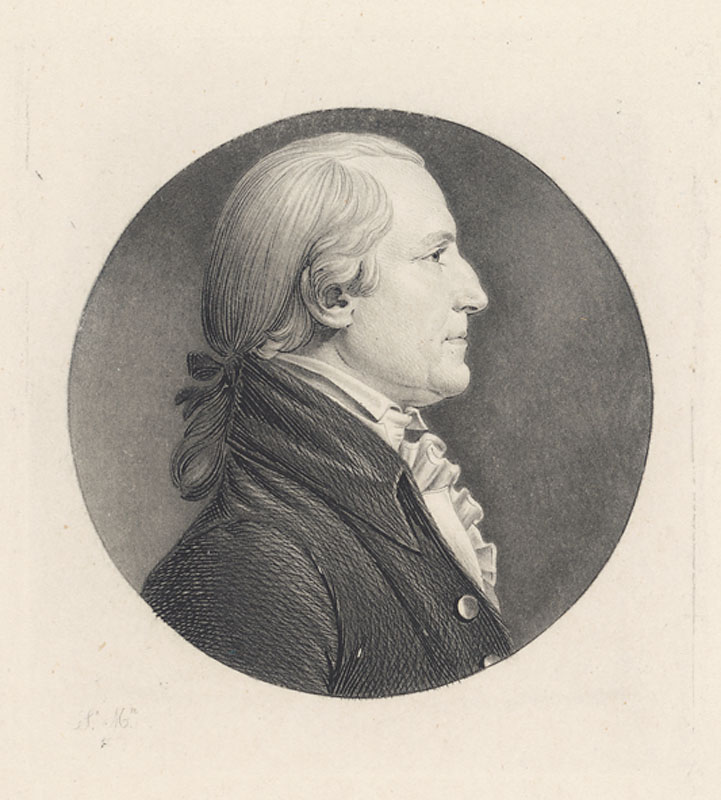
St. George Tucker. Engraving (Harvard University)

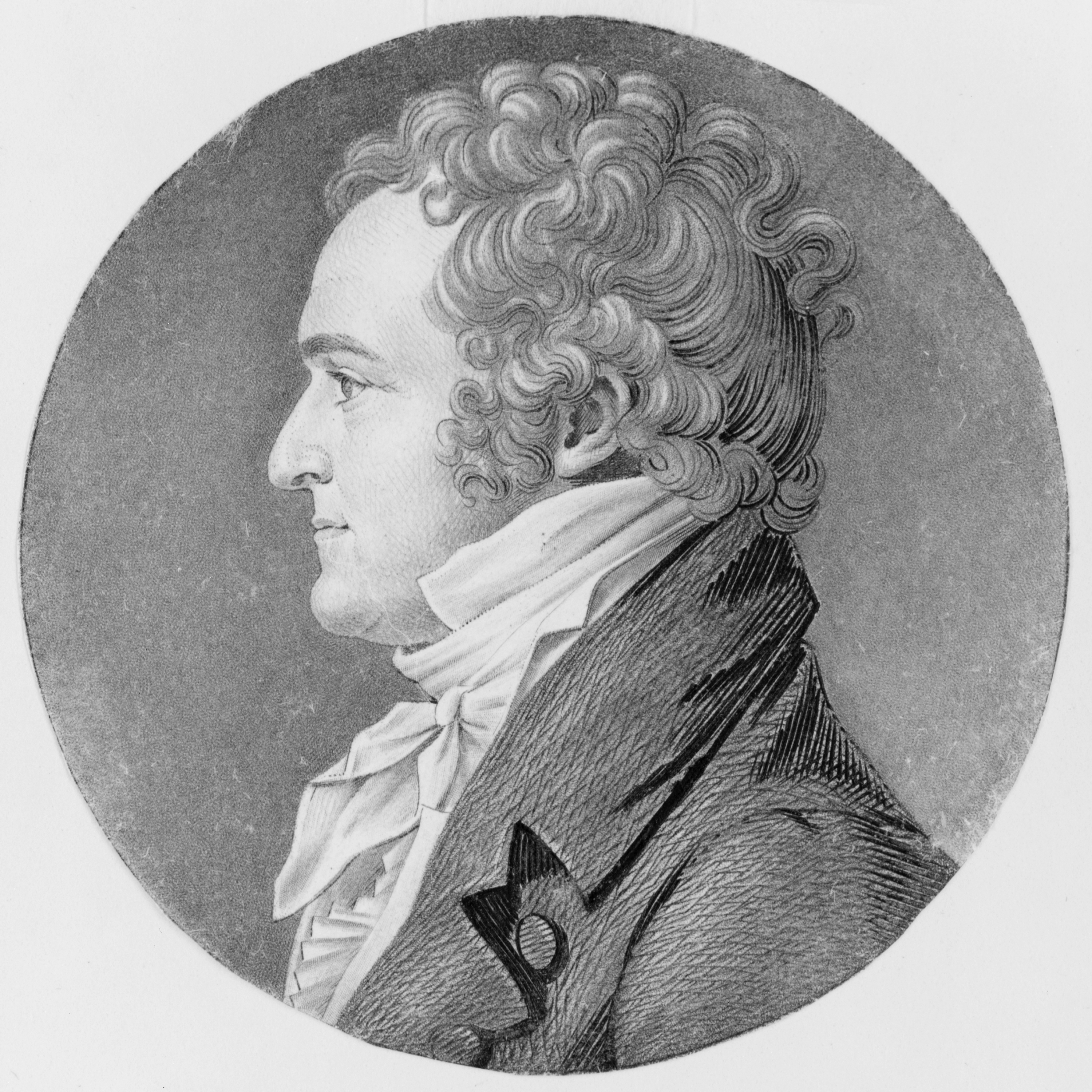
William Wirt. Engraving, c. 1807 (Library of Congress)
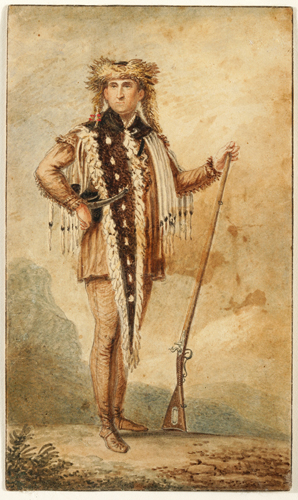
Meriwether Lewis (1774–1809) in Frontiersman's Regalia, 1806–1807 (New-York Historical Society)

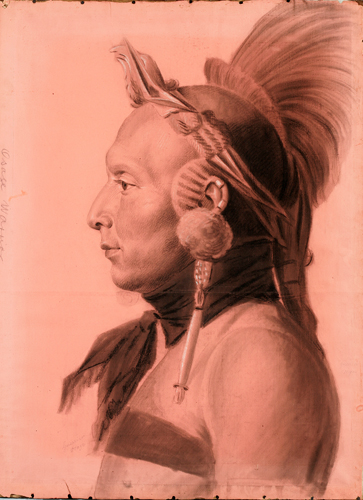
Unidentified Osage Warrior Wearing Bird Headdress, 1807 (New-York Historical Society)

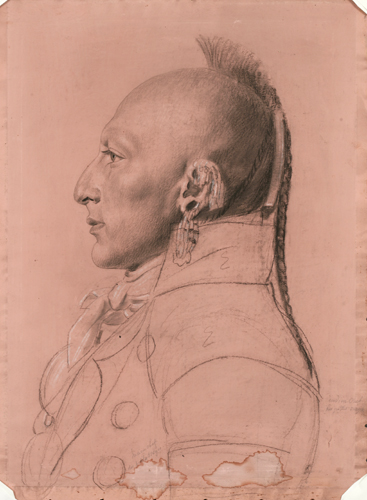
Unidentified Chief of the Little Osage, 1804 (New-York Historical Society)

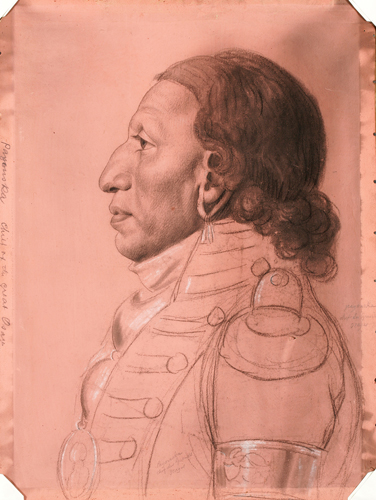
Payouska (Pawhuska, c. 1752–1832), Chief of the Great Osage, 1804 (New-York Historical Society)

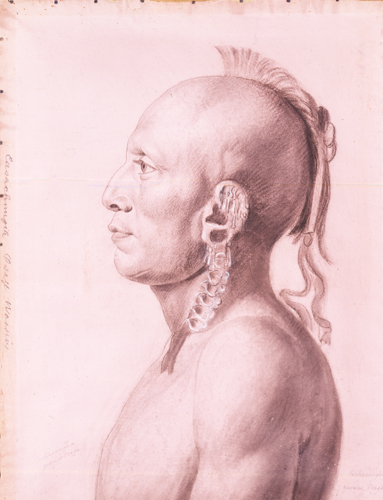
Cachasunghia, Osage Warrior, c. 1804–06 (New-York Historical Society)

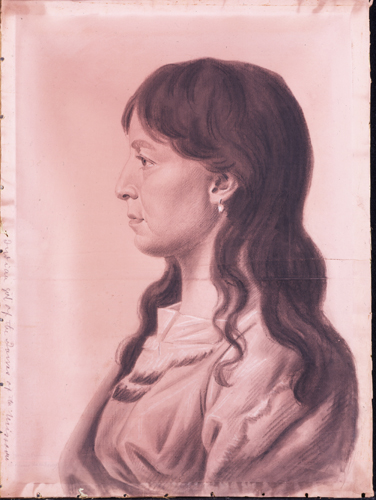
Yellow Corn, a Mandan, 1806–07 (New-York Historical Society)

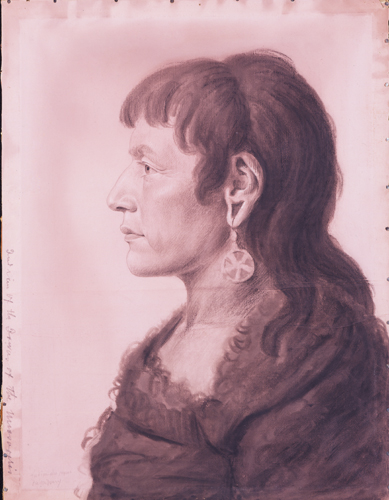
Shahaka (Sheheke or Big White c. 1766–1812), Chief of the Mandans, 1806–07 (New-York Historical Society)

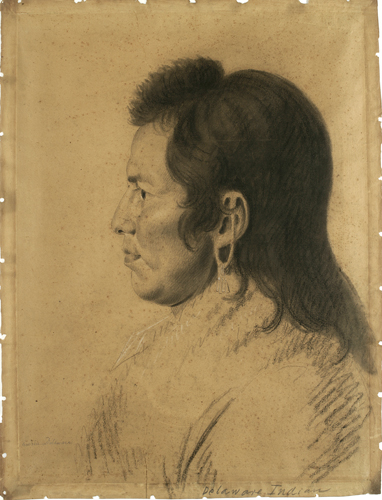
Unidentified Male Delaware, possibly Montgomery Montour, 1806–07 (New-York Historical Society)

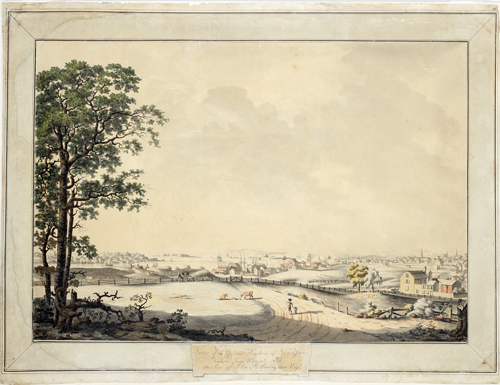
View of the City and Harbor of New York taken from Mt. Pitt, The Seat of John R. Livingston, Esq., 1794–96, etching (New-York Historical Society)
