= Timour the Tartar =

Play by Matthew Lewis

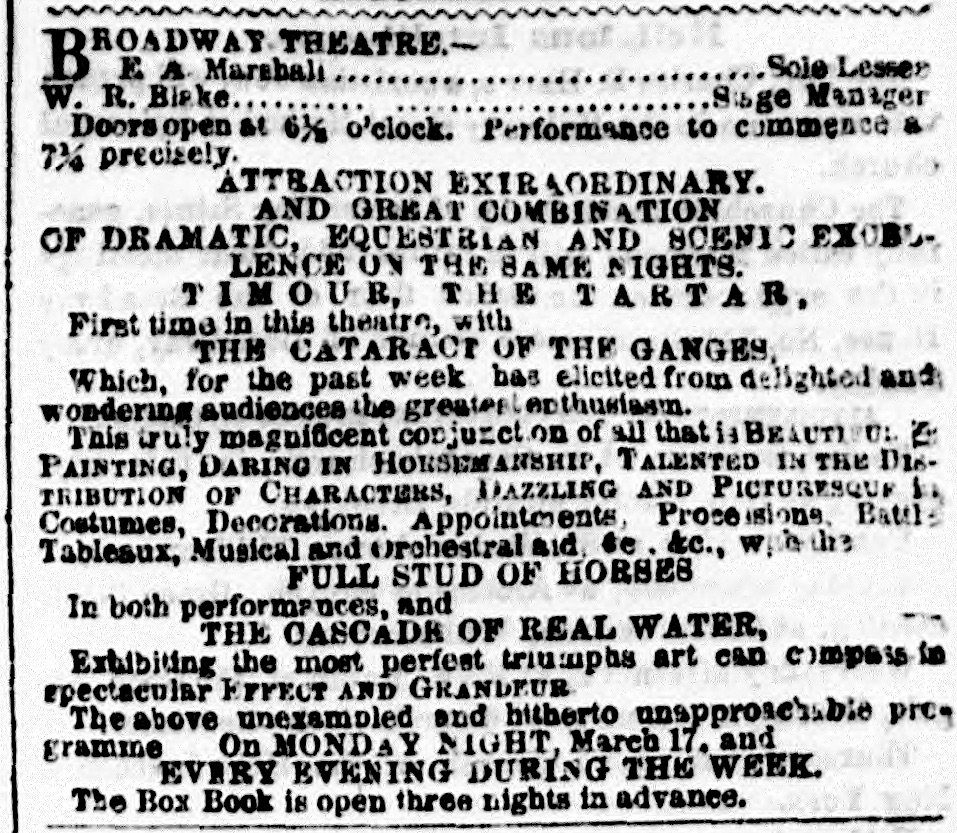
1856 advertisement for New York performance

Timour the Tartar is an 1811 hippodrama play by English dramatist Matthew Lewis. The equestrian drama was a popular success.

Due to the success of a new equestrian version of Blue Beard (a play by George Colman the Younger) in February 1811, the managers of Covent Garden hired Matthew Lewis (nicknamed "Monk" Lewis because of his successful 1796 novel, The Monk) to specifically author an equestrian play, believed to be the first play expressly written to features horses. It debuted on either April 29 or May 1, 1811.

Though successful with audiences, its debut was the subject of some controversy. Some were worried it was preying on the success of smaller "non-legitimate" theatres which featured horses, and others lamented the reliance on horses to make a hit. But its success showed that this new combination of circus amusement and traditional theatre was clearly not going away.

In the United States, the play debuted at the Anthony Street Theatre in New York (called the "Olympic" at the time, and also a circus venue) in September 1812. Mr. Robertson played Timour and Mrs. Twaits played Zorilda. The play then went to the Park Theatre.

The play was performed often in both England and America for the next fifty years.

== Original cast (Covent Garden) ==
- Charles Farley as Timour
- Mast. Chapman as Agib
- Mr. Treby as Bermeddia
- Mr. King as Abdalee
- Mr. Crossman as Kerim
- Mr. Makeen as Sanballat
- Mr. Field as Orasmin
- John Fawcett as Oglou
- Nannette Parker Johnston ("Mrs. H. Johnston") as Zorilda
- Miss Bolton as Selima
- Mrs. Liston and Miss Feron as Liska
