= Henry John Wallack =

British actor

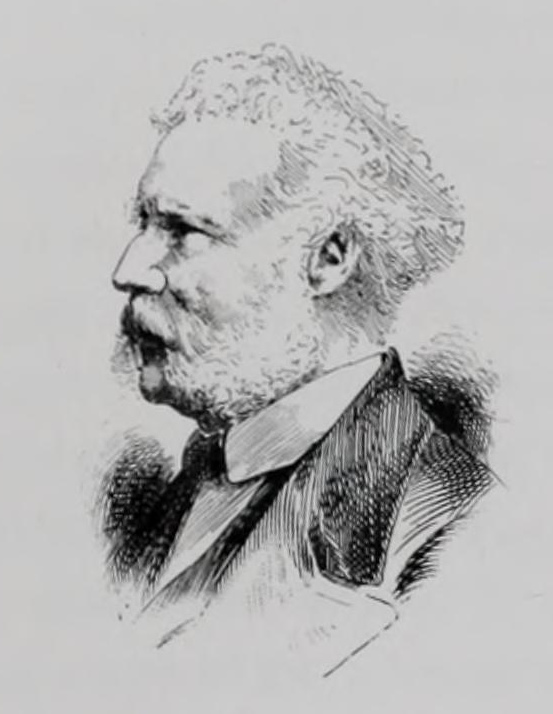
Henry John Wallack

Henry John Wallack (1790 – 30 August 1870) was a British actor, stage manager, and brother of actor James William Wallack.

Wallack was born in London. Wallack's parents were comedians, who performed at the London minor playhouses and in the British provinces.

He worked in the United States, making his debut at the Anthony Street Theatre on 9 May 1821. In America he was received as Hamlet, Sir Peter Teazle, Sir Anthony Absolute, and many other parts.

He appeared at Drury Lane on 26 October 1829 as Julius Caesar to his brother's Mark Antony. Subsequently, he was stage-manager at Covent Garden. He played the title role in Sheridan's Pizarro, Lord Lovell in A New Way to pay Old Debts, O'Donnell in Henri Quatre, Buckingham in Henry VIII, and other parts, and was on 28 November 1829 the first Major O'Simper in Follies of Fashion, by the Earl of Glengall.

== Family ==
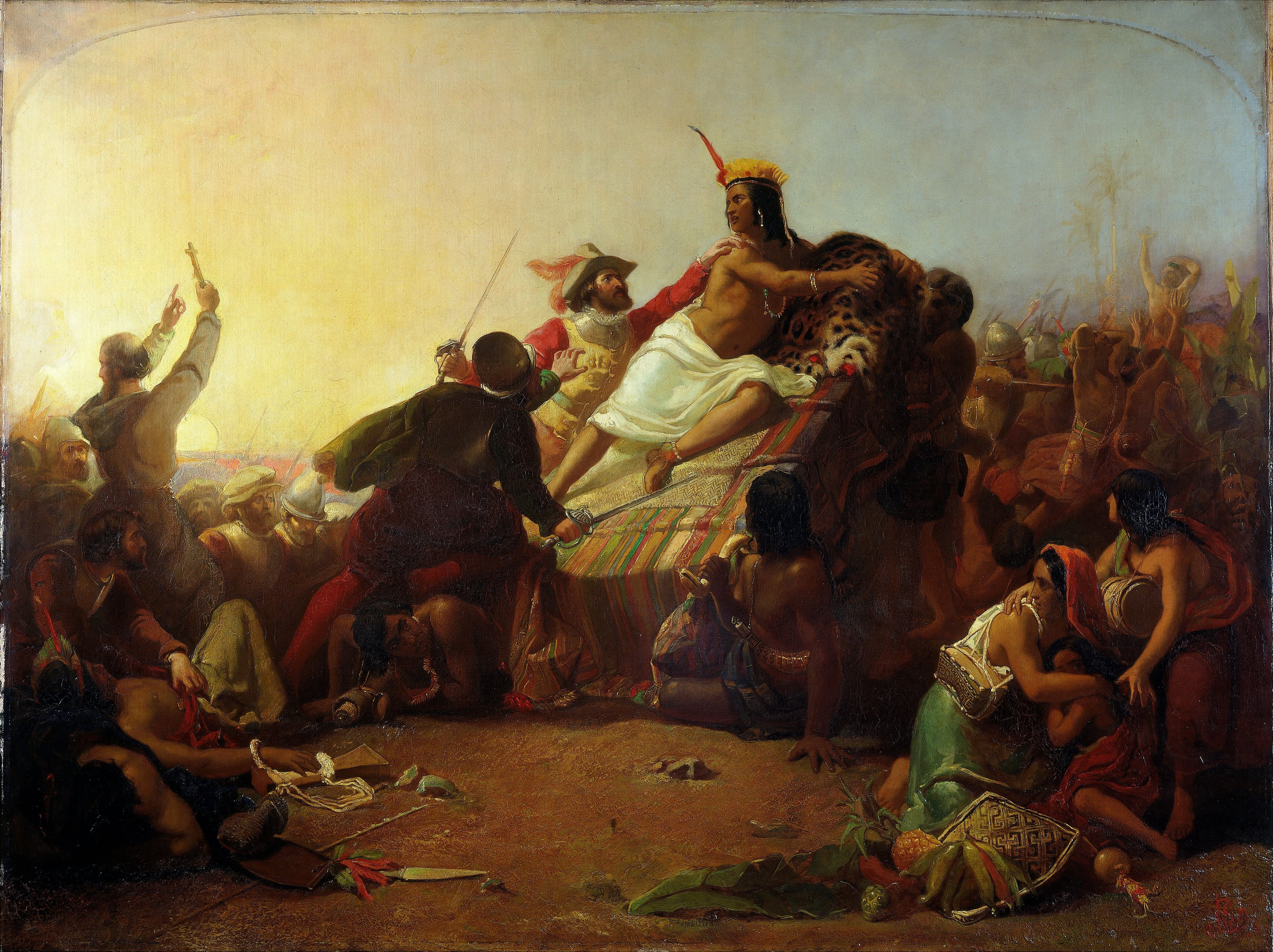
Pizarro Seizing the Inca of Peru by John Everett Millais. Millais modelled the look of Pizarro on Wallack who had played him numerous times on stage.

He married 1. Frances (aka Fanny) Jones (divorced 1833) and 2. Miss Maria Turpin, an actress at the Haymarket Theatre.

He and Frances, an actress, had a son James and two daughters, Julia Wallack, a vocalist, and Fanny Wallack, an actress. Julia, stage name Julia Harland, married the actor William Hoskins in England on 24 August 1842 and moved to Melbourne, Australia, where she died on 19 August 1872. He and Maria, a vocalist, had children, sons George, William Henry James and Augustus Charles. Henry Wallack died in New York City on 30 August 1870.
