= Peter Grain (artist) =

French-American artist

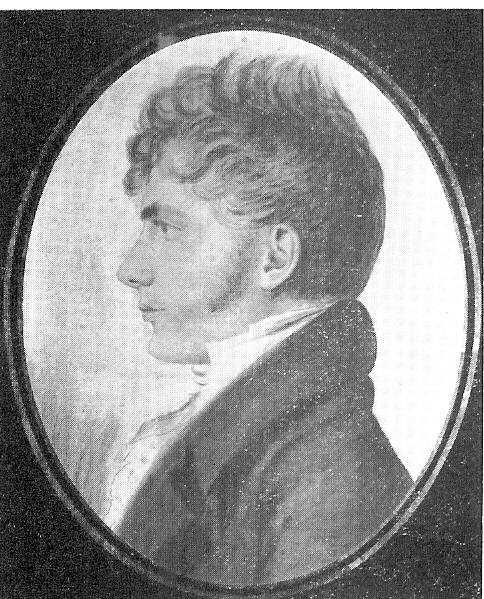
Pierre Michel Grain by Charles Balthazar Julien Févret de Saint-Mémin

Peter Grain (c. 1785 – 1857) was a French-American artist who achieved success in the United States. Known for his panoramas, landscapes, portraits, dioramas, portrait miniatures, and theatrical designs, he was also an architect and the author of at least one stage play. His family was involved in theatrical design in New York, Philadelphia and other major American cities for at least two generations.

== Early life ==
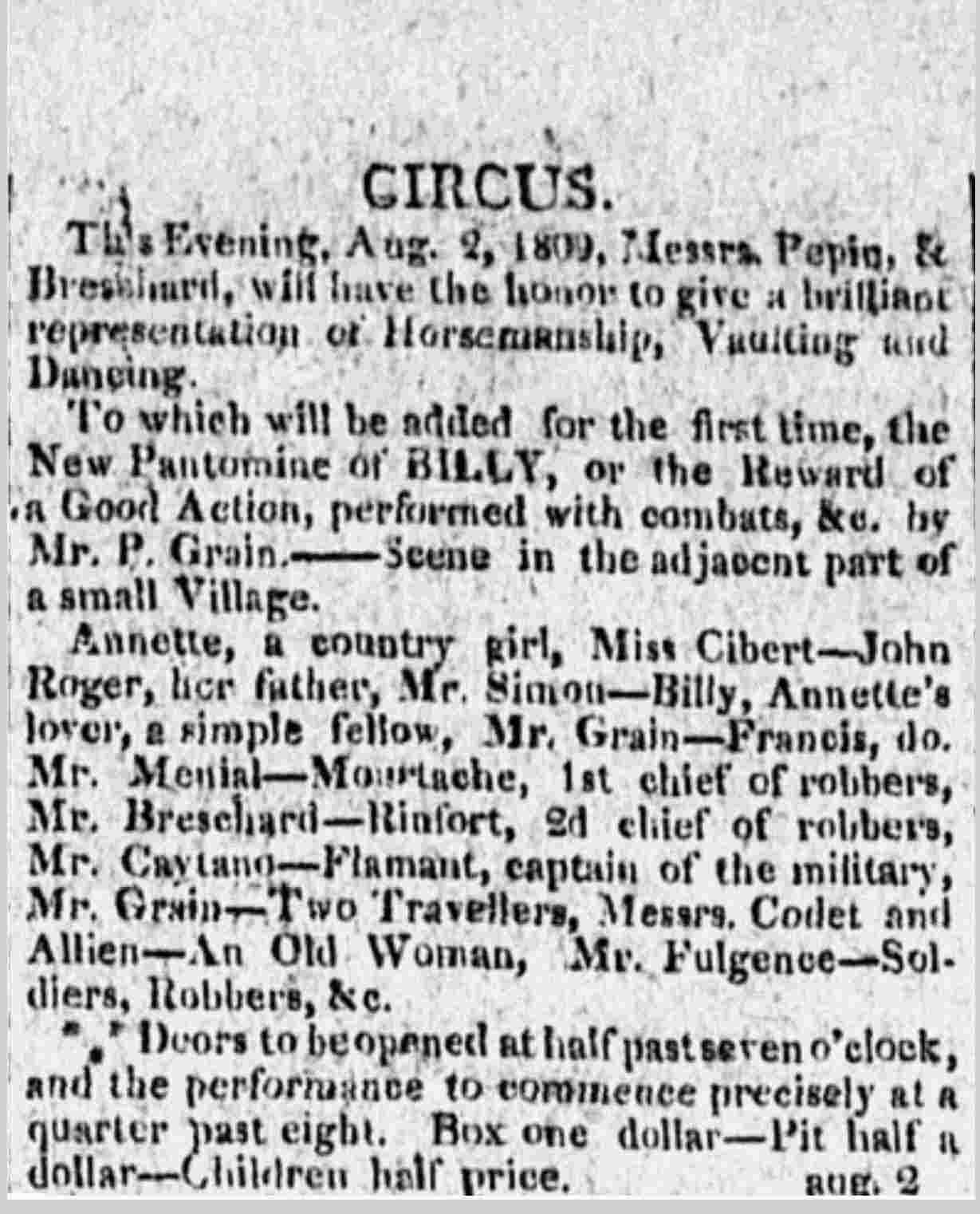
A Pépin and Breschard advertisement in 1809

Born in France, Grain was originally a performer and playwright with the Circus of Pépin and Breschard, a company which toured the United States from 1807 until 1815. On August 2, 1809, Pépin and Breschard presented his play Billy, or the Reward of a Good Action in New York City. This "New Pantomime" included "combats" on horseback, making it an early example of hippodrama. Grain was cast as the title character. His billing as "Mr. Grain" can be seen in other advertisements for the company's 1809 season.

== Painting ==
Grain's earliest recognition as a painter occurred in Maryland in 1815, where he created a setting for The Hero of the North; or, The Deliverer of His Country performed by an amateur company in Washington, D.C. The setting included the Star Spangled Banner and portrayed Fort McHenry and the "Victory of Lake Champlain." He advertised himself as a "drawing master" in Richmond, Virginia in 1822.

In 1823 Grain's Picture of the Shipwreck of the Packet Albion, portraying the loss of the New York and Liverpool Line Ship Albion, on the Coast of Ireland in April, 1822, on 120 feet of canvas, was viewed by the public in Charleston, South Carolina He was employed by Henry Hanington, dioramist (panorama painter), in 1836. The Grain name was used as the principal painter in Charles Kean's revivals of Shakespeare's Richard III (1845), and The Life and Death of King John (1846). During 1849 Grain exhibited the Grand Panorama of Scotts Battles in Mexico, commemorating the 1847 Mexican–American War exploits of General Winfield Scott.

Panorama of the Hudson and James Rivers: Scenes in Virginia, painted in oil and watercolor, was exhibited at the San Francisco Hall in San Francisco in March 1853. A moving panorama, it covered 9,400 feet of canvas. Scenes included "A View at Sea, 20 miles below Sandy Hook; New York City and Harbor; West Point by Moonlight; a fine view of the Catskill Mountains; the City of Albany; Scenes in Virginia; the Great Natural Bridge; Scenes on James River and Kanawha Canal", and "portraying to the eye and imagination of the visitor views over an extent of 5,000 miles". This panorama had previously been shown in most major cities of the United States, including Charleston in 1850. While on its national tour, the moving panorama made a stop in Ann Arbor, Michigan, where "an astonished village looked at it for twenty-five cents a head."

At the present time View of New York from Jersey City (with Windmill), 1835, an oil painting, is in the collection of the Museum of the City of New York. Grain is mentioned in the National Gallery of Art provenance of a portrait by Gilbert Stuart, The Circus Rider. He is listed as owning the painting in the mid-19th century. The identification of the sitter in the portrait is disputed.

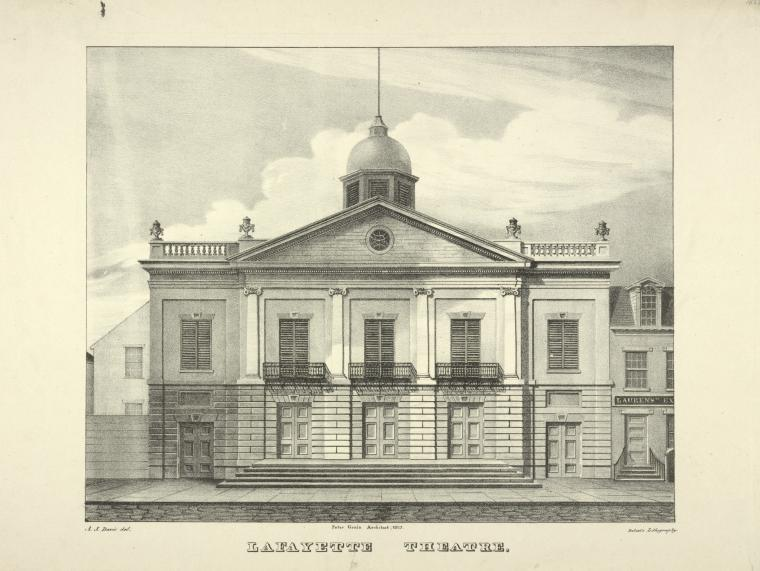
Lafayette Theatre

== Architectural work ==
The Lafayette Theatre in New York City (originally the Lafayette Circus) was redesigned by Grain in 1827. The circus ring was replaced and an inclined plane was added to give it a rake similar to modern theatres. At the time it was the largest theatre in both the United States and the United Kingdom.

== Family of artists ==
Three of Grain's sons also became artists: Peter Grain, Jr., George, and Urban A. Grain.

Peter Grain, his brother Frederick (a noted panorama painter), and Peter Grain Jr. all worked as scenographers for numerous theatres. Peter Jr. was based at the Walnut Street Theatre in Philadelphia, built by the Circus of Pépin and Breschard in 1809 for most of his career.

Catalogs from the Philadelphia scenic studio, scenic supply and rental concern established by the family are still in existence.

Theatres associated with the Grain family are; the Charleston Theatre, Charleston, SC; the Chatham Garden Theatre in New York City; the Park Theatre (Manhattan, New York); the Chestnut Street Theatre and the Arch Street Theatre in Philadelphia; Welch's Olympic Circus; Niblo's Garden; the Bowery Theatre; and others.

One contemporary critic described the family as being among the best artists in the country.
