= Jean Baptiste Casmiere Breschard =

Circus owner and equestrian

Jean Baptiste Casmiere Breschard (John B. Breschard) was a circus owner and equestrian performer in the Circus of Pepin and Breschard.

Along with his partner, Victor Pepin he had been managing a circus in Madrid, Spain. Pepin and Breschard were encouraged by the Spanish consul to Philadelphia, Don Luis de Onis, to relocate to the United States and build amphitheaters there, in the manner of John Bill Ricketts, who had previously run a circus amphitheater on Broad Street in Philadelphia. Pepin and Breschard traveled to America in 1807, and performed in Boston and New York before opening in Philadelphia on 2 February 1809.

According to the book "America's Longest Run: A History of the Walnut Street Theatre" by Andrew Davis, Breschard specialized in what is called "Roman Standing" riding – balancing on the back of two horses. He also doubled as the comedian of the troupe.

Charles Durang, in his history "Philadelphia Stage", stated that "Breschard was a model of a performer. He looked like a genteel comedian attired for a polished drawing-room. He was truly a picture, when dressed in his superb Spanish-lace uniform, white cassimere small-clothes, silk stockings, neat pumps and gold shoe buckles, going through his exercise on two horses."

Mme. Breschard, wife of Jean Baptiste, was a premier equestrienne and is described in numerous sources as being one of the early businesswomen in the United States. Mme. Breschard is arguably the first nationally recognized professional sportswoman in the United States. Both are documented as performing in the United States between 1807 and 1817. Breschard is reported as performing in Puerto Rico; Havana, Cuba; and Haiti in 1820.

Breschard was a native of France, but his exact place and date of birth and death are unknown.

== Gilbert Stuart portrait ==
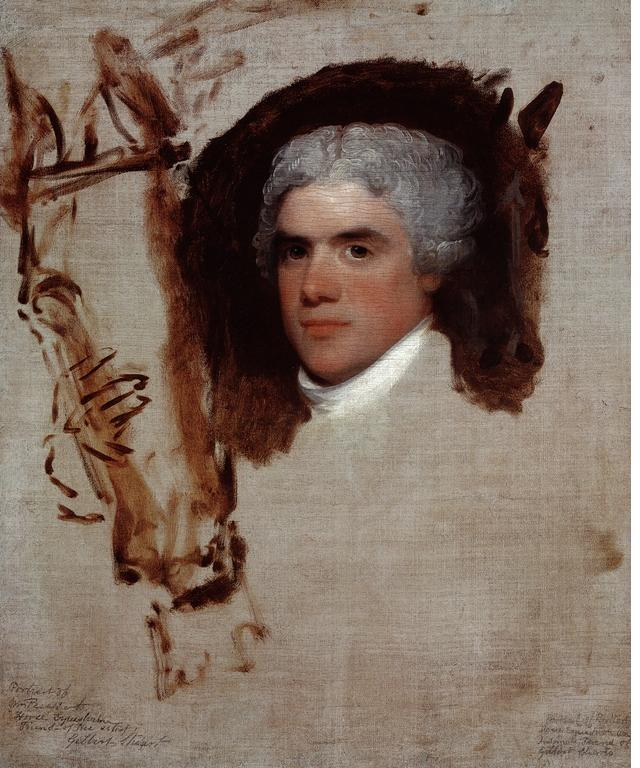
Gilbert Stuart, John Bill Ricketts, National Gallery of Art, 1795–1799. The painting was previously identified as a portrait of Breschard, the Circus Rider

In 1878 a portrait by Gilbert Stuart was identified by George Washington Riggs, (also known as "The President's Banker"), a trustee of the Corcoran Gallery of Art in Washington, D.C., as "Breschard, the Circus Rider", and as "Breschard" the painting was displayed at the Museum of Fine Arts, Boston in 1880. The portrait currently resides at the National Gallery of Art in Washington, D.C., but is now identified by the NGA as being John Bill Ricketts, another circus performer.

Stuart and Ricketts did not sail from Dublin to Philadelphia together as some have claimed. Owing to Stuart's aversion to being cooped up for weeks with a circus, he booked passage on another ship, the Draper, even though its destination was a different American port.

Peter Grain, a former member of the Circus of Pépin and Breschard, is cited in the NGA provenance for this painting as being the owner in the mid-19th century. After Grain, the portrait was owned by picture dealer Henry Barlow, who sold it to Riggs sometime before 1867. In that year, Henry T. Tuckerman's Book of the Artists: American Artist Life Comprising Biographical and Critical Sketches of American Arts listed the painting, sitter unidentified, as being in Riggs' collection. In 1944 it was displayed at the Virginia Museum of Fine Arts, Richmond, as "William Rickhart", and by 1947 the National Gallery of Art had changed the identification to "John Bill Ricketts".

== Breschard and Haiti ==
In 1819, Jean Baptiste Breschard was invited to perform for the 17th Anniversary of the Haitian Independence. On the night of 1 December 1819, while performing for the president of Haiti (Jean-Pierre Boyer) and the Haitian people at the Cirque Olympique, a fire broke out during his performance and ended the event that night. Breschard left Haiti on 22 January 1820 after a month performing for the Haitian people for the 17th the Anniversary of the Haitian Independence.
