= Circus of Pepin and Breschard =

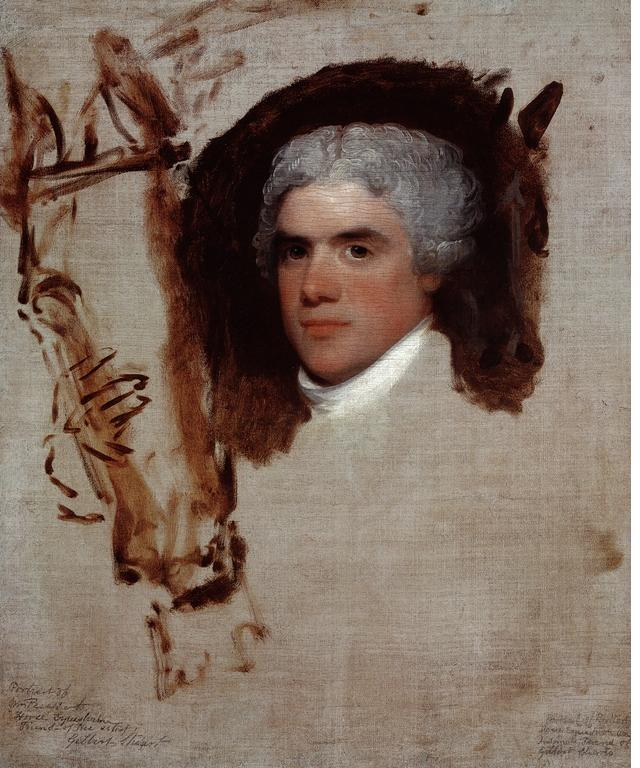
John Bill Ricketts, earliest identification, Breschard, the Circus Rider, by Gilbert Stuart

The equestrian theatre company of Pépin and Breschard, American Victor Pépin and Frenchman Jean Baptiste Casmiere Breschard, arrived in the United States from Madrid, Spain (where they had performed during the 1805 and 1806 seasons), in November 1807. They toured that new country until 1815. From their arrival until the present day, what is now known as the traditional circus has had a presence in North America.

Invited to perform in the United States by Spanish Ambassador Luis de Onís, the company landed in Plymouth, Massachusetts, from Spain. They performed their first season in Charlestown, Massachusetts, after being refused a permit to perform in neighboring Boston.

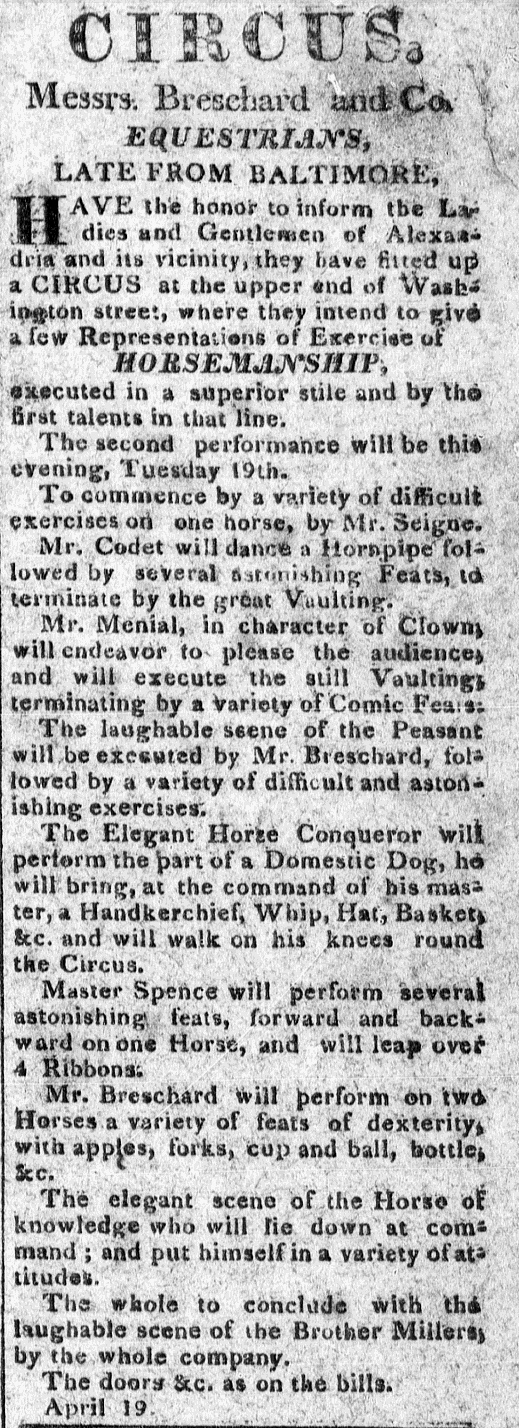
Advertisement for Breschard and Co. - Alexandria, Virginia - 1814

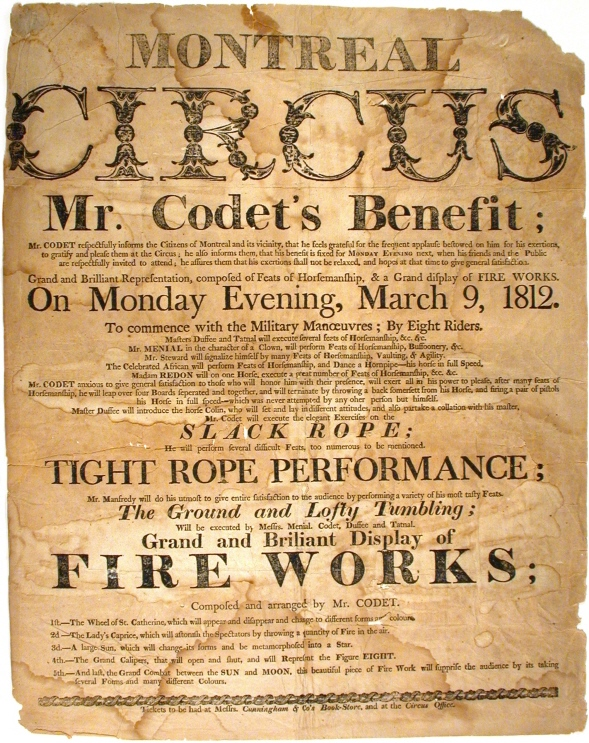
Montreal Circus, Mr. Codet's Benefit. One of Pépin and Breschard's Companies. 1812.

In the following years Pépin and Breschard's troupes built circus theatres in cities across the United States, including New York, New York; New Orleans; Charlestown, Massachusetts; Baltimore, Maryland; Richmond, Virginia; Alexandria, Virginia; Charleston, South Carolina; Pittsburgh and Philadelphia, Pennsylvania. They also built a theatre in Lower Canada in Montreal. The oldest continuously operating theatre in the English-speaking world and the oldest theatre in the United States, the Walnut Street Theatre in Philadelphia was built by Pépin and Breschard in 1809.

During the early 19th century, the word "circus" was used primarily to indicate the equestrian theatre building itself.

Pépin and Breschard introduced at least one Shakespearean play to the US and were one of the first, if not the first, companies in America to perform hippodrama. They were the first to bring a circus west of the Appalachian Mountains to such frontier cities as Pittsburgh, where Benjamin Latrobe, a designer of the United States Capitol, was the architect for a circus he built for them in 1814.

An early member of the company, Peter Grain, later achieved a degree of fame as a painter and dioramist.

Pépin and Breschard are referenced in the United States Congressional Record of 1810.

Pépin, born in what is now New York State, was the first American to own and operate a circus in his native country. The theatrical company of Pépin and Breschard thus can be considered the first American circus.
