= Victor Pépin =

American circus performer and owner

Victor Adolphus Pépin (March 8, 1780 – 1845) was an American circus performer and circus owner most famous for being a partner in the Circus of Pépin and Breschard. The Circus of Pépin and Breschard can be considered the first American circus and Pépin the first American circus impresario.

== Biography ==
Victor Adolphus Pépin, the eldest son of André Pepin, a Canadian who fought for the Americans in their Revolution against the British, was born in Albany, New York.

Victor was taken by his father to France in 1793 and returned to the United States with Jean Breschard in 1807.

Pépin was the probable cause of a riot centered on his circus in Pittsburgh in 1824.

In 1833, he was a member of John Charles Beales's Rio Grande Colony which helped colonize Texas.

Victor Pépin was a participant in the circus business from at least 1805 until 1831. He died in 1845 and is buried at New Albany, Indiana in an unmarked grave at Fairview Cemetery.
