= Hippodrama =

Type of theatrical show

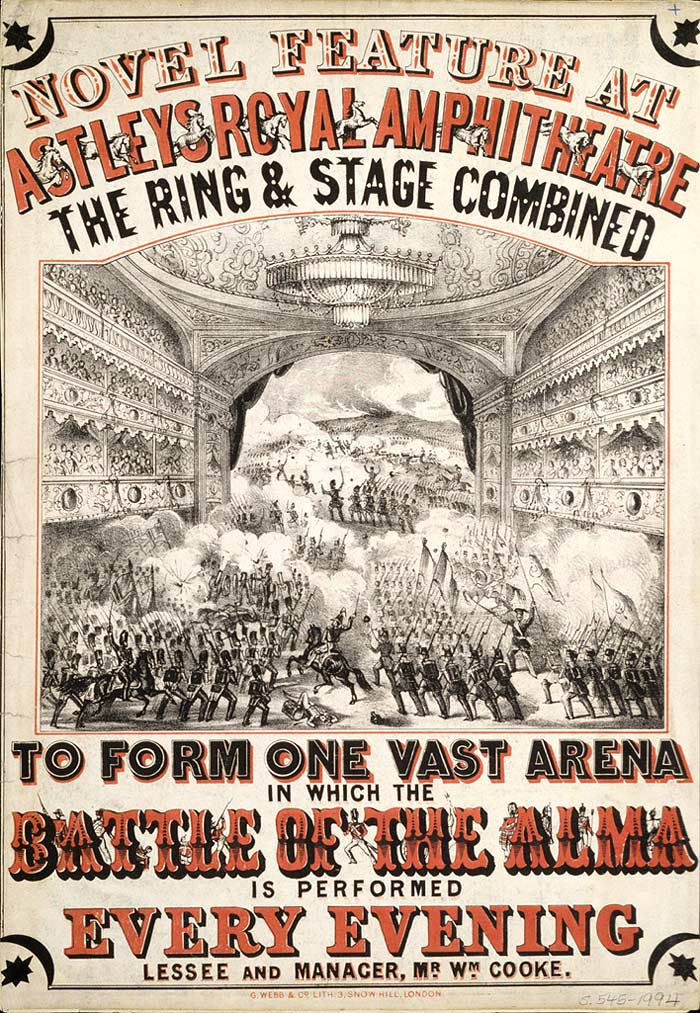
1854 advertisement for the reenactment of the Battle of the Alma at Astley's Amphitheatre in London

Hippodrama, horse drama, or equestrian drama is a genre of theatrical show blending circus horsemanship display with popular melodrama theatre.

== Definition ==
Kimberly Poppiti defines hippodrama as "plays written or performed to include a live horse or horses enacting significant action or characters as a necessary part of the plot". Arthur Saxon defines the form similarly, as "literally a play in which trained horses are considered as actors, with business, often leading actions, of their own to perform".

Evolving from earlier equestrian circus, pioneered by equestrians including, most famously, Philip Astley in the 1760s, it relied on drama plays written specifically for the genre; trained horses were considered actors along with humans and were even awarded leading roles. A more negative assessment came from Anthony Hippisley-Coxe, who described hippodrama as "a bastard entertainment born of a misalliance between the circus and the theatre ... that actually inhibited the development of the circus".

== History ==
Horses appeared in Western European theater in the second half of the 18th century, both on stage and in aerial stunts (flying Pegasus). Hippodrama emerged at the turn of the 19th century in England, introduced by Philip Astley in outdoor settings. At this time, the Licensing Act 1737 was in effect, which allowed only three venues to perform "legitimate theater" (patent theatre). These included Covent Garden, Drury Lane, and the summer theatre in the Haymarket. These theaters had patents on real drama. Other theaters, such as Astley's Amphitheatre and the Royal Circus and Equestrian Philharmonic Academy (latterly the Surrey Theatre), were only granted licenses for "public dancing and music" and "for other public entertainments of the like kind". Astley's horse acts in his circus were allowed within his license. However, Astley wanted to produce shows more like "legitimate theater".

He soon realized that he could produce real drama as long as the action was performed on horseback, giving rise to hippodrama. He adapted common stories and plays in a way where they could be performed on horses. Not only that, but the horses were the main actors. The horses had their own business, or leading actions, to perform that helped carry out the plot. Also at this time, gradual closing of country fairs and discharge of cavalrymen and grooms after the end of the Continental Wars provided both experienced staff and public interest to the new show.

Early hippodrama were presented in London at Astley's Amphitheatre, Royal Circus and Olympic Pavilion; and in Paris at Cirque Olympique, where 36 horse riders could perform simultaneously. Theatres built for hippodramas combined proscenium stage with a dirt-floored riding arena separated by orchestra pit; scene and arena were connected by ramps, forming a single performing space. Signor Manfredi presented the first equestrian drama in the United States with his production of "La Fille Hussard" during the 1802–1803 season in New York at the Park Theatre. The Circus of Pepin and Breschard presented an adaptation of Don Quixote de la Mancha "on horseback and on foot, with combats" in New York City on August 12, 1809. Pepin and Breschard's company presented hippodramas in the United States from at least 1809 until 1815. Christoph de Bach produced similar entertainment in Vienna. Astley's 1810 financial success with The Blood Red Knight may have influenced the decision of reluctant management of Covent Garden and Drury Lane theatres to join the lucrative business. The first hippodrama on the legitimate stage of London was an equestrianized production of "Blue Beard" at Covent Garden in February 1811.

The same stage later that season saw the debut of the first play written specifically to include horses, Timour the Tartar, which premiering at New York's Olympic Theatre the following year. Hippodrama plays, tailored for the masses, revolved around colourful Eastern subjects (Timur/Tamerlane, the conqueror of Central Asia, or the Ukrainian military leader Mazepa) and the European military past (Marlborough's Heroic Deeds). Mazeppa, or the Wild Horse of Tartary, first staged in England in 1823, became a hit of Astley's Amphitheatre in 1831 and was performed by travelling companies in the United States from 1833; in the 1860s it became a trademark show for Adah Isaacs Menken. Adaptations of William Shakespeare (Richard III) were another common choice. Highwaymen real and fictional proved figures to hang stores on: Dick Turpin's Ride to York and Paul Clifford

Equestrian drama became popular in the United States, as well as in England and France, and the Lafayette Circus in New York City, inaugurated in 1825, was the first American theatre building specifically designed for hippodrama, followed by the Philadelphia Amphitheater and the Baltimore Roman Amphitheatre. Hippodrama shows attracted working class audiences that included labourers and seamen, "ready to riot at the slightest provocations"; "in fact, much of recorded rowdyism of the mid-1820s in New York City took place at Lafayette Circus.

Hippodrama traveled all the way to Australia. Hippodromes were built in Sydney and Melbourne in the 1850s. "The year 1854 was also the year in which the Crimean War began, so Lewis's mention of the military value of sport and drama was a pointed one; hippodramas by implication assisted in encouraging men to keep themselves fit and trained in military skills such as horse-riding" (Fotheringham 12). However, hippodrama was not as big in Australia as it was in England. It did leave an impact, though. Hippodrama helped change Australian theater building designs. There had to be a way for the horses to get onstage, so the theaters started to build ramps leading up to the stage. Also, the stages had to be big enough to hold a circus ring. From then on, the stages were built bigger.

The Equestrian Circus in Saint Petersburg, Russia was built by Alberto Cavos in 1847.

The American Hengler's Circus prospered in the 1850s under the heading of Hengler's Colossal Hippodrama, but elsewhere popularity of the genre faded by the middle of the century. It was revived in France under Napoleon III, especially with the 1863 production of the Battle of Marengo and in 1880 Michel Strogoff. The United States saw a brief revival of the genre in the late 1880s and 1890s, helped by the invention of specially designed stage machinery built for the production of equestrian dramas that included movement by horses on stage that could range from simple horse and buggy rides, to displays of circus equestrianism, to (most notably) onstage horse races.

The 1899 hippodrama Ben-Hur was notable for its elaborate use of spectacle, including horses running inside elaborately constructed cradles to create the optical illusion of the famous chariot race. The stage production opened at the Broadway Theater in New York City, became a hit Broadway show, and travelled the United States for 21 years. (Versions also reached Great Britain and Australia.) By the end of its run in April 1920, the play had been seen by more than twenty million people and earned over $10 million at the box office. The key spectacle of the 1899 show recreated the novel's chariot race with live horses and real chariots running on treadmills against a rotating backdrop. When the novel's author Lew Wallace saw the elaborate stage sets, he exclaimed, "My God. Did I set all of this in motion?"

Film, introduced at the turn of the 20th century, finally replaced hippodrama as the show for the masses.

== In modern times ==
In recent times, the Cavalia circus/show/production company (and other similar companies) have produced a well-received modern form that can be considered hippodrama, which tours internationally, using as many as 30 horses per show and playing for up to two thousand people at a time.

A modern one-of-a-kind hippodrama directed by Franz Abraham, an equestrian reenactment of Ben Hur, took place at the O2 arena, London on September 15, 2009. The show employed one hundred animals (including thirty-two horses) and four hundred people.
