= Orchestra pit =

Area in a theatre where musicians perform

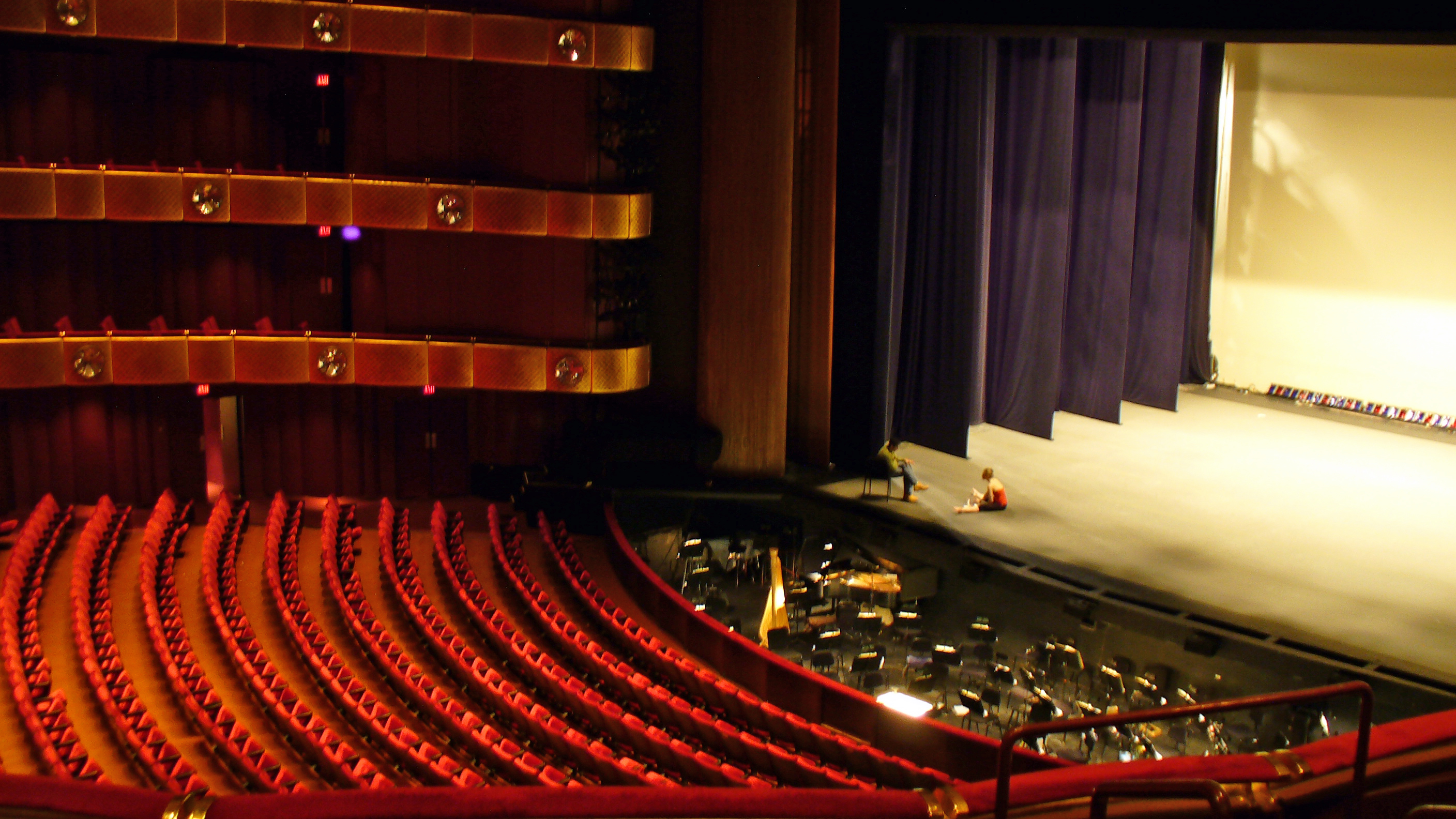
Orchestra pit sandwiched between the stage and the seats at the David H. Koch Theater

An orchestra pit is an area in a theatre (usually located in a lowered area in front of the stage) in which musicians perform. The orchestra plays mostly out of sight in the pit, rather than on the stage as for a concert, when providing music for forms of theatre that require it (such as opera and ballet) or when incidental music is required. The conductor or director typically stands at the front of the orchestra pit facing the stage.

== Construction ==
In an orchestra pit, the walls are specially designed to provide good acoustics, ensuring that the sound of the orchestra flows through the entire venue without overwhelming the performance on stage. Many orchestra pits are also designed to feed back reasonably low decibel levels, allowing musicians to work without fears of hearing damage. Typically, a small platform in the pit accommodates the conductor, so that they can be seen by all of the musicians, who may be seated on chairs or on bleachers.

A lift mechanism for the pit can usually be lowered all the way to a storage space under the stage, or halfway to floor level, or all the way up, level with the stage. When lowered all the way, the lift can be filled with equipment or props from underneath the stage and then raised and unloaded on stage. The pit can be raised so it is level with the floor of the audience seats to accommodate more seating. This is common when the stage is being used for a rock show and the pit area is wanted for standing room. When the pit is raised all the way up, level with the stage, it can be used as part of the stage to give more room for larger shows. A lift gives the theatre much more flexibility and ability to adapt to different events that it hosts.

An orchestra pit does not have to be located directly in front of the stage, either, although many patrons expect to see the orchestra performing in front of the stage; when an orchestra pit is elsewhere in the theatres, the conductor's movements may be broadcast on monitors visible from the stage, so that actors can follow cues.

== History ==
Early forms of the orchestra pit appear in 17th-century opera houses in Italy and France, where musicians were placed between the stage and the audience at more or less the same floor level.

== Uses ==
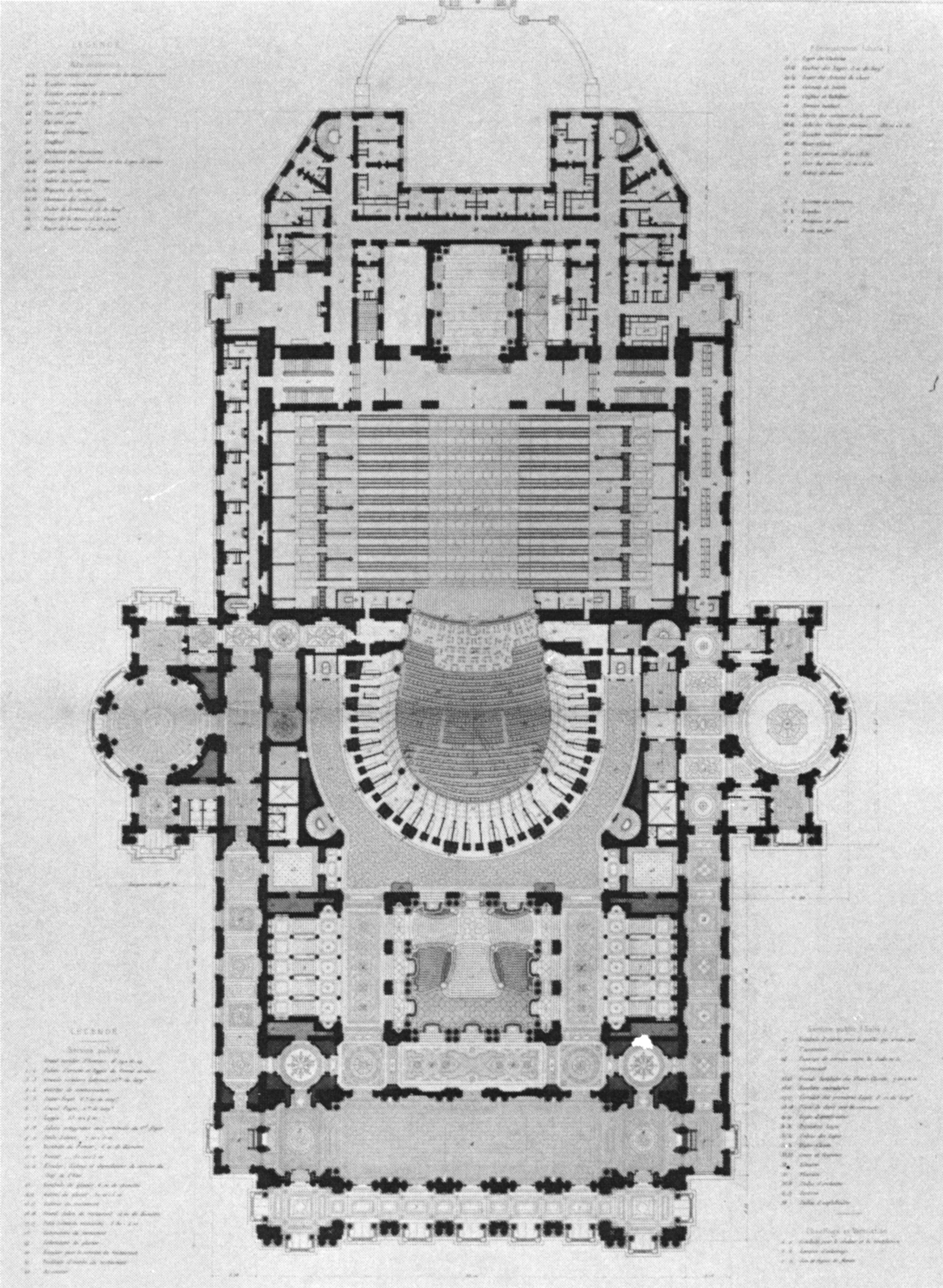
Palais Garnier orchestra pit plan

Sometimes, when an opera or musical is being performed in the theatre and there is a need for live music, the orchestra pit will be lowered all the way down and the musicians will play down in the pit in front of the stage. This way, the director of the orchestra is able to see what is happening on stage and has a better feel for when to start and stop the music. Sometimes, there may be precise cues that the director must give for certain sound effects, and it is crucial that they are done at the right time. Having the orchestra play in the pit creates the problem of a lack of space, and the sound quality can suffer as instruments bleed into other instruments' microphones when musicians are seated close together.

Before the 19th century, the conductor stood at the stage edge, facing the audience and orchestra, with their back towards the onstage performers, as shown in the Palais Garnier orchestra pit plan. During the late 19th century, the typical conductor location changed: now, the conductor stands in front of the first row of the audience, facing the orchestra and facing the performers onstage.

== See also ==
- Pit orchestra
- Benshi
