= Adonis (musical) =

- A Perversion of Common Sense
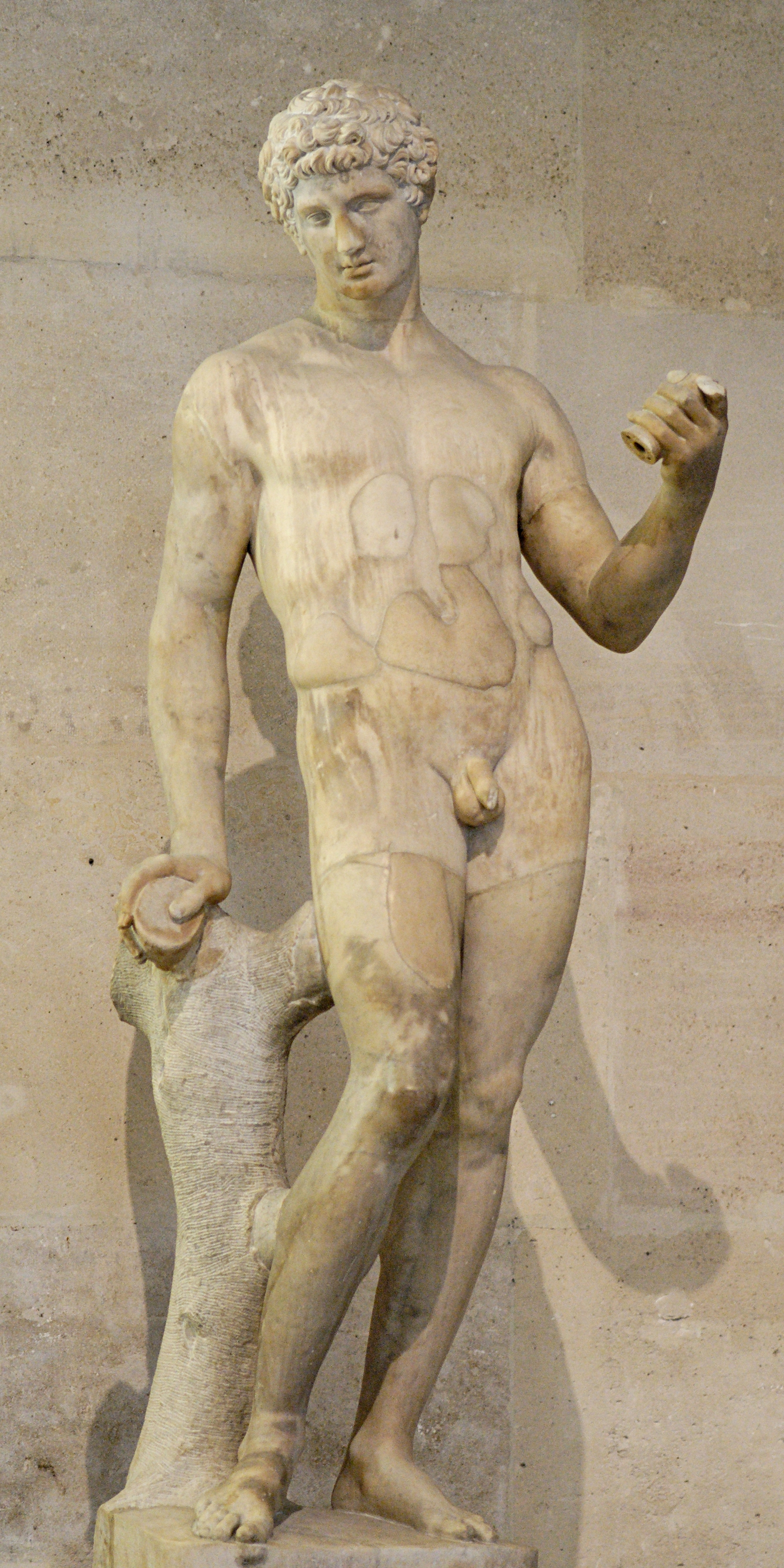
- Statue of Adonis by François Duquesnoy
- Music: John Eller; Edward Rice; Edmond Audran; Ludwig van Beethoven; David Braham; Joseph Haydn; Wolfgang Amadeus Mozart; Jacques Offenbach; Robert Planquette; Johann Strauss II; Arthur Sullivan; Franz von Suppé
- Lyrics: William Gill
- Book: William Gill
- Productions: 1884 Original Chicago production 1884 Broadway production 1886 West End production 1886 Broadway revival 1888 Broadway revival 1893 Broadway revival 1899 Broadway revival

Adonis is a musical burlesque in two acts with both book and lyrics by William Gill that is a spoof of the Pygmalion myth. Set in Greece, the musical tells the story of a gorgeous male statue of the mythological figure Adonis that comes to life and finds human ways so unpleasant that he chooses to turn back into stone – after spoofing several famous personalities. Originally envisioned as a starring vehicle for the actor Henry E. Dixey in the role of the Adonis, the play parodies the Pygmalion tale through a gender reversal in which the statue come-to-life is not female but male. In so doing the story is no longer one of the sexual objectification of a woman, but instead places a man as the embodied object of sexual desire.

In the tradition of a pastiche, the music for Adonis was largely derived from a variety of 19th century operetta composers; among them Edmond Audran, David Braham, Jacques Offenbach, Robert Planquette, Johann Strauss II, Arthur Sullivan, and Franz von Suppé. The work also used music by other classical music composers like Ludwig van Beethoven, Joseph Haydn, and Wolfgang Amadeus Mozart. Original lyrics by Gill were put to this musical material. Edward E. Rice and John Eller played a role in selecting and arranging this music by other composers, and they also both contributed some original music to the work. The work also included several vaudeville style entertainments which were envisioned, choreographed, and directed by Dixey. In addition to creating music for Adonis, Rice was the producer of the musical and Eller served as the show's music director for both the original 1884 Chicago production and the long-running Broadway production. James C. Scanlan was listed as the stage director of both the original Chicago and Broadway productions, and Dixey was also credited as director of the Broadway production.

Adonis was the longest running musical of the Gilded Age. Some writers on musical theatre history have described the work as "Broadway's first hit musical" because it was the first Broadway stage work, musical or otherwise, to surpass a performance count of 500 performances in a Broadway theatre. Other writers, however, have stated that The Black Crook (1866, premiere) deserves the distinction as the "first hit musical" because it was the first musical to have an extended run on Broadway. Adonis premiered in 1884 and was the first musical to surpass The Black Crook's performance record;breaking Broadway box-office records for profits, ticket sales, and performance longevity.

== Character list and descriptions ==
The original 1884 Chicago and Broadway programs for the play described the characters as such:

- Adonis, an accomplished young gentleman of undeniably good family, insomuch as he can trace his ancestry back through the Genozoic, Mesozoic, and Paleozoic period, until he finds it resting on the Archaean time. His family name, by the way, is 'Marble'.
- Marquis de Baccarat, a highly polished villain. It is well enough to describe his character, as no one would think it to look at him.
- Bunion Turke, father of Rosetta, an unblushing appropriator of the stock in trade of a well-known and worthy old histrionic miller.
- Talamea, a sculptor who, like most of her sex, is in love with her own creation.
- Artea, a Goddess, Patroness of the fine arts.
- Duchess of Area, aesthetic to the verge of eccentricity, rich to the verge of Millionairism, sentimental to the verge of gush.
- Lady Nattie, daughter of the Duchess. She and her sisters Hattie, Mattie, and Pattie are professional beauties.
- Lady Hattie, daughter of the Duchess. She and her sisters Nattie, Mattie, and Pattie are professional beauties.
- Lady Mattie, daughter of the Duchess. She and her sisters Nattie, Hattie, and Pattie are professional beauties.
- Lady Pattie, daughter of the Duchess. She and her sisters Nattie, Hattie, and Mattie are professional beauties.
- Rosetta, a simple village maiden, the happy possessor of a clear conscience and a strong will.
- Gyles, Nyles, Myles, & Byles, ordinary everyday rustics.
- Gills, Bills, Sills, & Tills, homely rustics (who will perform a circus).
- The Plumed Knights.

== Plot ==
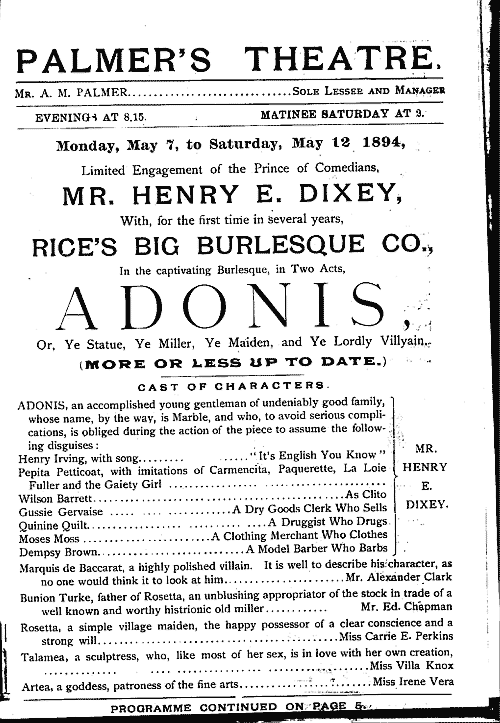
Programme from limited engagement 1894 reunion at Palmer's Theatre

Act 1, scene 1: Talamea's Studio in Athens

The sculptress Talamea has created a statue of a beautiful man called Adonis. The Duchess of Area and her four silly daughters, Nattie, Hattie, Mattie, and Pattie, visit Talamea's studio and admire her creation. The villain of the play, the Marquis de Baccarat, also arrives under the pretext of examining Talamea's creation, but with the intent of trying to seduce the duchess in order to obtain her money. The Duchess purchases the statue and leaves the studio with her daughters and the Marquis after being promised it will be delivered to her. Alone, Talamea cannot bear to lose her beloved creation, and invokes the goddess Artea to bring the statue Adonis to life. Adonis is then forced to choose a life full of love but poverty with Talamea, or a life with riches with the Duchess. He decides he wants wealth more than love, and chooses a life with the Duchess.

Act 1, scene 2: Bunion Turke's cottage

Meanwhile, a small-town miller, Bunion Turke, and his daughter, Rosetta are enjoying their lives in a small cottage. Rosetta is introduced through the song "I'm a Merry Little Mountain Maid", which was one of the hit songs of the musical. The Marquis de Baccarat arrives in the village and attempts to seduce Rosetta who resists. The miller interrupts and catches him physically accosting Rosetta. He chases the Marquis off.

Act 1, scene 3: Duchess of Area's Garden

The scene begins the "Guards' March and chorus", in which the Duchess's Guards are on parade as viewed from the elaborate gardens of her estate. This is followed by the "Duchess's Tigers"; a song which featured an octet of little boys. After this, Adonis sings the song "I'm Such a Susceptible Statuette" which, while possessing original words, was set to the music of the Lord Chancellor's song from Gilbert and Sullivan's Iolanthe. Jealous of Adonis, the Marquis de Baccarat gets into a duel with Adonis and loses. Adonis meets Rosetta, falls in love, proposes, and they run off together. This upsets Bunion Turke, the Duchess, and Talamea who all have song laments.

Act 2, scene 1: A country village

The act opens with a humorous lament of the show business chorister; with each member of the chorus ensemble getting an opportunity for a short solo in which they sing of the perils of wishing to be a star only to end up in the chorus. The song featured the tenor Horace Frail, a longtime ensemble player for Rice, singing a "high C" for an extended period; a feat which earned him plaudits in the press and made him an audience favorite. Adonis and Rosette arrive to get married. Several songs ensue, including one that featured a mechanical donkey. The wedding is interrupted by the Marquis who stops the wedding after producing papers which challenge the impending marriage.

Act 2, scene 2: The Enchanted Wood

The Marquis de Baccarat forces Rosetta to marry him in secret. He attempts to dominate her after their marriage, but is thwarted by Rosetta's grit and wits.

Act 2, scene 3: Interior of a Country Store.

This scene has no plot but featured Adonis showing off his sleight of hand abilities, a barbershop quartet, and other random entertainments.

Act 2, scene 4: Forrest

Unhappy with his separation from Rosetta, Adonis begs Talamea to assist him in becoming a statue again. She eventually relents.

Act 2, scene 5: The Mystic Home of the Goddess of Art

Talamea invokes the goddess Artea once again. Adonis transforms back into statue. A placard is hung around his neck saying "Hands off!"

== Performance history ==
William Gill wrote Adonis as a sex parody of Pygmalion in which he purposely reversed the gender of the female statue come-to-life into a male statue. The work was specifically written as a starring vehicle for the actor Henry E. Dixey for whom Gill had earlier written the 1883 play Distinguished Foreigners; a work in which Dixey parodied the actor Henry Irving. Gill and Irving successfully pitched their project to the producer Edward E. Rice who had previously had success with the musical Evangeline. Rice hired James C. Scanlan to direct the production; a director who had previously worked on several productions with Lydia Thompson and her producer husband, Alexander Henderson.

Adonis premiered at Hooley's Theater in Chicago on July 6, 1884 in a performance by Rice's Big Burlesque Company with conductor John Eller leading the musical forces. The original cast included Henry E. Dixey (Adonis), Vernona Jarbeau (Talamea), Fatmah Diard (Artea), Amelia Summerville (Rosetta), Herbert Gresham (Marquis of Baccarat), George W. Howard (Bunion Turke), Jennie Reiffarth (Duchess of Area), Emma Stowe (Lady Nattie), Lillian Calef (Lady Hattie), Ida Smith (Lady Mattie), and Mollie Fuller (Lady Pattie). The role of Bunion Turke was played as a burlesque of C.W. Couldock's role of Dunstan Kirke in the very popular play Hazel Kirke.

After playing for the summer of 1884 in Chicago, most of the same cast continued in the production when it reached Broadway's Bijou Theatre in New York City on September 4, 1884. The actress Ida Smith changed her stage name to Ida Bell when it reached New York. The only cast changes were in the roles of Talamea and Artea. Jarbeau was unhappy with the size of her part, and left the production after its Chicago run. The actress Lillie Grubb was hired for the role of Talamea for the New York production. Sources vary on the original cast member in the role of Artea with T. Allston Brown in his A History of the New York Stage from the First Performance in 1732 to 1901, Volume 1 claiming it was the actress Louise Eissing, and William Gill biographer and music theatre historian Kurt Gänzl stating it was the San Francisco based actress and singer Carrie Godfrey. Godfrey is also listed in the part in Harry Miner's American Dramatic Directory for the Season of 1884-'85 which was published in October 1884 just a month after the Broadway run began, and Godfrey is listed as part of the original Broadway cast in Thomas S. Hischak's Broadway Plays and Musicals: Descriptions and Essential Facts of More Than 14,000 Shows Through 2007 (2009, McFarland & Company).

Adonis closed on 17 April 1886 after running at the Bijou Theatre for 603 consecutive performances; making it the longest-running show on Broadway during that period, and the longest Broadway run of all time until 1893. The show gave its 500th performance on 7 January 1886; an event which was marked by the creation of 500 plaster statuettes of Dixon which were all sold that night. After the show continued to run, it became the first stage work in the history Broadway to be performed more than 500 times; an achievement which has led some musical theatre historians to call the work the "first hit musical. A cocktail, the Adonis, was named in its honor when it passed 500 performances.

Most of the original Broadway company of Adonis traveled to London after the play closed in New York. The play began a twelve-week run in the West End at the Gaiety Theatre, London on 31 May 1886. The only cast changes from the New York production included Annie Alliston in the role of the Duchess, and Emma Carson in the role of Artea. While Dixey's performance was well received, the show as a whole was not well reviewed in England and failed to repeat the success it had achieved on the New York stage.

Dixey was forever after associated with the role of Adonis, and he returned to the part in several Broadway revivals and national tours; including New York revivals in 1886, 1888, 1893, and 1899.

Preceded by Hazel Kirke	Longest-running Broadway show 1885–1893	Succeeded by A Trip to Chinatown
