= Richard Marston =

English scenic designer

Richard Marston (1847–1917) was an English scenic designer who had a prominent career as a designer for Broadway productions from the 1860s into the early 20th century. After designing new sets for the very first musical, The Black Crook, at Niblo's Garden in 1867, Marston served as the resident scenic designer at first the Union Square Theatre and later the Madison Square Theatre. He was particularly admired for his outdoor set designs.

== Life and career ==
Born in Brighton, East Sussex, England in 1847, Richard Marston was the son of the celebrated Shakespearean actor Henry Marston and his wife, the actress Mrs. Henry Marston (née Georgina Caroline Noel). Before coming to the United States in 1867, Marston followed his parents into the profession of acting in his native city.

Marston left Brighton for New York City and embarked upon a career as a scenic designer. His first scenic designs for Broadway were made in 1867 for The Black Crook; a work which had premiered the year before at Niblo's Garden and was regarded as the very first musical. Marston was brought in to create new sets for the show mid-way through its long run; replacing the original sets built by the author of The Black Crook, Charles M. Barras. This was followed by the designs for The White Fawn (1868); a work which was intended as the successor to The Black Crook but which failed to gain the same popularity as the original.

Marston had lengthy careers as the resident scenic designer at two Broadway theatres, first the Union Square Theatre and later the Madison Square Theatre. He died in 1917.

== Partial list of Broadway productions ==
- The Black Crook (premiered 1866; Marston's new sets added in 1867, Niblo's Garden)
- Rose Michel (1875, Union Square Theatre)
- My Partner (1879 and 1880 revival, Union Square Theatre)
- A Parisian Romance (1883, Union Square Theatre)
- Dr. Jekyll and Mr. Hyde (1887, Madison Square Theatre)
- 1492 (1893)
- Gismonda (1894)
- The Devil's Deputy (1894)
- Fleur‐de‐Lis (1895)
- The Great Diamond Robbery (1895)
- Half a King (1896)
- Cyrano de Bergerac (1898)
- Erminie (1899)
- The Ameer (1899)
- A Little Bit of Everything (1904)
- The Prodigal Son (1905)
- A Marriage of Reason (1907)
- The Right Way (1907)
