= A Parisian Romance =

A Parisian Romance may refer to:

- A Parisian Romance, an 1883 play written by Octave Feuillet
- A Parisian Romance, a lost 1916 silent film based on the play, directed by Frederick A. Thomson
- A Parisian Romance, a 1932 American drama film, based on the play
