= John F. Sheridan =

Irish-American comic actor and female impersonator

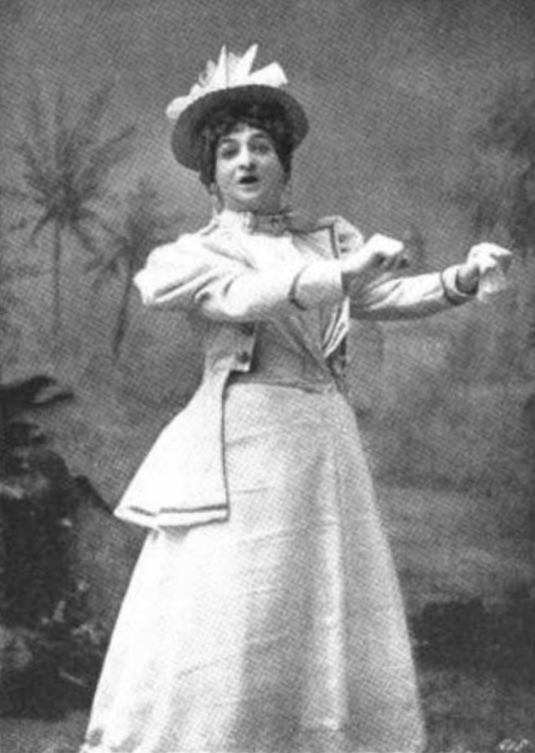
- As Lady Fitzwarren in Dandy Dick Whittington
- Born: John Francis Sheridan; 1843; Providence, Rhode Island, United States
- Died: 26 December 1908 (aged 64–65); Newcastle, New South Wales, Australia
- Occupations: Actor, female impersonator

John Francis Sheridan (1843 – 26 December 1908) was an Irish-American comic actor and female impersonator who had a long career in Australia, mostly in burlesque.

== History ==
Sheridan was born in Providence, Rhode Island, and got his start on the stage there in pantomime as the widow Mulvaney. He formed a clog dancing duo "Sliter Brothers" with James W. Mack (real surname McGraw) and first appeared with Frank Forrest's Minstrels at Pawtucket, Rhode Island, on 12 April 1864. They had a short stint with Chadwick and Webb's Minstrels, after which they were mentored by the comedian Johnny Whiting, who found them an opening at Butler's American Theatre, 444 Broadway, New York, where they renamed themselves "Sheridan and Mack" (Note: The Sheridan, Mack & Day songster held by the Library of Congress has additional biographical details of the combination, along with the words to many of their songs. The third member of the songwriting team was Charles H. Day.) and next appeared with Wood's Minstrels at 514 Broadway. They appeared with Tony Pastor in New York in 1865, then with Dan Bryant's blackface minstrel troupe until 1867. In 1869 they appeared at Tammany Hall (which did not allow blackface) with their revue Love Among he Roses. It was announced in the press that Sheridan and Mack's partnership had dissolved in October 1877.

In 1878 Sheridan left for England in Fun on the Bristol, (Note: Fun on the Bristol, a musical farce written by George Fawcett Rowe, was first produced at Newport, Rhode Island, but was heavily criticised. It was developed by E. E. Rice in New York, finally making 14th Street theatres in 1880, and was taken to London just as Nellie Stewart's Rainbow Revels was opening at the same theatre.) in which he played "Widow O'Brien", his best-known character. The production was brought to Australia in 1884 by Williamson, Garner, and Musgrove. Sheridan's later successes include the opera The Earl and the Girl, in which he was associated with Miss Heba Harlow, also A Trip to Chicago (written jointly by Sheridan and Fred Lyster), as "Johanna Murphy" and Dion Boucicault's The Shaughraun.

He died of heart failure in the early hours of Boxing Day at the Criterion Hotel, Newcastle, in which city he was due to appear in Cinderella for William Anderson that night. He had been suffering poor health for a long period, and had recently lost a fortune when a financial institution, in which he had invested heavily, failed. His remains were interred in the Waverley Cemetery.

== Publications ==
- John F. Sheridan's Songster a.k.a. John F. Sheridan's New Song Book (1900-1909)
- Uncle Tom's Cabin (1886), musical theatre by Alfred Dampier, John F. Sheridan with H. Percy Kehoe and J. A. Robertson (composers).
- Black-Eyed Susan, or, The Lass Who Loved William (1890), musical theatre by John F. Sheridan and Bert Royle, J. A. Robertson (composer), Macmahon Brothers, F. E. Hiscocks, W. J. Wilson
- Fun on the Bristol, or, A Night on the Sound (1879) George Fawcett Rowe, John F. Sheridan
- The New Barmaid (1895–1908), musical theatre by John F. Sheridan
