= Marie Bonfanti =

American ballet dancer

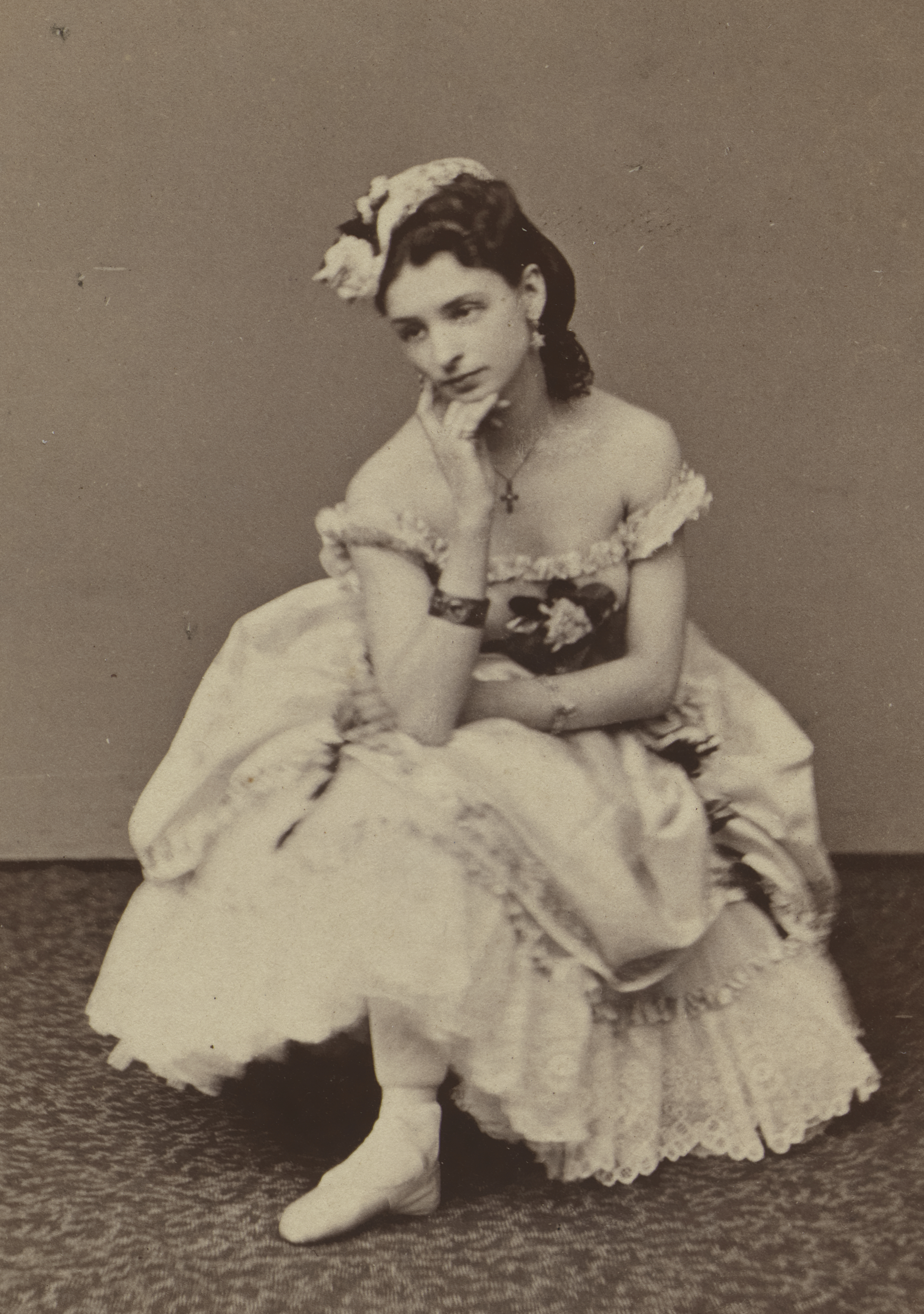
Marie Bonfanti

Anna Maria Felicita Bonfanti (1845-1921), known as Marie or Marietta Bonfanti, was an American ballet dancer.

She made her New York City debut came at Niblo's Garden on Monday, September 10, 1866. She then was the prima ballerina in The Black Crook at the same theatre, which premièred two days later. She appeared in Sylvia by Léo Delibes at the Metropolitan Alcazar concert hall on July 15, 1882. In August 1901, Bonfanti performed with Rita Sangalli at the Metropolitan Opera House, during the inaugural season of ballet at the New York City venue. Her talent for expressionist dancing and her private life were covered widely from the mid-1860s until the early 20th century.

Among her students (for a short period of time) were Ruth Saint Denis and Isadora Duncan.

Bonfanti was born in Italy. She was married to George Hoffman.
