= Niblo =

Niblo is a surname. Notable people with the surname include:

- Allan Niblo (born 1964), British film producer and director
- Fred Niblo (1874–1948), American pioneer film actor, director and producer
- Fred Niblo Jr. (1903–1973), American screenwriter
- Tom Niblo (1877–1933), Scottish footballer
- William Niblo (1790–1878), Irish-born American theatre owner
