= Adonis (cocktail) =

Sherry and vermouth cocktail

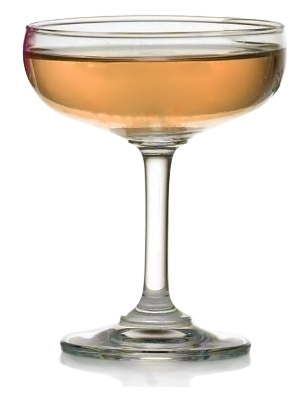
- Ingredients: 4.5 cl dry sherry; 4.5 cl sweet vermouth; 2 dashes orange bitters
- Standard drinkware: Cocktail glass
- Standard garnish: orange peel or twist
- Preparation: Combine ingredients with ice in a mixing glass. Strain into a chilled glass. Garnish with an orange peel or twist.

The Adonis is a sherry and vermouth-based cocktail, with equal parts of both. The cocktail was created in honor of the 1884 musical Adonis after the show reached the milestone of more than 500 shows on Broadway. The Adonis has been described as being a lower alcohol, easier drinking cocktail.

== See also ==
- List of cocktails
