= Angiolina Bosio =

Italian opera singer

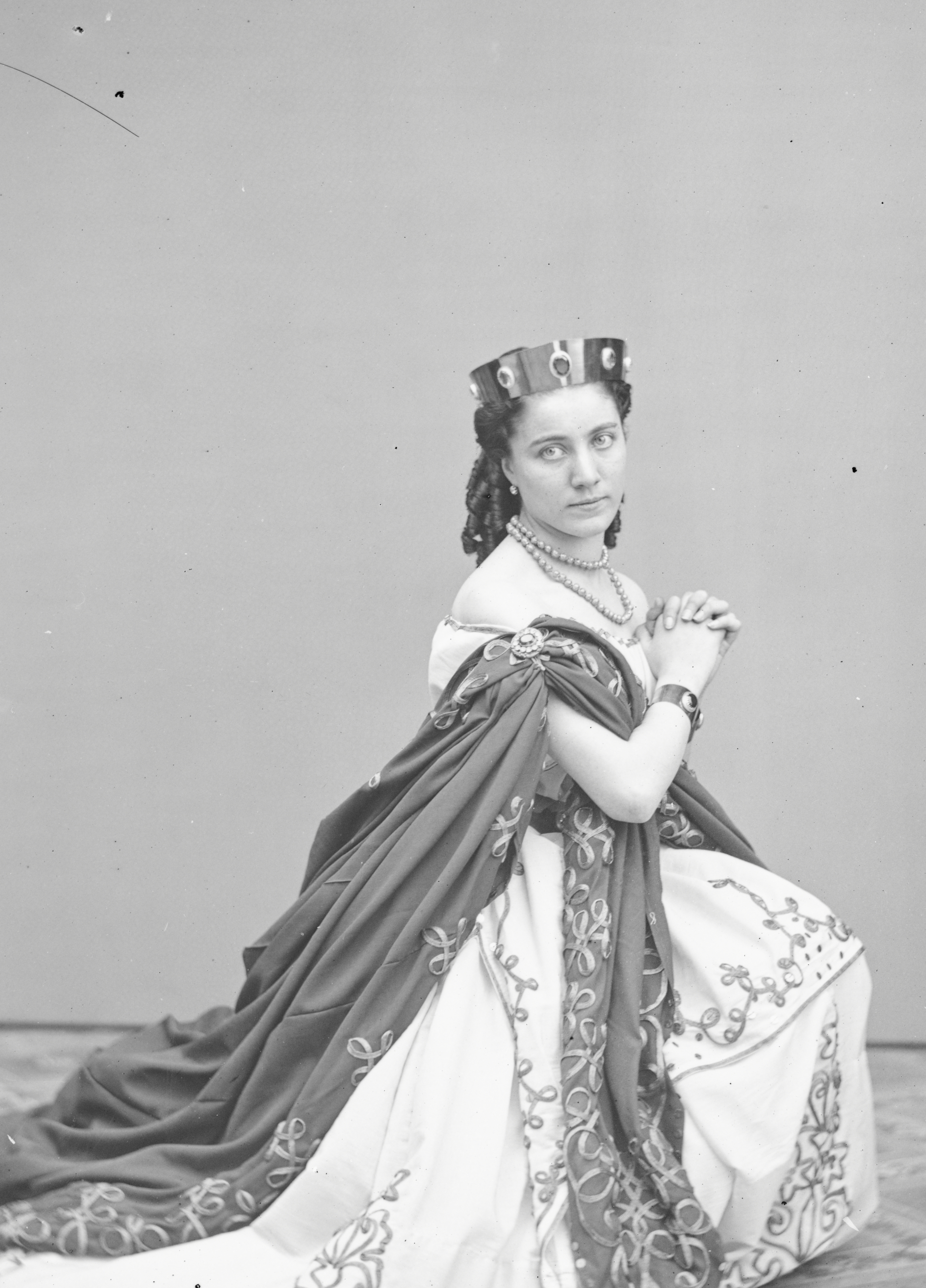
Bosio photographed by Mathew Brady

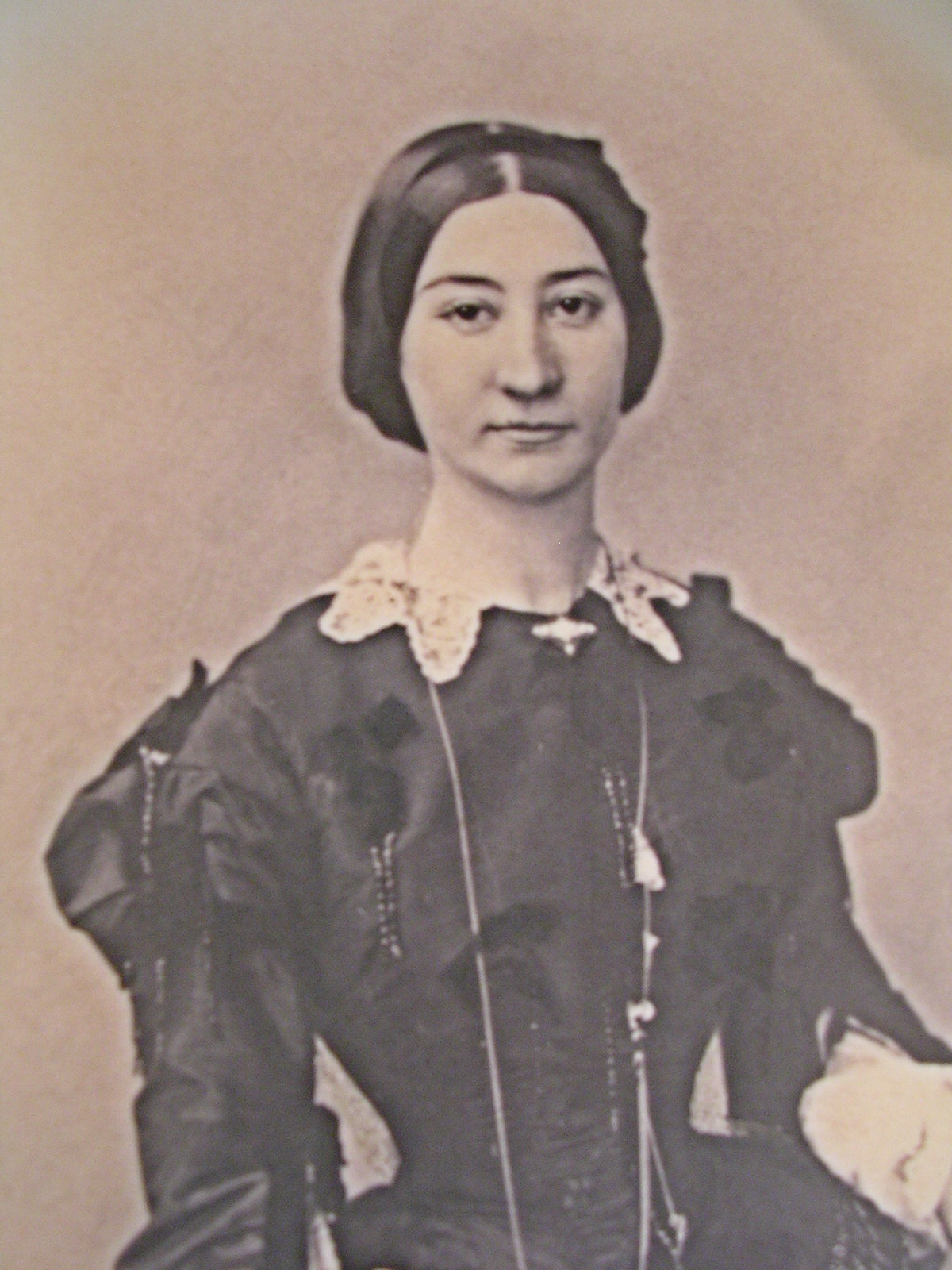
Angiolina Bosio

Angiolina Bosio (22 August 1830 - 12 April 1859) was an Italian operatic soprano who had a major international career from 1846 until her premature death in 1859 at the age of 29. She sang at the most important opera houses in Boston, Havana, London, Madrid, Moscow, New York, Paris, Philadelphia, Saint Petersburg, and Verona. She was particularly admired for her performances in operas by Giuseppe Verdi.

Her voice, although of limited volume, was exceptionally extended and flexible, capable of a large and touching phrasing. Angiolina Bosio was compared by contemporary critics to other famous sopranos, such as Maria Malibran and Henriette Sontag.

== Life and career ==
Born in Turin, Bosio's parents were both actors and she began singing in theatrical productions with them at the age of 10. From 1840-1847 she studied singing in Milan with Venceslao Cattaneo. She made her professional opera debut in that city in 1846 at the Teatro Real del Circo as Lucrezia Contarini in Giuseppe Verdi's opera I due Foscari. She returned to that theatre in 1848 to portray the role of Amazily in the world premiere of Ignacio Ovejero's Fernand Cortez. In 1847 she made successful appearances at the Teatro Carcano in Milan, the Teatro Filarmonico in Verona, the Royal Danish Theatre in Copenhagen, and the Teatro Real in Madrid.

In 1848 Bosio made her debut at the Paris Opera as Lucrezia Contarini to only moderate success. Following this performance, she lately undertook a North American trip which lasted from 1848-1851. She made appearances in theatres in New York City, Boston, Philadelphia, Baltimore, and Havana; drawing acclaim from audiences and critics in all of those cities. She notably portrayed the role of Lady Macbeth in the United States premiere of Verdi's Macbeth at Niblo's Garden in New York in 1850.

In 1851 Bosio returned to Europe and was married that year to a Greek man with the surname Xindavelonis. In 1852 she made her debut at the Covent Garden in London as Adina in Gaetano Donizetti's L'elisir d'amore. She had two major triumphs at that theatre later that year when she performed the roles of Elvira in Vincenzo Bellini's I puritani and the title role in Donizetti's Lucia di Lammermoor; notably replacing Giulia Grisi in the latter production. In 1852-1853 she was heard much more successfully at the Paris Opera in a variety of parts, including the title role in the French premiere of Luisa Miller. In the Summer of 1853 she returned to Covent Garden where she was much admired as the title heroines in Louis Spohr's Jessonda and Gioachino Rossini's Matilde di Shabran. On 14 May 1853 she portrayed Gilda in the English premiere of Verdi's Rigoletto to great success.

In 1853 Bosio accepted an invitation to join the roster of singers at the Bolshoi Kamenny Theatre in Saint Petersburg, Russia where she was given the title "Première Cantatrice" and was the highest paid singer at the theatre. She sang opposite tenor Enrico Tamberlik frequently at this opera house and performed numerous times in operas and concerts attended by Alexander II of Russia. In 1855 she left Russia to join the Théâtre-Italien in Paris where she was heard in operas by Verdi and Donizetti, and as Matilde di Shabran and Zarele in Giovanni Pacini's Gli arabi nelle Gallie. In 1856 she returned to Covent Garden as Violetta in Verdi's La traviata in a performance that was interrupted numerous times by thunderous applause from an enthusiastic audience. She was also heard there as Catherine in the English premiere of Giacomo Meyerbeer's L'étoile du nord.

In 1858 she performed again in Russia, first at the Bolshoi Theatre in Moscow and then again at the Bolshoi Kamenny Theatre. She returned to Moscow for another performance and then was traveling by train back to St. Petersburg when she caught a bad cold. The disease affected her badly and her health rapidly declined. She died in 1859 at the age of 29 in Saint Petersburg. Her funeral drew a large crowd in St. Petersburg and a monument was erected in her memory near the cathedral at the Alexander Nevsky Monastery where she is buried. She is mentioned in Nikolay Chernyshevsky's novel What Is to Be Done? and in poems by Nikolay Nekrasov and Osip Mandelstam.
