= Annie Kemp Bowler =

Annie Kemp Bowler (died August 21, 1876) was a popular stage actress and singer, best known for appearing in the original cast of The Black Crook in 1866.

Born Annie Kemp, she played the role of Stalacta in that musical. In the original advertisements, she was billed as "Miss Annie Kemp, Prima donna Contralto from Covent Garden, London, her first appearance in America in six years."

She later married English tenor Brookhouse Bowler, also performed with the Richings company and other opera companies. She died on August 21, 1876, from injuries sustained from a fall five days earlier, while rehearsing the famed transformation scene of The Black Crook for a performance at Philadelphia's National Theater. She was buried at Mount Moriah Cemetery in Philadelphia.

== Selected performances ==
In New York unless otherwise stated:

- Linda di Chamounix (1861)
- Acis and Galatea by F.C. Burnand as Acis (1863) (London)
- The Black Crook (1866)
- The White Fawn (1868) (Boston)
- Fra Diavolo (1870)
- Macbeth (1874) as Hecate, in farewell performance of Charlotte Cushman at Booth's Theatre. Kemp's rendition of Auld Lang Syne to close out the night was noted at the time.
