= George C. Boniface =

American actor (1832–1912)

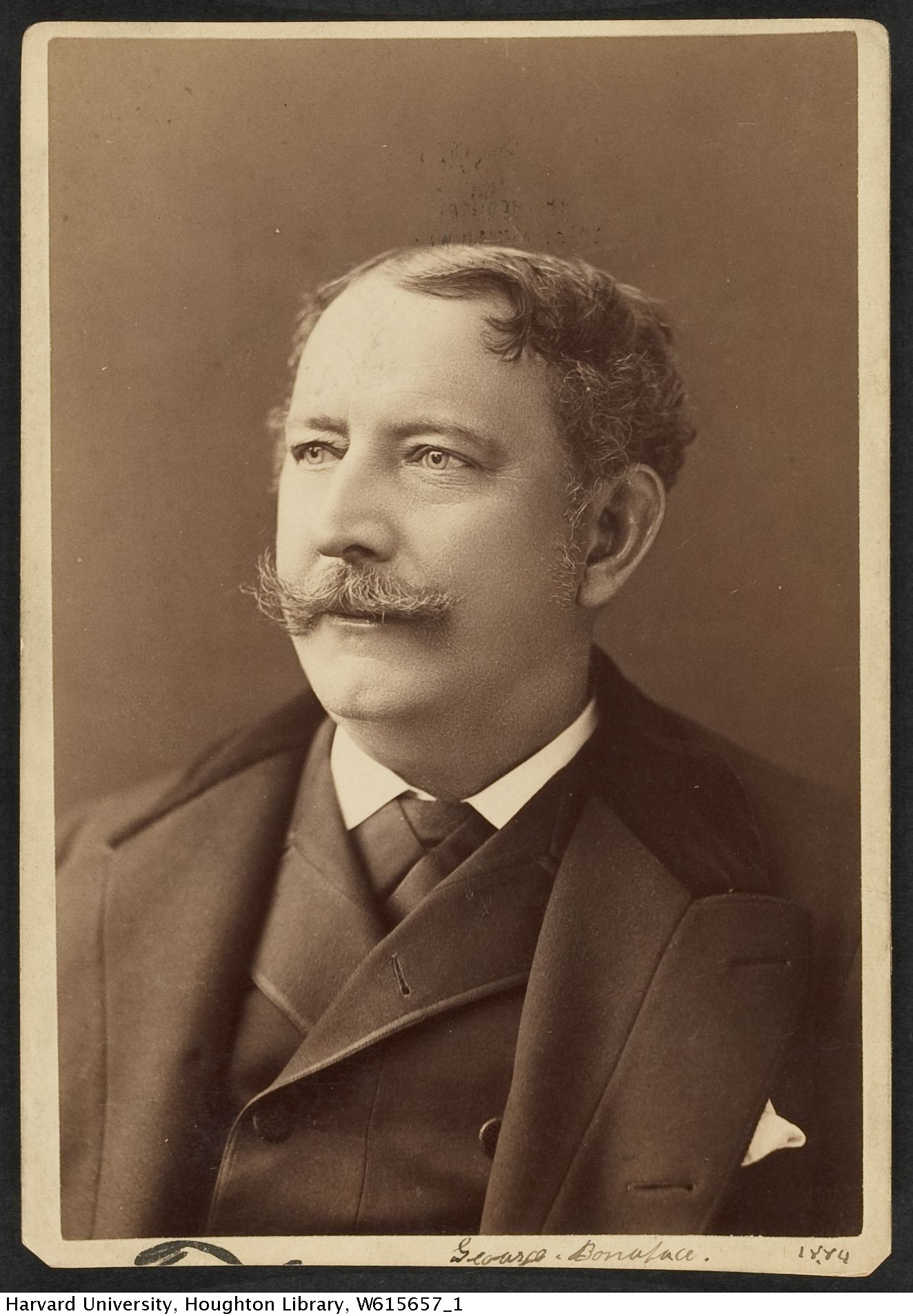
George C. Boniface, 1884

George C. Boniface (November 3, 1832 – January 3, 1912) was an American actor. He made his professional debut in Baltimore in 1851, and remained in the profession for sixty years. Among his best-known roles was as Rodolphe in the original production of The Black Crook (1866). In 1901 he portrayed Dr. Steinart in The Climbers at the Bijou Theatre. One of his last appearances was in New York with Ethel Barrymore in Mid-Channel in 1909.

Boniface had four children: Stella Weaver, Symona Boniface, John D., and George C. Boniface Jr. Stella, Symona and George Jr. were also accomplished actors.

Boniface's first wife was Margaret Newton (1840–1883).
