= John W. Blaisdell =

American stage actor (1840–1911)

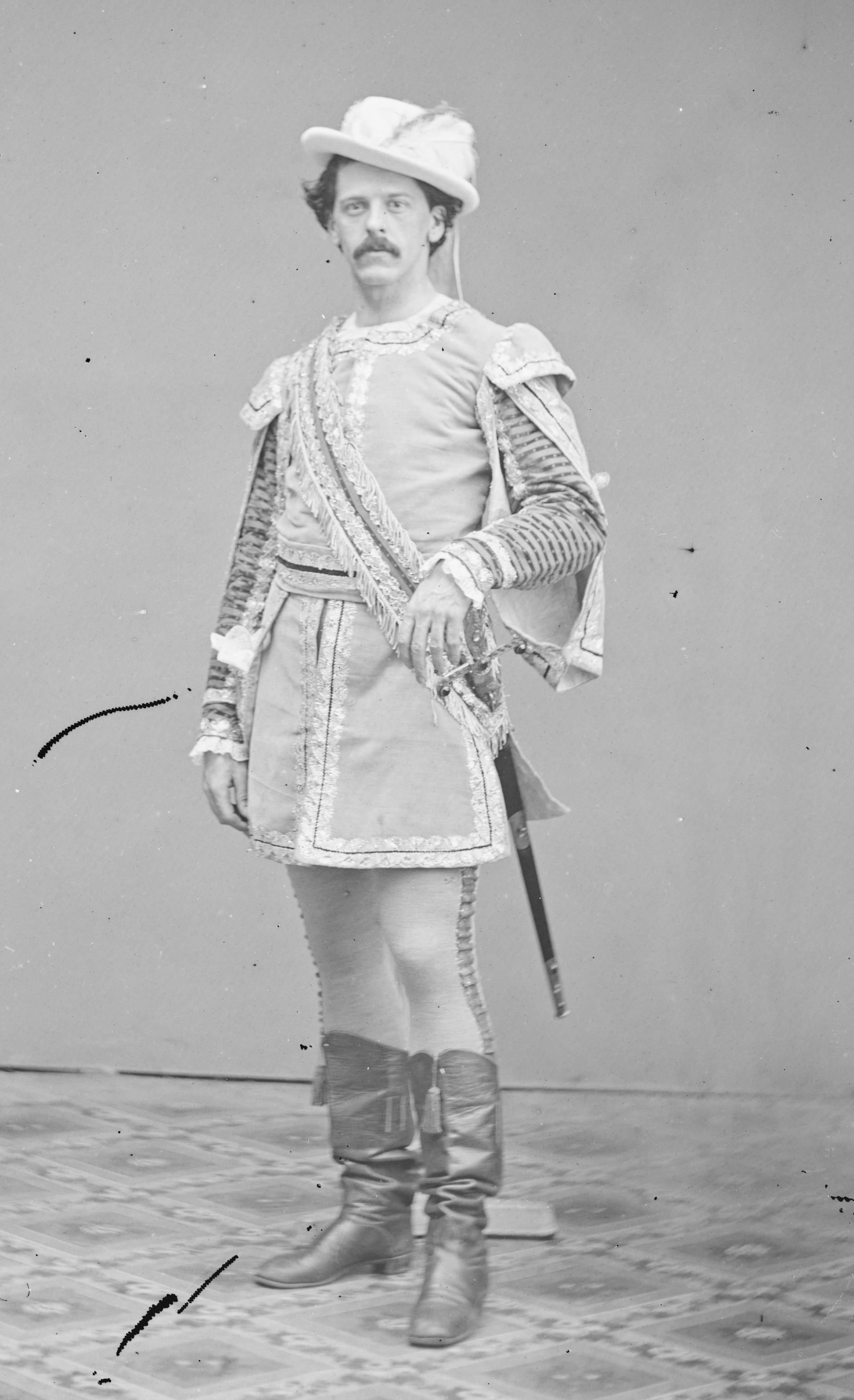

John W. Blaisdell (1840 – February 4, 1911) was an American stage actor.

Blaisdell was born in Lowell, Massachusetts in 1840, and made his stage debut at age 17, at the Boston Museum. Among his performances included being part of the original production of The Black Crook in 1866.

Blaisdell worked in Chicago for many years and was part of the Hooley company. He retired from the stage before 1900. He died on February 4, 1911, aged 70 or 71, in Chicago.
