= Rita Sangalli =

Italian ballet dancer (1849–1909)

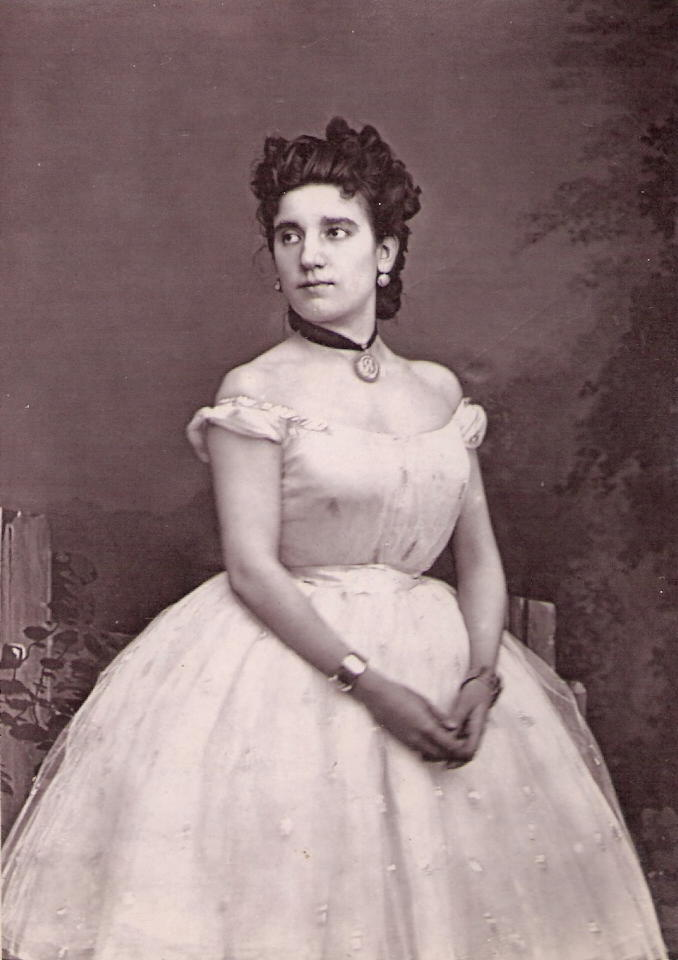
Rita Sangalli in 1874.

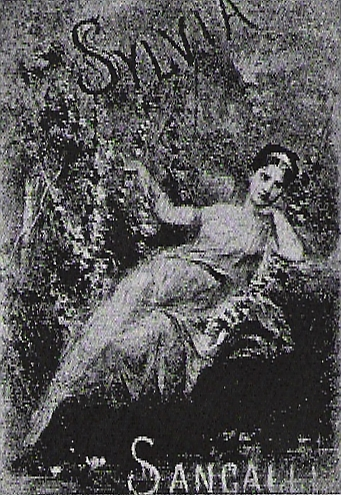
Rita Sangalli in the lead role of Sylvia by Léo Delibes at the 1876 premiere.

Rita Sangalli (20 August 1849 – 3 November 1909) was an Italian ballet dancer. Born in Antegnate, she danced in the Italian provinces of Asti, Piacenza, and Turin, making her 1865 debut at Milan's La Scala in Paul Taglioni's (1808-1884) Flik and Flok, before being hired for the opera at Her Majesty's Theatre in London. In 1872, she danced the principal role in La source at its successful revival. In the same year, she joined the Paris Opera Ballet, where she performed in numerous premieres, including in the role of Sylvia (14 June 1876), Yedda (1879), and Namouna (6 March 1882). She retired from the company in 1884. Sangalli toured America where she performed in The Black Crook and Flick Flock. In August 1901, Sangali and Marie Bonfanti performed at the Metropolitan Opera House, during the inaugural season of ballet at the New York City venue. She died in Carpesino d'Arcellasco, Italy.
