= Jarrett & Palmer =

Production partnership

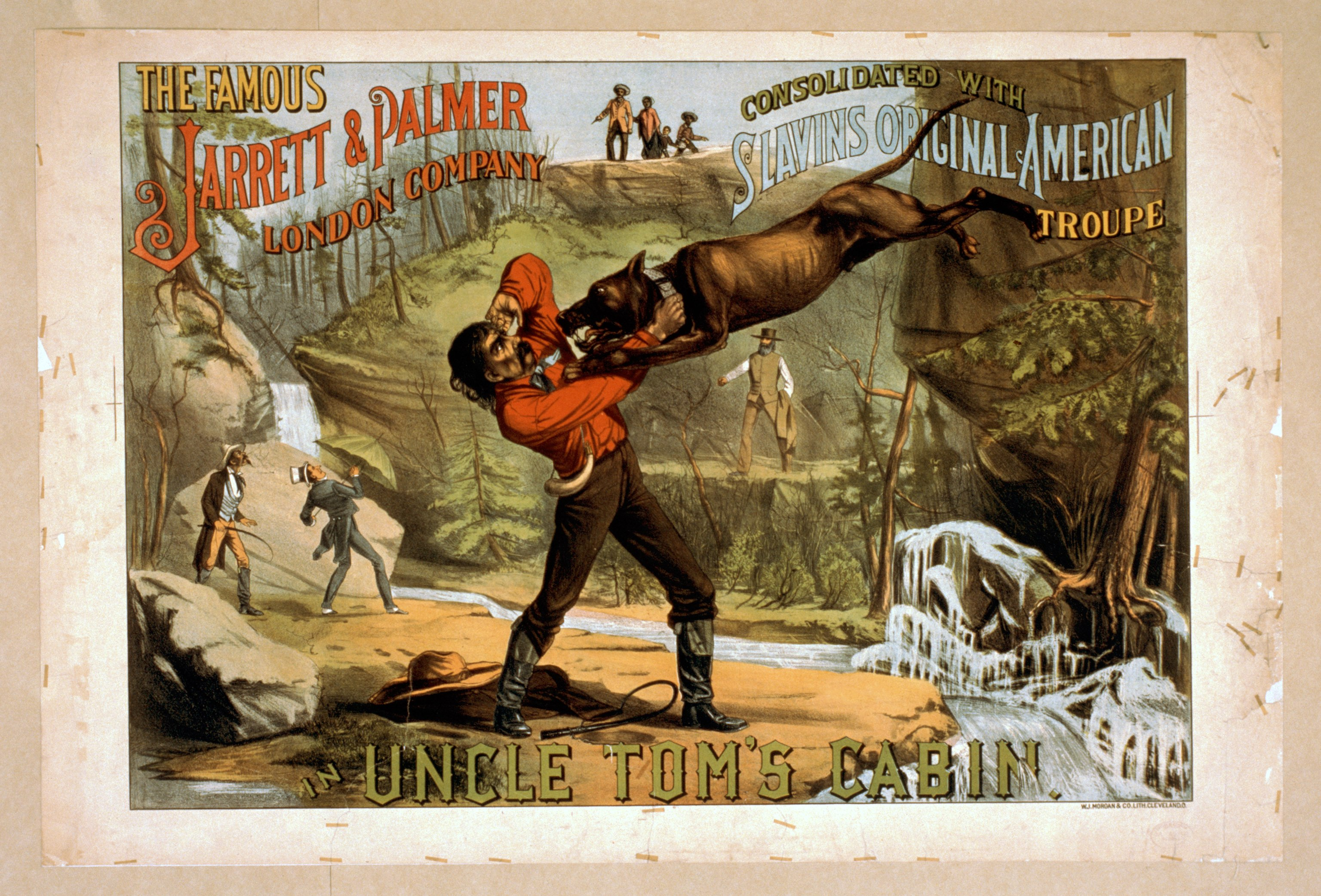
1881 poster for Jarrett & Palmer's production of Uncle Tom's Cabin

Jarrett & Palmer was an American theatrical production partnership, prominent and influential in the 1860s and 1870s.

The partners were Henry Clay Jarrett (1828–1903) and Harry Palmer (born Henry David Palmer; 1833–1879). The partnership produced the hugely successful Broadway show The Black Crook in 1866; the first transcontinental touring theatre show in the U.S. in 1876; and, in 1878, the first theatrical show in Britain that presented a company of black performers.

== Early lives ==
Jarrett was born in Baltimore, Maryland in 1828, and in early life worked as an actor. In 1851 he bought the Baltimore Museum, before becoming manager of the National Theatre in Washington, D.C. He made his first visit to Europe in 1856 and attempted but failed to persuade English theatres to use companies of American performers in theatre shows. He then worked in several theatres in the United States, becoming manager of the Boston Theatre in 1864.

Palmer was a former actor and employee of P. T. Barnum. He also acted as an agent for many leading singers and actors, including Matilda Heron, and became a Wall Street broker.

== Partnership ==
=== The Black Crook ===
Jarrett and Palmer established a production partnership in the mid-1860s. In 1866, they travelled to Europe and engaged the Parisienne Ballet Troupe to perform at the Manhattan Academy of Music in a spectacular show that also incorporated elements of an English pantomime they had seen. When the theatre burned down before the show's opening, Jarrett and Palmer negotiated with William Wheatley, the manager of Niblo's Garden, a Broadway theatre, for the company to perform instead as part of the melodrama The Black Crook. They took over the show's production, and to make it even more spectacular replaced much of the original play with their own tableaux, "transformations" of scenery, and dances involving dozens of performers. The unprecedented show that resulted was hugely successful, running on Broadway for over 15 months and 475 performances, and has been claimed as the birth of American musical theatre. In 1868, Jarrett became the manager of Niblo's Garden, but the follow-up production there, The White Fawn, was less successful.

=== The "Lightning Express" ===
In the mid-1870s, Jarrett and Palmer managed the Booth's Theatre, where they produced Shakespeare's Henry V. With the first transcontinental railroad having been completed in 1869, Jarrett and Palmer came up with the idea of transporting the entire theatrical presentation, including the scenery, props, and actors, by rail from New York to San Francisco. The exercise, officially called "Jarrett & Palmer's Special Fast Transcontinental Train" but widely dubbed the "Lightning Express", was well publicized. Setting off on June 1, 1876, the train moved at high speed, with stops minimized and other trains diverted out of the way; several towns had firework displays to mark its passing. The show was transported almost continuously from coast to coast by the "Black Fox" locomotive, in under three and a half days, twelve hours ahead of schedule. The trip was a "national source of pride and celebration", "an unqualified success [that] paved the way for transcontinental travel".

=== Uncle Tom's Cabin ===
Jarrett and Palmer produced a revival of Uncle Tom's Cabin at Booth's Theatre in 1878. They advertised for "100 octoroons, 100 quadroons, 100 mulattoes, and 100 decidedly black men, women, and children capable of singing slave choruses," and a script was commissioned from the actor and writer George Fawcett Rowe. The show opened in New York before moving to Philadelphia and Washington D.C.. Compared with earlier productions of Uncle Tom's Cabin, Rowe's script required the participation of many more African Americans. Palmer thought that "slave life, as it existed in the South in ante-war days, had never been truthfully depicted in Europe", and came up with the idea of taking the production across the Atlantic, where such a large cast of black performers (as opposed to white performers in blackface) had never previously been seen. In August 1878, the company left New York to sail to Europe on the Collins Line steamship Adriatic, and were seen off by large crowds. Among the performers were a vocal group, the Sable Quintette, who insisted on higher quality accommodation on the ship than the other performers.

The show was advertised as featuring "scores of genuine freed negro slaves", contained spectacular on-stage visual effects, and included a group of Jubilee Singers performing spirituals, as well as banjo players including the noted performer Horace Weston, comedians, dancers, and the vocal quintet. In England, they met with great success, and, under Palmer's overall direction after Jarrett returned to the U.S., were able to mount three performances in different theatres at the same time. As well as performances in London, the show toured provincial theatres in England, and elsewhere in Europe, over a period of more than eighteen months. One result of the tour was that the use of black performers started to become accepted in English theatres.

=== End of the partnership ===
Palmer died in London in July 1879, while the company was touring there. The company continued in Germany and France for a time before returning to the U.S., where the show continued to be staged at Booth's Theatre.

Jarrett later retired to England and died in London in 1903.
