= Millie Cavendish =

Millie Cavendish (died 23 January 1867), previously credited as Mrs Lawrence, was a British singer and actress, best remembered for performing You Naughty, Naughty Men in the role of Carline in the musical The Black Crook, which debuted in New York in September 1866. The song's music was by George Bickwell, with lyrics by Theodore Kennick. Though Cavendish's role in the piece was minor, and the song had no relation to the play's plot, her performance was a highlight. It was also an early example of sex exploitation, as music writer David Ewen has noted: "When Milly Cavendish stepped lightly in front of the footlights, wagged a provocative finger at the men in her audience, and sang in her high-pitched baby voice, 'You Naughty, Naughty Men' … the American musical theater and the American popular song both started their long and active careers in sex exploitation."

Cavendish had played in British music hall for 15 years under the name Mrs. Lawrence.

She died in New York on 23 January 1867 from a cranial injury sustained during an epileptic seizure. She was buried at Green-Wood Cemetery. Some superstitious actors blamed her early death on the fact that Sunday rehearsals had been held for the play, it being a common superstition among American and English actors at the time that Sunday rehearsals were bad luck.
