= Sarah Wheatley =

American actress

Sarah Wheatley born Sarah Ross (1790 Saint John, New Brunswick - July 1854 New York City) was an American stage actress.

== Biography ==
Sarah Wheatley was born Sarah Ross in Saint John, New Brunswick. Her father, a Scottish officer, died when she was two years of age.

She made her first appearance in New York City at the Park Theatre on 12 November 1805. In 1806 she married he actor Frederick Wheatley (d. 1836) and retired from the stage; but on his failure in business, she resumed her profession for the support of her family in 1811, and continued her career with great success. Wheatley was noted for her representations of old women.

She was the mother of the opera singer Julia Wheatley, the actor Emma Wheatley (d. 1854), and the noted actor and theatre manager William Wheatley.
