= Stella Weaver =

American actress (1856–1936)

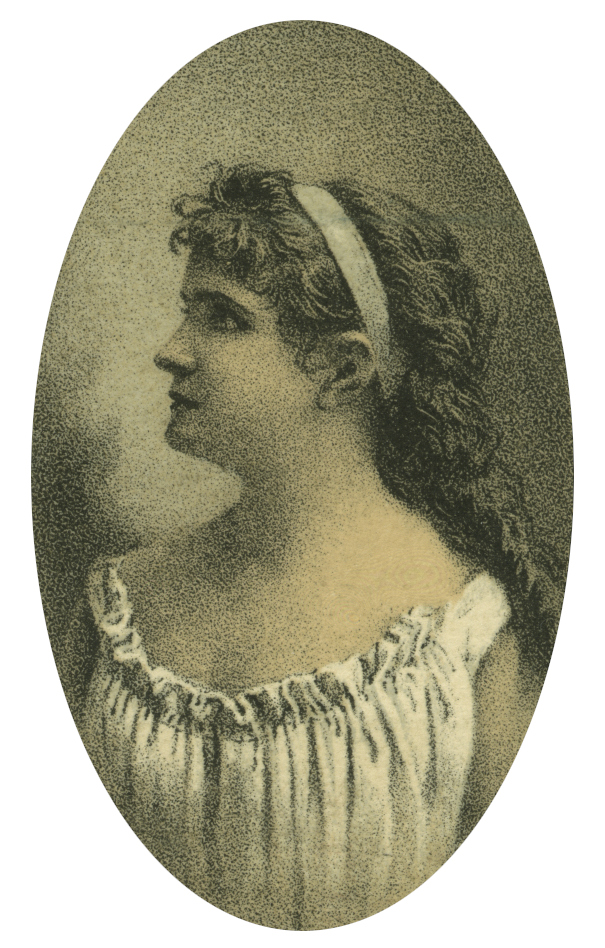
Miss Stella Boniface

Stella Boniface Weaver (1856 – June 3, 1936) was a stage actress from Richmond, Virginia. In the late 1870s and 1880s she was an important member of the company of Lester Wallack, at 13th Street and Broadway (Manhattan). She appeared in Wallack productions of False Shame (1877), The School For Scandal (1878), Our Club (1878), and My Son (1878).

== Stage career ==
The daughter of George C. Boniface, Weaver went on stage as a youth. Her fellow actors included Sol Smith Russell, John Edward McCullough, John T. Raymond, and Lawrence Barrett. In 1878 Weaver teamed with Charles Coghlan, Rose Coghlan, and John Gibbs Gilbert in The Snowball. The same year she was featured in Our Girls by H.J. Byron and appeared with Maurice Barrymore in a revival of The Shaughraun. She acted with Gilbert, Wallack, and Emily Rigl in an original production of A Child of the State. She supported Wallack in My Awful Dad, somewhat later. At Harrigan's Park Theatre, later renamed the Herald Square Theatre, Weaver was in Old Levender with Edward Harrigan. She played in a rendition of Ben Hur produced by Klaw and Erlanger and a staging of The First Year, produced by John Golden.

== Death ==
She died at the Home For Incurables in 1936. For many years she resided at the Percy Williams Home on Long Island. Weaver was survived by a sister, Mrs. Horace McVicker. She had a private funeral and is buried in Fairview Cemetery, in Red Bank, New Jersey.
