= Niblo's Garden =

1823–1895 New York Broadway theater

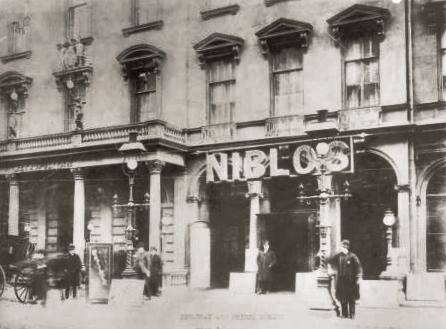
- The exterior of Niblo's Garden c. 1887
- Interactive map of Niblo's Garden
- Former names: Columbia Garden, Sans Souci
- Address: 537 Broadway; New York City
- Coordinates: 40°43′29″N 73°59′49″W
- Capacity: 3,200 (Second Garden)
- Type: Theater
- Scoreboard: ca

Construction
- Opened: 1823
- Closed: March 23, 1895
- Demolished: 1895
- Rebuilt: 1849, 1872

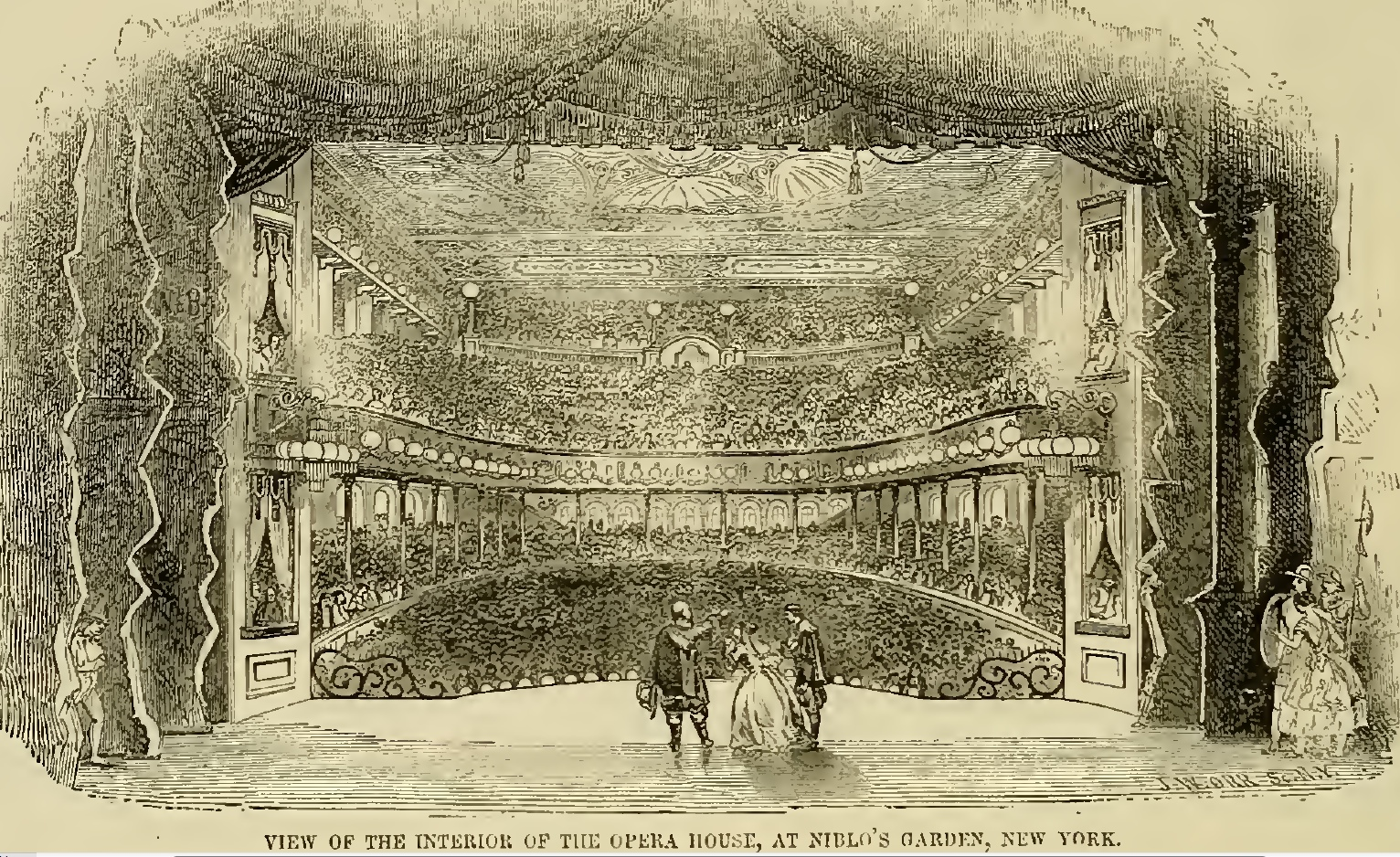
View from the stage, 1853

Niblo's Garden was a theater on Broadway and Crosby Street, near Prince Street, in SoHo, Manhattan, New York City.

It was established in 1823 as Columbia Garden which in 1828 gained the name of the Sans Souci and was later the property of the coffeehouse proprietor and caterer William Niblo. The large theater that evolved in several stages, occupying more and more of the pleasure ground, was twice burned and rebuilt. On September 12, 1866, Niblo's saw the premiere of The Black Crook, considered to be the first piece of musical theater that conforms to the modern notion of a "book musical".

== Evolution of the building site ==
William Niblo built Niblo's Theater in 1834 after having opened a "resort" which at first only served coffee, ice cream, lemonade and other refreshments. At the time, New York was undergoing a construction boom that was extending clusters of buildings much past the locale of City Hall. The garden, surrounded by a plain board fence, covered the block bounded by Prince, Houston, Broadway and Crosby Streets; in the center was the open-air saloon, used also for musical entertainments. In the evenings, Niblo's Garden was illuminated with hundreds of colored-glass lanterns. A separate garden entrance was on Broadway. The refreshment hall was in a pair of rowhouses near the southeast corner of the gardens.

The site was once a part of the Bayard farm. It was sold in lots and purchased by Jeremiah Van Rensselaer. Prior to Niblo's acquisition of the land, a circus called the Stadium occupied the ground. There was a high fence around it. New Yorkers considered it a beautiful drive up to Niblo's through neighboring suburban market gardens.

Niblo decided to supplement the refreshments with more extensive entertainment. He erected the Grand Saloon, a small theater or concert hall. The program consisted solely of musical selections until vaudeville was introduced some time later. The admission to the garden in August 1829 was fifty cents, sufficient to keep out the riff-raff. During the afternoon and evening, stagecoaches ran there from the City Hotel, later the location of the Boreel Building at 115 Broadway.

In 1835, Niblo's Garden hosted P. T. Barnum's first-ever exhibition, marking his entry into show business. In 1845, the Hutchinson Family Singers included in their sold-out performance here their abolitionist song "Get Off the Track".

During the summer of 1837, a vaudeville company was formed at Niblo's by Joseph Judson and Joseph Sefton. Farces like Promotion of the General's Hat and Meg Young Wife and Old Umbrella, played there. By the mid-19th century, the theatre was considered New York's most fashionable theatre.

== Second Niblo's Garden ==
The first theater at Niblo's Garden was destroyed by a fire on September 18, 1846. It was not reopened until the summer of 1849. The theatre seated approximately 3,200 people and had the best-equipped stage in the city. Italian opera began to be produced there around 1850. Seats were sold at $2 each. Niblo's began to draw the most popular actors and plays. Some of the many players who performed there were E. L. Davenport, William Wheatley, Bennett Barrow, and Maggie Mitchell. In 1855, Niblo convinced the tightrope walker Charles Blondin to come to America and appear at the Garden.

In the late 1860s, as post-Civil War business boomed, there was a sharp increase in the number of working- and middle-class people in New York, and these more affluent people sought entertainment. Theaters became more popular, and Niblo's began to offer light comedy. It mounted The Black Crook (1866), considered by many scholars to be the first musical comedy. This was followed by The White Fawn (1868), Le Barbe Blue (1868) and Evangeline (1874). In April 1850, the theatre presented the U.S. premiere of Giuseppe Verdi's opera Macbeth with Angiolina Bosio as Lady Macbeth.

== Third Niblo's Garden and final days ==
The theater was again destroyed by fire in 1872. It was rebuilt by the department-store magnate A. T. Stewart.

The final performance at Niblo's Garden was given on March 23, 1895. A few weeks later, the building was demolished to make way for a large office structure erected by sugar-refining titan Henry O. Havemeyer. Only a bit earlier he had purchased the Metropolitan Hotel and the theater.

Niblo's location later became occupied by early-20th century commercial buildings that span the block between Broadway and Crosby Street; one is the former site of the Museum of Comic and Cartoon Art.

== Plays presented at Niblo's ==
Year	Name	Writer
1855	Rip Van Winkle	Howard Wainwright
1858	The Phantom	Dion Boucicault
1862	The Duke's Motto	John Brougham
1863	Leah, the Forsaken	Agustin Daly
1866	The Black Crook	Charles M. Barras
1868	Le Barbe Bleue	Jacques Offenbach
1868	The White Fawn	James Mortimer
1868	Arrah-na-Pogue	T.H. Glenn
1869	The Forty Thieves	Henry Brougham Farnie
1869	The Firefly	Edmund Falconer
1869	Formosa: The Most Beautiful or the Railroad to Ruin	Dion Boucicault
1869	The Little Detective	Unknown
1869	Little Nell and the Marchioness	John Brougman
1869	The School for Scandal	Richard Brinsley Sheridan
1870	Heartsease	Edmund Falconer
1870	Innisfallen; or, The Men in the Gap	Edmund Falconer
1870	Not Guilty	Watts Phillips
1870	The Rapparee, or, The Treaty of Limerick	Dion Boucicault
1870	True as Steel	James Schonberg and Paul Meurice
1870	Under the Palm	Alfred Tennyson Tennyson
1871	Carl, the Fiddler	Charles Gayler
1871	Kit, the Arkansas Traveler	Thomas B. De Walden
1871	Richard III	William Shakespeare
1872	Black Friday	Unknown
1873	The Beasts of New York	J. J. Wallace
1873	Koomer	Unknown
1873	The Scouts of the Prairie	Edward Zane Carrol Judson
1874	The Cryptogram	James DeMille
1874	Evangeline	Edward Everett Rice
1874	Leatherstocking, or, The Last of the Mohicans	George Fawcett Rowe
1874	The Two Sisters, or, the Deformed	Unknown
1874	Wild Cat Ned	Barrett Sylvester
1877	Cross and Crescent	Unknown
1877	The Law of the Land	Unknown
1878	The Craiga Dhoul	N. Hart Jackson
1878	The Gascon	Théodore Barrière and Louis Davyl
1878	Love and Labor	Unknown
1878	M'liss	Clay Greene
1878	New York and London	George Fawcett Rowe
1878	The Serpent and the Dove	Unknown
1878	Hearts of Steel	Edmund Falconer
1882	Mardo, or, The Nihilists of St. Petersburg	Unknown
1882	Viva	Leonard Grover
1883	The Pavements of Paris	Adolphe Belot
1884	The Blue and the Gray	Elliot Barnes
1885	The Bandit King	Unknown
1885	Clio	Bartley Thomas Campbell
1886	Bound to Succeed	Henry Pettitt and George Conquest
1886	Enemies	Charles Coghlan
1886	The Ivy Leaf	Con Murphy
1886	Theodora	Victorien Sardou
1887	Rienzi	Mary Russel Mitford and Steele MacKaye
1887	A Run of Luck	Augustus Harris and Henry Pettitt
1887	She	Henry Rider Haggard
1887	Travers House	Unknown
1888	The Two Sisters	Denman Thompson and George W. Ryer
1888	The Stowaway	Tom Craven
