= Charles M. Barras =

19th-century American actor and playwright

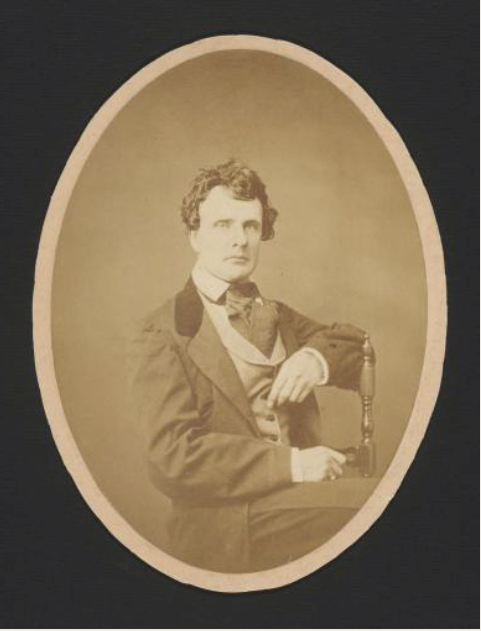
- Born: 1826
- Died: March 31, 1873 (aged 46–47); Cos Cob
- Occupation: Actor, playwright
- Spouse(s): Sallie St. Clair

Charles M. Barras (1826 – March 31, 1873) was an American actor and playwright best known for writing the book inspiring the hit musical play The Black Crook.

Early in his life, Barras trained as a carpenter and served for three years in the US Navy. In 1860, he married danseuse and soubrette Sallie St. Clair. In 1861, he was manager of Pike's Opera House in Cincinnati, Ohio, when he earned acclaim for his performance of the title character in an adaptation of Molière's The Imaginary Invalid.

Barras wrote The Black Crook (1866) as a standard melodrama, but the piece was transformed by producers Jarrett & Palmer, under an agreement with theatre manager William Wheatley, into a musical extravaganza. The spectacular success of The Black Crook earned Barras a fortune of some $250,000 (about $5,000,000 today).

Barras built a country house on the Mianus River in Cos Cob, Connecticut, near its railroad station and was a weekly train passenger. On March 31, 1873, while the train was stopped on a trestle bridge, Barras jumped from the train, but instead of landing on the bridge, he fell through it to the rocks below and died.
