= A Parisian Romance (play) =

1883 play

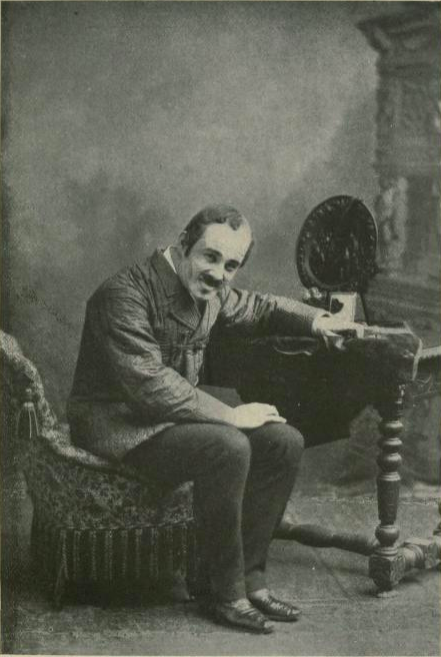
Richard Mansfield as Baron Chevrial

A Parisian Romance (French: Un Roman Parisien) is a play written in French by Octave Feuillet and adapted in English by Augustus R. Cazauran. Producer A. M. Palmer staged it at the Union Square Theatre on Broadway, where it debuted on January 11, 1883, with Richard Mansfield starring as Baron Chevrial. Mansfield later purchased the rights to the play and made it part of the repertory of his touring company. The production used sets designed by Richard Marston.

In 1932 Allied Pictures produced a film adaptation, also titled A Parisian Romance, directed by Chester M. Franklin. It starred Lew Cody and Marion Shilling.
