= William Wheatley =

American actor

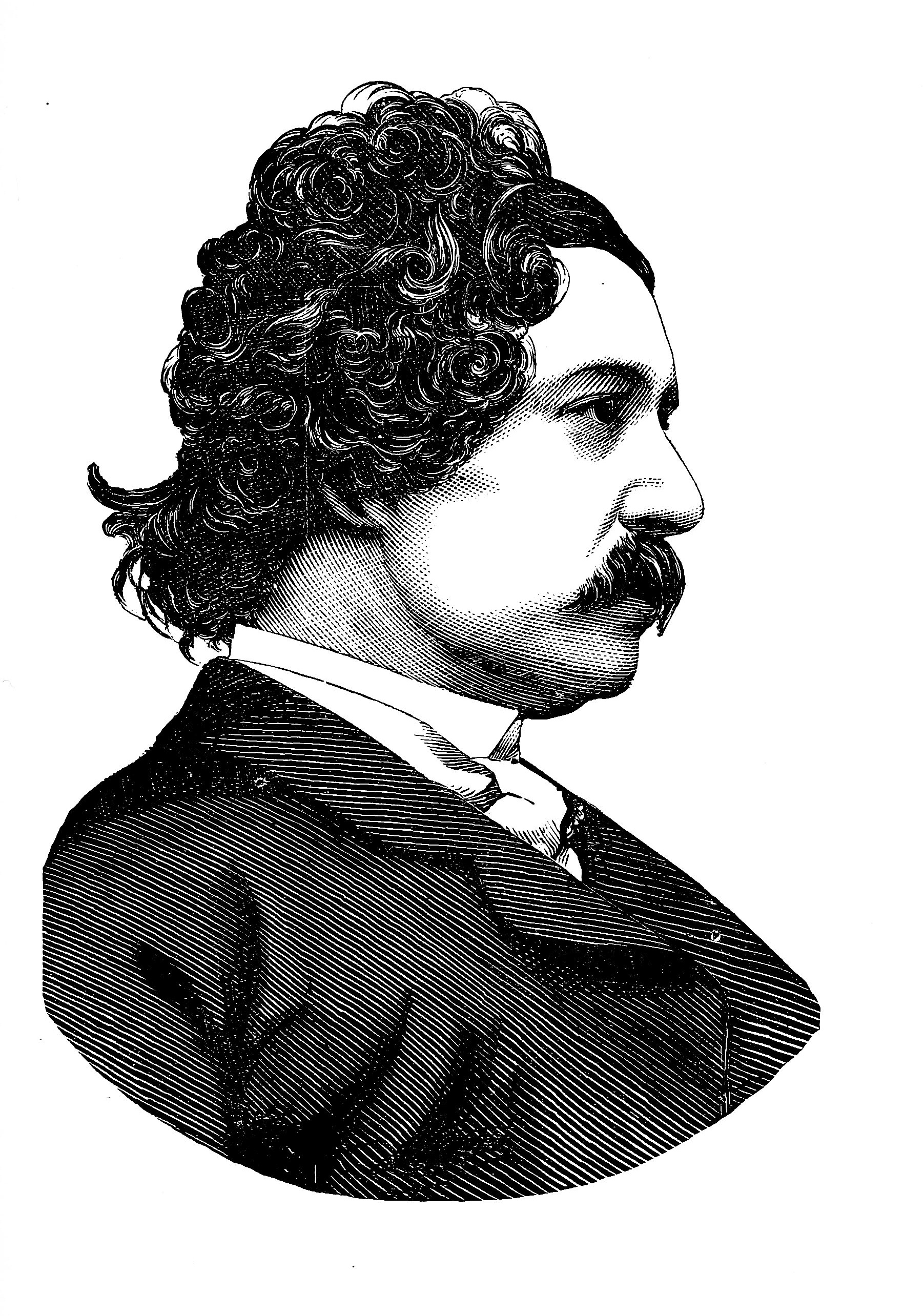
- Born: December 5, 1816; New York City, New York
- Died: November 3, 1876 (aged 59); New York City, New York
- Occupation: Stage actor
- Parent: Frederick Wheatley

William Wheatley (December 5, 1816 – November 3, 1876) was an American stage actor.

== Biography ==
He was born in New York City, the son of Frederick Wheatley, once a favorite actor in Baltimore and Philadelphia. His mother was Sarah (Ross) Wheatley, who died in 1873. She was an admirable and a justly renowned actress. He inherited talent for acting, together with a predilection for the stage.

His first public appearance was made when he was a child, on October 13, 1826, at the Park Theatre, as "Albert" in William Tell, during an engagement played by Macready, who expressed approbation of the boy, and encouraged expectation of his success. In 1833 he was at the Bowery Theatre, acting walking-gentlemen (subordinate parts requiring dress and deportment as the chief qualifications). In 1834 he returned to the Park Theatre and was assigned to such parts as Laertes, Henry Moreland, Charles Courtly, Sir Thomas Clifford, Alfred Evelyn, and Claude Melnotte. He first attracted unusual notice there in the drama of "Rienzi."

On September 22, 1842, Wheatley appeared at the Walnut Street Theatre, Philadelphia, as Doricourt, in "The Belle's Stratagem" — a character which always remained a favorite with him, and in which, as in Rover in "Wild Oats," he delighted the public by his energetic vivacity and sun-bright merriment. His success in Philadelphia was brilliant and he became a popular favorite and long continued to be. On March 24, 1843, Wheatley took a farewell benefit at the Chestnut Street Theatre, Philadelphia, and temporarily retired from the Stage.

In 1847 he played a star engagement at the Park Theatre, New York, in conjunction with his brilliant sister Emma Wheatley, afterward Mrs. James Mason. At about that time he visited Nicaragua, and it is said that the first American flag flown there was raised by his hands, — on the shore of Virgin Bay. In 1853 he became associated with John Drew in the direction of the Arch Street Theatre, Philadelphia, and there he continued to manage and act, — at first with Drew, then alone, and then with John Sleeper Clarke, — till the spring of 1861. In the spring of 1862, after acting at Niblo's Garden in the Wallack-Davenport Combination, he leased that theatre, and he continued to manage it until the autumn of 1868 (producing the record-breaking and historically important The Black Crook in 1866), when he sold his interest to Messrs. Jarrett & Palmer and finally retired from management and from the Stage.

He died in New York City on November 3, 1876.
