= Evangeline (1874 musical) =

Musical comedy by Rice and Goodwin that premiered in New York in 1874

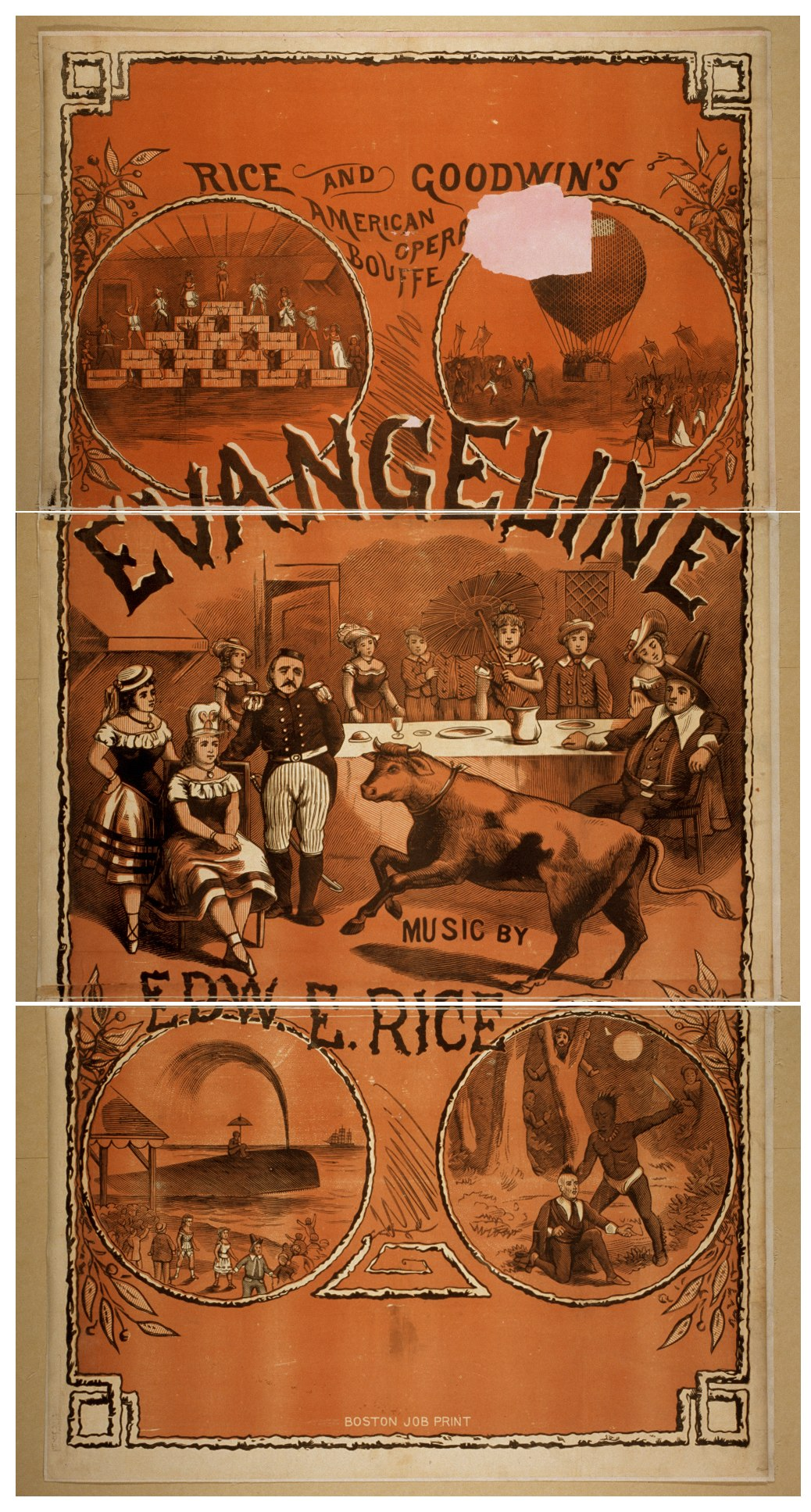
- Poster for Evangeline (1878)
- Music: Edward E. Rice
- Lyrics: J. Cheever Goodwin
- Book: J. Cheever Goodwin
- Basis: Evangeline by Henry Wadsworth Longfellow
- Premiere: 27 July 1874: Niblo's Garden
- Productions: 1874 Broadway; 1877 Broadway; 1885 Broadway

Evangeline; or, The Belle of Acadia is a musical Extravaganza, with music by Edward E. Rice (arranged and orchestrated by John J. Braham) and lyrics and book by J. Cheever Goodwin. It was a comedy loosely based on Henry Wadsworth Longfellow's 1847 serious epic poem Evangeline. The title character is a young American maiden of French Acadian stock, who is forced to leave her home and is separated from her beloved. A notary stalks her, holding a secret will that may prevent her from gaining her inheritance.

The extravaganza debuted at Niblo's Garden in New York City on July 27, 1874, and received many revivals throughout the late 19th century.

== Background ==
In the 1870s, many of the musical theatre works playing in New York were British imports. Edward E. Rice and J. Cheever Goodwin thought they could write a better and distinctly American piece. At first, they billed it as an "American burlesque", but that was thought too racy. Next they tried an "American opéra-bouffe", but decided that the term was elitist, and still had sexual connotations. Rice said that he wanted the show "to foster a taste for musical comedy relieved of the characteristic and objectionable features of opéra-bouffe". They eventually decided on "American extravaganza".

Though the show was originally conceived in three acts, various condensed two act versions appeared that eliminated the Arizona act and moved the dancing heifer scene from the finale to the end of act one. This is the only version of the show that has survived, because the script for the final act was lost.

== Productions ==
Rice funded the musical's original production at Niblo's Garden in New York City, premiering on July 27, 1874, which played for a limited run of 16 performances, followed by a successful tour. The original cast included Lizzie Harold and Ione Burke alternating in the title role, as well as James Dunn, W. H. Crane as LeBlanc, Connie Thompson in the trouser role of Gabriel, and Louis Mestayer (in drag) as Gabriel's aunt Catherine.

Although the musical's initial run was only modestly successful, it was revised and received a successful production in Boston the following year. It played again in New York in 1877. Young comedians Henry E. Dixey and Richard Golden achieved their breakthroughs as the two halves of the dancing heifer, and Lillian Russell was in the chorus in 1880. In 1880, the critic of the New York Dramatic Mirror wrote, "The vitality of the extravaganza is something wonderful, considering the length of time it has been before the public. Some of the old, pointless puns and gags have been eradicated, only to be replaced by new puns and gags just as witless and just as inane as their predecessors. When it is all over, the question arises, What is there in Evangeline that should ever have gained for it the amount of public favor it has enjoyed?" Among other revivals, it was given a successful Broadway revival in 1885, running for 252 performances. In this, Fay Templeton made her professional stage debut playing Gabriel, and Irene Verona played the title role. The show continued to be revived and toured throughout the late 19th century, accumulating a total of more than 3,000 performances; the only musical that fared better during that period was The Black Crook.

== Synopsis ==
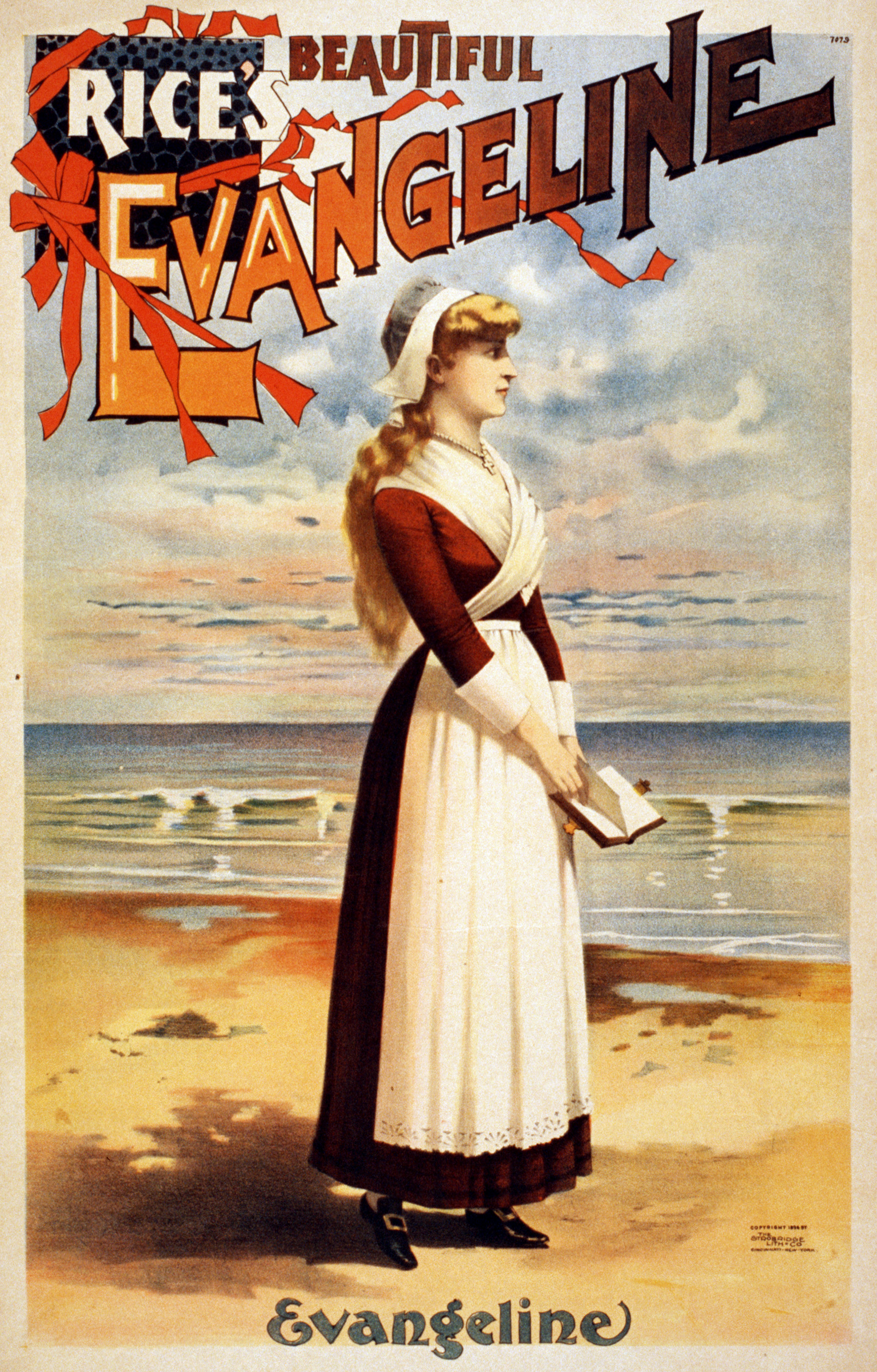
Poster for Evangeline (1896)

Young Evangeline (or Eva) is an American girl of French Acadian stock, who becomes betrothed to her beloved, Gabriel. She comes to harbor some deserting sailors, and she and her companions are arrested for this crime by Captain Dietrich of the British Army, who intends to send her to France by ship for imprisonment in the Bastille. She is separated from Gabriel. Her friend Eulalie hopes for women's rights. The ship carrying her, her companions and her beautiful, dancing heifer runs aground off the coast of a diamond-rich African country, ruled by savage King Boorioboola Gha.

A series of lovesick wanderings and episodes ensue, including a meeting with a monster whale and a balloon flight to Arizona's uncharted Indian territory. Evangeline is pursued, wherever she goes by the foolhardy Le Blanc, an Acadian notary, who holds a secret will that will legally divert Evangeline's inheritance to himself if she signs a marriage contract, an event that is repeatedly, ludicrously interrupted. All ends happily.

== Musical numbers ==
Act 1

- We Must Be Off
- One Moment, Pray – Gabriel
- There's a Man – Gabriel and Chorus
- I'm a Fascinating Notary – LeBlanc
- Thinking, Love, of Thee – Evangeline
- Into the Water We Go – Evangeline, Eulalie, Catherine, Rose and Marie
- She's Saved! She's Saved!
- My Love and I – Gabriel
- Sammy Smug – LeBlanc and Chorus
- My Heart – Evangeline
- Golden Chains – Evangeline and Gabriel
- I Hope It Won't Happen Again – LeBlanc
- In Us You See
- He Says She Must Go
- My Thoughts Are Far Away – Evangeline

Act 2

- Clink! Clank!
- We Are Off (to Seek for Eva) – Catherine, and LeBlanc
- Let's Quietly Steal Away
- Sweet the Song of Birds – Gabriel and Evangeline
- I Like It, Don't You? – Gabriel
- Twelve O'Clock, and All Is Well
- Prowling 'Round the Diamond Fields
- She's Acquitted, (He's Outwitted)

Act 3

- Fie Upon You! Fie! – Evangeline
- (We Are the) Six Miserable Ruffians
- Does She Love Me? – Gabriel
- O Gabriel, My Best Beloved – Evangeline
- Goodnight to One and All
- Homeward Bound

Source: IBDB listing for the 1885 Broadway revival
