= George Fawcett Rowe =

English playwright

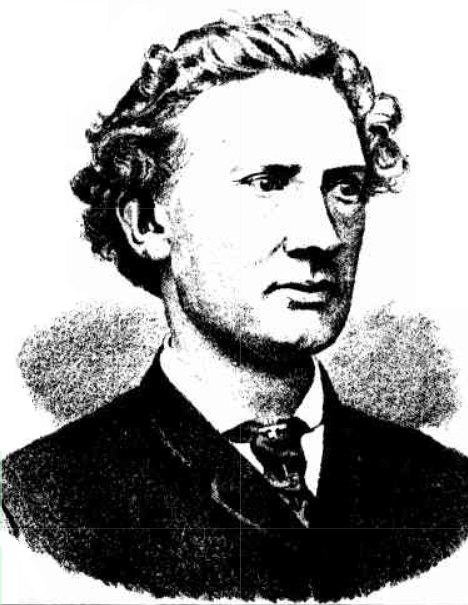
George Fawcett Rowe

George Curtis Fawcett Rowe (24 July 1832 – 29 August 1889), was an English actor, manager and dramatist, whose career began in Australia as George Fawcett; later he was billed as George F. Rowe and worked in Britain and America, where he died. Well known for his portrayal of Wilkins Micawber in his own version of David Copperfield, he was a talented, but "impatient", playwright and actor.

== Early life ==
Rowe was born in Exeter, Devon, the eldest son of printmaker and watercolor artist George Rowe Sr (1796–1864) and his wife Elizabeth. In 1834 the family moved to Cheltenham, where Rowe was educated. Rowe Sr traveled to Australia in 1852, continuing to the Ballarat and Bendigo Goldfields region of Victoria, where he made a good living selling paintings to gold diggers who had become suddenly wealthy. He returned to England in 1859.

== Australia and New Zealand ==
Rowe may have accompanied his father to Australia in 1852; other references have him joining him there in November 1853. He was also a capable artist, signing his work "George Fawcett" to distinguish it from his father's. (Note: The newspaper Truth reported that around 1857 Rowe had five large (5 by 3 feet (1.5 m × 0.9 m)) watercolors, including views of Ballarat, Bendigo, and Hobart Town, on display in a Collins Street establishment, said to be gallery quality and worth at least £500. It is doubtful that an amateur painter's work would be described as so valuable, so this may be a misattribution that properly belongs to Rowe's father.) He applied for a job as scene painter at the Queen's Theatre, Melbourne, but was not successful. He returned to Bendigo, where he started with the new Cairncross's Theatre in 1854, first as a painter, then as an actor, playing Jeremy Diddler in Raising the Wind. In February 1856 he became a scene designer for Henry Coleman's Criterion Theatre, next door to Cairncross's.

He returned to Melbourne in 1856 and soon had a success in The Death of Marlowe, by Richard Henry Horne. He became manager of the Theatre Royal together with Henry Edmunds. He then joined John Black's company at the Princess's Theatre, supporting the sisters Josephine "Joey" and Adelaide Gougenheim. He was praised in 1857 in the role of Percy Ardent in Boucicault's Irish Heiress. In December 1858 he played the name part in an adaptation of Nicholas Nickleby, opposite Edmund Holloway's John Brodie, followed by Cameralzerman and Badoura. He created popular impersonations of famous people, but he had ambitions to be taken seriously as an actor. He played Plumper in Cool as a Cucumber, by Blanchard Jerrold, Dazzle in London Assurance, Triplet in Masks and Faces, and Salem Scudder in The Octoroon in 1861, starring Madame Marie Duret, under Rowe's management.

Between 1859 and 1863 he was almost exclusively attached to the Princess's Theatre, as actor, manager and dramatist, writing numerous Victorian burlesques, pantomimes and other pieces. In 1862 he first produced his own stage version of David Copperfield, in which he took the role of Wilkins Micawber; he reproduced this piece numerous times, interpreting and playing the character of Micawber so effectively that in later years theatre managers could not imagine him in any other part, to the detriment of his career. In 1863, he wrote a short musical The Captain of the Vulture (based on the novel by Mary Elizabeth Braddon), which played as an afterpiece to Tom and Jerry, or Life in London. In another of his musical afterpieces, The Chamber of Horrors, Rowe played several characters that featured in a local waxworks exhibition.

He left for New Zealand in December 1863, leaving the unprofitable Princess's Theatre vacant for several weeks. In July 1865 Rowe and Mr and Mrs Charles Dillon left New Zealand for Callao, Peru, and then appeared at the Teatro Segura opera house in Lima.

== Later career ==
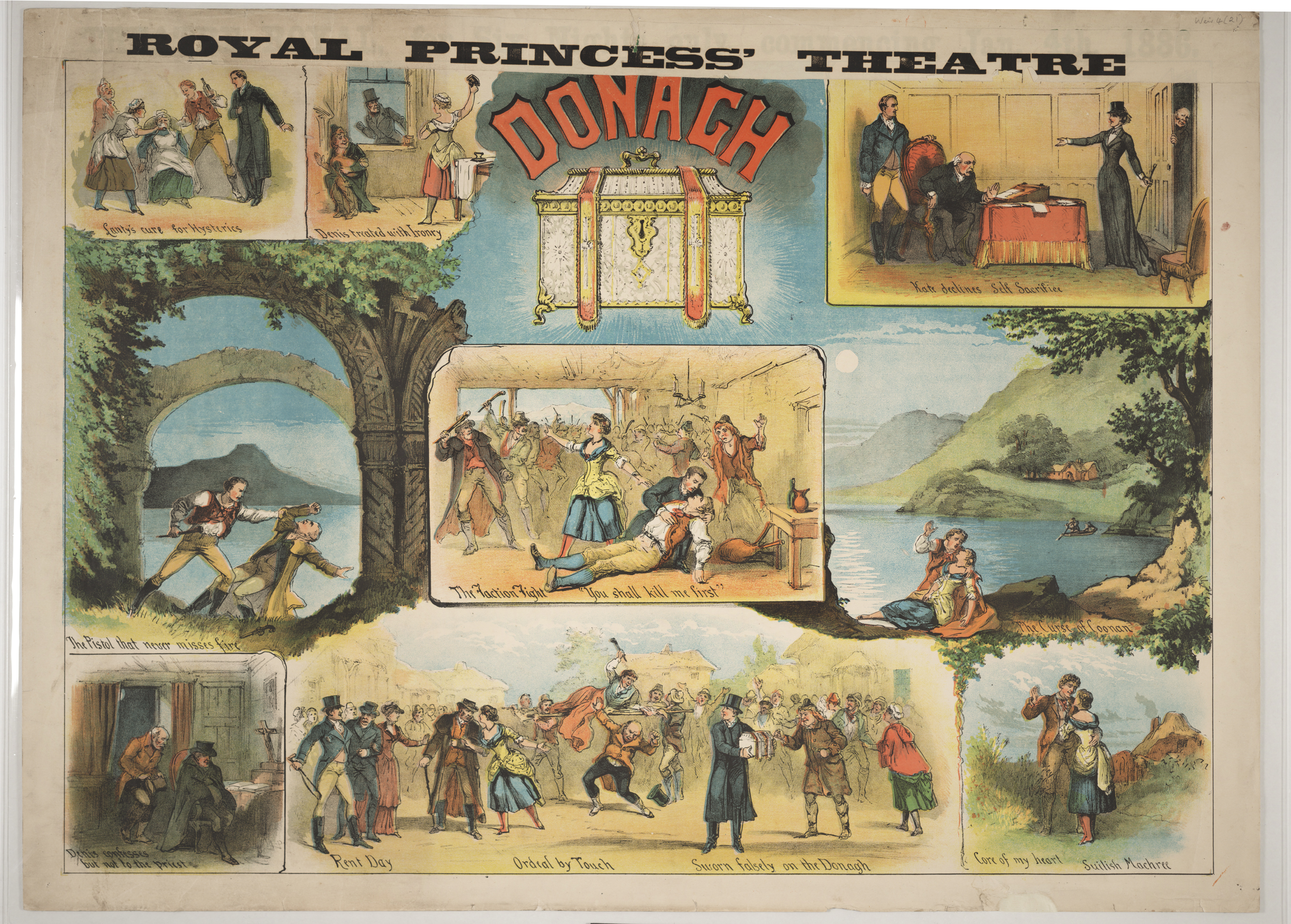
Poster for Rowe's play The Donagh (1886)

He then continued to New York where, on 26 February 1866 he appeared at the Olympic Theatre, under the management of Mrs. John Wood, playing Sir Charles Coldstream in Used Up, adapted by Charles Mathews from Boucicault's translation of the French comédie en vaudeville L'homme blasé by Duvert and Vauxroussel. Whereas he had appeared as George Fawcett in Australia, he now used his surname, Rowe, on stage. His play Fifth Avenue was a success, starring George Rignold, and another original drama, The Geneva Cross was also a success. It was later played at the Theatre Royal, Melbourne, on 22 April 1874. Fifth Avenue later became New Babylon.

He returned to England on 14 July 1866. In one week during this period at the Royal Lyceum Theatre, Sunderland he played Micawber in David Copperfield, Jack Wilding in The Liar; Plumper in Cool as a Cucumber; Clorinda in Cinderella and the title role in the French drama Salvator Rosa; other pieces were Masaniello, The Ticket-of-Leave Man, and the comedies The Wonder and The Serious Family. He produced his own plays, Geneva Cross and Brass. He asked for, and finally received, Charles Dickens' blessing for an adaptation of David Copperfield titled Little Em'ly that he and Andrew Halliday had written; it was produced at London's Olympic Theatre in December 1869 and often revived.

Rowe worked in America for most of the 1870s and 1880s. He played Digby Grant in Two Roses by James Albery in 1872 and Hawkeye in his own adaptation of Fenimore Cooper's Last of the Mohicans in 1874. He is said to have written or dramatized some 40 works for others during this period, including Mephisto and the Four Sensations, a burlesque for Lydia Thompson in 1873; The Sphinx (an adaptation of Feuillet's melodrama), written in 1874 for Clara Morris; and Uncle Tom's Cabin, from the Harriet Beecher Stowe novel in 1878 for the Jarrett & Palmer company. His greatest success was Fun on the Bristol; (Note: The Bristol was a paddle steamer, a luxury vessel that shuttled between New York and Boston.) Or, A Night on the Sound (Note: Presumably Long Island Sound) (1879). He wrote this three-act variety show for John F. Sheridan, expanding Sheridan's shorter version, starring "Widow O'Brien", one Sheridan's comic pantomime dame roles.

He did, however, return to Britain several times: He played Silas Wegg in his adaptation of Our Mutual Friend at the Opera Comique. In 1884 he produced a drama, Freedom, in conjunction with Augustus Harris, at the Theatre Royal, Drury Lane, but it was not successful. After this he returned to America and only visited England one more time, in the year before he died. An unhappy marriage to actress Kate Girard and unfortunate stock speculations drained Rowe of his sometimes considerable theatrical profits.

He had envisaged returning to Victoria, but died, destitute, in New York, and was buried in the actors' section of the Evergreen Cemetery. Nevertheless, he has been considered, along with W. M. Akhurst, to be one of Australia's foremost dramatists of the 1850s and 1860s.

== Selected works ==
(All references except where otherwise noted)

- (possibly) Fortunio; Or, The Seven Gifted Servants (pantomime) 1857
- Beauty and the Beast (pantomime) 1858
- Harlequin Prince Humpty Dumpty (pantomime) 1859
- Il Travatore (burlesque) 1859
- The Enchanted Isle (burlesque) 1859
- Mydea – A Lesson to Husbands 1860
- (possibly) Pluto and Prosperinel; Or, The Triumphs of Ceres 1860
- Harlequin Mother Hubbard and Puss in Boots (pantomime) 1861
- Masaniello (burlesque) 1861
- Cupid and Zephyr (burlesque) 1861
- Endymion, the Naughty Boy Who Cried for the Moon (burlesque) 1861
- Puss in Boots (burlesque) 1862
- The Captain of the Vulture (based on the novel by Mary Elizabeth Braddon) 1863
- Thesus and Ariadne; Or, The Marriage of Bacchus (burlesque) 1863
- The Geneva Cross played at the Theatre Royal, Melbourne, 22 April 1874
- The Last of the Mohicans adaptation of (Fenimore Cooper's novel) 1874
- The New Babylon (melodrama) 1878
- Fun on the Bristol; Or, A Night on the Sound (variety show), first performed at Newport Theatre, Long Island, in 1879.
- Freedom (melodrama) at the Theatre Royal, Drury Lane, co-written with Augustus Harris 1883

== Family ==
Rowe married the actress Kate Girard in America, but it was not a happy union. She was at one stage consigned to a mental asylum, and they divorced. He may have married again, to Adelaide Arthur.

Rowe had three brothers in Australia:

- Thomas Fawcett Rowe, married Lizzie Royal, daughter of flautist Creed Royal; they had a son, T. W. H. F. Rowe. He died in Queensland and his widow married again in 1871, to actor D. B. O'Hara, best known as "Dan Briggs".
- Sandford Fawcett Rowe in New Zealand, died in Hokitika.
- Charles Fawcett Rowe was a storekeeper in Queensland.

Both Tom and Sandford had stage careers in Australia.
