= William Niblo =

- Born: 1790; Ireland
- Died: 1878 (aged 87–88); New York, NY
- Occupations: Theatre owner, administrator and manager

William Niblo (1790–1878), also known as Billy Niblo, was an American theatre owner. He was the owner of Niblo's Garden. He was born in Ireland and emigrated to the United States at a young age.

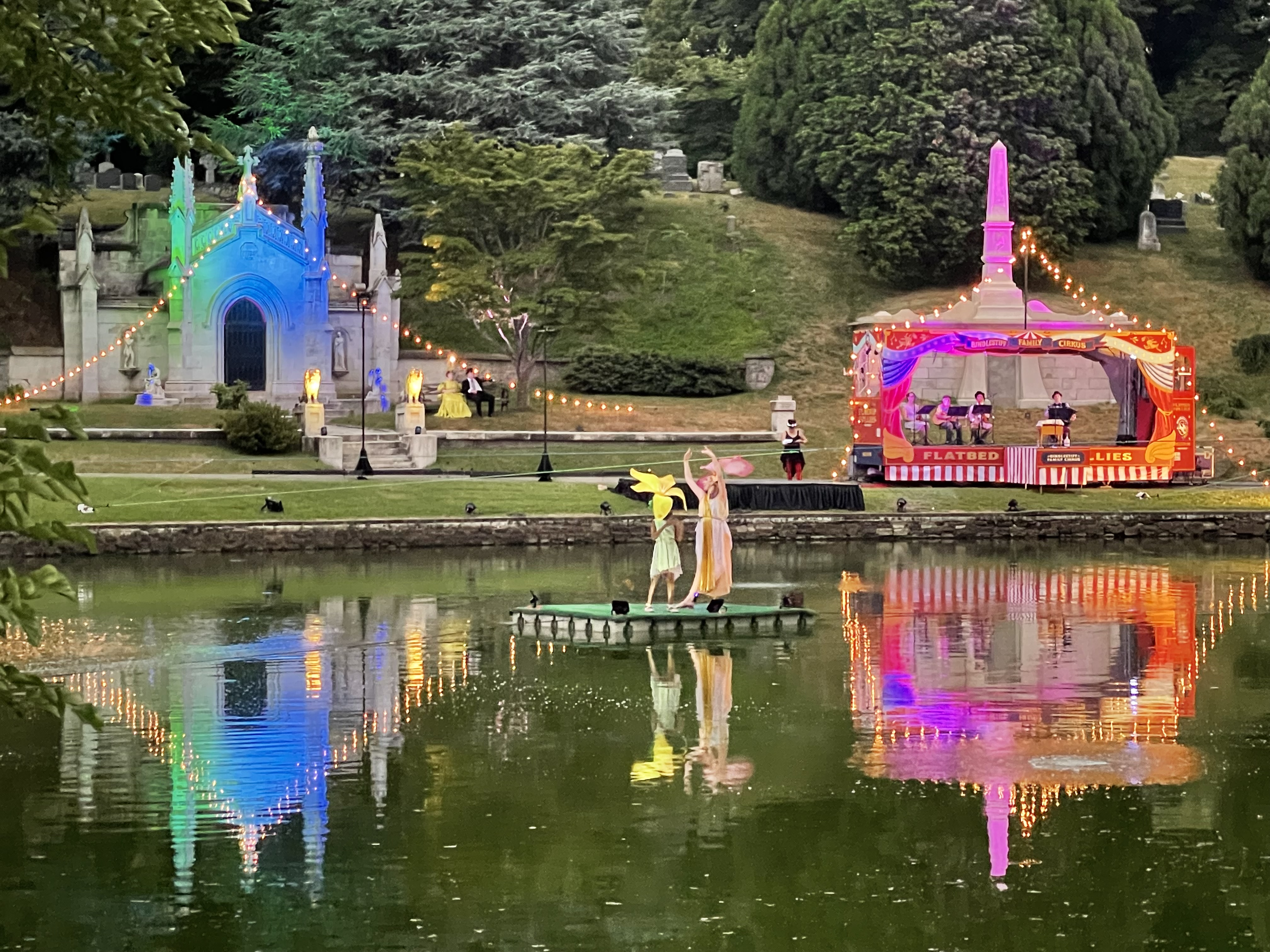
Niblo's mausoleum (left) at Green-Wood Cemetery during performance of "A Night at Niblo’s Garden" July 2022

== Arrival to the United States ==
Niblo arrived from Ireland at a young age. He found work in David King's tavern on Wall Street at Sloat Lane. In 1813, Niblo took possession of the former mansion of Tory sympathizer Frederick Phillipse at Pine and William Streets. In 1814, he turned the mansion into a coffee house.

== The Bank Coffee House ==
The Bank Coffee House was located at the rear of the Bank of New York, and lasted from 1812 to 1830. Adjoining it at the rear was a garden, and the building formerly occupied by the Bank of New York, the first banking institution established in the city. It turned into a gathering place for prominent merchants, which turned into a kind of club. The Bank Coffee House became celebrated for its dinners and dinner parties. Niblo, who was then an active young man, took great pride in his cafe's reputation, and soon it became famous for its suppers given by Benedicts taking leave of their bachelor friends. "William opened a second Bank Coffee House on the corner of Asylum (now West 4th) and Perry Streets in 1825 in the torrent of commercial development of Greenwich Village that ensued after the Yellow Fever epidemic of 1822 drove many Lower Manhattan residents uptown to seek more permanent residences in what was then deemed a vastly more salubrious environment." In 1830 the Bank Coffee House passed into other hands and was torn down. Niblo then went to Broadway and Prince Street, where he opened the gardens which bore his name.

== Niblo's Garden ==
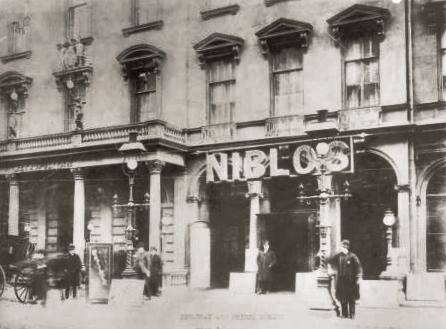
Niblo's Garden c.1887

When Niblo sold the Bank Coffee House, he purchased a large plot of land on the northeast corner of Broadway and Prince Street, where he had a pleasure garden. It used to be called the Columbia Garden. They would have elaborate fireworks shows that would bring large crowds to the entire block. There was a genteel saloon that appealed to bourgeois folks from downtown. "On July 4th, 1828 a theater opened in a pre-existing structure on the site, named Sans Souci, on what was otherwise mostly vacant ground". Many New Yorkers preferred Niblo's garden over the rougher alternatives for entertainment in places such as the Bowery. Women who attempted to go inside the gardens without a man were turned away at the gate.

== Marriage ==
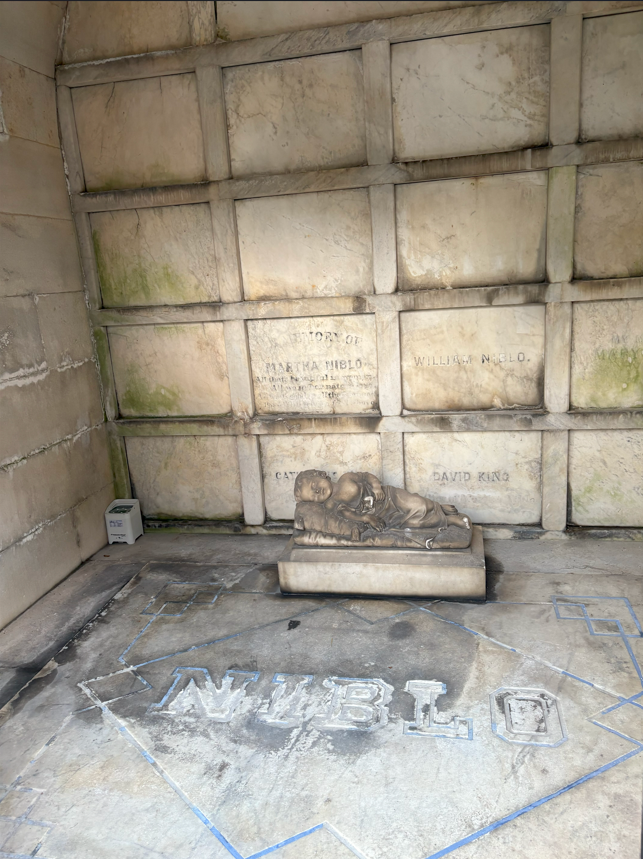
The inside of William and Martha Niblo's mausoleum

Niblo was married 32 years to Martha King Niblo, who died in 1851. When Niblo started out in the US, he worked at a public house as a waiter. When his boss died, he courted his widow, Martha, and married her. He received all of his previous boss's land. It was said at the time that the brains behind the operation was Martha not Niblo. "Mrs. Niblo has had the tact and good sense to keep her little fussy husband in the background; and if she only maintain this position in future, she possibly may select a good manager for her theatre, and stand a fair chance with her rivals for success." "Mrs. Niblo was a shrewd business woman, and while occupying the spot now known as Niblo's Theatre — then Niblo's Garden — she always attended to the details of the establishment in person, examining and auditing all the bills of the concern, and keeping a sharp eye to receipts and expenditures."

Niblo and his wife are interred at Green-Wood Cemetery in Brooklyn, NY. Their mausoleum is opened once a year at Green-Wood Cemetery's 'A Night at Niblo's Garden' event.
