= The Black Crook =

Musical that premiered in New York in 1866

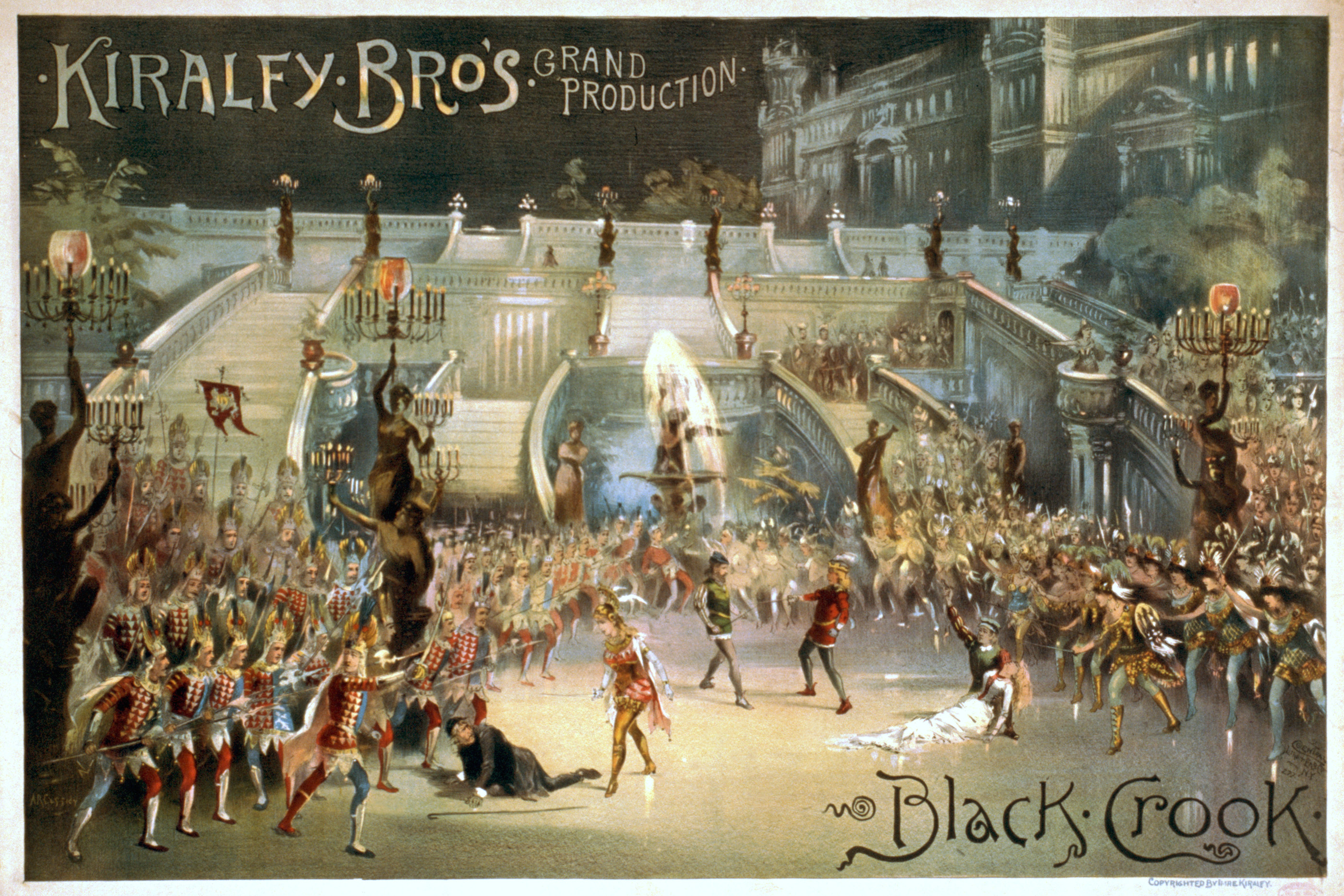
- Finale of The Black Crook
- Music: Thomas Baker; Giuseppe Operti; George Bickwell
- Lyrics: Theodore Kennick
- Book: Charles M. Barras
- Productions: 1866 Broadway; 1870 Broadway revival 1872 West End; 1873 Broadway revival

The Black Crook is a work of musical theatre first produced in New York City with great success in 1866. Many theatre writers have cautiously identified The Black Crook as the first popular piece that conforms to the modern notion of a musical. The book is by Charles M. Barras. The music, selected and arranged by Thomas Baker, consists mostly of adaptations, but it included some new songs composed for the piece, notably "You Naughty, Naughty Men". The story is a Faustian melodramatic romantic comedy, but the production became famous for its spectacular special effects and skimpy costumes.

It opened on September 12, 1866 at the 3,200-seat Niblo's Garden on Broadway in Manhattan and ran for a record-breaking 474 performances. It was then toured extensively for decades and revived on Broadway in 1870–71, 1871–72 and many more times after that. The Black Crook is often considered a prototype of the modern musical in that its popular songs and dances are interspersed throughout a unifying play and performed by the actors.

A British production titled The Black Crook, which opened at the Alhambra Theatre in London on December 23, 1872, was an opera bouffe with a new story based on some of the French source material that influenced the New York version, with new music by Frederic Clay and Georges Jacobi. A silent film version of The Black Crook was produced in 1916.

== Background ==
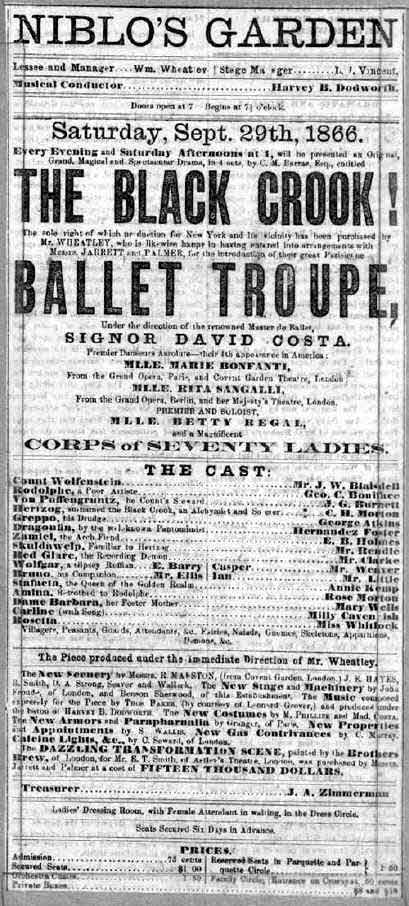
Program from original production

=== Genesis of the piece ===
By 1866, Henry C. Jarrett and Henry Palmer had formed a producing partnership with the idea to import European novelty acts to America. They saw the Féerie La Biche au bois in Paris, and a pantomime at Astley's Amphitheatre in London, and they wanted to incorporate into their American productions the original elements of spectacle that they saw in those shows. They engaged some of the lead dancers from the Paris show and purchased the grand transformation scene from the London piece. They hoped to put together a spectacular production at the New York Academy of Music, but the Academy burned down that summer. Meanwhile, Barras, an actor, wrote a melodrama, The Black Crook, with the intention of touring the piece to feature himself and his wife, dancer Sallie St. Clair. He negotiated the show's New York premiere with William Wheatley, the manager at Niblo's Garden, for a run of 100 performances, which was an extraordinarily long contract for the 1880s. Barras then began to build the scenery and properties in Buffalo, New York.

Jarrett and Palmer approached Wheatley about mounting their unwritten show at Niblo's Garden, but Barras had already booked the venue. Whose idea it was to join the producing forces is not known, but terms were struck under which Barras was given a small flat sum as a royalty and no longer had to pay fees to Wheatley, and Jarrett and Palmer effectively became producers of the New York staging of The Black Crook. Jarrett returned to Europe to gather more ideas, decorations and personnel to change the show from Barras's melodrama into a musical piece more like La Biche au bois. He returned with a collection of stage machinery, scenery, costumes, properties, 100 dancers and actors, and the producers completely replaced Barras's scenic and costume designs, also cutting some of the script to add more dance and spectacle. The new sets were designed by Richard Marston, his first for the Broadway stage. The piece was mounted with unprecedented opulence, and the skimpiness of the costumes created controversy that only served to promote it.

=== Was The Black Crook the first "musical"? ===
In operas, even comic operas with dialogue, like The Magic Flute, the principal singers leave the dancing to the ballet troupe. In Victorian burlesque, music hall, and vaudeville, there is little or no unifying story, just a series of sketches. The Black Crook, with song and dance for the principal actors, built around a romantic story, has been called the first musical comedy. Theatre writer Gerald Bordman described The Black Crook as "generally being looked at as the birth of American musical theatre". Ian MacBey, a theatre critic who writes under the pseudonym David Munro, in his 2008 forward to the 6th edition of Stanley Green's Broadway Musicals: Show by Show wrote that The Black Crook is "usually accepted as the first Broadway musical", and Green begins his history of Broadway musical theatre with that work.

Other critics and theatre writers have dissented from this view: Cecil Smith argued that "calling The Black Crook the first musical comedy is not only incorrect but "fails to suggest any useful assessment of the place of Jarrett and Palmer's extravaganza in the history of the popular musical theatre ... in its first form it contained almost none of the vernacular attributes of book, lyrics, music, and dancing which distinguish musical comedy." Other dissenters are Larry Stempel and Kurt Gänzl, who wrote:

There are pages and pages of earlier shows ... with scores of original music, rather than the patchwork of old and new. … [The libretto was a] hotchpotch. ... The Black Crook was simply a thrown-together imitation of the French opéra-bouffe féerie, lots of nubile teens in short skirts, a bit of melodrama, and – above all – lashings of moving scenery. Anything less "unified" it would be hard to find.

Gänzl considers The Doctor of Alcantara (1862), with music composed by Julius Eichberg and a book and lyrics by Benjamin E Woolf, to be the "first American musical". Gänzl also gives The Naiad Queen (1841) as an example of an earlier musical, concluding that it was only The Black Crook's long run that gave it a reputation as the "first" musical. An apparently similar show from six years earlier, The Seven Sisters (1860), which also had an unusually long run of 253 performances, is now lost and forgotten. It also included special effects and scene changes. The same year that The Black Crook opened, The Black Domino/Between You, Me and the Post was the first show to call itself a "musical comedy".

In the late 1860s, as post-Civil War business boomed, there was a sharp increase in the number of working- and middle-class people in New York, and these more affluent people sought entertainment. Theaters became more popular, and Niblo's Garden, which had formerly hosted opera, began to offer light comedy. The Black Crook was followed by The White Fawn (1868), Le Barbe Blue (1868) and Evangeline (1874). Theatre historian John Kenrick suggests that The Black Crook's greater success, compared with earlier shows, resulted from changes brought about by the Civil War: first, respectable women, having had to work during the war, no longer felt tied to their homes and could attend the theatre, although many did so heavily veiled. This substantially increased the potential audience for popular entertainment. Second, America's railroad system had improved during the war, making it feasible for large productions to tour.

== Synopsis ==
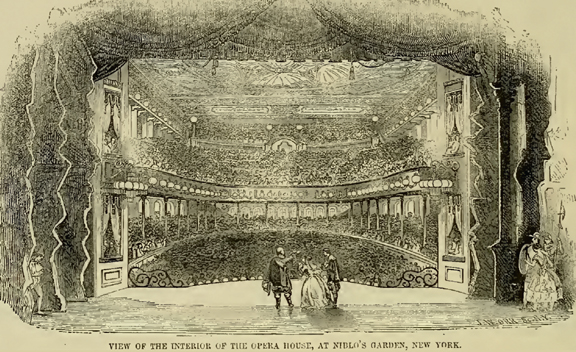
View from the stage

The musical is set in 1600 in the Harz Mountains of Germany. It incorporates elements from Goethe's Faust, Weber's Der Freischütz, and other well-known works.

Evil, wealthy Count Wolfenstein seeks to marry the lovely village girl, Amina. With the help of Amina's scheming foster mother Barbara, the Count arranges for Amina's fiancé, Rodolphe, an impoverished artist, to fall into the hands of Hertzog, an ancient, crook-backed master of black magic (the Black Crook). Hertzog has made a pact with the Devil (Zamiel, "The Arch Fiend"): he can live forever if he provides Zamiel with a fresh soul every New Year's Eve. As the innocent Rodolphe is led to this horrible fate, he discovers a buried treasure and saves the life of a dove. The dove magically transforms into human form as Stalacta, Fairy Queen of the Golden Realm. She rewards Rodolphe for rescuing her by bringing him to fairyland and then reuniting him with his beloved Amina. Her army defeats the Count and his evil forces, demons drag Hertzog into hell, and Amina and Rodolphe live happily ever after.

Comedy was provided by servants, especially J. G. Burnett as von Puffengruntz, and the most popular song was "You Naughty, Naughty Men", for the soubrette Carline.

== Productions ==
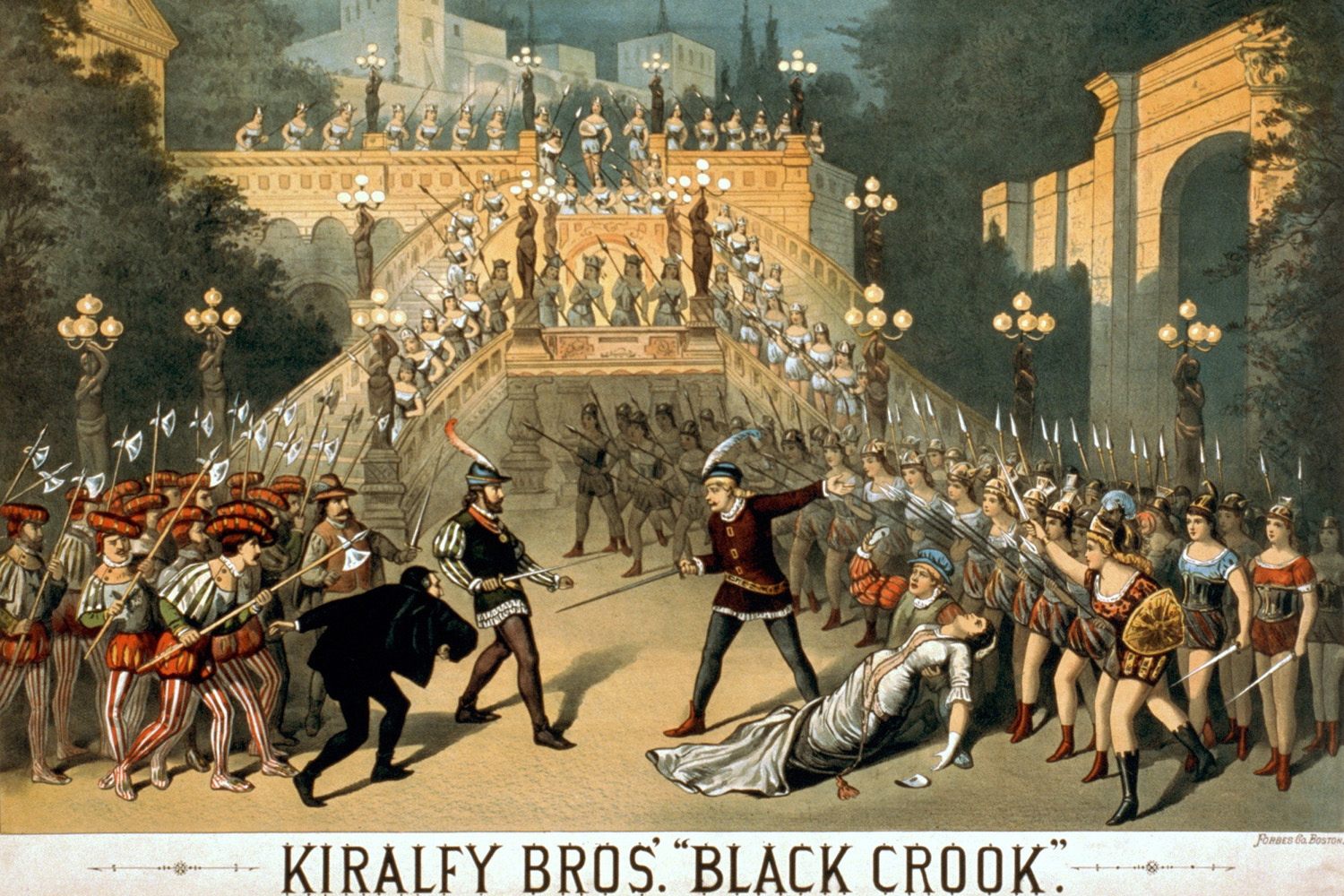
Poster of The Kiralfy Brothers' 1873 revival of the musical.

The original production opened on September 12, 1866 at the 3,200-seat Niblo's Garden. It was a staggering five-and-a-half hours long, but despite its length, it ran for a record-breaking 474 performances, and revenues exceeded a record-shattering one million dollars. Wheatley directed the piece. Barras's script of Faustian fairytale drama and romance included a full musical score consisting of adaptations of existing songs as well as new ones written for the show by various writers, all selected and arranged by Niblo's musical director, Thomas Baker. Popular songs from the show included "You Naughty, Naughty Men", with music credited to George Bickwell and lyrics credited to Theodore Kennick, although the song may really have been adapted from an English song or songs.

The production included state-of-the-art special effects, including a pantomime-style transformation scene that converted a rocky grotto into a fairyland throne room in full view of the audience. The cast included Annie Kemp Bowler, Charles H. Morton, John W. Blaisdell, E. B. Holmes, Rose Morton, Millie Cavendish, J. G. Burnett, and George C. Boniface. The poster announced with great emphasis the presence of a French "Ballet Troupe of Seventy Ladies" choreographed by David Costa. This scantily-clad female dancing chorus in skin-colored tights was a big draw. It was respectable enough for the middle-class audience, but very daring and controversial enough to attract a great deal of press attention. The dance soloists were two Italian ballerinas from the school of Teatro alla Scala of Milan, Marie Bonfanti and Rita Sangalli, who went on to star in further New York productions. The musical was then toured extensively for decades by Barras and others licensed by him and revived on Broadway in 1870–71, 1871–72, and by The Kiralfy Brothers at Niblo's in 1873; and many more times after that; it also had numerous profitable regional productions and was widely burlesqued. One of these, in 1882, was the opening-night attraction at O'Brien's Opera House in Birmingham, Alabama.

A British production titled The Black Crook, which opened at the Alhambra Theatre on December 23, 1872, was an opera bouffe based on La Biche au bois, with new music by Frederic Clay and Georges Jacobi. The author, Harry Paulton, starred as Dandelion, opposite the comedian Kate Santley, who had appeared in the 1871–72 Broadway revival. The plot bore little or no resemblance to Barras's play. The British piece was revived in 1881. A silent film based on Barras's The Black Crook was produced in 1916. A 1954 Sigmund Romberg musical, The Girl in Pink Tights, used as its background a story based loosely on the creation of The Black Crook.

== Musical numbers ==
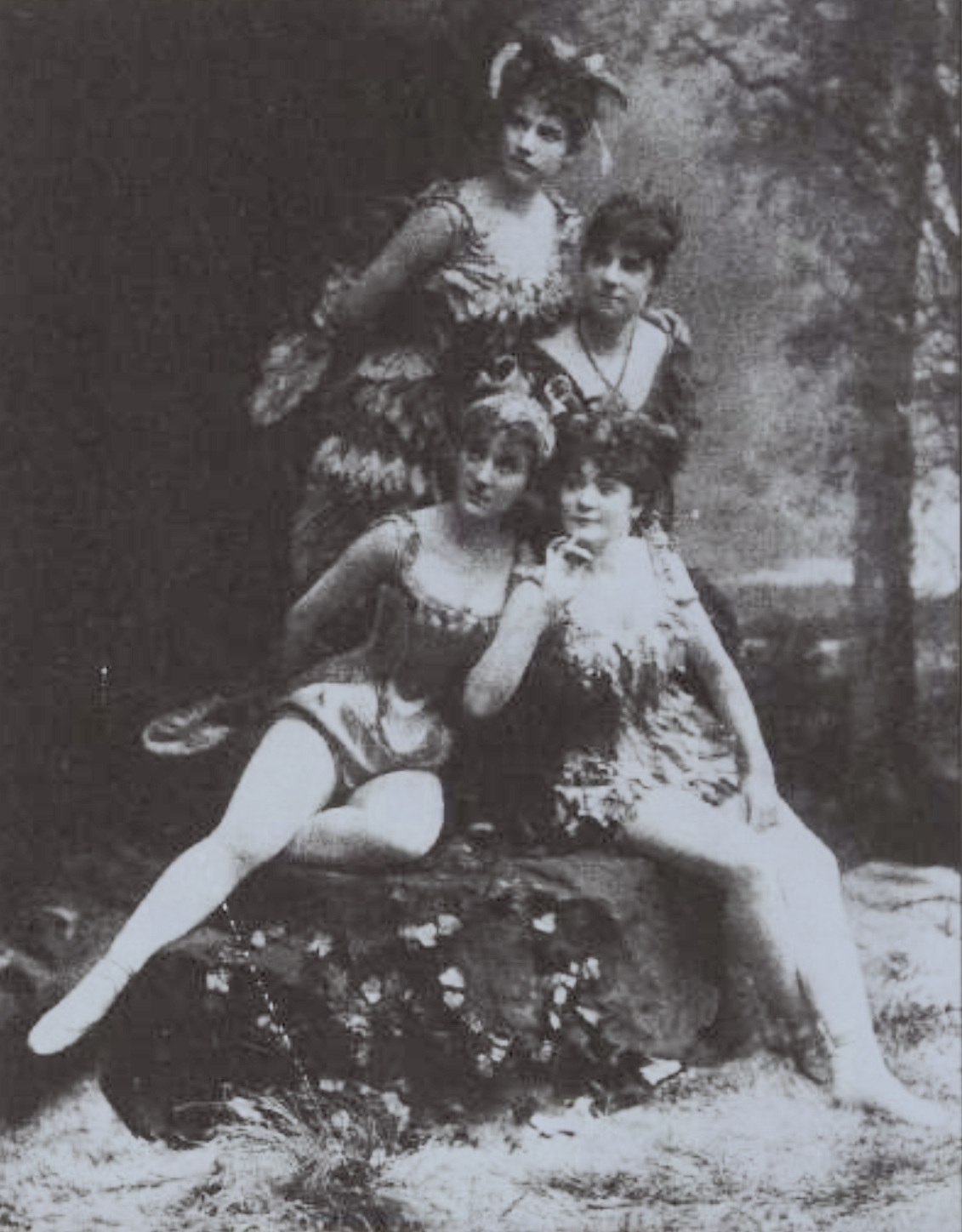
Four coryphées in the 1866 production of The Black Crook.

Act I

- Grand Garland Dance – Ballet and Principals
- Hark, hark, hark! – Villagers' chorus
- Early in the Morning – Carline
- You Naughty, Naughty Men – Carline
- March of the Amazons – Chorus
- Grand Incantation Scene – Herzog

Act II

- Dare I Tell
- Flow On, Silver Stream – Stalacta
- (The) Power of Love – Stalacta
- Rejoice, rejoice, rejoice! – Chorus of Gnomes, Amphibea and Fairies
- Mortal shadows dimly cast – Chorus of Fairies
- Pas de Demons

Act III

- Bal Masque
- Pas Espanoil
- Pas Hongroise
- Dance de Amazons

Act IV

- Dazzling Transformation Scene

== Principal roles ==
- Count Wolfenstein – John W. Blaisdell
- Rodolphe (a poor artist) – George C. Boniface
- Von Puffengruntz (the Count's corpulent steward) – J. G. Burnett
- Hertzog, surnamed the Black Crook (a hideously deformed alchymist and sorcerer) – Charles H. Morton
- Greppo (his drudge) – George Atkins
- Wulfgar (a gypsy ruffian) – E. Barry
- Jan – Frank Little
- Bruno (his companion) – F. Ellis
- Casper (a peasant) – H. Weaver
- Amina (betrothed to Rodolphe) – Rose Morton
- Dame Barbara (her foster-mother) – Mary Wells
- Carline – Millie Cavendish
- Rosetta (a peasant) – C. Whitlock
- Stalacta (Queen of the Golden Realm) – Annie Kemp Bowler
- Zamiel (the Arch-Fiend) – E. B. Holmes
- Skuldawelp (Familiar to Hertzog) – Mr. Rendle
- Redglare (the Recording Demon) – F. Clark
- Villagers, Peasants, Choristers, Guards, Attendants, Fairies, Sprites, Naiads, Submarine Monsters, Gnomes, Skeletons, Apparitions, Demons, Monsters, etc.

== Critical reception ==
The overlong piece survived a rocky opening night, and numerous cuts were subsequently made. According to Doug Reside, a curator at New York Public Library for the Performing Arts:

The New York Herald published an op-ed piece "condemning" the play for the indecency of the costumes and dancing, suggesting that there may have been "in Sodom and Gomorrah ... such a theatre and spectacle on the Broadway of those doomed cities," and urging those "determined to gaze on the indecent and dazzling brilliancy of the Black Crook" to "provide themselves with a piece of smoked glass." However, Joseph Whitton, William Wheatley's business manager, explains in his short history of the play, the editor of The New York Herald was likely aware that such condemnation would promote the show and was rewarding Wheatley for his loyalty to the paper. The moral crusade against the show was taken up by Reverend Charles Smyth who preached a fire and brimstone sermon against it as part of a public lecture series. All of this, of course, simply increased public interest.

Robert C. Allen wrote in his 2000 book, Horrible Prettiness: Burlesque and American Culture, that if Whitton is correct, it was the first such "covert advertising ploy on behalf of the theatre management".

Audience response was divided – some people loved the beauty of spectacle and some people were offended by it. Mark Twain was in the former camp: "Beautiful bare-legged girls … nothing but a wilderness of girls – stacked up, pile on pile, away aloft to the dome of the theatre, diminishing in size and clothing, till the last row, mere children, dangle high up from invisible ropes, arrayed only in camisa. The whole tableau resplendent with columns, scrolls, and a vast ornamental work, wrought in gold, silver, and brilliant colors – all lit up with gorgeous theatrical fires, and witnessed through a great gauzy curtain that counterfeits a soft silver mist! It is the wonders of the Arabian Nights realized." Charles Dickens had an opposite reaction: "[It is] the most preposterous peg to hang ballets on that was ever seen. The people who act in it have not the slightest idea of what it is about". Both awe and outrage fueled the show's increasing popularity until "nobody could hold his own in conversation unless he had seen it".

== Notes ==
Preceded by —	Longest-running Broadway show 1867–1869	Succeeded by Humpty Dumpty
