= Marie Jansen =

American actress and singer

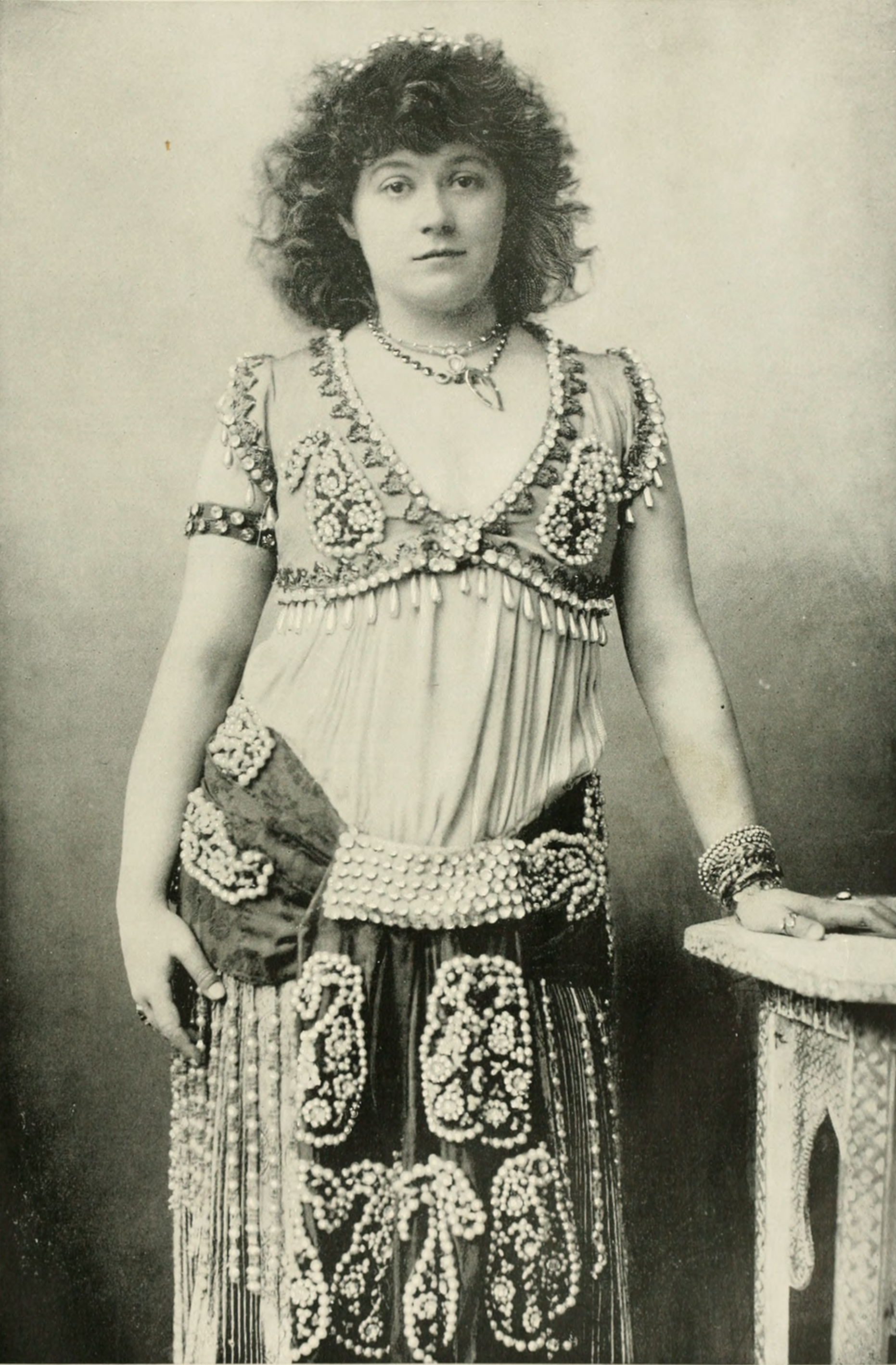
- Jansen as Angelina in The Lion Tamer, c. 1892
- Born: Harriet Mary Johnson; November 18, 1857; Boston, Massachusetts, U.S.
- Died: March 20, 1914 (aged 56); Winthrop, Massachusetts, U.S.
- Occupation: Musical theatre actress

Marie Jansen (born Harriet Mary Johnson; November 18, 1857 – March 20, 1914) was an American musical theatre actress best known for her roles at the end of the 19th century. She starred in a number of successful comic operas, Edwardian musical comedies, and comic plays in New York, Boston, Philadelphia and London during the 1880s and 1890s.

After gaining notice for her role in the American production of Olivette (1880), she became known for her performances in the title role of the original American production of Iolanthe (1882), in the long-running comic opera Erminie (1886), the title roles in Featherbrain (1884) and Nadjy (1888), and her role in The Oolah (1889). Later in her career, she performed in vaudeville and formed her own touring theatre company. Jansen ran into financial difficulties, by the late 1890s, partly due to losses as a producer, that left her in reduced circumstances for the remainder of her life.

== Early life and career ==
Jansen was born in Boston, Massachusetts, where she was adopted as an infant by Benjamin and Harriet Johnson and named Harriet "Hattie" Mary Johnson. Her father was a merchant with the means to send his daughter to the New England Conservatory of Music. While there, she appeared in music hall concerts and caught the eye of the British-American orchestra conductor and composer John Braham, who felt that she had stage presence and later helped her secure a position with the Comley-Barton Opera Company.

Jansen made her professional stage debut at the Park Theatre in Boston on September 13, 1880 in B. E. Woolf's musical comedy, Lawn Tennis. The play made its New York debut a few weeks later at the Bijou Theatre and ran until Christmas Eve. Olivette, the English adaption of Les noces d'Olivette, a comic opera with music by Edmond Audran, debuted at the Bijou on Christmas Day with Jansen as the Waiting Maid to the Countess. In May 1881 Olivette opened at the Boston Globe, with Jansen assuming the role of the Countess, with great success. She next played in The Vicar of Bray and Billee Taylor. Jansen was married in 1881, while starring in Olivette, to James Barton (1854–1910), an actor, theater manager and singer who was a co-founder of the Comley–Barton Opera Company. He was a son of Philip Barton Key II and grandson of Francis Scott Key. They divorced, she said, by the time she introduced the song "Ohé, Mamma" in 1883.

From November 1882 to February 1883, she appeared at the Standard Theatre in the title role in the original American production of the Gilbert and Sullivan comic opera Iolanthe, followed by the title role in an unauthorized production of Patience at the Standard. She transferred to the Fifth Avenue Theatre in March 1883, reprising her role in an unauthorized production of Iolanthe. With the McCaull Comic Opera Company in November 1883, she appeared at Haverley's Theatre, Philadelphia, in the title role of the Johann Strauss operetta Prinz Methusalem.

== Peak years ==
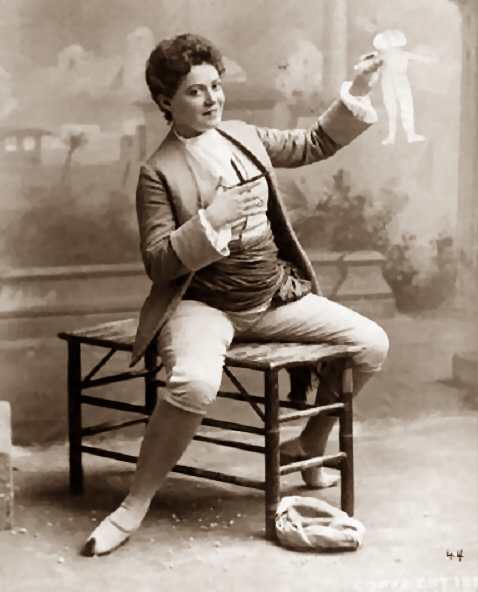
Marie Jansen as Tourouloupi in The Oolah, c. 1889

In December 1883, also at Haverley's, she scored a hit in the English version of the Carl Millöcker operetta Der Bettelstudent (The Beggar Student). This led to Rudolph Aronson choosing her, early in 1884, to sing at New York's Casino Theatre. In the spring of 1884 Charles Wyndham signed Jansen to create, at London's Criterion Theatre, the lead role, Mrs. Coney, in Featherbrain, from the French play La Téte de Linotte by Théodore Barrière and Edmond Gondinet. Featherbrain had a successful run of eight months.

Jansen played the title role in a four-month run at the Boston Museum of the comic opera Fantine, by Firmin Bernicat and André Messager that was adapted by B. E. Woolf and R. M. Field (manager of the Boston Museum), with additional music supplied by Woolf. She next sang the role of Phyllis in Iolanthe. In May 1885, with the McCaull Comic Opera Company, Jansen played Rosetta in Sydney Rosenfeld's adaptation of the Millöcker comic opera Der schwarze Husar (The Black Hussars). A year later at the Casino Theatre, she played Javotte in Erminie, the hit comic opera composed by Edward Jakobowski. When she joined the cast of Erminie, Aronson added a song for her, Sunday after Three, My Sweetheart Comes to Me, that he adapted from an old German tune. In May 1888, again at the Casino, Jansen created for the American stage the title role in Nadjy, adapted by Alfred Murray from the Francis Chassaigne operetta, Les noces improvises. Jansen performed the role after only five days rehearsal following Sadie Martinot's last minute departure over a creative dispute. Nadjy went on to have a run of 256 performances.

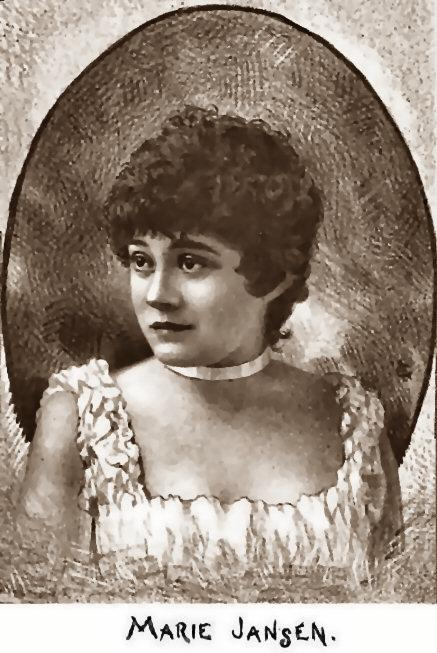
Marie Jansen in Folio Magazine, 1885

In May 1889 Jansen played Tourouloupi, the wife of Cadi, in The Oolah, the first of three successful comic operas she performed in with Francis Wilson's Opera Company at the old Broadway Theatre on 41st Street, New York. The Oolah, by Sydney Aronson and Charles Lecocq, was memorable in part for Jansen's rendition of the song, "Be Good", which some considered too suggestive. She was Tessa in Wilson's 1890 Philadelphia production of The Gondoliers. In August 1890 she was Lazuli, a traveling perfume peddler, to Wilson's King Anso, in The Merry Monarch, by J. Cheever Goodwin and composers Woolson Morse and Emmanuel Chabrier, adapted from L'étoile by Chabrier. Jansen next played Angelina, a circus equestrian, opposite Wilson, in The Lion Tamer, opening in December 1891, with book and lyrics by Goodwin, music by Richard Stahl and orchestrations by John Philip Sousa. In 1892, she left Wilson's company and appeared in Rosedale, by Lester Wallack, in Boston. In 1893 Jansen began a several-years-long tour at Boston's Howard Athenaeum as Trixie Hazelmere the Queen of the Vaudevilles in Delmonico's at Six, a comic play written specifically for her by Glen MacDonough. Over the season of 1897–98 she played Pearl Dodo in a musical farce by Frank Tannehill, Jr., entitled The Nancy Hanks, a success in which she and Tannehill "succeeded in bringing down the house on several occasions."

== Later years ==
A subsequent venture into vaudeville with her own company failed due to Jansen's unsophisticated approach towards finances, and by 1904 Jansen was forced into bankruptcy. Jansen was thought to have earned over her career an estimated $500,000, but by the time of her bankruptcy she was unable to pay a $7 a-week bill for lodging while working as seamstress and occasionally appearing on stage in minor roles. Reportedly because of her drinking, Jansen's relationship with her twice widowed father and Lulu, his third wife, soured around 1901. As a result, after Benjamin Johnson's death in January 1906, Jansen received only $500 from his $30,000 estate, with the bulk of the funds going to his widow. Jansen sued but eventually failed to convince a Boston court that her stepmother had an undue influence over her father in drafting his final will.

Jansen's last known stage appearance came in the fall of 1908 at New York's Olympic Theatre as a principal performer in comedian Edmond "The Wise Guy" Hayes' vaudeville show, Mardi Gras Beauties. She died in March 1914 at Winthrop, Massachusetts, aged 56.
