= Parsons Theatre =

Theatre in Hartford

Coordinates: 41.7655°N 72.6718°W

Parsons Theatre, also given as Parsons' Theatre, was a theatre located in Hartford, Connecticut, at 66 Prospect Street at the interaction of Prospect Street, Central Row, and American Row. Construction began on the theatre in 1895 and it opened in 1896. It was a venue for plays and concerts until it closed in 1931 during the Great Depression. The theatre was demolished five years later.

== History ==
Parsons Theatre' was designed by the architecture firm of J. B. McElfatrick & Sons and had a seating capacity of 1,817 people. The theatre was named for its initial proprietor and manager, Herbert C. Parsons. Parsons oversaw construction of the theatre which began in 1895.

Parsons Theatre opened on April 1, 1896 with a performance of Woolson Morse and J. Cheever Goodwin's musical Dr. Synax that was given by DeWolf Hopper and his theatre troupe. The theatre gained a reputation as "one of the best of the high-class theatres in the eastern states" and attracted the best New York productions when they toured and top entertainers. The theatre was notably the last stop for the New York Philharmonic's 1910-1911 tour with conductor Gustav Mahler; concluding the tour with a concert on February 16, 1911.

In 1915 the theatre was partially damaged by fire, and it closed for renovations until re-opening in October 1915. The Shubert family operated the theatre during much of the 1920s. The theatre suffered financially during the Great Depression and it closed its doors in 1931. It was demolished in 1936.
