= The Oolah =

1889 comic opera

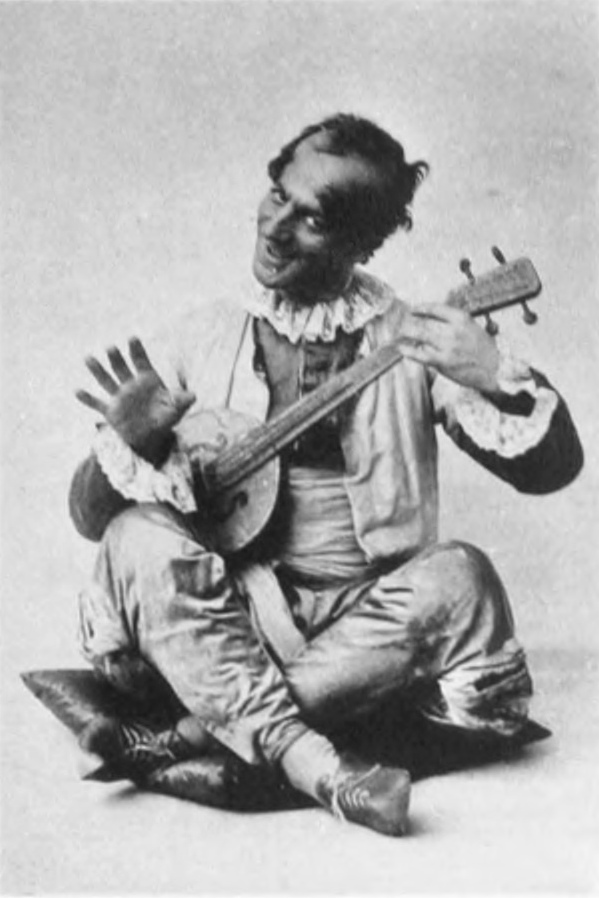
- Francis Wilson as the Oolah
- Original language: French (liberally adapted to English)
- Written by: Charles Lecocq's La Jolie Persane, English libretto by Sydney Rosenfeld and J. Cheever Goodwin
- Genre: comic opera
- Setting: Persia

Premiere
- Date: 13 May 1889
- Place: Broadway Theatre (41st Street)

The Oolah is an 1889 comic opera which starred Francis Wilson and Marie Jansen on Broadway.

== Production ==
The opera is an adaptation of Charles Lecocq's La Jolie Persane, with a liberal adaptation of the libretto by Sydney Rosenfeld, and script doctoring by J. Cheever Goodwin.

Wilson originally planned to debut the play at the Casino Theatre (where Wilson had been a performer), but other obligations for that venue and contractual disputes caused delay and eventual failure. Thus, The Oolah opened at the former Broadway Theatre on 41st Street on May 13, 1889. The show marked Wilson's debut as a manager of his own company and as a Broadway star.

The opening night did not go very well. Wilson had risked much of his money on the production, and was distraught. Rosenfeld refused to make changes without a new contract and a cut of the profits. This led to Godwin's immediate work to revise the text (including expanding Wilson's parts, as he was clearly an audience favorite), and to radical changes in the music, including three new songs from Woolson Morse, and two from John Braham, and likely the scoring by Sousa mentioned below. One periodical commenting on the revisions noted Steele MacKaye's observation that "Plays are not written; they are rewritten," and concluded that "this seems to apply to comic operas especially." Rosenfeld later sued Wilson over song rights.

In any event, the changes worked, and the play had a successful run of 154 performances over 22 weeks, closing on October 12, and then went on tour. A letter opener souvenir was given out to ticket holders at the 100th performance, a number of which are still extant. The next season Wilson and Jansen had success with another French adaptation, The Merry Monarch.

== Sousa's role ==
John Philip Sousa likely orchestrated the music for Wilson, though this was not advertised. Wilson did not say in his autobiography who provided "the infusion of some whistlish and hummable melodies that set the audience in fine humor and their feet to keeping time," or who prepared "the orchestral arrangement to which had just come to hand as a performance began." Yet, Wilson claimed that some of the new music "was written by a composer while he was being whirled away to Chicago on the Pennsylvania 'Limited' train... he handed the manuscript to messenger awaiting him at Pittsburg, who hurried back to New York and placed it in our hands." And then it was performed the next evening.

== Songs ==
The popular songs of the show included "A Little Peach in an Orchard Grew" or "Listen to My Tale of Woe", a Wilson-Jansen duet which had previously been used in Nadjy. The lyrics which originated from Eugene Field and music and alterations by Hubbard T. Smith. Other popular songs included "Nobody Knows", as well as "Be Good", which Jansen performed, and was considered too suggestive by some.

== Plot ==
The play is set in Persia, where it is claimed that the marriage laws require a divorced wife who wishes to return to a husband must first marry another man, and then divorce that second spouse. "The Oolah" is the person who performs that role. However, the Oolah seeks to retire from his job to marry for real, yet he has one more professional marriage to accomplish first.

The Oolah's most popular comedic lines included "think twice about divorcing once", and "I have been married a hundred and fifteen times and not once deceived. I have known men who have been married but once, but who were deceived a hundred and fifteen times."

== Original Broadway cast ==
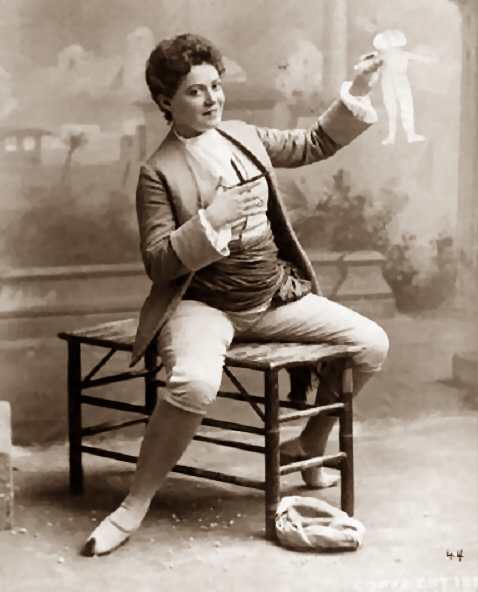
Marie Jansen as Tourouloupi

- Boolahgoolah, the Oolah – Francis Wilson
- The Prince of Eriven – Hubert Wilke
- Akhalzakek – Charles Plunkett
- Nejef – Thomas H. Persse
- The Cadi – Harry MacDonough
- The Fig Dealer – Benjamin F. Johnson
- The Barber – Carlo Segelini
- The Tailor – W. Carr
- The Watchman – Henry Hoffman
- The Baker – H. Ledbury
- Darinoora – Laura Moore
- Bampoora – Elma Delaro
- Altoora – Ida Fitzhugh
- Shimrana – Ida Kissing
- Velis – Josie Winner
- Tourouloupi – Marie Jansen
