= The Lucky Star =

Comic opera by Ivan Caryll

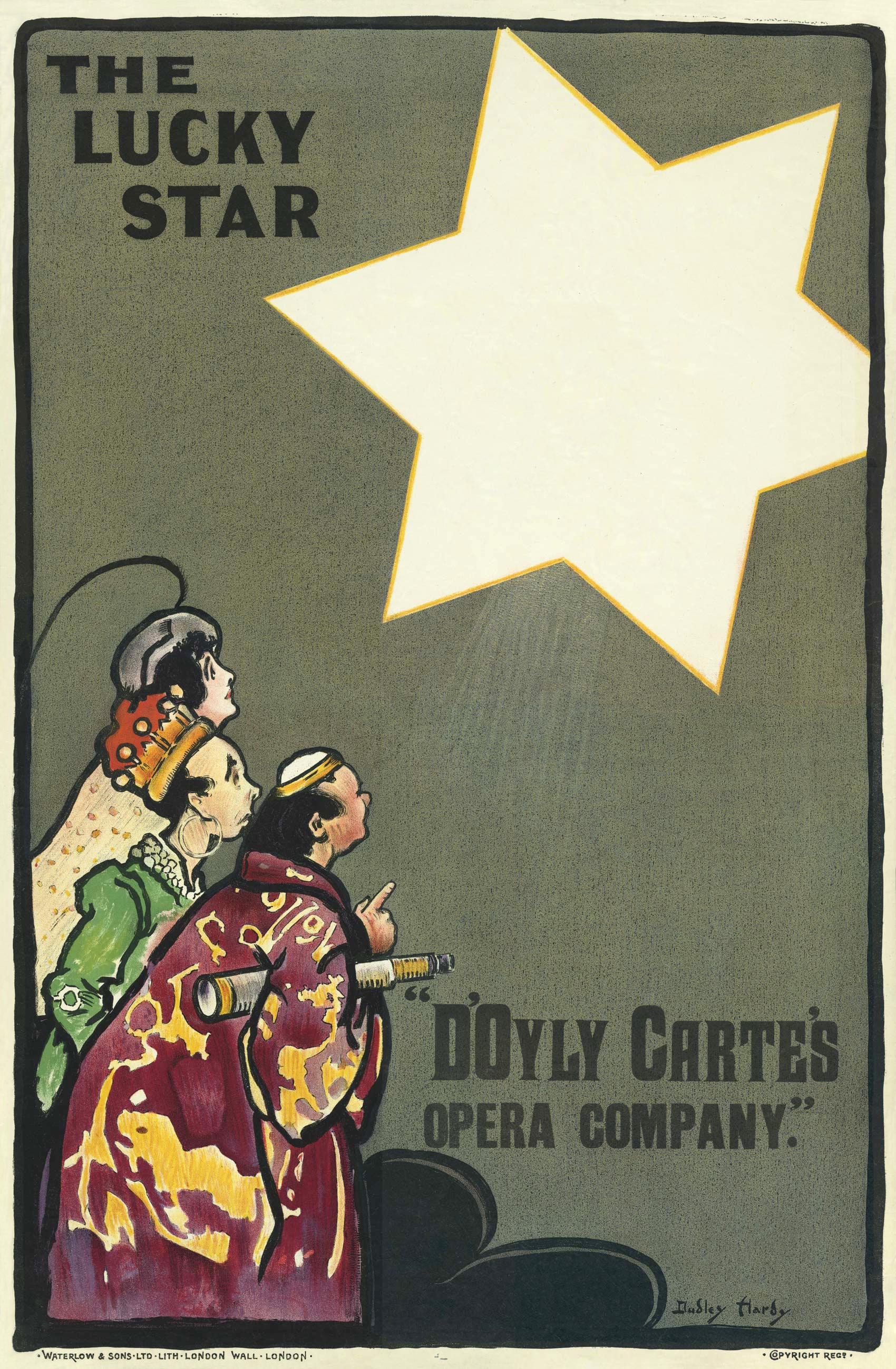
Poster for original production by Dudley Hardy

Scene from The Lucky Star

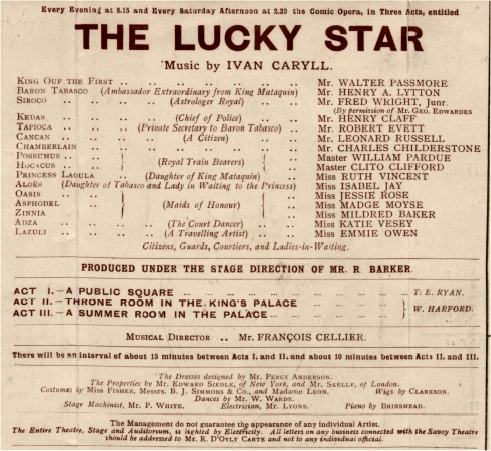
Programme from the original production

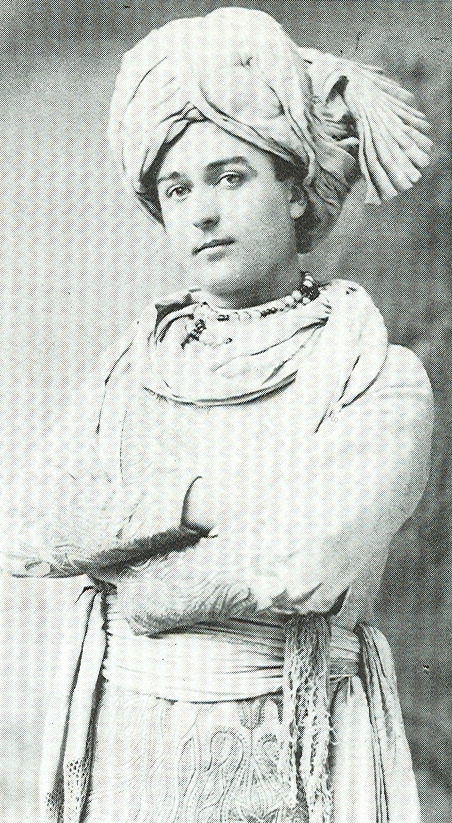
Evett as Tapioca

The Lucky Star is a comic opera, in three acts, composed by Ivan Caryll, with dialogue by Charles H. Brookfield (revised by Helen Lenoir) and lyrics by Adrian Ross and Aubrey Hopwood. It was produced by the D'Oyly Carte Opera Company and opened at the Savoy Theatre on 7 January 1899 for a run of 143 performances.

The opera starred the usual Savoy Theatre cast from that period, including Walter Passmore, Henry Lytton, Robert Evett, Ruth Vincent, Emmie Owen and Isabel Jay. Direction was by Richard Barker, choreography was by Willie Warde, and costumes were designed by Percy Anderson.

== Background ==
The opera is based on L'étoile, written in 1877 by Eugène Leterrier and Albert Vanloo, with additional material by Paul Verlaine and music by Emmanuel Chabrier. It is also based on The Merry Monarch, an American translation of L'étoile by J. Cheever Goodwin with music by Woolson Morse, produced in 1890. Caryll used a small amount of Chabrier's music in the first act finale.

The Lucky Star was the only Savoy Opera where a woman plays a man's part. The piece has many other characteristics of Edwardian musical comedy, which had become popular on the London stage in the 1890s – broader comedy, a thin romance, bright tunes, comedians, a chorus of pretty girls, some risqué situations, a "coon" song, songs regarding news of the day, separate authors of dialogue and lyrics, and a star, Walter Passmore. This half-musical, half-comic opera, did not appeal strongly to the Savoy Theatre's audiences and was unable to achieve a long run.

== Synopsis ==
King Ouf is a superstitious monarch. The King is informed by his astrologer Siroco that his destiny is linked with that of an itinerant painter named Lazuli, who is in love with the King's intended bride, the Princess Laoula. Siroco's astrological charts reveal that Lazuli's death will result in the King's. The King decrees that Siroco will be executed moments after the King's death, and so both have an interest in keeping Lazuli alive.

== Roles ==
- King Ouf the First (comic baritone) – Walter Passmore
- The Baron Tabasco, Ambassador-Extraordinary from King Mataquin (baritone) – Henry Lytton
- Siroco, the Astrologer Royal – Sydney Paxton (replaced by Fred Wright, Jr.)
- Tapioca, Private Secretary to Baron Tabasco (tenor) – Robert Evett
- Kedas, a Police officer – Frank Manning
- Cancan, a Citizen – Leonard Russell
- Chamberlain – Charles Childerstone
- Princess Laoula, Daughter of King Mataquin (soprano) – Ruth Vincent
- Aloës, Daughter of Tabasco and Lady-in-Waiting to the Princess (soprano) – Isabel Jay
- Maids of Honour: Oasis, Asphodel and Zinnia – Jessie Rose, Madge Moyse and Mildred Baker
- Adza, the Court Dancer – Katie Vesey
- Lazuli, a Travelling Painter (mezzo-soprano, a woman portraying a man) – Emmie Owen
- Citizens, Guards, Courtiers, and Ladies-in-Waiting.

== Musical numbers ==
- Overture

Act I - A Public Square

- No. 1 - Chorus - "Night is done, but it is not day, only a twilight, quiet and grey"
- No. 2 - Laoula, Aloës, Tabasco & Tapioca - "Hush! hark! is anyone near?"
- No. 3 - Laoula - "When I was a child of three, heigh-ho!"
- No. 4 - Lazuli - "Say little star, when the soft summer glow trembles and dies out of the skies"
- No. 5 - Laoula, Aloës, & Lazuli - "Of our disguise advantage take"
- No. 6 - Chorus - "Bring on our King"
- No. 6a - King & Chorus - "I'm a king in everything"
- No. 7 - Finale Act I - "Young man, you have dared to strike the King!"

Act II - Throne-Room in the King's Palace

- No. 8 - Chorus, with Oasis & Asphodel - "Lolling in sinuous feminine fashion"
- No. 9 - Lazuli & Chorus - "There was a minstrel gay"
- No. 10 - King, Siroco, Lazuli, Tabasco & Tapioca - "It's the husband, harsh and hated"
- No. 11 - Chorus - Entrance of the Ambassador - "In a courtly train let us welcome with dutiful homage"
- No. 12 - Lazuli, Laoula & King - "Together, darling, let us roam, with staff and scrip and pocket-comb"
- No. 13 - King & Chorus - "In an African land, that chiefly was sand, an Ostrich went his way"
- No. 14 - Finale Act II - "It's a shot! Then a lot! Did they pot him, yes or not?"

Act III - A Summer-Room in the Palace

- No. 15 - Chorus - "When the tramp, tramp, tramp of our military march is heard"
- No. 16 - Tapioca - "Dreaming in the dark, your vision comes upon my lonely slumber"
- No. 17 - King & "Coons" - "Merry little darkie's very kind remark is: 'Life in the old dog yet!'"
- No. 18 - Laoula & Lazuli - "There lived in a cage two turtle doves, in happy contentment of mind"
- No. 19 - Chorus - "In courtly train, let us welcome, with dutiful homage"
- No. 20 - Finale Act III - "Let us march away, brave and gay our display"

== Reception ==
The Times commented, "One portion of a single finale is all that remains of Chabrier's work in the production. There is in the book of words a wholly unnecessary announcement to the effect that this portion is by a different hand from the rest; the 'join' is quite unmistakable, for during the too-short extract from the original score the music suddenly becomes humorous, charming and brilliantly melodious, besides being orchestrated in a fresh and musicianly way." The Manchester Guardian praised Caryll's music for its "tuneful dance melodies … while the concerted pieces are marked by abundant piquancy and animation." Passmore, the paper said, "maintains the spirit of fun at fever heat whenever he is upon the stage." Reviewing the touring production later in the same year, the paper commented on the libretto: "The Gilbertian kind of comic opera is not the worst kind. Though rather irritating with its unchanging tone of frigid banter, it is ambrosia compared with the stuff here offered by Messrs Leterrier, Vanloo, Goodwin, Morse, Brockfield, Ross, Hopwood and Co." The Observer commented that the piece was of a different, and inferior, class to the customary Savoy Operas, but was nonetheless good of its kind.
