= Doctor Syntax =

Doctor Syntax may refer to:

- Dr. Syntax, a comic character created by William Combe and the cartoonist Thomas Rowlandson.
- Doctor Syntax (horse) (1811–1838), British Thoroughbred racehorse and sire
- Doctor Syntax (album), a 2002 album by a Scottish musician Edwyn Collins
- Dr. Syntax (play), 1894 play
