= Fifth Avenue Theatre =

Former theatre in Manhattan, New York

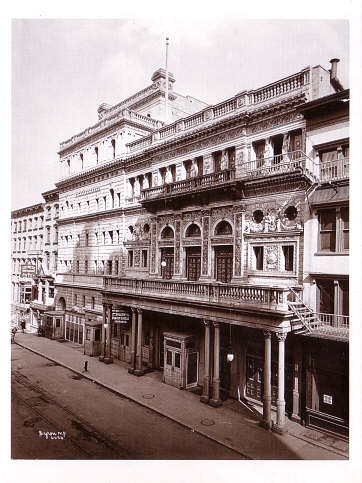
- The theatre in 1899
- Interactive map of the Fifth Avenue Theatre area

General information
- Location: Manhattan, New York City, 31 West 28th St. and 1185 Broadway
- Opened: 1868
- Demolished: 1939

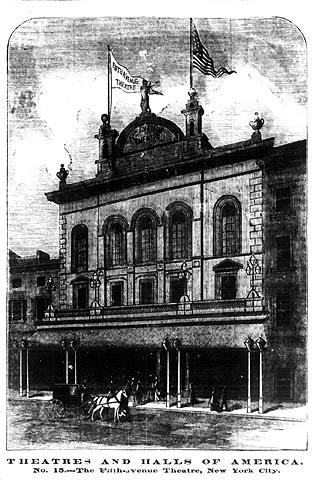
Illustration of the Fifth Avenue Theatre, 1874

The Fifth Avenue Theatre was a Broadway theatre in Manhattan, New York City, United States, at 31 West 28th Street and Broadway (1185 Broadway). It was demolished in 1939.

Built in 1868, it was managed by Augustin Daly in the mid-1870s. In 1877, it became the first air-conditioned theatre in the world. In 1879, it presented the world premiere of The Pirates of Penzance by Gilbert and Sullivan and the New York D'Oyly Carte Opera Company premiere of H.M.S. Pinafore, followed by other Gilbert and Sullivan operas throughout the 1880s. The theatre continued to present both plays and musicals through the end of the century. At the beginning of the 20th century, the theatre presented English classics and then vaudeville, and later films, as well as plays and musicals.

== History ==
The theatre was built in 1868 and was originally named Gilsey's Apollo Hall. In 1870 it was renamed the St. James Theatre. Its capacity was approximately 1,530 seats. In its early years, it offered lectures in the upstairs hall and musical entertainment in the main auditorium. When Augustin Daly's former Fifth Avenue Theatre (on 24th Street) burned down in 1873, Daly moved his company to the St. James, remodeled it and renamed it the New Fifth Avenue Theatre, where he continued as proprietor until 1877.

The 1873 financial panic hurt business at the theatre in Daly's early years, but his 1875 production of The Big Bonanza was a big success, as was his production of Lemons. Mary Anderson and Helena Modjeska made their New York debuts at the theatre. Eleonora Duse also made her American debut at the theatre in 1893 in The Lady of the Camellias.

In 1877, a ventilation system was introduced at the theatre that blew air over blocks of ice, making it the world's first air-conditioned theatre. John T. Ford managed the theatre for some years thereafter, naming it the Fifth Avenue Theatre. The theatre was destroyed by fire in 1891 and rebuilt by architect Francis Hatch Kimball in highly ornate neoclassical style, opening in May 1892. The ornate entrance of the new structure faced Broadway for a time, but later the Fifth Avenue entrance was used as the main entrance. Henry Miner managed the theatre in the 1890s, and F. F. Proctor took control in 1900. He presented mainly vaudeville there and, by 1915, was showing motion pictures. The theatre presented burlesque in the 1930s and, in its declining years, films. It was demolished in 1939.

== Productions ==
Among the theatre's early successes was Jezebel, a play by Dion Boucicault in 1871. One of Daly's first productions at the theatre was another Boucicault play, The Heart of Mid-Lothian, and another was the New York premiere of Shakespeare's Love's Labour's Lost in 1874, which was a flop. His production of W. S. Gilbert's play Charity the same year, however, was a success, although the playwright objected to Daly's changes. The next year, Daly's own play The Big Bonanza was a sensation, introducing John Drew in his New York début. Also in 1875 came the New York premiere of the hit London play Our Boys by H. J. Byron, in which Georgiana Drew first appeared in New York. The first night of Richard Brinsley Sheridan's The School for Scandal on December 5, 1876, with Charles Coghlan, was overshadowed by the disastrous Brooklyn Theater Fire. In 1877, another huge London hit, The Chimes of Normandy, had its New York premiere at the theatre. Daly was losing money at the theatre and left by 1878 to take over another New York theatre, which had been Banvard's Museum, naming it Daly's Theatre.

The Fifth Avenue Theatre was soon leased to John T. Ford, who presented, in cooperation with the D'Oyly Carte Opera Company, the first official U.S. productions of Gilbert and Sullivan operas, beginning with H.M.S. Pinafore and the world premiere of The Pirates of Penzance in 1879, and several other Savoy operas continuing through the 1880s. In 1887, the theatre presented The Begum by Reginald De Koven. The theatre was rebuilt after a fire in 1891, and in 1894, it presented European plays, Hannele by Gerhart Hauptmann and Gismonda by Victorien Sardou. In 1896, productions included Pamela Nubile by Carlo Goldoni, The Speculator by George Broadhurst, and a musical, Lost, Strayed or Stolen, by J. Cheever Goodwin and Woolson Morse. Among the plays presented in 1897 were A Superfluous Husband by Clyde Fitch and Leo Ditrichstein, Dr. Claudius by F. Marion Crawford, Harry St. Maur, a revival of Sardou's Divorçons, A Southern Romance by Leo Ditrichstein, The Devil's Disciple by George Bernard Shaw, Alexandra by Richard Voss and The Royal Box by Charles Francis Coghlan. Notable works presented in 1898 included Henrik Ibsen's drama Hedda Gabler and the hit London musical A Runaway Girl, with music by Ivan Caryll and Lionel Monckton. 1899 saw a John Philip Sousa musical, The Charlatan, and the comic play Becky Sharp by Langdon Mitchell.

The theatre began the new century with three Shakespeare plays, Macbeth, Twelfth Night and Much Ado About Nothing. Other productions in 1900 were Mary Stuart by Friedrich Schiller and Oliver Goldsmith by Augustus Thomas. After this, the theatre presented mostly vaudeville, but it still produced a few plays and musicals. In 1903, for example, the theatre presented Who Is Brown? by Frank Wyatt. 1905 productions included Zorah by Edwin Arden and a version of Oliver Twist by J. Comyns Carr. Another hit London musical, King of Cadonia, with music by Sidney Jones, played at the theatre in 1910. The theatre began to show films during World War I. In later years, few plays were produced at the theatre. They included The Wisecrackers by Gilbert Seldes (1925) and Bertha, the Sewing Machine Girl by Charles Foster (1935).
