= Lost, Strayed or Stolen =

Musical comedy by Woolson Morse and J. Cheever Goodwin

Lost, Strayed or Stolen is a musical comedy in four acts with music by Woolson Morse and words by J. Cheever Goodwin, adapted from the French farce Le baptême du petit Oscar by Eugène Grangé and Victor Bernard. The story concerns a missing child and its nursemaid, three competing potential godfathers and an opera diva.

It was produced at the Fifth Avenue Theatre in New York City on September 16, 1896, and ran with success. It was directed by Ben Teal, the musical director was John McGhie and dances in act 4 were arranged by Rose Becket. The show was made into a 1908 film of the same name.

== Background ==
One of the first shows created for the Theatrical Syndicate, it had its premiere in Chicago, Illinois, on June 15, 1896. Jennie Goldthwaite was originally scheduled to play the female lead, Rose D'Ete, but she became indisposed and was relieved by Georgia Caine, who had been assigned the role of the nursemaid. After Caine replaced Goldthwaite, Florence Thornton was hired to play the nursemaid.

Subsequent to its New York run, the musical toured, opening at the Boston Theatre, on April 12, 1897. It eventually returned to New York at the Harlem Opera House in December 1897. It also played in London, at the Duke of York's Theatre in 1897, featuring Decima Moore, with dances by John D'Auban.

== Plot ==
=== Act 1, in Bidart's parlor salesrooms ===
The musical opens with the christening of a baby boy, son of Bidart, a Parisian florist. He has invited a relative to be the godfather. Unknown to him, his wife and mother-in-law have also invited people to be the godfather. To further complicate matters, the child's nurse, while strolling in the park with the baby, was speaking to an admirer while a policeman took the child away, and now returns tearfully revealing the child is missing. The act ends with all going to search for the child.

=== Act 2, in the 22nd barracks at Pepinière ===
Since the nursemaid was speaking to a policeman, Bidart and company have arrived at the barracks of the 22nd Regiment. Circumstances force Bidart and his party to wear uniforms, where they are mistaken for undisciplined members of the regiment. Unseen, one of the policemen returns the baby to the nursemaid and they depart. This occurs before Bidart and party realize, and they continue their search. Meanwhile, one of the potential godfathers drops out.

=== Act 3, in the boudoir of Rose d'Ete ===
The nursemaid is the employee of Rose d'Ete, a famous Parision opera bouffe prima donna, who supposedly now has the child. When Bidart and his party enter to search for the baby, their identities are confused with those of Rose d'Ete's paramour; when the paramour arrives they pretend they are workmen. They finally learn that the baby has been taken back to the park where he was originally lost. The second of the potential godfathers drops out.

=== Act 4, in a corner of the gardens of the Luxembourg ===
The child has been traced to the gardens of Luxembourg. While Bidart searches, the remaining potential godfather gets into trouble by claiming and endeavoring to kidnap a baby and pretend it is the missing one. The climax occurs at the entrance of the christening procession: to the surprise of the three potential godfathers, the baby has been found and christened in their absence.

== Cast ==
- Bidart, a florist: Louis Harrison
- Chachignon, from the south of France: M. A. Kennedy
- Courte Botte de Roquencourt, of the ancien régime: Joseph Herbert
- Galampois, the family notary: Claude Brooke
- Jolivet, a poor relative: John Gilroy
- Honorine Girardin, the godmother: Fannie Bulkeley
- Catherine, a wet nurse: Rose Beaudet
- Pauline: Caroline Leigh
- Gaston de Champignol, an aristocratic conscript: Cyril Scott
- Captain Latour, a military martinet: Edward Wilks
- Corporal Bridoux, a victim of circumstances: Dan Packard
- Achille, a rebellious recruit: David Torence
- Rose D'Ete, opera bouffe prima donna: Georgia Caine
- Julie, lady's maid to Rose: Florence Thornton
- Cerise, a soubrette
- Mlle. Doucy, a contralto
- Esteban Pacheco, a jealous Cuban: Henry Bergman
- Papa Pantin, a Napoleonic veteran: Edward Wilks
- Papa Bigot, a companion-at-arms: Max Rosen
- Renaud, a gendarme: Horace Sparks
- Françoise, a downtrodden nursemaid: Irene Verona
- Ninette, fond of the military: Sue Meade
- Louise, another nursemaid: Emma Janvier

== Songs ==
- A Kiss in the Dark
- Buy a Balloon
- Jean and Jaque were Twins
- Ootchey Coochy
- Our Hearts They are Light (Christening Song)
- Two Heads are Better than One
- When I joined the Army
- When It's a Boy

== Critical reception ==
A review in The Illustrated American commented: "Cheever Goodwin, clever at adaptation, at times a most dexterous manipulator in stagecraft, has been singularly successful in this latest venture. Starting of a delightfully humorous set of complications, woven logically together, he has made an honest translation and obtained a genuinely absurd farce which he carries through four acts, sustaining the interest to the end."
