= Richard Barker (stage manager) =

English actor and director (1834–1903)

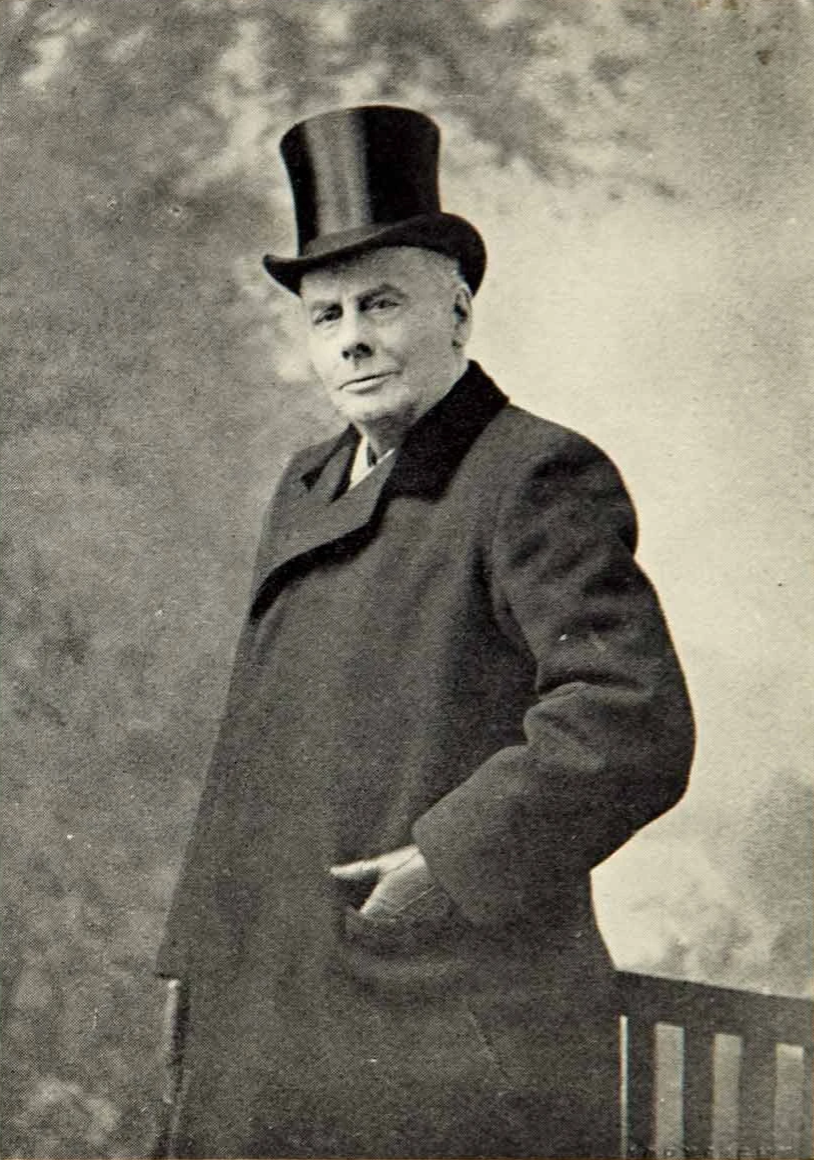
Richard Barker, c. 1901

Henry de Grey Warter (28 July 1834 – 1 August 1903), better known under the stage name Richard Barker, was a British actor, stage manager and stage director. He stage managed many of Gilbert and Sullivan's comic operas and other productions of the D'Oyly Carte Opera Company, and directed some of them, and in the 1890s directed musicals in New York as well as London.

== Early life and career ==
Barker was born in Highgate in London. He was descended from the Warter family of landowners, based in Shropshire with holdings around Pontesbury. His father was Henry de Grey "Diggory" Warter (1807–1884), a solicitor who from the 1860s acquired lands around the Hawley estate and Oaks Manor, and owned Longden Manor, and his mother was Harriett Benbow (1799–1875), daughter of John Benbow. John Wood Warter was his uncle.

His father left substantially all of his estate to Barker's sister, Eliza Mary Warter (1835–1897).

In 1851, aged 16, he was an articled clerk. During the 1860s Barker had a brief stage career. Early roles were Colonel Pointdexter in The Octoroon by Dion Boucicault and the messenger in Shakespeare's King John. In 1865 he married the actress and comedienne Marie Cruise (1831–1887) at Plymouth in Devon. In 1868 he played Bertram in Robert the Devil, by W. S. Gilbert.

== Director and stage manager ==
Finding that he had no unusual talent for acting, Barker was soon making his way as a director of burlesques and other musical productions. He produced tours of Gilbert's Dan'l Druce, Blacksmith in the British provinces in 1876 and 1877, which (together with debts he later incurred in leasing London's Opera Comique) led to his eventual bankruptcy in 1888. He formed a partnership with the London impresario Richard D'Oyly Carte by 1876 and worked as stage manager and business manager for Carte's Gilbert and Sullivan productions at the Opera Comique until 1881, of which he was the lessee from 1879 to 1885. As W. S. Gilbert, author-director of the D'Oyly Carte Opera Company, was in New York in late 1879, Barker directed the children's version of H.M.S. Pinafore in London.

After his father's death, Barker produced pieces at the Gaiety Theatre, the Opera Comique and the Empire Theatre in London, and stage-managed British provincial tours for Carte. He rejoined D'Oyly Carte as stage manager at the Savoy Theatre in the late 1880s and 1890s, directing a children's version of The Pirates of Penzance in 1884–1885, and also directing several of Carte's American productions, including The Mikado (1885), Ruddigore (1887), The Yeomen of the Guard (1888 and again in 1892) and The Chieftain (1895).

In New York, he directed nearly three dozen productions, including The Merry Monarch in 1890 (he later directed a British version of the show, The Lucky Star, for D'Oyly Carte, in 1899). His other New York productions included The Lion Tamer and an Extravaganza version of Bluebeard, Jr. starring Eddie Foy Sr. at Niblo's Garden, both in 1891, and in 1894 The Little Trooper at the Casino Theatre and The Devil's Deputy at Abbey's Theatre. In 1896 at the newly renamed Knickerbocker Theatre (formerly the Abbey), he directed a comic opera called Half a King, and directed The Little Corporal in New York in 1898. On 15 November 1898 he married American-born Regine Justine Hatzig (1867 – after 1911) at St Mary's church in Acton in London. Back at the Savoy Theatre in London, he stage managed and co-directed Arthur Sullivan's The Emerald Isle and directed a musical play, The Willow Pattern, for Carte in 1901, followed by Merrie England in 1902.

== Death and legacy ==
He died in Kensington at the age of 69 and left his estate, valued at £73, to his widow, Regine.

In Mike Leigh's 1999 film Topsy-Turvy, Barker was played by Sam Kelly.

According to theatre historian Thomas S. Hischak, "In a day when directors of musical [theatre] were little more than traffic managers on stage, Barker had very definite ideas about the movement of actors and the importance of creating an overall visual effect. His work in New York influenced the next generation of American directors and led to a more cohesive staging of musicals."

== Sources ==
- Ainger, Michael (2002). Gilbert and Sullivan, a Dual Biography. Oxford: Oxford University Press. ISBN 0-19-514769-3.
- Bordman, Gerald (2001). American Musical Theater: A Chronicle. Oxford University Press, USA. ISBN 978-0-19-513074-4.
- Cellier, François and Cunningham Bridgeman (1914). Gilbert and Sullivan and Their Operas. London: Sir Isaac Pitman & sons, ltd.
- Griffel, Margaret Ross (2012). Operas in English: A Dictionary. Scarecrow Press. ISBN 978-0-8108-8325-3.
- Hischak, Thomas S. (2008). The Oxford Companion to the American Musical. Oxford University Press. ISBN 978-0-19-533533-0.
- Rollins, Cyril; R. John Witts (1962). The D'Oyly Carte Opera Company in Gilbert and Sullivan Operas: A Record of Productions, 1875–1961. London: Michael Joseph. OCLC 504581419.
