= L'étoile (opera) =

1877 opéra bouffe by Emmanuel Chabrier

- Opéra bouffe by Emmanuel Chabrier
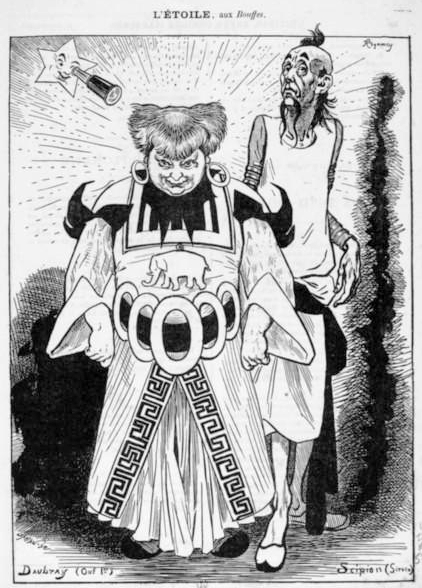
- Press cartoon for the premiere by Félix Régamey
- Librettist: Eugène Leterrier; Albert Vanloo
- Language: French
- Premiere: 28 November 1877; Théâtre des Bouffes Parisiens

L'étoile is an opéra bouffe in three acts by Emmanuel Chabrier with a libretto by Eugène Leterrier and Albert Vanloo.

Chabrier met his librettists at the home of a mutual friend, the painter Gaston Hirsh, in 1875. Chabrier played to them early versions of the romance "O petite étoile" and the ensemble "Le pal, est de tous les supplices..." (with words by Verlaine which Leterrier and Vanloo found too bold and toned down). They agreed to collaborate and Chabrier set about composition with enthusiasm. The story echoes some of the characters and situations of Chabrier's one-act comic opera Fisch-Ton-Kan, which premiered in 1875.

== Performance history ==
L'étoile premiered on 28 November 1877 at Offenbach's Théâtre des Bouffes Parisiens. In its initial run the members of the small orchestra were appalled at the difficulty of Chabrier’s score, which was much more sophisticated than anything Offenbach wrote for the small boulevard theatre.

The opera was first performed outside France in Berlin on 4 October 1878, then in Budapest on 23 November 1878. In New York City in 1890 at the Broadway Theatre, an English adaptation by J. Cheever Goodwin was titled The Merry Monarch, with new music by Woolson Morse. Chabrier's music fared no better in London in 1899, where the score was rewritten by Ivan Caryll for an adaptation at the Savoy Theatre called The Lucky Star. In Brussels in 1909, Chabrier's music was restored, and there was a performance at the Arts Décoratifs Exposition in Paris in 1925, conducted by Albert Wolff.

The operetta's first major revival was on 10 April 1941 at the Opéra-Comique in Paris under Nazi occupation, with Fanély Revoil, René Hérent, Lillie Grandval, and André Balbon in the cast, at which time highlights were recorded, conducted by Roger Désormière; this production was revived in December 1946 with Revoil and Payen. New productions were mounted at the Opéra-Comique in October 1984 with Colette Alliot-Lugaz and Michel Sénéchal in leading roles, and in December 2007 with Jean-Luc Viala and Stéphanie d’Oustrac.

The first complete recording, by EMI in 1985, conducted by John Eliot Gardiner, followed a production at the Opéra National de Lyon the previous year starring Alliot-Lugaz, which was also filmed for television by FR3 in November 1985 and broadcast in 1986.

L'étoile has been performed with increasing frequency and more widely in the 21st century, with productions at Opera North in 1991, Glimmerglass and Maastricht in 2001, New York City Opera in 2003 (revived in March 2010), Toronto in 2005, Montreal and Cincinnati in 2006, Zurich in 2007 and Geneva in 2009. In 2010 it was presented at the Austin Lyric Opera, Texas, the Berlin State Opera (conducted by Simon Rattle) and Theater Bielefeld. A production by David Alden was mounted in repertory at Frankfurt Opera in 2010 and 2011. New Sussex Opera staged an English-language version in 2013, a touring production in Sussex and London as Lucky Star, conducted by Nicholas Jenkins.

The opera was part of the Dutch National Opera's 2014/15 season in October 2014, and a 2019 DVD/blu-ray of this Laurent Pelly production with d'Oustrac, conducted by Patrick Fournillier, was awarded a Diapason d'Or. The Royal Opera (London) gave several performances in early 2016, the first at that house.

== Roles ==
Role	Voice type	Premiere Cast, 28 November 1877 (Conductor: Léon Roques)
Ouf 1^{er}, King of the 36 realms	tenor	Daubray
Siroco, astrologer	bass	Étienne Scipion
Prince Hérisson de Porc-Epic, Ambassador of the court of Mataquin	baritone	Alfred Jolly
Tapioca, Hérisson's secretary	tenor	Jannin
Lazuli	mezzo-soprano	Paola Marié
La Princesse Laoula	soprano	Berthe Stuart
Aloès, Hérisson's wife	mezzo-soprano	Luce
Oasis, Maid of honour	soprano	Blot
Asphodèle, Youca, Adza, Zinnia, Koukouli, Maids of honour	sopranos, mezzos	
Chief of police	spoken	Pescheux
Chorus: People, guards, courtiers

Source: Delage

== Synopsis ==
=== Act 1 ===
King Ouf 1^{er} roams his city in disguise, searching for a suitable subject to execute as a birthday treat. Hérisson de Porc-Epic, an ambassador, arrives with his wife Aloès, accompanied by his secretary Tapioca and Laoula, the daughter of a neighboring monarch. They are traveling incognito, and the princess is being passed off as Hérisson's wife. Their mission, of which Laoula is unaware, is to marry her to Ouf. Complications arise when Laoula and a poor peddler, Lazuli, fall in love at first sight. When he is scolded for flirting, Lazuli insults the disguised king and thus becomes a candidate for death by impalement. But Siroco, the king's astrologer, reveals that the fates of the king and the peddler are inextricably linked: the stars predict that they will die within 24 hours of each other. Lazuli is then escorted with honors into the palace.

=== Act 2 ===
Lazuli, now feted and well fed, grows bored with luxury and longs for Laoula. Ouf, still unaware of the disguises, furthers the lovers' hopes of marriage by imprisoning Hérisson. The lovers depart. Hérisson escapes and orders the peddler shot. Gunfire is heard and Laoula is brought in, but there is no sign of Lazuli. Ouf bemoans his impending death.

=== Act 3 ===
Lazuli has suffered no harm. After overhearing Ouf, Siroco, and Hérisson discussing the situation, he reveals himself to Laoula. They make plans to elope. The king and Siroco try to raise their spirits with a large glass of green chartreuse. Ouf, desperate to produce an heir to the throne before he dies, plans to marry Laoula, even if for an hour, but finds that he has run out of time. When the clocks strike five and nothing happens to him, Ouf declares that the astrologer's predictions must have been wrong. The Chief of Police then appears with Lazuli, who was caught trying to flee the kingdom. Ouf blesses Lazuli and Laoula's marriage. In a general final chorus Lazuli and Laoula address the audience in a reprise of act 1 finale.

== Video recordings ==
- John Eliot Gardiner (conductor), Orchestre et Chœurs de L'Opéra de Lyon; with Colette Alliot-Lugaz (Lazuli), Jules Bastin, Franois Le Roux, Bernard Maigrot, Elizabeth Vidal, Michel Fockenoy, Albert Vanloo, Antoine David, Isabelle Eschenbrenner, Ghyslaine Raphanel, Magali Damonte, Isabelle Mament, Georges Gautier, Ren Schirrer, Eugne Leterrier; Image Entertainment 1986 DVD.
- Patrick Fournillier (conductor), Laurent Pelly (stage director and costume designer), Hague Residentie Orchestra, Dutch National Opera Chorus, with Stéphanie d’Oustrac (Lazuli ), Christophe Mortagne (Le Roi Ouf I), Hélène Guilmette (La Princesse Laoula), Jérôme Varnier (Siroco), -Elliot Madore (Hérisson de Porc-Épic), Julie Boulianne (Aloès), François Piolino (Tapioca), François Soons (Patacha), Harry Teeuwen (Zalzal), Jeroen van Glabbeek (Le Maître), Richard Prada (Le Chef de la Police), Naxos 2019 Blu-Ray and DVD.
