= Dr. Syntax (musical) =

1894 play by DeWolf Hopper

Dr. Syntax is a musical in two acts with music by Woolson Morse and a libretto by J. Cheever Goodwin that was adapted from Thomas William Robertson's 1869 play School. The work was a revised version of Morse's earlier work Cinderella at School.

The original 1894 production was produced by DeWolf Hopper. His wife at that time, Edna Wallace Hopper, appeared in the cast.

It debuted at the Broadway Theatre on June 23, 1894. The Best Plays of 1884-1899 (1955) says it had a "comfortable run of 159 performances." It then toured, and was notably performed for the inaugural opening of Parsons Theatre in Hartford, Connecticut on April 1, 1896.
