= The Merry Monarch (musical) =

Comic opera by J. Cheever Goodwin and Woolson Morse

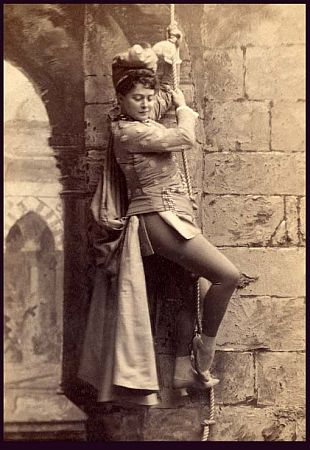
- Marie Jansen in The Merry Monarch
- Original language: English
- Written by: Adaptation of L'étoile by J. Cheever Goodwin, new music by Woolson Morse

Premiere
- Date: 18 August 1890
- Place: Broadway Theatre (41st Street)

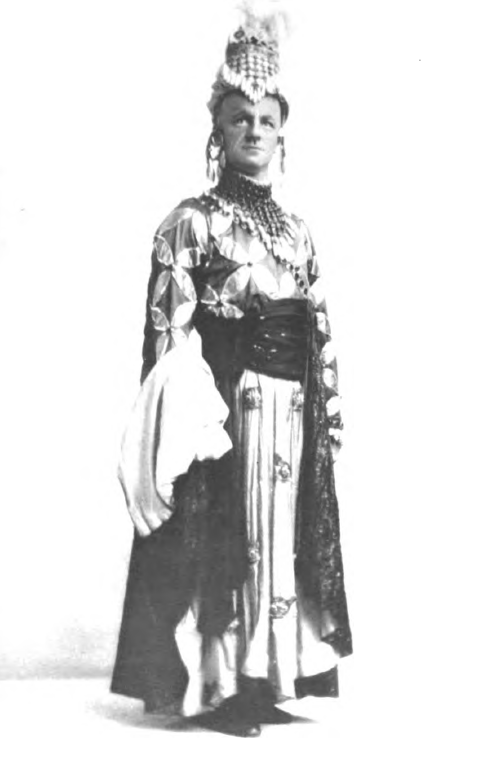
Francis Wilson as King Anso IV

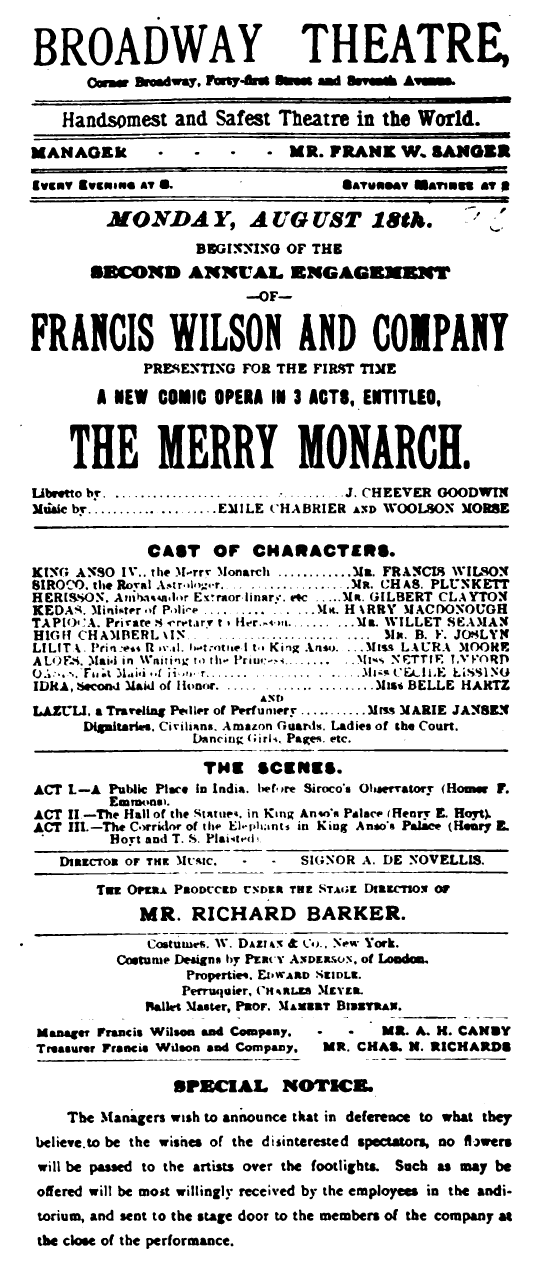
Opening night bill, August 18, 1890

The Merry Monarch is an 1890 comic opera that debuted at the Broadway Theatre in New York City. It is an English adaptation of the L'étoile with a book by J. Cheever Goodwin and new music by Woolson Morse. The work in set in India, with the second act taking place in the interior of the palace of King Anso IV.

== History ==
Presented by actor-manager Francis Wilson and his company, which also featured Marie Jansen, The Merry Monarch debuted on August 18, 1890, and ran for 49 performances, through October 4. Though this was not considered a long run for the time, the show was turning large profits, and crowds were being turned away from every performance. The New York Times reported on September 29 that the opera was sure to gross at least $87,000 during the run, "the largest amount by many thousands ever taken at the theatre in the same period at regular prices." But the theatre had other contractual engagements that prevented a longer run, and it was announced that the production would return the following fall. The opera immediately went on the road, also playing to packed houses. The play returned after the long run of Wang concluded, and ran from October 5 through December 26, 1891, for 84 more performances. On the second run, a young Lulu Glaser served as the understudy for star Marie Jansen. It may have run longer, but Wilson was anxious to bring out his next piece, The Lion Tamer, which immediately followed.

The stage manager for the production was Richard Barker, and costume designs were by Percy Anderson. Scenery was by Homer Emmons, Henry E. Hoyt, and Plaisted, and the orchestra conducted by Signore A. De Novellis

Another English adaptation of L'étoile played at London's Savoy Theatre in 1899, called The Lucky Star, with a score rewritten by Ivan Caryll and new lyrics by Aubrey Hopwood.

== Original Broadway cast ==
- King Anso IV by Francis Wilson
- Siroco, by Charles Plunkett
- Herisson by Gilbert Clayton
- Kedas by Harry MacDonough
- Tapioca by Willet Seaman
- High Chamberlain by M.F. Joslyn
- Lilita by Laura Moore
- Aloes by Nettie Lyford
- Oasis by Cecile Essing
- Idra by Belle Hartz
- Lazuli by Marie Jansen
