= Della Fox =

American comic actress and singer

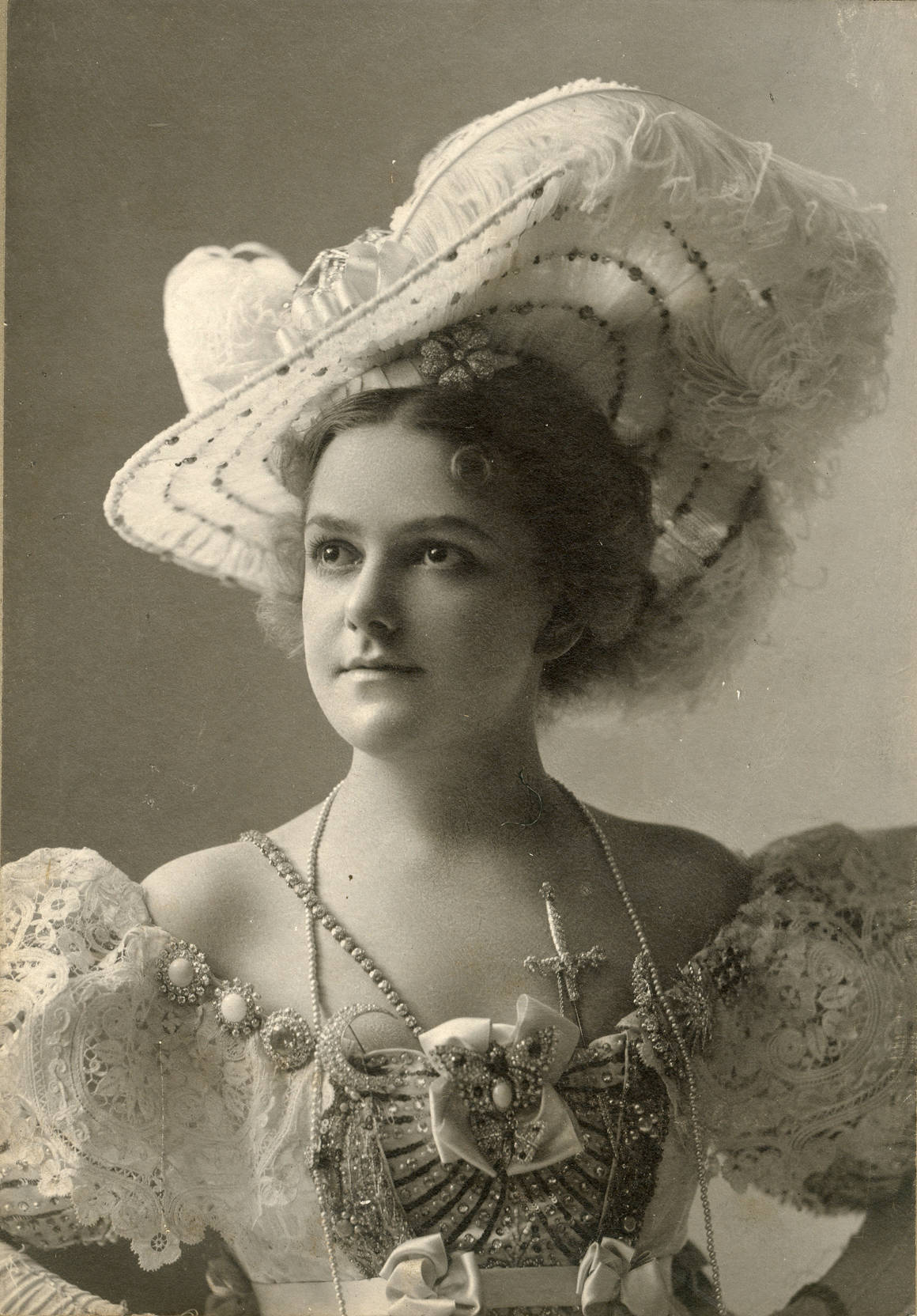
- Born: Della May Fox; October 13, 1870; St. Louis, Missouri, US
- Died: June 15, 1913 (aged 42); New York City, US
- Resting place: Bellefontaine Cemetery, St. Louis
- Occupation: Actress/Singer
- Spouse: Jacob David Levy (m. 1901)

Della May Fox (October 13, 1870 – June 15, 1913) was an American singing comedian, whose popularity peaked in the 1890s when the diminutive Fox appeared opposite the very tall DeWolf Hopper in several musicals. She also toured successfully with her own company.

== Biography ==
Fox was born in St. Louis, Missouri, the daughter of Andrew J. Fox, a leading St. Louis photographer who had a specialty of theatrical subjects, and Harriett Swett. She made her first appearance on stage at age 7 as the Midshipmate in a St. Louis production of H.M.S. Pinafore and subsequently played children's roles with Marie Prescott's company. In 1880 she appeared as Adrienne in A Celebrated Case and came to the attention of Augustus Thomas and his Dickson Sketch Club.

When Thomas dramatized Frances Hodgson Burnett's story Editha's Burglar, he engaged Fox to play the leading role, her first professional engagement. Thomas had the play expanded from one to a three-act play which gave Fox more prominence. From 1883 through 1885, the play toured the U.S. Midwest and Canada, and Fox was chaperoned by Nellie Page (a leading lady) and tutored by Thomas. Although her parents wanted her to attend boarding school, Fox was determined to become an actress. In the late 1880s, she appeared with Comley Barton and the Bennett and Moulton Opera Company, with which she played soprano roles in operettas such as Fra Diavolo, The Bohemian Girl, The Pirates of Penzance, Billee Taylor and The Mikado.

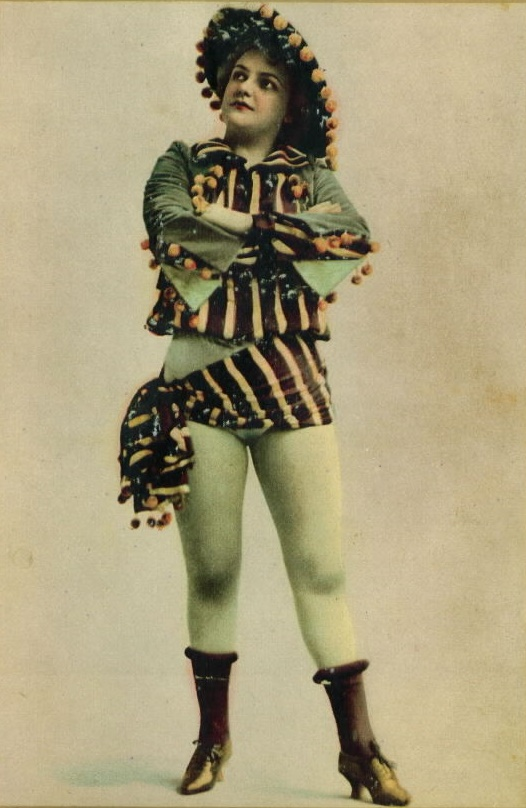
Fox, possibly costumed for Panjandrum, ca. 1893

In February 1889, she appeared for the first time in New York, at Niblo's Garden. Her operetta roles brought her to the attention of Heinrich Conried, who had her play Yvonne, the soubrette part in The King's Fool, singing the song "Fair Columbia". Conried also provided Fox with the only acting lessons she received. When the newly formed DeWolf Opera Company was seeking a supporting cast, George W. Lederer of the New York Casino Theatre suggested Fox. In May 1890, Hopper opened in Gustave Kerker's Castles in the Air, with Fox playing Blanche. Her first big success occurred in 1891 when she played Prince Mataya together with Hopper in his production of Wang, singing "Another Fellow". The show was so popular that Fox and Hopper continued to play in it through 1892. In 1893, Fox re-teamed with Hopper in Panjandrum, followed by The Lady or the Tiger in 1894.

In 1894 she starred as Clairette in William Furst's The Little Trooper, and in 1895 in the same composer's Fleur-de-Lis, continuing to play in comic opera and operetta. Also in 1895, Fay Templeton dedicated her song, I Want Yer Ma Honey to Fox, as did Franc L. Grannis with his song My Little Secret. In 1897 she appeared with Lillian Russell and Jefferson De Angelis in The Wedding Day. By 1898, Fox succeeded in forming her own company, producing and starring in The Little Host which played with success from December 26, 1898 through March 1899. The diminutive, plump Fox became known for her childlike persona and her bobbed hairstyle: the "Della Fox curl" was later imitated by girls across America.

Beginning in 1899, Fox suffered from ill health and the effects of alcohol and drug abuse, and on October 28, 1899, she was reported to be dying of peritonitis, but survived and returned to the stage. In June 1900 she suffered a nervous breakdown but returned to the stage by September for The Rogers Brothers in Central Park. In December 1901, Fox married Jacob David Levy, a diamond broker, in Boston. After the marriage, she appeared mostly in vaudeville houses. In 1904, she was committed to an institution, the Brunswick Home on Long Island. She recovered and made two more appearances on Broadway: in The West Point Cadet (1904), and her final show, Rosedale (1913).

Fox died at a private sanatorium in New York City in 1913, aged 42. She is buried in Bellefontaine Cemetery in St. Louis, Missouri.

== Critical response ==
Lewis Clinton Strang described seeing Fox at various stages of her career. Writing after 1900, he summarized: "Her appealing, unsophisticated girlishness had gone, and in its place was self-possession and authority. She was charming in her daintiness, provoking in her coquetry, a tanalizing atom of feminity. Her archness was not bold nor unwomanly, and her vivacity was well within the bounds of refinement and good taste. Her singing voice, too, was musical, though not over strong."

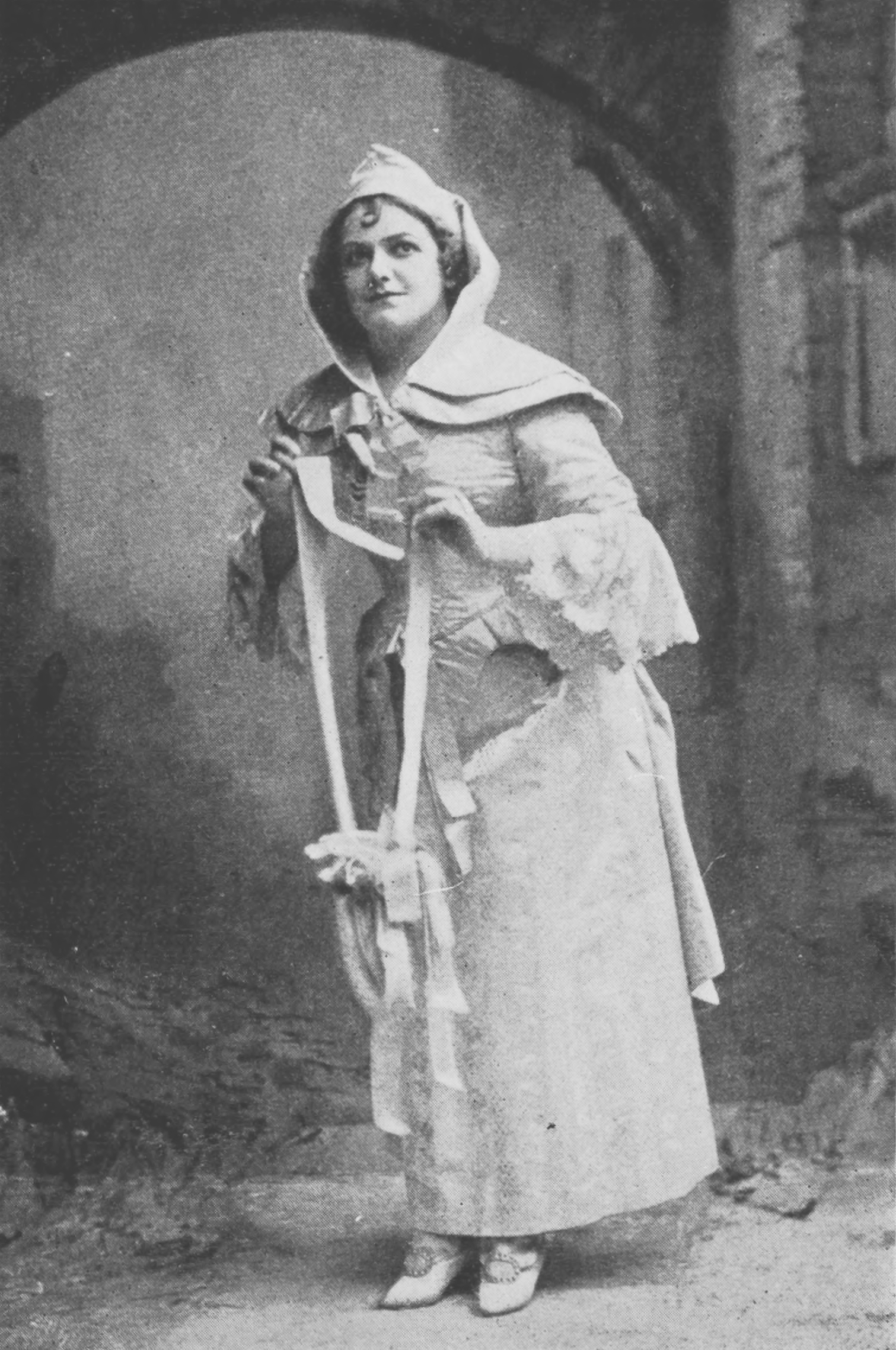
Fox in 1894

In describing her first supporting role with DeWolf Hopper, Strang wrote: "Her success in this larger field was remarkable, and before the summer was over she was sharing the honors with Hopper and was just as strong a popular favorite as he. Her Blanche was a delightful creation throughout, but best remembered is the "athletic duet" in which she and Hopper gave amusing pantomimic representations of games of billiards, baseball, and other familiar sports." Of her role in Wang, Strang wrote: "This was, perhaps, the most artistic of all her roles. She was cute, impish, and jaunty in turn as the Crown Prince, and, in addition, was a picture never to be forgotten in her perfect fitting white flannel suit, worn in the second act."

Of Panjandrum, an unnamed New York Times reviewer wrote that [Hopper] "gets a peculiar sort of assistance from Miss Della Fox, who can neither act nor sing and who is not pretty, but who rejoices in a marvelous popularity." Yet a subsequent reviewer (also unnamed) wrote: [Fox's] songs and dances are encored until the little woman is forced from sheer weariness to decline further responses." Author Willa Cather was delighted by Panjandrum and wrote of its co-star:

Miss Della Fox is indescribable as she is audacious and as delicious as she is audacious. She is little, very little beside Mr. Hopper's awful bigness, and captivating, and in the fullest sense of the word, she is chic. She is undoubtedly the most popular woman on stage just now. When the Dramatic News was rash enough to publish her picture they sold out all their issue and by the constant demand of the public were forced to reprint the picture in the next issue. Many actresses have elements of success, but Della Fox has success, which is quite a different thing. She has the dash and natural flippancy of a comedienne. She carries mirth in her face and has laughter hidden away in her eyes. She only has to move her foot and the house feels happy, she has only to wink her eye and it laughs, she has only to faint on a barrel and hundred of people are carried away by convulsions of laughter. She has a sort of personal magnetism of mirth about her. There is nothing really pretty in her face, yet she was bewitching as a blond, fascinating as a brunette, and because of her vivacity altogether lovely.

Philip Hale wrote of her role in Fleur-De-Lis:

Disagreeable qualities in the customary performance of Miss Fox were not nearly so much in evidence as in some of her other characters. She was not so deliberately affected, she was not so brazen in her assurance. Even her vocal mannerisms were not so conspicuous. She almost played with discretion, and often she was delightful. Her self-introduction to her father was one long to be remembered. No wonder that the audience insisted on seeing it again and again. All in all, Miss Fox appeared greatly to her advantage.

At the turn of the century, this description summed up Fox's talent:

She is a delightful little fairy with whom to be cast upon desert places. She has a continual childish sparkle of humor, never failing under trials submerging the usual woman, and her distresses are as comic as her escapades of fun. She doesn't think deeply, but she thinks often, and the result of her fleecy little mental efforts are always silvered with a laugh.... Miss Fox has no voice to brag upon, but her personality and piquancy, her earnestness and fund of natural American humor make her an enjoyable singer of tuneful ditties and chic airs. She dances with fairy grace, and turns a joke into laughter with a snap of her fingers or flash of her eye. She is a great pet of boys and girls; they believe in Della blindly, and adore her for fooling them.

== Notes ==
=== References ===
- Strang, Lewis Clinton. Famous Prima Donnas (Boston: L. C. Page & Co., 1906), pp. 192–207.
