= Panjandrum (musical) =

Musical premiered on Broadway in 1893

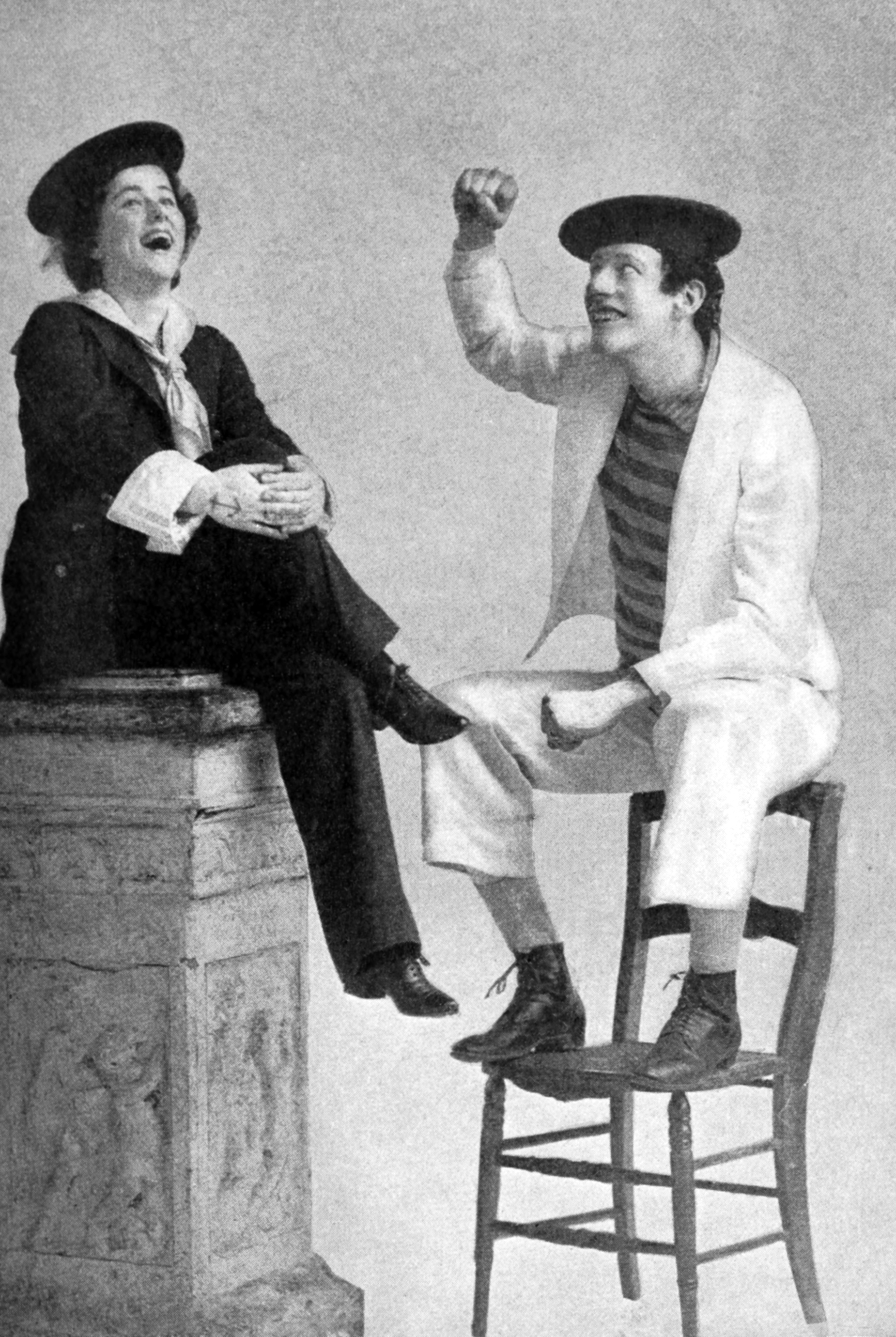
Edna Wallace Hopper and DeWolf Hopper in Panjandrum (1893)

Panjandrum is a musical with music by Woolson Morse and words by J. Cheever Goodwin, written for and produced by the DeWolf Hopper Opera Company. It opened on May 1, 1893, at the Broadway Theatre (on 41st Street, now demolished) in New York and closed at the end of September 1893.

Described as an "olla podrida" in two acts, Panjandrum is set in the Philippines. It starred Hopper as Pedro and Della Fox as Paquita; Fox was replaced by Hopper's new wife, Edna Wallace, but Fox eventually rejoined the cast. The plot centers around a toreador trying to regain his sweetheart. The two of them and her friend are all captured by a savage tribe, and Pedro is disguised as the king of the tribe.

== Background ==
The production and audience received a special benefit at the performance of May 30, 1893, when Infanta Eulalia of Spain attended a performance accompanied by Spanish dignitaries, Thomas Francis Gilroy (then Mayor of New York) and others. The Infanta arrived late - the performance began at 9 pm and did not conclude until after 11 pm. DeWolf Hopper and the cast had prepared special lines for the closing song and substituted them:

"Our hearts go out to Spain's fairest flower, the welcome beloved Infanta."

In late June 1893, the Broadway Theatre underwent renovation of its air-cooling apparatus. Apparently this caused a slight cessation of performances, enabling the creators to introduce a "second edition" of Panjandrum on June 28, 1893. In the new version, "the libretto has been almost entirely rewritten by its author, Mr. Goodwin, and several new musical numbers have been prepared by Mr. Morse, the composer." Among the changes were Hopper in "several new rollicking songs. The role of Rotomango, played by Samuel Reed, has been revised, and instead of a fierce Bornese he will be seen as a humble New-Englander who, by a peculiar chain of circumstances, has been made the Grand Vizier of the Kingdom. In addition to the many changes made in the characters there will be several new musical numbers written in the composer's best vein, and also many humorous lines and funny situations, which have been contributed by the author."

Also on June 28, 1893, DeWolf Hopper was married to his third wife, Edna Wallace Hopper, a young actress. The romance had been kept secret from Hopper's company, who had thought that he was to marry his co-star, Della Fox. Edna Wallace Hopper replaced Fox for performances beginning on July 17. Apparently, the new Mrs. Hopper was replaced by Grace Golden by August 20, who was replaced by the original Paquita, Della Fox on September 4. Of note, the dancer Loie Fuller appeared in the show for three weeks in September.

== Synopsis ==
Setting: An island in the Philippines

Pedro, a matador, sings a toreador song. Finding that his sweetheart Paquita has been attracted by the prowess of another matador, he resolves to regain her affection by himself fighting the bull. Failing at this, he tries to win her back by helping her to arrange the elopement of her friend. The party is captured by a savage tribe supposedly ruled by King Panjandrum. It turns out that Panjandrum has been dead for six years, but his advisors have been hiding the fact. Pedro looks remarkably like the late Panjandrum and is substituted for the king. He performs the duties of the king admirably.

== Roles and original cast ==
- Pedro – DeWolf Hopper
- Luiz – Edmund Stanley
- Rotomago – Samuel Reed
- Don José – Alfred Klein
- Manuel and Alcade – John A. Parks
- Bobo – Camm Mauvel
- Donna Inez – Annette St. Henry
- Indra – Anna O'Keefe
- Donna Maria – Marion Singer
- Piko – Agnes Reily
- Ysabel – Helen Beresford
- Paquita – Della Fox (replaced by Edna Wallace, then Grace Golden, before Fox returned to the cast)

== Songs ==
- A Sad Predicament
- A Perfect Wreck
- Ay De Mi
- Fakirs from Fakirsville
- Love is not for Daytime
- Song of the Espada
- Sunshine After Rain
- The Old, Old Story
- What Would You Say?
- When Two Hearts Love

== Critical response ==
The New York Times observed that Panjandrum "combines operetta, burlesque, farce-comedy, and pantomime and the funniest part of all is the pantomime." The Times review continued, [Hopper] "gets a peculiar sort of assistance from Miss Della Fox, who can neither act nor sing and who is not pretty, but who rejoices in a marvelous popularity." Yet two weeks later, apparently another New York Times critic wrote, "It has plenty of catchy airs, a long series of comic situations, following each other so closely that the audience has scarcely breathing time between successive laughs, and plot enough to carry the interest of the spectators to the close." Of Della Fox, the second review noted, "Her songs and dances are encored until the little woman is forced from sheer weariness to decline further responses."

When Hopper's new wife, Edna Wallace-Hopper, replaced Fox for performances beginning on July 17, The New York Times critic commented: "At any rate, hands came together all over the house in a long and genial patter when the little Mrs. Hopper appeared, dressed in lace and yellow and looking just a bit timid and apprehensive.... Her voice, like that of conscience, is still and small, but in an opera like Panjandrum nobody notices voices. To seem to sing is quite enough, if others arts and graces are present."
