= Colette Alliot-Lugaz =

French soprano (born 1947)

Colette Alliot-Lugaz (born 20 July 1947) is a French soprano, particularly associated with Mozart.

== Career ==
Born in Notre-Dame-de-Bellecombe, she began her musical studies in Bonneville (Haute Savoie), and later in Geneva, with Magda Fonay-Besson. She completed her training at the Paris Opéra-Studio with René Koster and Vera Rosza. She made her stage debut as Pamina, in a production of The Magic Flute by the Opéra-Studio, in 1976.

Although Mozart would always remain at the core of her repertoire (Susanna, Zerlina), she gradually included roles such as Rosina, Annchen, Véronique, as well as many roles in operas by Monteverdi, Rameau, Charpentier and Haydn.

She joined the Opéra National de Lyon, where she sang a memorable Mélisande in 1980. She also appeared at the Paris Opéra, La Monnaie in Brussels, the Aix-en-Provence Festival, and the Glyndebourne Festival.

She created the role of the Page in Philippe Boesmans's La Passion de Gilles in 1983.

== Sources ==
- Le dictionnaire des interprètes, Alain Pâris, (Éditions Robert Laffont, 1989), ISBN 2-221-06660-X
