= Broadway Theatre (41st Street) =

Former theatre in Manhattan, New York

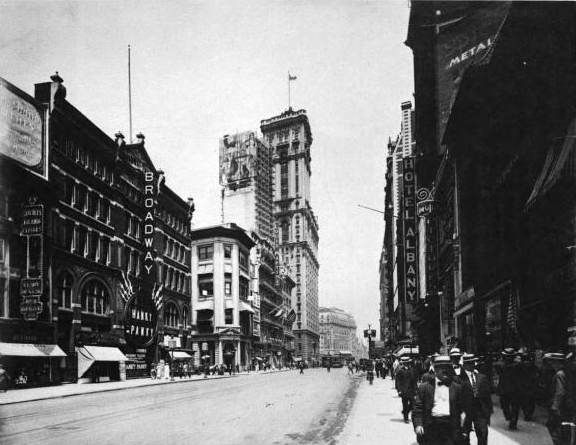
- The Broadway Theatre on the left in 1912, playing Hanky Panky
- Interactive map of Broadway Theatre
- Address: 1445 Broadway; New York City; United States
- Coordinates: 40°45′18.5″N 73°59′13.5″W

Construction
- Opened: March 3, 1888
- Closed: January 1929
- Architects: J.B. McElfatrick & Co.

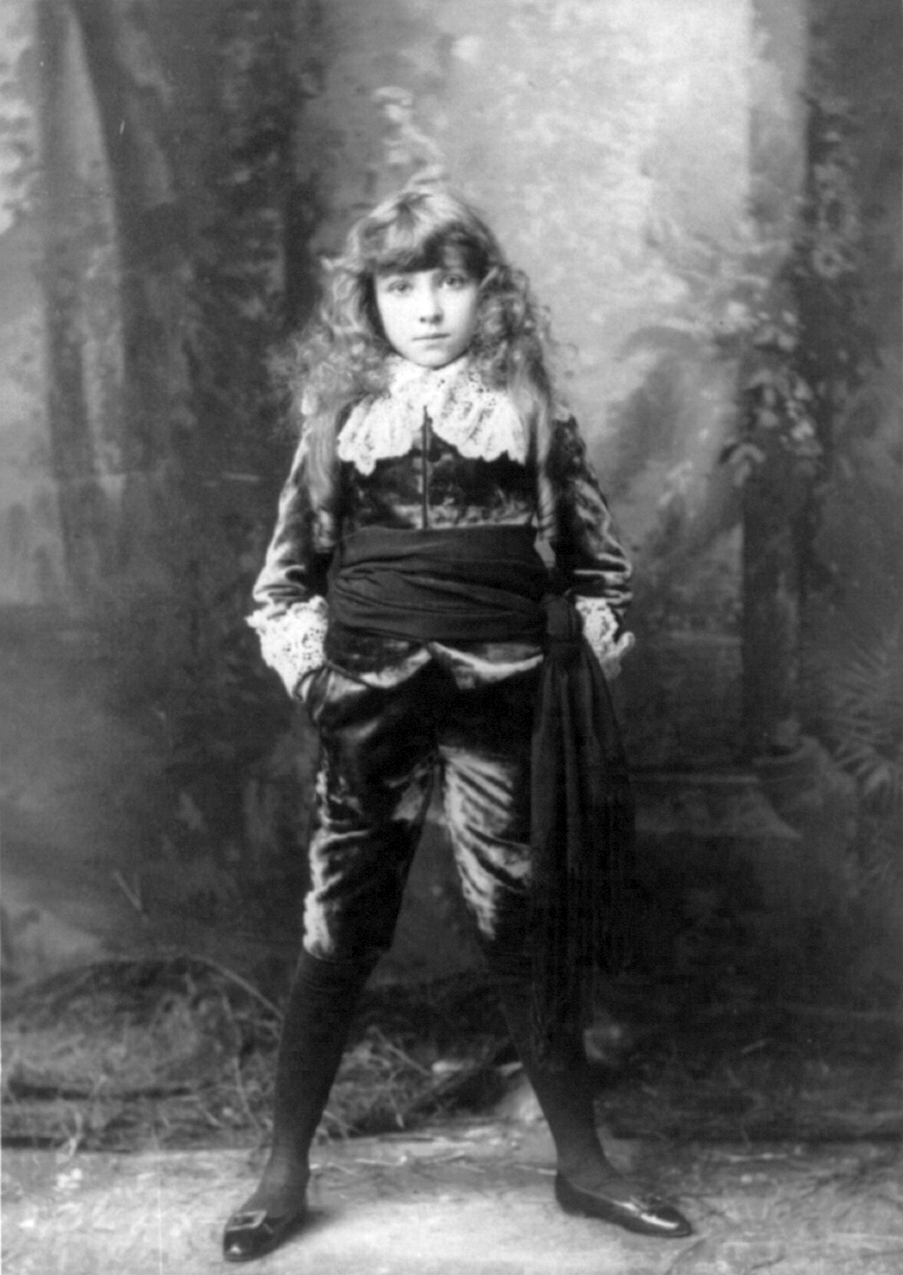
Elsie Leslie in Little Lord Fauntleroy (1888)

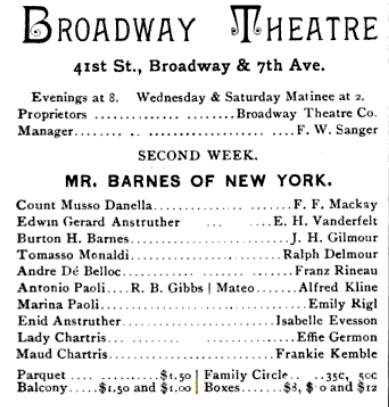
Advertisement for an adaptation of Mr. Barnes of New York, 1888

The Broadway Theatre near 41st Street was a Broadway theatre in Manhattan, New York City, which operated from 1888 to 1929. It was located at 1445 Broadway.

== History ==
James Anthony Bailey, a circus manager and owner (the "Bailey" in Ringling Bros. and Barnum & Bailey Circus) started building the theatre in 1887 on the site of what had been the "Metropolitan Concert Hall" built in 1880. Bailey pulled out, and the project was completed by Frank Sanger, T.H. French, and E. Zborowski, with seating for about 1,800 and standing room for 500 more. The American premiere of La Tosca was performed on the theatre's opening night, March 3, 1888, featuring Fanny Davenport. It was not a great success, due in part to the Great Blizzard of 1888 hitting New York ten days later, and it closed on April 28.

The first successful run was Little Lord Fauntleroy, with the title role alternately played by Elsie Leslie and Tommy Russell, which hit 100 showings on March 21, 1889. Lawrence Barrett's final performance was at the theatre in March 1891, when he became ill during a performance of Richelieu. Edwin Booth's last New York performance occurred at the theatre that same month. El Capitan, John Philip Sousa's most enduring operetta, opened here in 1896 before tours, revivals and a successful London run. The highly successful Ben-Hur debuted in November 1899, the greatest production which the theatre ever hosted. Mrs. Leslie Carter, who later obtained fame with The Heart of Maryland, made her stage debut at the Broadway Theatre in 1890 in The Ugly Duckling.

Starting around 1903, the theatre featured almost all musical productions. In 1913, after the closing of The American Maid, the theatre was used for vaudeville and motion picture shows.

== Demise ==
The last performance was a vaudeville show called Broadway Fever in January 1929, and the theatre was soon after demolished. The site is now occupied by the 33-story Bricken-Textile Building, built in 1929.

In 1930, the former Colony Theatre on 53rd Street was renamed the Broadway Theatre, a name it still retains.

== Notable productions ==
- Little Lord Fauntleroy (1888)
- The Oolah (1889, 154 perf.) (starring Francis Wilson)
- Castles in the Air (1890, 106 perf.) (starring DeWolf Hopper)
- The Merry Monarch (1890, return in 1891 after Wang) (starring Francis Wilson)
- Wang (1891, 151 perf.) (starring DeWolf Hopper)
- Panjandrum (1893, 156 perf.) (starring DeWolf Hopper)
- Utopia Limited (1894)
- Tabasco (1894) (Starring Thomas Q. Seabrooke)
- Dr. Syntax (1894, 78 perf.?)
- Madame Sans-Gêne (1895, American premiere)
- El Capitan (1896, 112 perf.)
- The Highwayman (1897, 144 perf.)
- Ben-Hur (1899) (194 perf.)
- The Sleeping Beauty and the Beast (1901, 241 perf.)
- The Silver Slipper (1902, 168 perf.)
- The Prince of Pilsen (1903, 143 perf.)
- The Yankee Consul (1904, 115 perf.)
- Veronique (1905, 81 performances; American premiere)
- The Vanderbilt Cup (1906, 143 perf.)
- A Parisian Model (1906, 179 perf.)
- A Waltz Dream (1908, 111 perf.)
- The Midnight Sons (1909, 257 perf.)
- The Jolly Bachelors (1910, 165 perf.)
- The Summer Widowers (1910, 140 perf.)
- The Hen-Pecks (1911, 137 perf.)
- Hokey Pokey and Bunty Bulls and Strings (1912, 108 perf.)
- Hanky Panky (1912, 104 perf.)
