= Wang (musical) =

Musical premiered on Broadway in 1891

- Music: Woolson Morse
- Lyrics: J. Cheever Goodwin
- Book: J. Cheever Goodwin
- Setting: Siam
- Premiere: May 4, 1891: Broadway Theatre
- Productions: 1891 Broadway; 1904 Broadway

Wang is a musical (the sheet music indicates "comic opera") with music by Woolson Morse and book and lyrics by J. Cheever Goodwin. It was first produced in New York in 1891 by DeWolf Hopper and his company and featured Della Fox.

The show mixed comic opera material with burlesque and was set in Siam. The music does not have "Oriental" color, except for the title character's first entrance – on a "full scale imitation elephant" – and the wedding and coronation marches. The show was termed an "operatic burletta" because of the burlesque convention of having Fox wearing tights.

== Production history ==
Wang premiered at the now-demolished Broadway Theatre, New York City, on May 4, 1891 and closed on October 3, 1891 after 151 performances. The cast featured Helen Beresford as Nannette, Della Fox as Mataya, DeWolf Hopper as Wang, Samuel Reed as Colonel Fracasse, Alfred Klein as Pepat, and Marion Singer as La Veuve Frimousse. A full-scale imitation elephant was built by Edward Siedle for Hopper to ride on during "The Man With an Elephant On His Hands."

The show was revived at the Lyric Theatre, running from April 18, 1904 through June 4, 1904, for 57 performances. The production was produced and directed by Sam S. Shubert and again starred Hopper and Singer, with Madge Lessing as Mataya.

== Songs ==
The songs in Wang (according to the published music, which varies from the song list shown at the Internet Broadway Database listing for the 1891 production) are:

- A Pretty Girl, A Summer Night – Mataya
- Are Then The Vows –
- Ask the Man in the Moon – Wang, Mataya and Colonel Fracasse
- Baby, Baby, Dance My Darling Baby
- Eminent Regent Wang – Wang and Chorus
- Every Rose Must Have Its Thorn
- If You Love Me As I Love You? (duet) – Wang and La Veuve Frimousse
- Kissing Quartet
- The Man With an Elephant On His Hands – Wang
- Mary! Mary! Why So Contrary? – Gillette and Girls
- No Matter What Others May Say (trio)
- To Be a Lone Widow – La Veuve Frimousse
- Where Are You Going My Pretty Maid? (duet) – Mataya and Marie

The song "The Man with an Elephant on his Hands" was later adapted into an unlicensed and short-lived 1905 comic strip series by Everrett E. Lowry.
