= Francis Wilson (actor) =

American actor and dramatist (1854–1935)

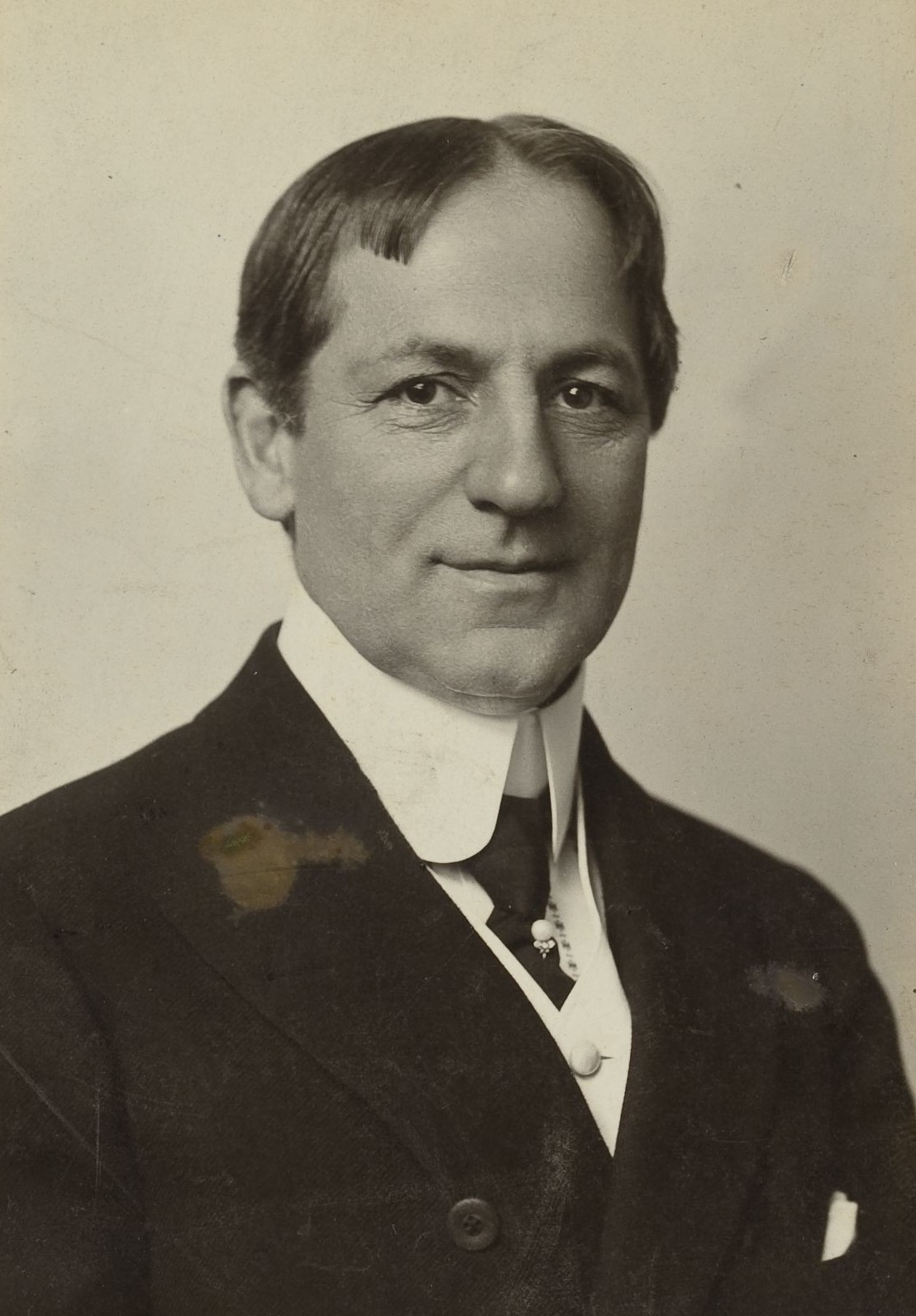
- Born: February 7, 1854; Philadelphia, Pennsylvania, U.S.
- Died: October 7, 1935 (aged 81); New York City, New York, U.S.
- Occupations: Stage actor; producer; writer
- Spouses: Mira Barrie; Edna Bruns

1st President of the Actors' Equity Association
- In office 1913–1920
- Preceded by: Office established
- Succeeded by: John Emerson

Francis B. Wilson (February 7, 1854 – October 7, 1935) was an American actor and founding president of the Actors' Equity Association.

== Early life and career ==
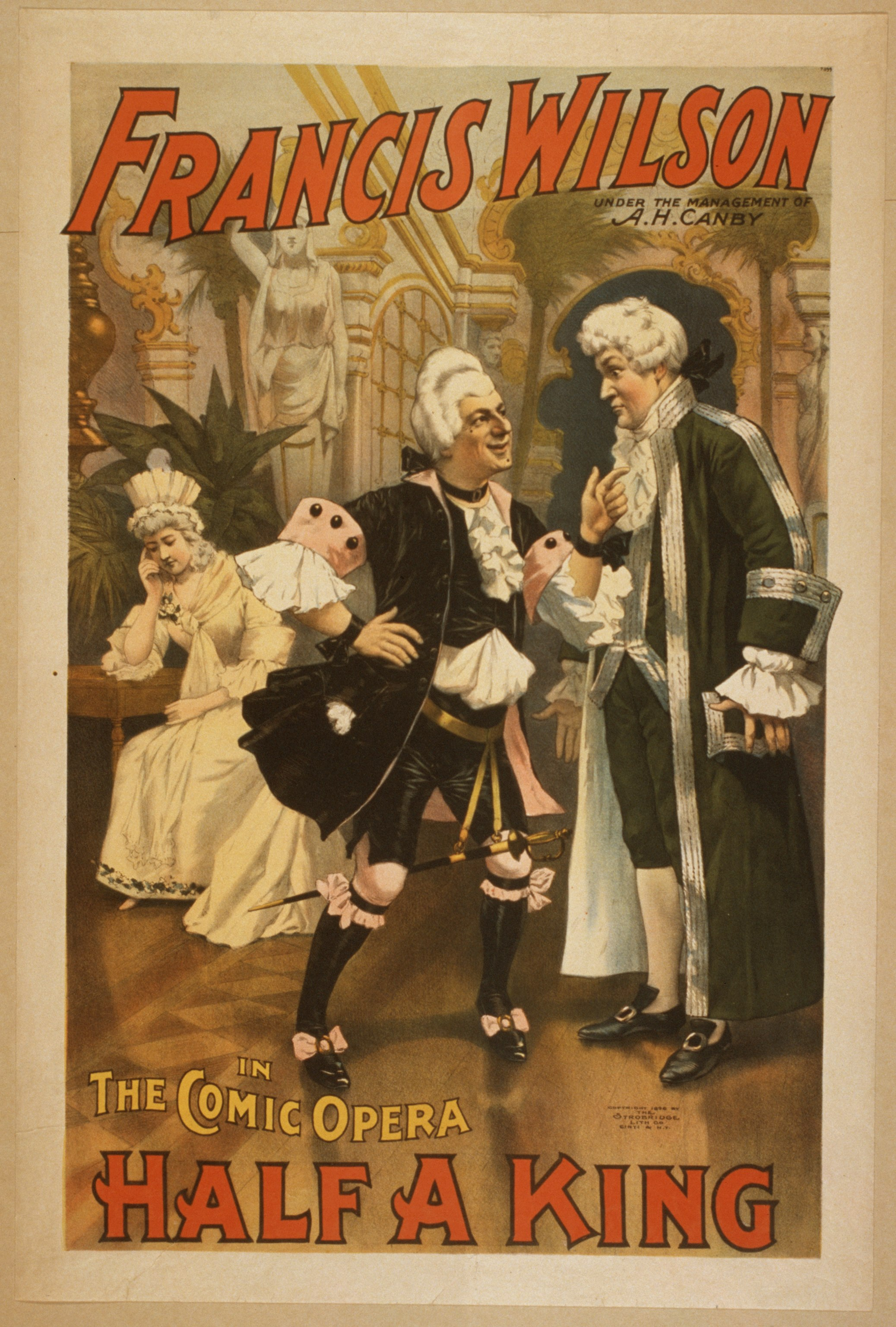
Poster for the comic opera Half a King (1896)

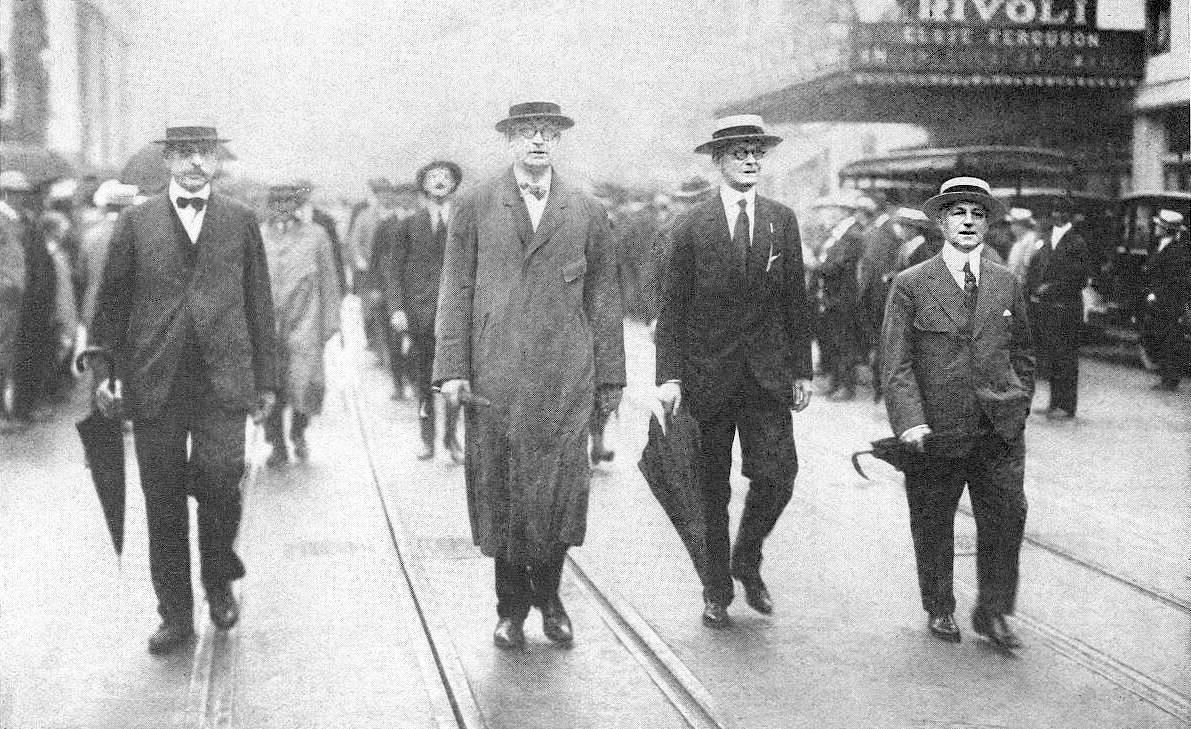
Actors' Equity president Francis Wilson (right) on parade with other leaders during the 1919 strike seeking recognition of the association as a labor union

The son of Charles E. and Emily Wilson, Francis Wilson was born in Philadelphia, Pennsylvania on February 7, 1854. He began his career at the age of ten performing under the stage name Master Johnny in Sanford's Minstrels; a blackface minstrel show then in residence in Philadelphia. His parents were Quakers who disapproved of work in the theatre, and he initially performed without their consent or knowledge by sneaking out and back into the family home. He ran away from Philadelphia as a teenager in order to pursue his career as an entertainer; initially traveling west as a part of the San Francisco Minstrels led by Birch, Wambold, & Backus.

Wilson formed a partnership with James Mackin with whom he performed as a singer and dancer in several different minstrel and variety shows before Wilson ended up rejoining the San Francisco Minstrels, this time with Mackin in tow. They then performed in Tom Maguire's minstrel show in California before spending two years in Chicago performing with Arlington, Cotton, and Kemble's Minstrels.

== Stock theatre and Mitchell's Pleasure Party ==
In 1877 Wilson permanently left his work in minstrel shows behind when he was hired by William D. Gemmill as a member of the stock theatre company at the Chestnut Street Theatre (CST) in Philadelphia. Roles he portrayed with the company in the 1877–1878 season included Farmer Banks and Lamp in Wild Oats, and Cool in London Assurance. The next year he portrayed the roles of the Judge and Templeton Fake in the road company of M'Liss with Annie Pixley leading the cast. He returned to the CST for a second year following this, but left mid-season to join the touring company of William Gill's extravaganza Our Goblins (1880) in the role of Alfred Comstock Silvermine.

After several years of performing in farces he transitioned into performing in comic operas; beginning with the role of Sir Joseph Porter in Gilbert and Sullivan's H.M.S. Pinafore. He first performed this role in San Francisco with Mitchell's Pleasure Party (MPP) in July 1882; the same company that put on Our Goblins. That same year he portrayed Mr. Oscar Myld in the MPP's production of A Gay Time at Whymple's.

== McCaull Comic Opera Company and the Casino Theatre ==
Towards the end of 1882, Wilson became a member of the McCaull Comic Opera Company (MCOC), and by December 1882 he was touring as Don Sancho d'Avellaneday in MCOC's production of The Queen's Lace Handkerchief for performances at the Academy of Music in Philadelphia, the Grand Opera House in Wilmington, Delaware, and Haverly's Theatre in Chicago. On December 30, 1882, he performed this part for the grand opening of Broadway's Casino Theatre.

Wilson remained with MCOC for three seasons during which time they often performed at the Casino Theatre. His other repertoire with this company included Balthasar Groot in Der lustige Krieg, Kolback in Falka, Prutchesko in Apajune, der Wassermann, Sigismund in Prinz Methusalem, and Trémolini in La princesse de Trébizonde. He continued to work at the Casino after parting ways with the MCOC in production's mounted by its owner, Rudolph Aronson. One of these was a highly successful production of Erminie in 1886 in which he triumphed in the role of Cadeux. The part turned into a top star on the American stage, and as his fame increased he became increasingly demanding which led to conflicts with Aronson. The conflict between the two men came to a head in 1889 and he was fired by Aronson from the Casino's production of Francis Chassaigne's Nadgy in which he portrayed Faragas.

== Francis Wilson Comic Opera Company and later career ==
When Wilson left New York's Casino Theatre in 1899 he formed the Francis Wilson Comic Opera Company. His company staged The Oolah with Wilson as its star in the role of Hoolah Goolah; a work loosely adapted from Charles Lecocq's La Jolie Persane which was a stage success. This was followed by The Merry Monarch (1890, as King Anso IV), which was adapted from Emmanuel Chabrier's opera L'étoile, and The Lion Tamer (1891, as Casimir), which was adapted from Lecocq's operetta Le Grand Casimir.

Other works starring Wilson included The Little Corporal (1898); The Strollers (1901); The Little Father of the Wilderness (1905); and The Bachelor's Baby (1909), which he also wrote. He also appeared in several productions of Rip Van Winkle, and starred in numerous revivals of Erminie.

He was the author of Joseph Jefferson: Reminiscences of a Fellow Player (1906), The Eugene Field I Knew (1898), Francis Wilson's Life of Himself (1924), and John Wilkes Booth: Fact and Fiction of Lincoln's Assassination (1929), written with information from his close friend Edwin Booth.

Wilson wrote several plays, of which The Bachelor's Baby was the most successful. He was the founding president of the Actors' Equity Association; serving in that role from 1913 until his retirement in 1920.

== Family ==
Wilson's first wife was Mira Barrie with whom he had two daughters. They married 1881. Their marriage ended upon Mira's death in 1915. Their older daughter was Frances Wilson Huard, who became a French baroness, and wrote memoirs of her life in France during World War I. In 1917 Wilson married his second wife, Edna Bruns (1879–1960), with whom he had a son and daughter.

== Francis Wilson Playhouse ==
The Francis Wilson Playhouse (FWP) in Clearwater, Florida is named after Wilson. The FWP has its roots in the Clearwater Players (CP); a repertory company which began performing in 1931. In 1935 the city of Clearwater leased the land on which the FWP now sits to the CP for the rental sum of $1.00 per year. In 1936, not long after Francis Wilson's death, Mary Louise Curtis Bok donated $5,000 for the construction of the FWP on the condition that the theatre be named after Wilson who had been her friend. The theatre had its inaugural opening on January 7, 1937.
