= Woolson Morse =

American composer

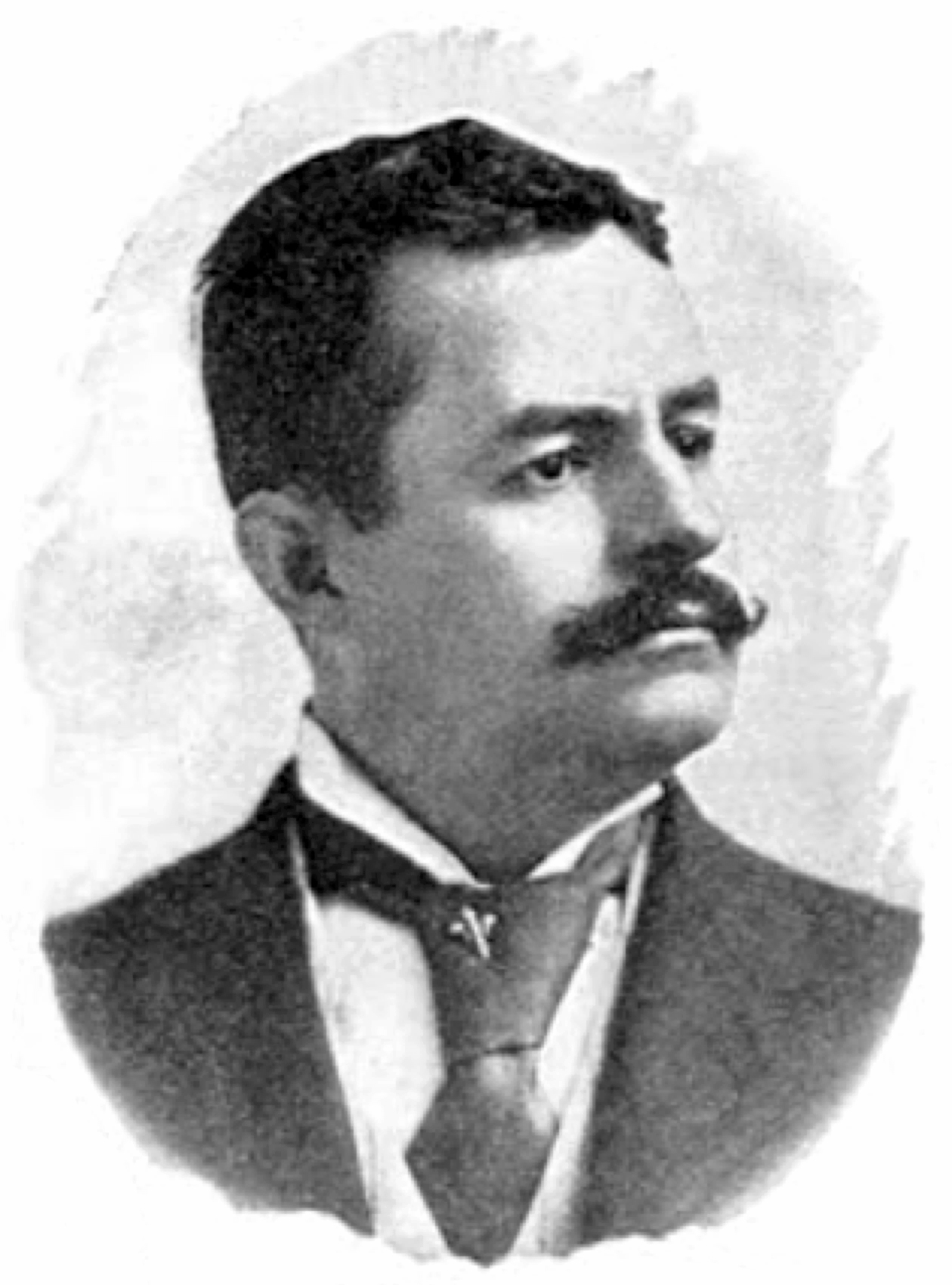
- Woolson Morse in 1895
- Born: Henry Woolson Morse; February 24, 1858; Charlestown, Boston, Massachusetts, US
- Died: May 3, 1897 (aged 39); New York City, US
- Burial place: Green-Wood Cemetery, Brooklyn, New York
- Other name: Woolson Morse
- Education: Noble School, Boston Conservatory, Massachusetts Institute of Technology
- Occupation: Broadway theatre composer
- Spouse: Agnes Cecilia Riley (m. 1893)
- Parents: Charles R. Morse (father); Mary Ann Judkins (mother)

Henry Woolson Morse (February 24, 1858 – May 3, 1897), usually credited as Woolson Morse, was an American composer of musical theatre. Often working with librettist J. Cheever Goodwin, he produced several scores for Broadway productions in the 1890s.

== Biography ==
Woolson Morse was born February 24, 1856, in Charlestown, Boston, Massachusetts. His parents were Charles R. Morse (a relative of Samuel Morse) of Vermont, and Mary Ann Judkins of Charlestown, Massachusetts. He attended secondary school at the Noble School and studied harmony at Boston Conservatory. He attended the Massachusetts Institute of Technology, then went to Paris, France, to study art. After a few years he gave that up, returned to America and took up musical composition in earnest.

=== Career ===
For his first major work, Cinderella at School, Morse borrowed scenery and convinced a group of amateurs to produce the show at Springfield, Massachusetts. Cinderella at School was produced March 5, 1881. The son of Augustin Daly related how his father became producer of the show:

Mr. Woolson Morse came to Daly with the manuscript of a musical play suggested by Thomas William Robertson's School which, in turn, had been taken from the German. Morse was without musical education, but carried in his head a number of pretty tunes. Mollenhauer, the leader of the orchestra, put the composer's idea into form and did the harmonizing and orchestrating.

In the 1880s, Morse and another Bostonian, J. Cheever Goodwin, were small part actors in various benefits for notables at Boston theaters. Moving to New York in 1887, they began to write musicals together, with Goodwin writing the librettos, producing several on Broadway in the 1890s. Their first Broadway success was Wang in 1891. According to The New York Times, "Trained in musical composition in Germany, he was one of the first wholly capable American comic-opera composers. Morse's talent so impressed W. S. Gilbert that he asked the American composer to become his collaborator after the [1890] split between Gilbert and Sullivan. Morse refused, however, and continued to compose pieces for New York production... with the aid of harmonium, at which he always wrote his music".

=== Family ===
On September 20, 1893, Morse married actress Agnes Cecilia Riley, born about 1874 in Rhode Island, daughter of Patrick Riley and Mary Ann Agnes Cunningham. She had been the youngest cast member of Wang that reopened on May 4, 1891. They shared a home at 30 West 24th Street, in Manhattan, New York.

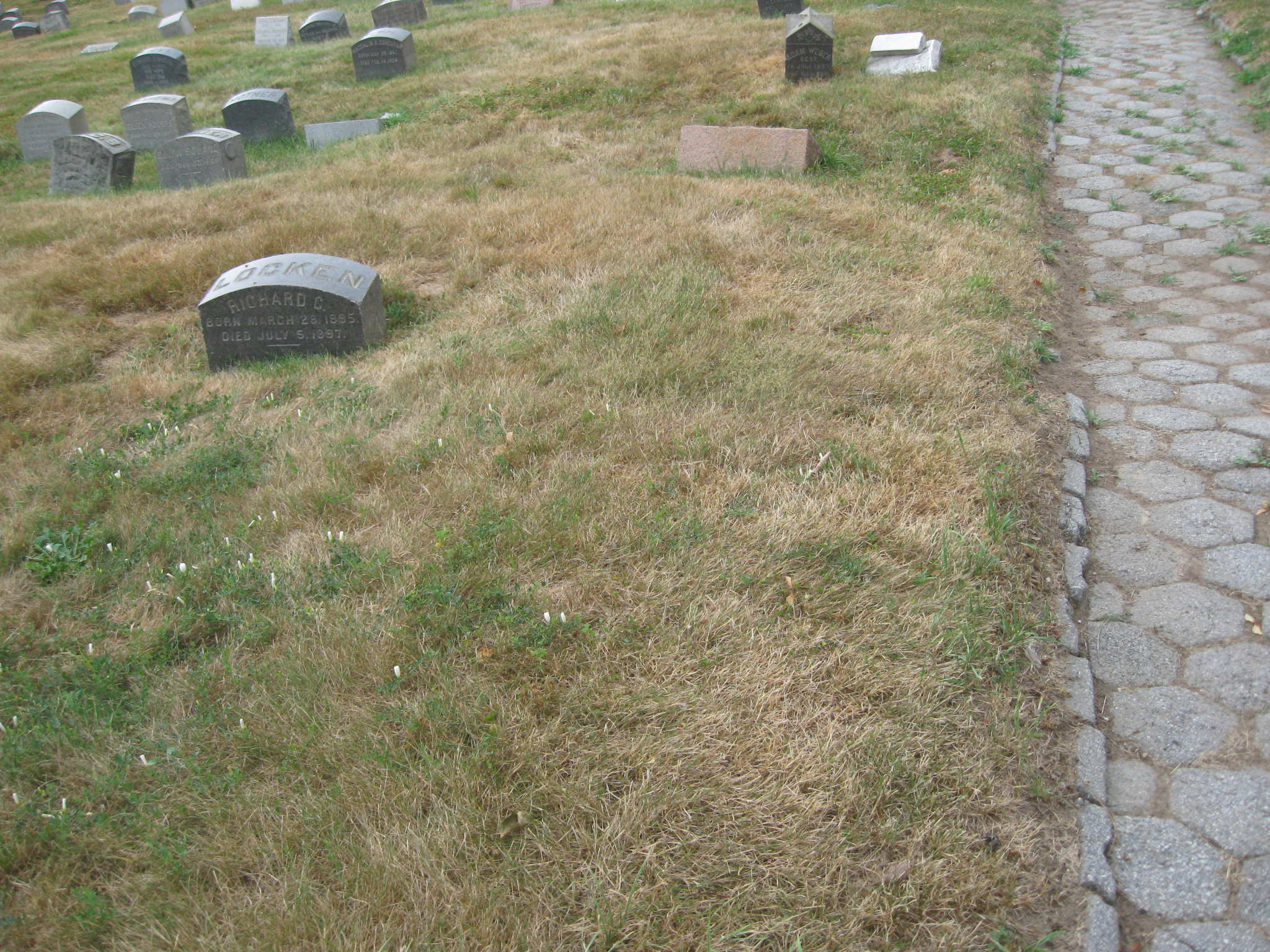
Unmarked grave of Woolson Morse (between Richard C. Locken at the left and the path at right) at Green-Wood Cemetery, Brooklyn, NY

Having suffered from stomach hemorrhages for the previous six years, Morse died on May 3, 1897, at his home in New York City. His death certificate listed the cause of death as gastric hemorrhage and cirrhoses of the liver. He is buried at Green-Wood Cemetery in Brooklyn, New York. His widow retired from the stage after an appearance in a 1904 revival of Wang. She married a surgeon, Edward Stockbridge Gushee, in 1907, and died on February 14, 1960.

== Works ==
- School, or The Charity Pupil, a musical comedy. Libretto by Morse based on Thomas William Robertson's School. 1880.
- Cinderella at School, a musical paraphrase. Libretto by the composer. 1881. (later revised as Dr. Syntax, 1894)
- Madame Piper, a musical melange. Libretto: J. Cheever Goodwin. 1884.
- The Merry Monarch (adaptation of L'etoile by Emanuel Chabrier). Libretto: J. Cheever Goodwin. 1890.
- Wang. Libretto: J. Cheever Goodwin. 1891.
- Panjandrum. Libretto: J. Cheever Goodwin. 1893.
- Dr. Syntax. Libretto: J. Cheever Goodwin. 1895 (revised version of Cinderella at School).
- Lost, Strayed or Stolen. Libretto: J. Cheever Goodwin. 1896.
- The Oolah (undated; mentioned in typescript)
- The Lion Tamer (undated; mentioned in typescript)
