= J. Cheever Goodwin =

American dramatist

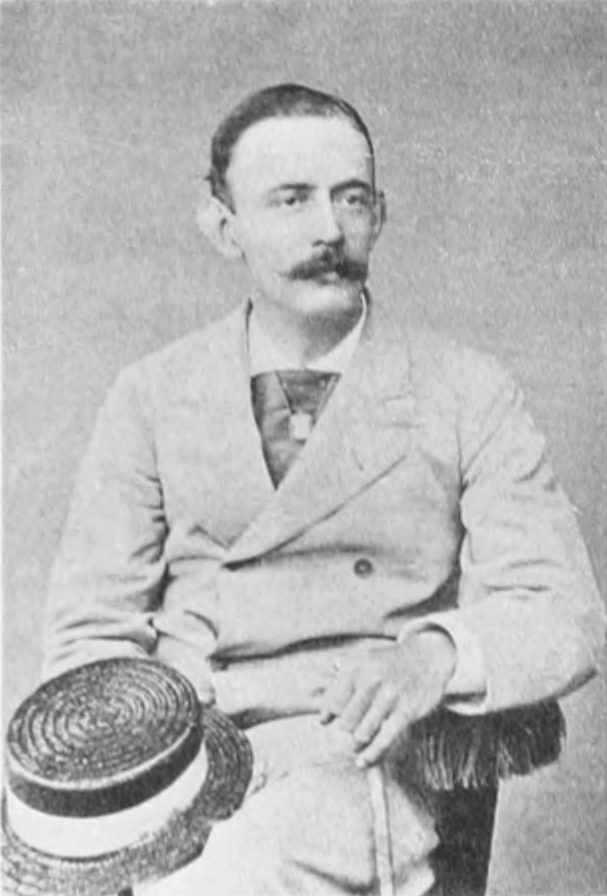
J. Cheever Goodwin

John Cheever Goodwin, better known as J. Cheever Goodwin, (July 14, 1850 – December 19, 1912) was an American musical theatre librettist, lyricist and producer.

== Life and career ==
Goodwin was born in Boston, Massachusetts, on July 14, 1850. He was educated at Harvard University, graduating in 1873. He began his career in journalism before turning to writing for the stage. Early in his theatrical career, Goodwin worked for Alice Oates, acting in her company and translating French opera bouffe into English for their productions. He often worked with composers Edward E. Rice and Woolson Morse. He was one of the earliest American writers dedicated to musical theatre librettos and lyrics. His first successful libretto was Evangeline in 1874, and his last new work was produced in 1903.

Goodwin's works included a much-revived musical adaptation, or musical burlesque, of Henry Wadsworth Longfellow's Evangeline called Evangeline; or, The Belle of Acadia (1874), composed by Rice; The Corsair (1887), with music by Rice; Jacquette (1887), with music by André Messager; Little Pig Went to Market (1890), with music by Gustave Kerker; The Merry Monarch, an English-language adaptation of L'étoile, with music by Morse (1890); a popular and well-revived piece, Wang (1891), with music by Morse, starring De Wolf Hopper; Panjandrum (1893), with music by Morse, written for and produced by Hopper's company; The Devil's Deputy (1894), music by Edward Jakobowski; A Daughter of the Revolution (1895), with music by Ludwig Engländer; Lost, Strayed or Stolen (1896), with music by Morse; 'Round New York in 80 Minutes (1899–1900), with music by Rice and John J. Braham; The Cadet Girl (1900), with music by Ludwig Engländer; The Monks of Malabar (1900), composed by Engländer; The Rogers Brothers in Central Park (1900–01), with music by Maurice Levi; The Sleeping Beauty and the Beast (1901–02), with music by Frederick Solomon; and Mr. Bluebeard (1903), with music by Solomon.

Of Lost, Strayed or Stolen, a critic commented: "Cheever Goodwin, clever at adaptation, at times a most dexterous manipulator in stagecraft, has been singularly successful in this latest venture. Starting of a delightfully humorous set of complications, woven logically together, he has made an honest translation and obtained a genuinely absurd farce which he carries through four acts, sustaining the interest to the end."

Goodwin died in New York on December 19, 1912.
