= List of operettas by John Philip Sousa =

John Philip Sousa (pictured in 1925)

John Philip Sousa was an American composer and conductor of the late Romantic era. Although primarily known for American military marches, he also wrote operettas, which are relatively lesser-known and less performed. They show influences from Gilbert and Sullivan, including short recitatives and chorus finales. According to author Paul E. Bierley, Sousa's operettas displayed a "high standard of morality". Libretti for most of the operettas were written by various prominent as well as less experienced librettists, except for The Wolf and The Bride Elect, which were written by Sousa himself. Several famous stage personalities, including DeWolf Hopper, starred in the operettas.

Sousa composed Katherine, his first operetta, in 1879, and copyrighted but never published it. His next operetta, produced after becoming the leader of the United States Marine Band, was The Smugglers, which premiered in 1882. After some financial setbacks, in the mid-1890s, he reached the epitome of his career. His operetta El Capitan was later described by author Gerald Bordman as "boding well to be the most enduring American comic opera of the nineteenth century". El Capitan portrayed the Spanish administration in Peru and became hugely popular during the Spanish–American War. His other major operettas included The Charlatan, Chris and the Wonderful Lamp, The Free Lance, and The American Maid. Bierley later speculated that, had Sousa not been the leader of the United States Marine Band, "he probably would have chosen a career in theater music".

== List of operettas ==
List of marches
Title	Year	Acts	Librettist	Notes	Premiere	Ref.
Katherine	1879	Three acts	Wilson Vance	Although Sousa never published this operetta, he copyrighted it. The only known performance from this operetta is the overture from a late 1920s Sousa Band concert.	—	
Florine	1881	Unfinished	Mary Andrews Denison	Mary Andrews Denison agreed to be the librettist for this operetta and composed several songs. However, as Denison's husband died while the first act of the operetta was still being written, Florine was never completed.	—	
The Smugglers	1882	Two acts	Wilson Vance	The Smugglers was Sousa's first operetta to be produced. The libretto is based on Arthur Sullivan and F. C. Burnand's The Contrabandista. Though it received an overall positive review, it was a financial failure.	Lincoln Hall, Washington, D.C.	
Désirée	1883	Two acts	Edward M. Taber	Sousa composed this operetta in 1882 and 1883. He based it on an English comedy, Our Wife, by John Maddison Morton.	National Theatre, Washington, D.C.	
The Queen of Hearts	1885	One act, three scenes	Edward M. Taber	The Queen of Hearts had the shortest run of all Sousa operettas, with only three performances in Washington, D.C. The operetta was compared with Gilbert and Sullivan's Trial by Jury. Several of Sousa's later compositions derived their score from the songs of this operetta.	Lafayette Square Opera House, Washington, D.C.	
The Wolf	1888	Three acts	John Philip Sousa	Sousa derived the operetta from his 1882 operetta The Smugglers. Author Paul E. Bierley calls it a "transitional" operetta; fully restored libretto.	—	
The Devil's Deputy	1893	Three acts	J. Cheever Goodwin	Comedian Francis Wilson requested Sousa to compose this operetta. However, after completion of two acts, they were unable to negotiate terms. Sousa demanded $1,500 (equivalent to $53,700 in 2025), but was offered $1,000 (equivalent to $35,800 in 2025). The Devil's Deputy was later completed and produced under Edward Jakobowski; from his own abandoned score, Sousa extracted what became the "Liberty Bell March".	—	
El Capitan	1895	Three acts	Charles Klein	El Capitan was Sousa's most successful operetta. It was a portrayal of the Spanish administration in Peru. After its premiere, it was performed various times over four years in the United States and Canada. A few of his earlier compositions like "The Legend of the Frogs" and "The Fable of the Frogs" were added to the operetta.	Tremont Theatre, Boston	
The Bride Elect	1897	Three acts	John Philip Sousa	The operetta is mostly derived from Sousa's previous operettas like The Smugglers and The Wolf. Author Paul E. Bierley attributes to The Bride Elect the "misfortune of falling in the wake of the highly successful El Capitan". Sousa's later march of the same title was more successful than the operetta.	Hyperion Theater, New Haven	
The Charlatan	1898	Three acts	Charles Klein	Sousa composed this operetta for DeWolf Hopper and his opera company. In London, The Charlatan was known as The Mystical Miss. It is one of Sousa's most famous operettas.	Academy of Music, Montreal	
Chris and the Wonderful Lamp	1899	Three acts	Glen MacDonough	Although Sousa considered this operetta one of his best works, it was not a commercial success. Sousa converted the Aladdin legend into this operetta. Sousa later extracted marches like "The Man Behind the Gun" and "Jack Tar" from it.	Hyperion Theater, New Haven	
The Free Lance	1905	Two acts	Harry B. Smith	Sousa composed this operetta in collaboration with Harry B. Smith. Although it was overall received positively, it lasted only for seven months. In late 1939, "The Goose Girl's Song", a song from this operetta, was rearranged and published as "Petit Minuet".	Court Square Theater, Springfield	
The Glass Blowers	1908	Three acts	Leonard Liebling	The operetta was completed by December 1908. It premiered as The Glass Blowers in 1913, and was renamed to The American Maid soon after for its Broadway run. Various critics commented on the length of the production. It was premiered in New York City during the Sousa Band's world tour.	Shubert Theatre, Rochester, New York	
The Irish Dragoon	1915	Three acts	Joseph W. Herbert	The manuscript of this operetta was discovered in 1965 in the basement of Sousa's estate. The libretto was based on Charles Lever's book Charles O'Malley.	—	
The Victory	1915	Unfinished (Note: The Victory was initially supposed to be a two act operetta.)	Ella Wheeler Wilcox	The Victory was initially a play by Ella Wheeler Wilcox and Ruth Allen Davis. It was scheduled to be produced in August 1915, but was never premiered.	—	

== See also ==
- List of marches by John Philip Sousa

== Works cited ==
- Allsen, J. Michael (2000) [1999]. "Sousa, John Philip". American National Biography. Oxford University Press. doi:10.1093/anb/9780198606697.article.1801080. ISBN 978-0-19-860669-7. Archived from the original on 6 November 2020.
- Bierley, Paul E. (1984). The Works of John Philip Sousa. Integrity Press. ISBN 978-0-918048-04-2. LCCN 84080665. OL 2876313M.
- Hess, Carol A. (1998). "John Philip Sousa's El Capitan: Political Appropriation and the Spanish-American War". Journal of the Society for American Music. 16 (1). University of Illinois Press: 1–24. doi:10.2307/3052673. JSTOR 3052673.
- Dietz, Dan (2021). "The American Maid". The Complete Book of 1910s Broadway Musicals. Rowman & Littlefield Publishers. ISBN 9781538150283.
- Jorgensen, Michael R. (1994). John Philip Sousa's Operetta El Capitan: A Historical, Analytical and Performance Guide (PhD thesis). Ball State University – via ProQuest.
- Keeney, Lisa (2013). "Creating a Modern Performance Edition of Sousa Operetta". Grand Valley State University.
- Kilpatrick, Barry (2021). "Sousa: Chris & the Wonderful Lamp selections; Sisterhood of the States; Showing Off Before Company". American Record Guide. Vol. 84, no. 6. ISSN 0003-0716.
- Warfield, Patrick (2011). "The March as Musical Drama and the Spectacle of John Philip Sousa" (PDF). Journal of the American Musicological Society. 64 (2): 289–318. hdl:1903/12152. JSTOR 10.1525/jams.2011.64.2.289 – via University of Maryland.
- "Liberty Bell: How Sousa, the famous composer, found a name for this popular march". The Daily Sentinel. Grand Junction, Colorado. 23 February 1899. p. 2.
