= Nella Bergen =

American singer

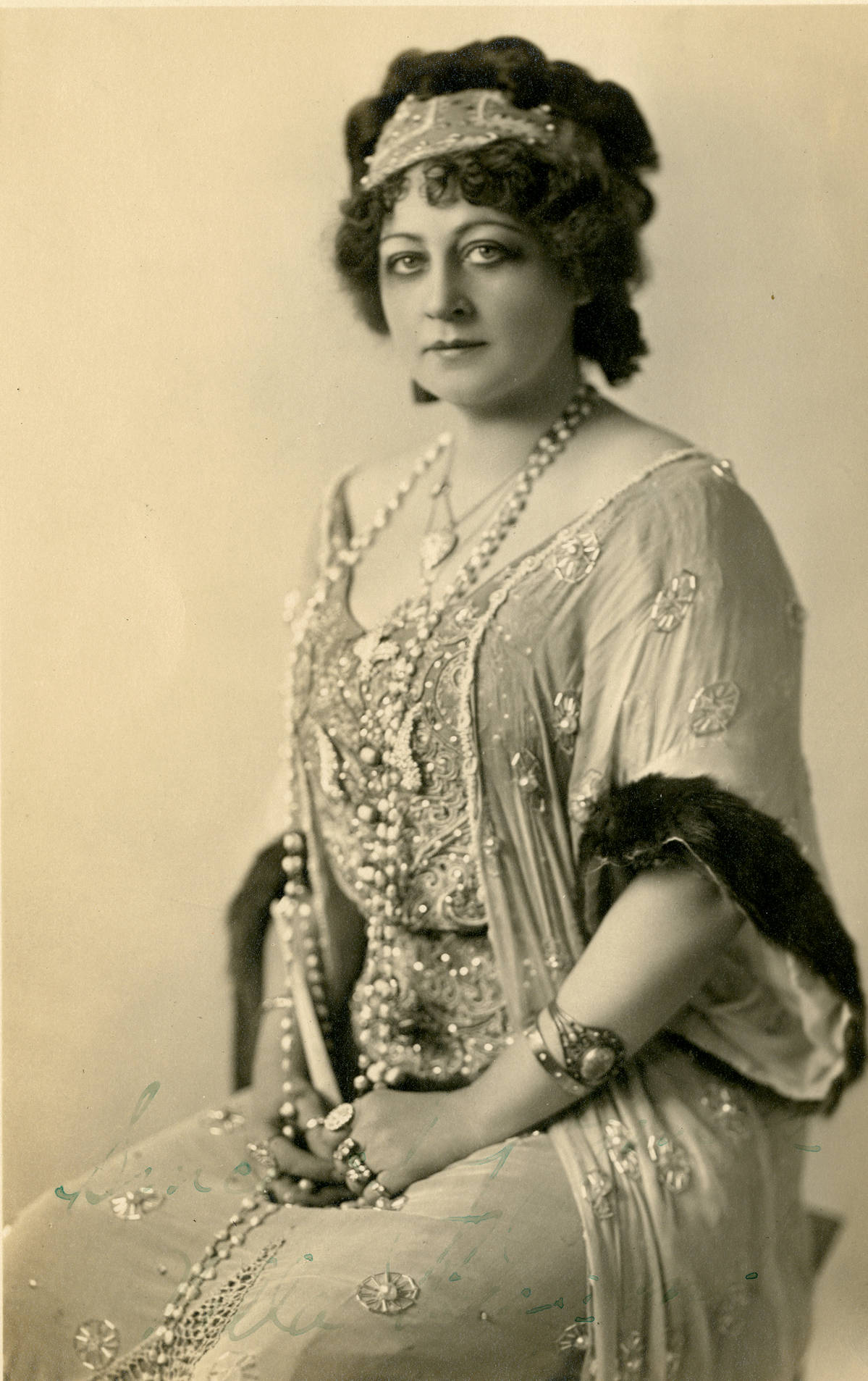
- Nella Bergen, from a 1911 photograph
- Born: Ellen G. Reardon; December 2, 1873 (or 1871); Brooklyn, New York
- Died: April 24, 1919 (aged 45); Freeport, New York
- Occupation: Actress
- Spouse(s): James Dunne Bergen (m. 1892; div. 1899) DeWolf Hopper (m. 1899; div. 1913)

Nella Bergen (December 2, 1873 (Note: Bergen's gravestone gives 1871 as her birth year.) – April 24, 1919) was an American stage actress and singer who performed in operettas on Broadway and in London at the turn into the 20th century.

== Early life and education ==
Ellen G. Reardon was born in Brooklyn, New York, the daughter of John Edward Reardon and Margaret M. Reardon. All of her grandparents were immigrants from Ireland. Her father was a police captain in Brooklyn. She studied voice with Polish-born opera singer Adelina Murio-Celli d'Elpeux.

== Career ==
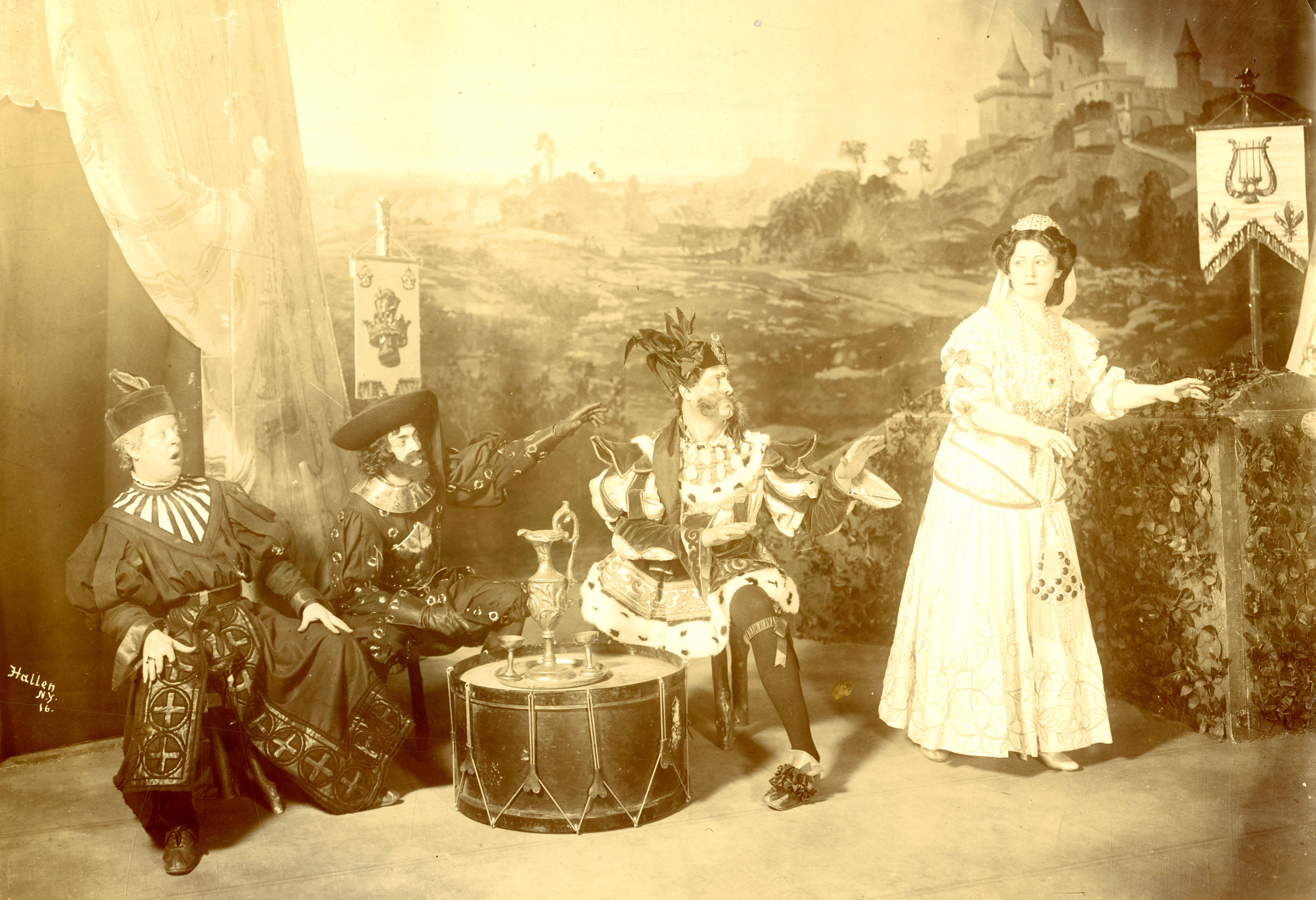
A scene from The Free Lance as performed in Seattle in 1907, featuring Bergen in a white gown, standing on the far right, and three costumed male actors seated to her right

Bergen was a church soloist as a young woman. She began her professional stage career as a soloist with the bandmaster Patrick Sarsfield Gilmore. As an actress and singer she appeared mainly in operettas, musicals, and comedies. Her Broadway credits included roles in The Charlatan (1898–1899), Baroness Fiddlesticks (1904), Wang (1904), The Free Lance (1906–1907), The Talk of New York (1907), and He Came from Milwaukee (1910).

Bergen also toured with theatrical productions, including in London performances of The Mystical Miss, El Capitan and The Charlatan in 1899. She sang at a wintertime outdoor show at a hospital for tuberculosis patients in 1909. She had one film credit, for the 1899 silent short film The Summer Girl. Her image was used to sell sheet music for popular songs.

Bergen proposed and supported the establishment of a care home for the pets of people in theatre work, whose schedules and income fluctuations could make pet care difficult or irregular. "There are no creatures on earth that suffer more than the animal pets of stage folk," she told The New York Times in 1909.

== Personal life ==
Reardon married twice. Her first husband was Connecticut manufacturer James Dunn Bergen, whose surname she used professionally; they married in 1892 and divorced in 1899. Her second husband was DeWolf Hopper; they married in 1899 and divorced in 1913, which made theirs the longest of Hopper's six marriages (his other wives included Edna Wallace Hopper and Hedda Hopper). She died from pneumonia in 1919, at the age of 45, at her home in Freeport, New York.
