= Sunshine Dad =

1916 film by Edward Dillon

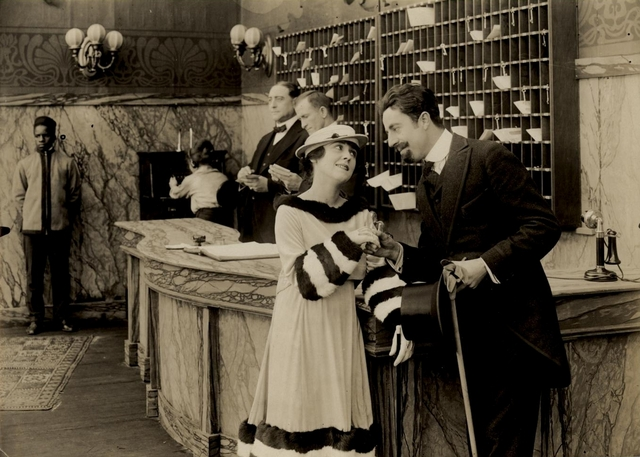
- Fay Tincher and Chester Withey
- Directed by: Edward Dillon
- Written by: Tod Browning (story); Chester Withey (story & scenario); F. M. Pierson (scenario)
- Produced by: Fine Arts Film (aka D. W. Griffith)
- Cinematography: Alfred Gosden
- Distributed by: Triangle Film Corporation
- Release date: April 23, 1916
- Running time: 5 reels
- Country: United States
- Language: Silent (English intertitles)

Sunshine Dad is a 1916 American silent comedy film produced by Fine Arts Film Company and distributed by Triangle Film Corporation. It was directed by Edward Dillon, written by Tod Browning and 'Chet' Withey and starred stage comedian DeWolf Hopper. Hopper's year old son, William, appears in the film as a baby.

The film is also known as A Knight of the Garter.

A print is preserved at the Library of Congress.

== Cast ==
- DeWolf Hopper - Alfred Evergreen
- Fay Tincher - Widow Marrimore
- Chester Withey - Count Kottschkoiff
- Max Davidson - Mystic Seer
- Raymond Wells - Mystic Doer
- Eugene Pallette - Fred Evergreen
- Jewel Carmen - Charlotte
- William Hopper - Baby
- Leo - A Lion
