= Jane Gilbert (actress) =

American actress (1919-2004)

- Born: Susan Jane Kies; August 31 1919
- Died: September 21, 2004 (aged 85)
- Occupation: Actress
- Spouse: William Hopper
- Relatives: Margaret Lindsay (sister)

Jane Gilbert (born Susan Jane Kies, August 31, 1919 – September 21, 2004) was an American actress.

== Early years ==
Gilbert was born in Dubuque, Iowa, the daughter of Mr. and Mrs. John Kies, who had four other daughters and one son. She was the sister of actress Margaret Lindsay. As a student at Dubuque High School, she participated in sports, graduating in 1937. Gilbert also studied in dramatic schools.

== Career ==
She acted in the Boothbay Stock Company in Boothbay, Maine, using the name Gilbert because people were unsure how to pronounce Kies. A 20th Century Fox scout offered her a film contract while she was appearing in Death Takes a Holiday, but she rejected it, citing a desire to gain more experience on stage. Soon afterward, she performed in What a Life in New York.

While in Maine, Gilbert did a screen test for Warner Bros. Pictures but heard no results. Eventually, she went to Hollywood, where Margaret Lindsay introduced Gilbert as her sister, Jane Lindsay. Studio officials finally realized that Jane Lindsay was the same actress as Jane Gilbert, whose screen test they found to be good. In August 1939, Gilbert signed a long-term contract with Warner Bros. As she became a member of that company, Lindsay was leaving it, possibly to avoid competing for roles with her sister, but perhaps also because she had complained about her recent treatment by the Warner Bros.

On radio, Gilbert portrayed Kathleen Carney in Bachelor's Children.

== Personal life ==
Gilbert was married to actor William Hopper, and in 1947 they had one daughter, Joan. Jane Gilbert died on September 24, 2004.
