= William Hopper =

American actor (1915–1970)

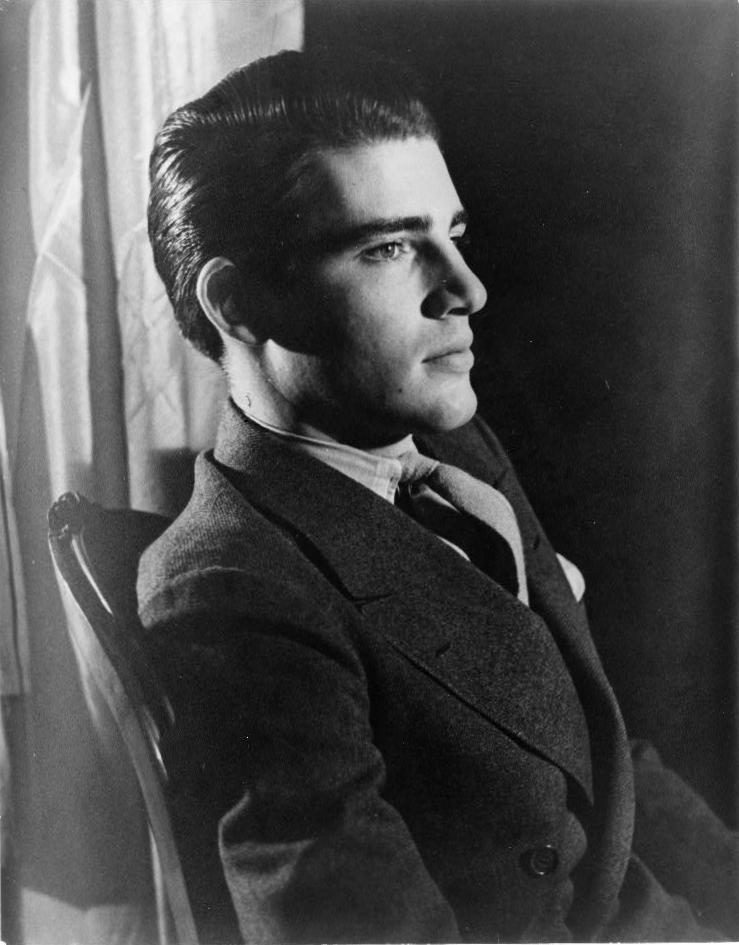
- Hopper in 1934
- Born: William DeWolf Hopper Jr. January 26, 1915; New York City, U.S.
- Died: March 6, 1970 (aged 55); Palm Springs, California, U.S.
- Resting place: Rose Hills Memorial Park
- Occupation: Actor
- Years active: 1916; 1934–1970
- Spouses: Jane Gilbert (m. 1940, divorced): Jan Hopper
- Children: 1
- Parents: DeWolf Hopper; Hedda Hopper

William DeWolf Hopper Jr. (January 26, 1915 – March 6, 1970) was an American stage, film, and television actor. The only child of actor DeWolf Hopper and actress and Hollywood columnist Hedda Hopper, he appeared in more than 80 feature films in the 1930s and 1940s. After serving in the United States Navy during World War II, he left acting, but was persuaded by director William Wellman in the 1950s to resume his film career. He is perhaps best known for his portrayal of private detective Paul Drake in the CBS television series Perry Mason.

== Early life ==
William DeWolf Hopper Jr., was born January 26, 1915, in New York City. He was the only child of actor, singer, comedian, and theatrical producer DeWolf Hopper and his fifth wife, actress Hedda Hopper (born Elda Furry). He had a half-brother, John A. Hopper, from his father's second marriage in the 1880s.

Hopper made his film debut as a baby in his father's 1916 silent movie Sunshine Dad. His mother divorced his father in 1922 and took Hopper to live in Hollywood. Hedda Hopper became a gossip columnist with nearly 30 million readers in newspapers in the U.S., and was a proponent of the Hollywood blacklist.

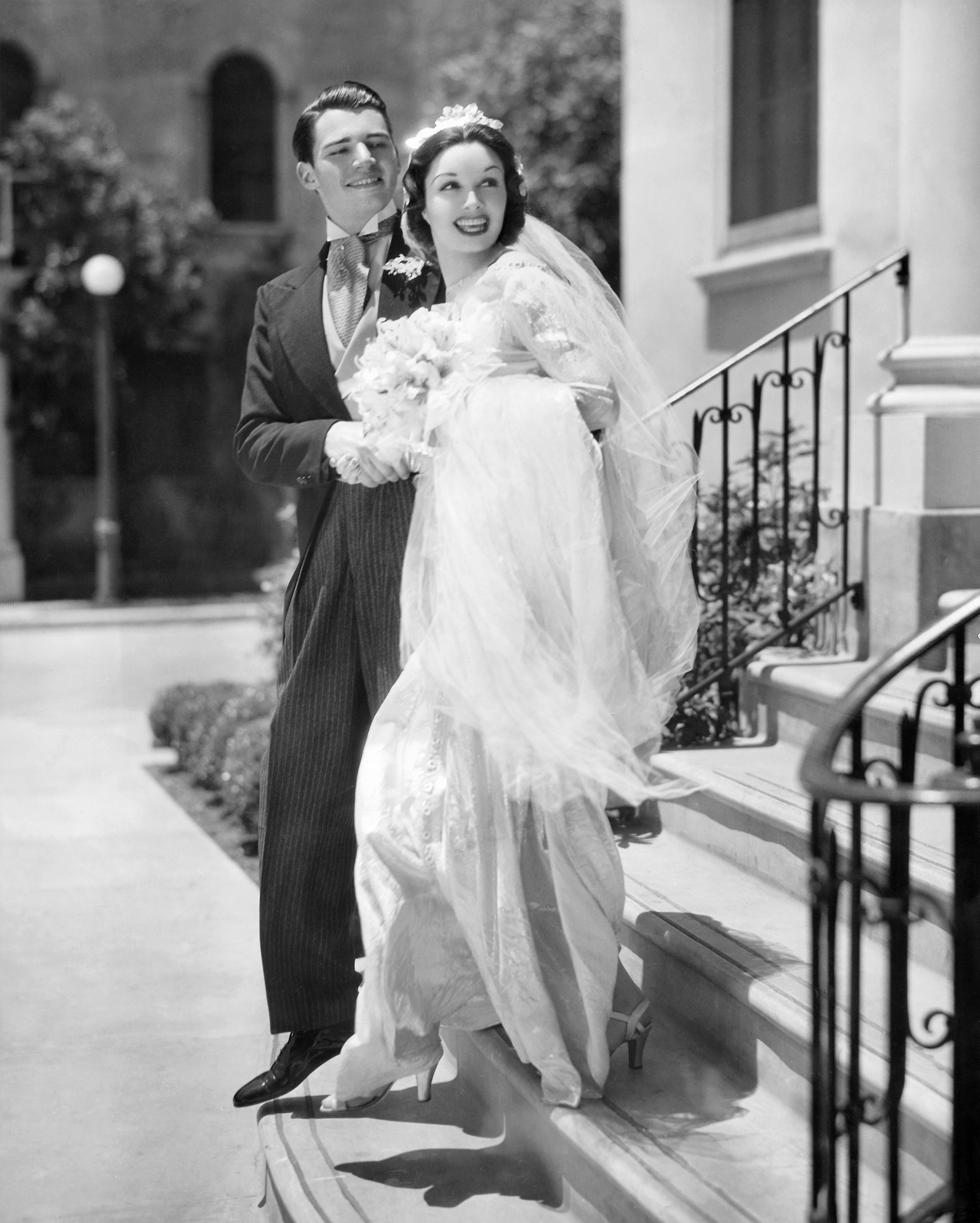
Contract players William Hopper and Gail Patrick in a July 1936 Paramount Pictures fashion photograph; 20 years later, William Hopper was Paul Drake and Gail Patrick Jackson was executive producer of the CBS-TV series Perry Mason.

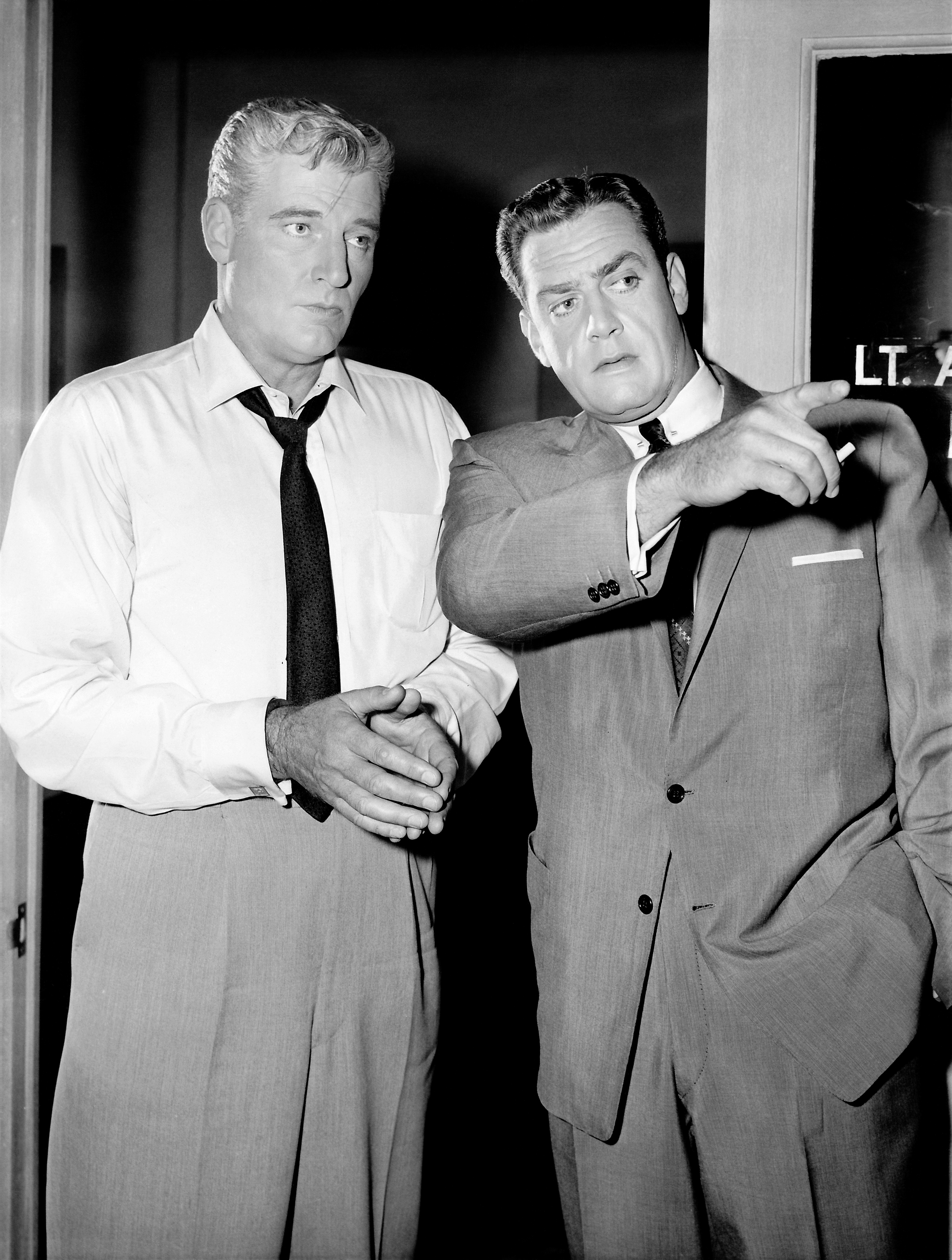
Hopper and Raymond Burr in the Perry Mason episode "The Case of Paul Drake's Dilemma" (1959)

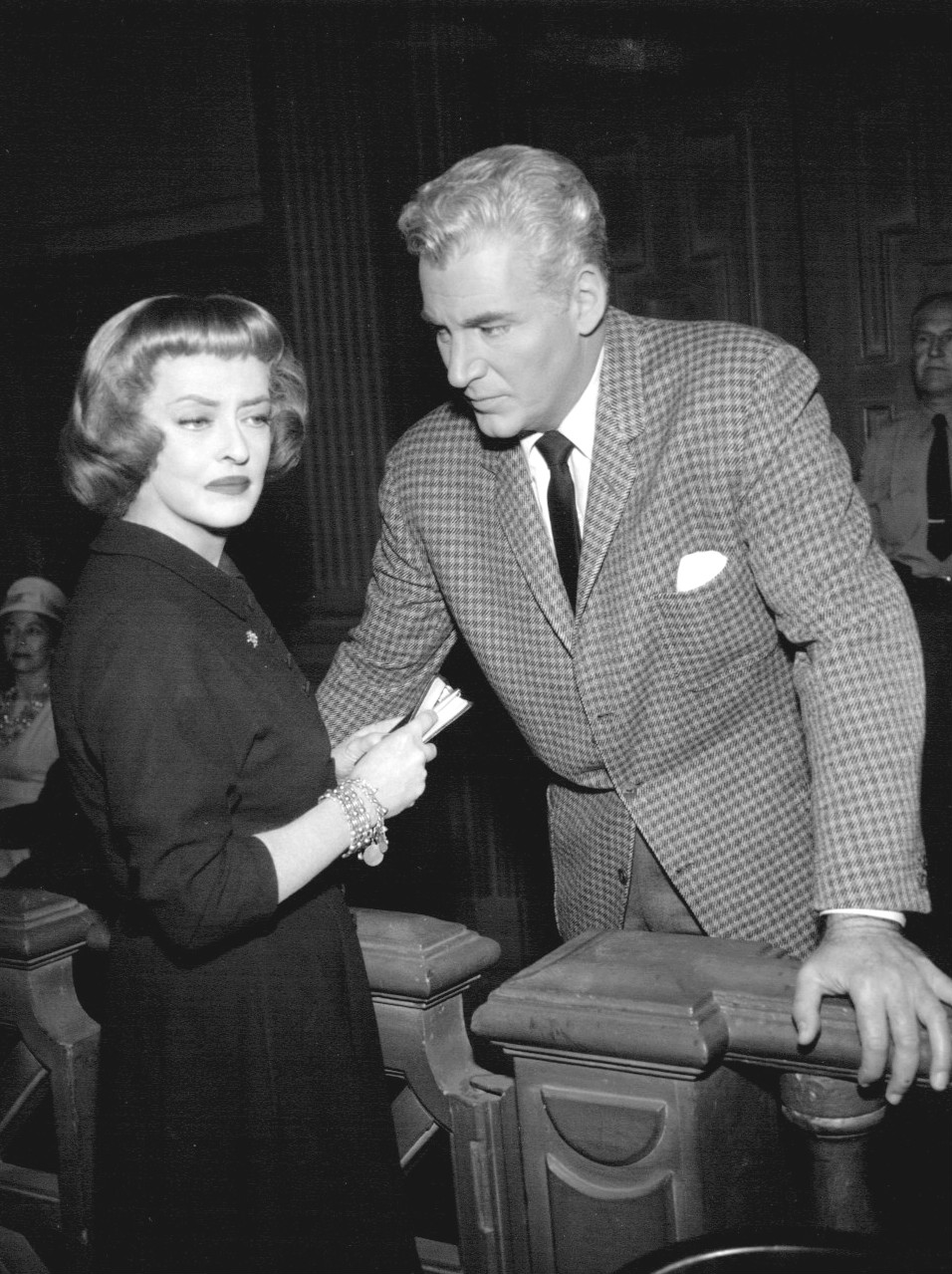
Guest star Bette Davis with Hopper in Perry Mason (1963)

== Career ==
=== 1930s–1940s ===
Hopper began his acting career as a teenager. He made his first stage appearance at the Pasadena Community Playhouse, in She Loves Me Not. He worked in summer stock in Ogunquit, Maine. He appeared on Broadway in Order Please (1934) and as a member of the ensemble in Katharine Cornell's production of Romeo and Juliet (1934–35).

In 1936, Hopper won a contract at Paramount Pictures. He was credited in movies as Wolfe Hopper and DeWolf Hopper. In 1936, he appeared in The King Steps Out, and in 1937 he was in Public Wedding, Over the Goal, The Footloose Heiress and in 1938, Mystery House.

Hopper's film roles included Stagecoach (1939), The Return of Dr. X (1939), Over the Goal (1939), Knute Rockne, All American (1940), The Maltese Falcon (1941) and Yankee Doodle Dandy (1942).

Hopper became an actor because his mother expected it of him. "When I worked at Warner Bros.," Hopper said, "I was so scared I stuttered all the time."

=== Military service and postwar career ===
Hopper served with the United States Navy during World War II, as a volunteer with the Office of Strategic Services and as a member of the newly created Underwater Demolition Team. He received a Bronze Star and several other medals during operations in the Pacific.

For eight years after the war, Hopper became involved in business and sold cars in Hollywood. He combined car sales and acting when opportunities came up during the advent of television.

"I didn't even think about acting much until a friend, director Bill Wellman, asked me to do a part in The High and the Mighty," Hopper recalled.

=== 1950s ===
In 1953, director William Wellman persuaded Hopper to resume his movie career with his 1954 film, The High and the Mighty, opposite Jan Sterling. Before filming began, Hopper challenged Wellman because he suspected his mother had arranged the offer. "When it appeared Wellman was serious, I asked him if he knew whose son I was. He ignored me," Hopper recalled. "I was so lousy, so nervous, I didn't even know where the camera was. But somehow Billy got me through. Afterward, I thanked him. He said, 'Thank me, my foot. After this, you're going to be in every picture I make.' I didn't believe him." Hopper subsequently appeared in two of Wellman's films, Track of the Cat (1954) and Good-bye, My Lady (1956).

Hopper was cast to star opposite Claire Trevor in the live television drama "No Sad Songs for Me", broadcast April 14, 1955, on NBC's Lux Video Theatre. He had such stage fright, he initially cancelled: "I swore I'd never act again as long as I lived", Hopper recalled. "Then I thought, what the heck, they can't shoot me, and walked on the set. Something happened then. It was as if someone had surgically removed the nerves."

At last comfortable on screen, Hopper played the stern and emotionally distant father of Natalie Wood in the James Dean classic Rebel Without a Cause (1955), and the absentee father in The Bad Seed (1956). He starred in the science-fiction films 20 Million Miles to Earth and The Deadly Mantis, both released in 1957.

In 1956 Hopper guest-starred again on television during the first season of the Western series Gunsmoke, portraying an outlaw initially supported by townsfolk in an episode titled "Robin Hood". He returned that year as murdering outlaw 'Tasker' in S1E38's "Unknown Grave". The following year he played a supporting role in the pilot episode of the television series The Restless Gun, which was broadcast as an episode of Schlitz Playhouse of Stars. Some of Hopper's other television guest appearances include The Joseph Cotten Show: On Trial, Fury, Studio 57, and The Millionaire.

==== Perry Mason ====
Hopper is best known for his principal role as the private investigator Paul Drake on CBS's courtroom television series Perry Mason (1957–66). He initially tested for the title role, while Raymond Burr read for the role of Mason's courtroom adversary, district attorney Hamilton Burger. Burr was encouraged to lose weight and return to audition for the role of Perry Mason – which he did, successfully. Hopper, too, was called back. Executive producer Gail Patrick Jackson recalled, "When Bill Hopper came in to read for Paul Drake he blurted out, 'You hate my mother.' And that was Hedda Hopper. Well, I disliked what she stood for, but 'hate' is something else — and anyway he was perfect as Drake, and we got him."

Wrote Brian Kelleher and Diana Merrill in their chronicle of the television series:

As Paul Drake, William Hopper was called on to be the most versatile of the principals in the Perry Mason cast. He was not only the careful investigator, the duke-it-out tough guy, the ladies' man, and the hipster, but also the fall guy, the strikeout artist, the "eating machine" and "the big kid." Hopper's Drake alone provided the comic relief for the show. And, despite being a rather late bloomer to the acting field, he played all the parts surprisingly well and believably. His appearances made fair shows good, and good shows better.

A 1959 episode, "The Case of Paul Drake's Dilemma", had Hopper's character on trial for murder.

Hopper continued to work in summer stock during his years on Perry Mason, but did not on take roles on other TV shows or in movies once Perry Mason began. After the series was cancelled in 1966, he continued to decline all other television offers. He did, though, make one final (uncredited) film appearance in a small role in Myra Breckinridge (1970), which premiered in New York three months after his death.

== Awards and honors ==
In 1959, Hopper was nominated as Best Supporting Actor (Continuing Character) in a Dramatic Series at the 11th Primetime Emmy Awards for his performance as Paul Drake.

== Personal life ==
In 1940, Hopper married actress Jane Gilbert. They had worked together on the 1939 film Invisible Stripes. The couple had one daughter, Joan.

In September 1962, TV Guide magazine reported that Hopper and Gilbert had separated. They later divorced, and Hopper married Jeanette Juanita Ward. They remained together until his death.

== Death ==
Hopper entered Desert Hospital in Palm Springs, California, on February 14, 1970, after suffering a stroke. He died of pneumonia three weeks later, on March 6, at the age of 55. He was buried in Rose Hills Memorial Park in Whittier, California.

== Broadway ==
- 1934: Order Please, Playhouse Theatre (as Victor Neilson)
- 1934–35: Romeo and Juliet, Martin Beck Theatre (Ensemble)

== Filmography ==
=== Film ===
| Year | Title | Role | Notes |
|---|---|---|---|
| 1916 | Sunshine Dad | Baby | Credited as William DeWolf Hopper Jr. |
| 1936 | The King Steps Out | Soldier | Offscreen credit |
| 1936 | Murder with Pictures | Photographer | Offscreen credit as DeWolf Hopper |
| 1936 | The Big Broadcast of 1937 | Ship's Officer | Uncredited |
| 1936 | Easy to Take | Monitor room man | Offscreen credit as DeWolf Hopper |
| 1936 | The Accusing Finger | Reporter | Offscreen credit as DeWolf Hopper |
| 1936 | Beware of Ladies | Reporter | Uncredited |
| 1937 | Larceny on the Air | Announcer | Credited as DeWolf Hopper |
| 1937 | Join the Marines | Marine | Uncredited |
| 1937 | Dick Tracy | Dirigible Pilot | Uncredited |
| 1937 | Public Wedding | Tony Burke | Male lead, opposite Jane Wyman |
| 1937 | Mr. Dodd Takes the Air | Second production manager | Uncredited |
| 1937 | The Footloose Heiress | Jack Pierson | |
| 1937 | Back in Circulation | Pete Edington | Offscreen credit |
| 1937 | Love Is on the Air | Eddie Gould | |
| 1937 | Over the Goal | Ken Thomas | Male lead, opposite June Travis |
| 1937 | The Adventurous Blonde | Matt | |
| 1938 | Daredevil Drivers | Neeley bus driver | Offscreen credit |
| 1938 | Love, Honor and Behave | Yale tennis player | Offscreen credit |
| 1938 | Mystery House | Lal Killian | |
| 1938 | The Patient in Room 18 | Grabshot | Offscreen credit |
| 1938 | Women Are Like That | Larraby | Offscreen credit |
| 1939 | Stagecoach | Cavalry Sergeant | Offscreen credit |
| 1939 | Midnight | Flammarions' Party Guest | Uncredited |
| 1939 | Daughters Courageous | Striped-shirted man at beach | Offscreen credit |
| 1939 | The Cowboy Quarterback | Handsome Sam | Offscreen credit as DeWolf Hopper |
| 1939 | The Old Maid | John | Credited as DeWolf Hopper |
| 1939 | The Angels Wash Their Faces | Photographer | Uncredited |
| 1939 | Nancy Drew and the Hidden Staircase | Reporter | Offscreen credit as DeWolf Hopper |
| 1939 | Dust Be My Destiny | Reporter | Uncredited |
| 1939 | Espionage Agent | Student | Offscreen credit |
| 1939 | On Your Toes | Ronald – Peggy's Escort | Offscreen credit as DeWolfe Hopper |
| 1939 | Pride of the Blue Grass | Joe | Credited as DeWolf Hopper |
| 1939 | On Dress Parade | Soldier Getting Radio Report from H4 | Uncredited |
| 1939 | The Return of Doctor X | Intern | Credited as DeWolf Hopper |
| 1939 | A Child Is Born | Intern | Offscreen credit as DeWolfe Hopper |
| 1939 | Invisible Stripes | Young Man | Offscreen credit as DeWolfe Hopper |
| 1940 | The Fighting 69th | Private Turner | Credited as DeWolf Hopper |
| 1940 | Calling Philo Vance | Hotel clerk | Offscreen credit as DeWolfe Hopper |
| 1940 | Castle on the Hudson | Reporter | Offscreen credit as DeWolfe Hopper |
| 1940 | Virginia City | Lieutenant | Offscreen credit as DeWolfe Hopper |
| 1940 | 'Til We Meet Again | Man | Uncredited |
| 1940 | Tear Gas Squad | George | Credited as DeWolf Hopper |
| 1940 | Flight Angels | Lefty | Credited as DeWolfe Hopper |
| 1940 | Brother Orchid | Reporter | Offscreen credit as DeWolfe Hopper |
| 1940 | Gambling on the High Seas | Station operator | Offscreen credit as DeWolfe Hopper |
| 1940 | The Man Who Talked Too Much | Reporter | Offscreen credit as DeWolfe Hopper |
| 1940 | Ladies Must Live | Joe Barton | Credited as DeWolf Hopper |
| 1940 | Money and the Woman | J.L. Burns, Bank Depositor | Offscreen credit as DeWolfe Hopper |
| 1940 | No Time for Comedy | First-Nighter | Uncredited |
| 1940 | Knute Rockne, All American | Reporter | Offscreen credit as DeWolfe Hopper |
| 1940 | Always a Bride | Man at campaign meeting carrying Michael | Offscreen credit as DeWolfe Hopper |
| 1940 | Lady with Red Hair | Lyceum Theater Attendant | Uncredited |
| 1940 | Santa Fe Trail | Officer | Scenes deleted; offscreen credit as DeWolfe Hopper |
| 1941 | The Case of the Black Parrot | Second mate | Offscreen credit as DeWolfe Hopper |
| 1941 | Flight from Destiny | Travin | Credited as DeWolf Hopper |
| 1941 | Footsteps in the Dark | Police secretary | Offscreen credit as DeWolfe Hopper |
| 1941 | Here Comes Happiness | Best Man | Offscreen credit as DeWolfe Hopper |
| 1941 | Knockout | Reporter | Offscreen credit as DeWolfe Hopper |
| 1941 | A Shot in the Dark | Jones | Offscreen credit as DeWolfe Hopper |
| 1941 | Strange Alibi | Desk clerk | Offscreen credit as Bill Hopper |
| 1941 | Affectionately Yours | Airline attendant | Offscreen credit as DeWolfe Hopper |
| 1941 | The Bride Came C.O.D. | Keenan's pilot | Credited as DeWolf Hopper |
| 1941 | Bullets for O'Hara | Richard Palmer | Credited as DeWolf Hopper |
| 1941 | Highway West | Frank Carson – Murdered Cashier | Uncredited |
| 1941 | Manpower | Power company telephone operator | Offscreen credit as DeWolfe Hopper |
| 1941 | Dive Bomber | Pilot | Offscreen credit as DeWolf Hopper |
| 1941 | International Squadron | Radio operator | Offscreen credit as DeWolfe Hopper |
| 1941 | Passage from Hong Kong | Watson | Offscreen credit as DeWolfe Hopper |
| 1941 | Navy Blues | Ensign Walters | Offscreen credit as DeWolfe Hopper |
| 1941 | The Maltese Falcon | Reporter | Offscreen credit as Bill Hopper |
| 1941 | Blues in the Night | Billiard Player | Offscreen credit as Bill Hopper |
| 1941 | They Died with Their Boots On | Lt. Frazier | Offscreen credit as DeWolfe Hopper |
| 1941 | The Body Disappears | Terrence Abbott | Offscreen credit as DeWolf Hopper |
| 1941 | You're in the Army Now | Clerk | Offscreen credit as DeWolfe Hopper |
| 1942 | All Through the Night | Reporter | Offscreen credit as DeWolfe Hopper |
| 1942 | Bullet Scars | Reporter | Offscreen credit |
| 1942 | The Male Animal | Reporter | Offscreen credit as DeWolfe Hopper |
| 1942 | Lady Gangster | John | Credited as DeWolf Hopper |
| 1942 | Murder in the Big House | Reporter | Offscreen credit as DeWolfe Hopper |
| 1942 | Larceny, Inc. | Customer | Offscreen credit as DeWolfe Hopper |
| 1942 | Yankee Doodle Dandy | Reporter | Offscreen credit |
| 1942 | Juke Girl | Atlanta Postal Clerk | Offscreen credit as DeWolfe Hopper |
| 1942 | Spy Ship | Reporter | Offscreen credit as Bill Hopper |
| 1942 | Escape from Crime | Reporter | Offscreen credit |
| 1942 | Secret Enemies | Ensign | Offscreen credit as Bill Hopper |
| 1942 | Busses Roar | Sailor | Offscreen credit |
| 1942 | Across the Pacific | Orderly | Offscreen credit |
| 1942 | Desperate Journey | Aircraftsman | Offscreen credit as DeWolfe Hopper |
| 1942 | You Can't Escape Forever | Soldier | Offscreen credit as Bill Hopper |
| 1942 | Beyond the Line of Duty | University of Texas classmate | Short film, uncredited |
| 1942 | Gentleman Jim | Undetermined Role | Offscreen credit as DeWolf Hopper |
| 1943 | The Hard Way | Hotel Desk Clerk | Offscreen credit as Bill Hopper |
| 1943 | The Mysterious Doctor | Orderly | Credited as DeWolfe Hopper |
| 1943 | Air Force | Sergeant | Offscreen credit |
| 1943 | Truck Busters | Trucker | Offscreen credit as Bill Hopper |
| 1943 | Action in the North Atlantic | Canadian soldier | Offscreen credit as DeWolfe Hopper |
| 1943 | Murder on the Waterfront | First sentry | Offscreen credit as DeWolf Hopper |
| 1944 | The Last Ride | Swank | Offscreen credit |
| 1954 | The High and the Mighty | Roy | Offscreen credit as William DeWolf Hopper |
| 1954 | Sitting Bull | Charles Wentworth | Offscreen credit as Bill Hopper |
| 1954 | This Is My Love | District Attorney | Offscreen credit |
| 1954 | Track of the Cat | Arthur Bridges | Offscreen credit |
| 1955 | Conquest of Space | Dr. George Fenton | |
| 1955 | Robbers' Roost | Robert Bell | Offscreen credit |
| 1955 | One Desire | Mac McBain | |
| 1955 | Rebel Without a Cause | Judy's father | |
| 1956 | Good-bye, My Lady | Walden Grover | |
| 1956 | The First Texan | William B. Travis | |
| 1956 | The Bad Seed | Col. Kenneth Penmark | |
| 1957 | The Deadly Mantis | Dr. Nedrick (Ned) Jackson | |
| 1957 | 20 Million Miles to Earth | Col. Bob Calder | |
| 1957 | Slim Carter | Joe Brewster | |
| 1970 | Myra Breckinridge | Judge Frederic D. Cannon | Uncredited; Released posthumously |

=== Television ===
| Year | Title | Role | Notes |
|---|---|---|---|
| 1954 | Mayor of the Town | Girard | "Minnie's Job" |
| 1955 | Lux Video Theatre | Brad Scott | "No Sad Songs for Me" |
| 1955 | Ford Theatre | Joe Cramer | "The Mumbys" |
| 1955 | Lux Video Theatre | Host | "Perilous Deception" |
| 1955 | Warner Brothers Presents … Casablanca | Wilson Randall | "Labor Camp Escape" |
| 1956 | Fury | Sam Wilson | "The Hobo" (credited as Bill Hopper) |
| 1956 | The 20th Century Fox Hour | Phil Harland | "One Life" |
| 1956 | Gunsmoke | John Henry Jordan | "Robin Hood" |
| 1956 | Lux Video Theatre | Jim Johanson | "The Star" |
| 1956 | Celebrity Playhouse | | "Stagecoach to Paradise" |
| 1956 | The Millionaire | Capt. Jonathan Carroll | "Captain Jonathan Carroll" |
| 1956 | Gunsmoke | Tasker Sloane | "Unmarked Grave" |
| 1956 | Lux Video Theatre | George | "The Top Rung" |
| 1956 | Jane Wyman Presents The Fireside Theatre | Rick Gordon | "Ten Percent" |
| 1956 | Matinee Theater | | "Madame de Treymes" |
| 1956 | Studio 57 | Smith | "The Magic Glass" |
| 1957 | Studio 57 | Kip | "Mr. November" |
| 1957 | Schlitz Playhouse of Stars | Dan Mailer | "The Restless Gun" (pilot for TV series) |
| 1957 | The Joseph Cotten Show | Arnold Bait | "The Case of the Jealous Bomber" |
| 1957–1966 | Perry Mason | Paul Drake | 271 episodes |
