= Edna McClure =

American actress

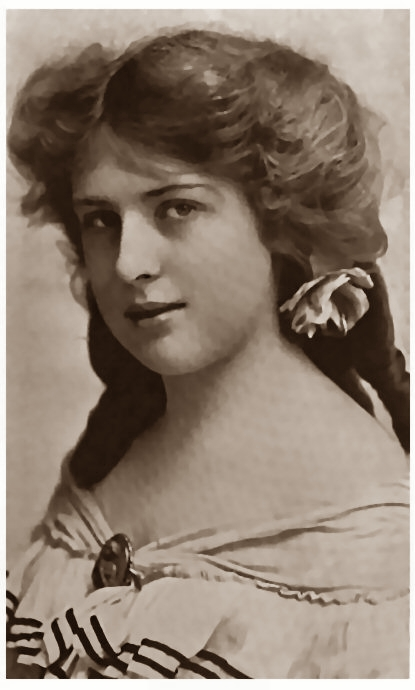
Edna McClure Burr McIntosh Monthly, 1904

Edna McClure (born c. 1888) was an American actress whose brief career on Broadway was overshadowed by a sensational murder case and later a tragic family dispute.

== Life and career ==
McClure was born in California around 1888, the only child of Henry McClure and Amy Hodges. Her father, a building site contractor, was born in Vermont to Scottish immigrants, while her mother was a native Californian whose family originally came from the Carolinas.

She first appeared on Broadway at an early age as Elsie Habbicombe in the 1904 musical comedy The Medal and the Maid and a bit later that year as Monty in The Baroness Fiddlesticks. In January 1905 she appeared in the short-lived comedy The Money Makers, and two months later as the wife of General Butin in a burlesque production of the C. M. S. McLellan melodrama Leah Kleschna. McClure returned to San Francisco not long afterwards to attend classes at Caldwell College of Oratory and Acting. She came back to Broadway in August 1906 to play Eleanor in a successful run of the comedy play The Tourist. At some point during her time in New York, McClure fell into the orbit of friends surrounding the model turned actress Evelyn Nesbit and her millionaire husband, Harry Kendall Thaw.

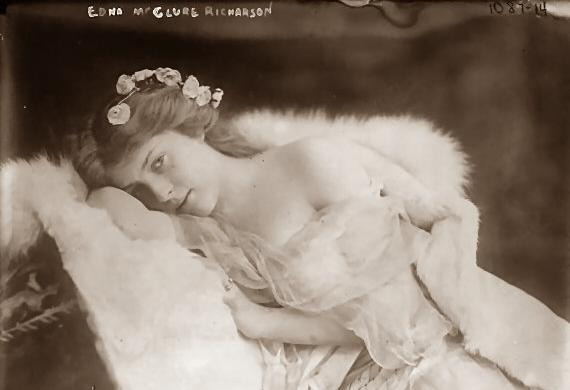
Edna McClure c. 1906–1910 Library of Congress

On the night of June 25, 1906, Thaw shot dead the noted architect Stanford White at the rooftop restaurant atop Madison Square Garden during a performance of the Edgar Allan Woolf musical comedy Mam'zelle Champagne. McClure reportedly told police investigators that over the two years leading up to White’s murder she had frequently witnessed Thaw fly into a rage over the mention of his wife’s former lover, and that she seemed to encourage these outbursts by urging him to do something. During Thaw’s trial the prosecution’s decision not to call McClure to testify prompted the press to name her the 'will ‘o wisp witness' of the trial. Thaw was later sent to the Matteawan State Hospital for the Criminally Insane, initially for life, but was released in 1913 after only five years confinement.

On December 1, 1906, McClure married John G. Richardson, a young entrepreneur involved at the time with a mining venture in Tonopah, Nevada. The couple, who had only known each other a few weeks before marrying, divorced in December 1910 after separating the year before.

Some months after the White murder, McClure joined the Frank Bacon stock company at the Theatre Jose in San Jose, California, in a dramatization of the Archibald Clavering Gunter novel Mr. Barnes of New York. During this time McClure would attempt suicide twice. The first attempt was with laudanum at the Bristol Hotel in San Jose, and the second, in September 1907, was by ingesting a cocaine solution at her parents’ home in San Francisco. Though McClure was never forthcoming about what had driven her to attempt suicide, the press at the time speculated that family pressure to leave the stage was responsible for her depression.

McClure's last performances on Broadway came in September 1911 at the Bijou Theatre in the short-lived play Modern Marriage by Harrison Rhodes, and thirteen years later (as Edna M. Chamberlain) playing Buria in The Warrior's Husband, a comedy by Julia F. Thompson that closed after a single performance at the Belasco Theatre.

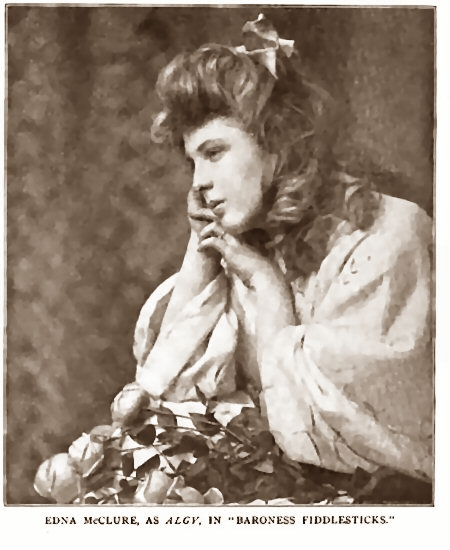
Edna McClure Everybody's Magazine, 1904

Around this time McClure married Gordon S. Chamberlin, a contractor and business associate of her father. A daughter and two sons were born to this union before Chamberlin was fatally injured while inspecting a San Francisco construction site in June 1931.

In 1934 a dispute arose between McClure and her 24-year-old daughter Amy over an uncle’s $40,000 estate. During a heated exchange McClure shot her daughter several times with a hand gun, wounding her in the mouth, neck and shoulder. Amy survived and McClure was later found guilty of assault with a deadly weapon (reduced from attempted murder) and given one year probation with the proviso that she and her daughter have no further contact with each other. The judge in the case actually chastised her daughter for filing charges, telling her: "A man would not have done it."

From this point on Edna McClure appears to vanish from the public eye.

In 1904 Burr McIntosh Monthly wrote of McClure’s potential;

Edna McClure is a little girl who is just beginning her theatrical career, and is at present one of the attractive features in "The Baroness Fiddlesticks." That Miss McClure is an attractive photographic subject cannot be denied, and that she has a future as an actress is admitted by all who have seen her on the stage.
