= Albert Oldfield Brown =

American show business manager (1872–1945)

A. O. Brown
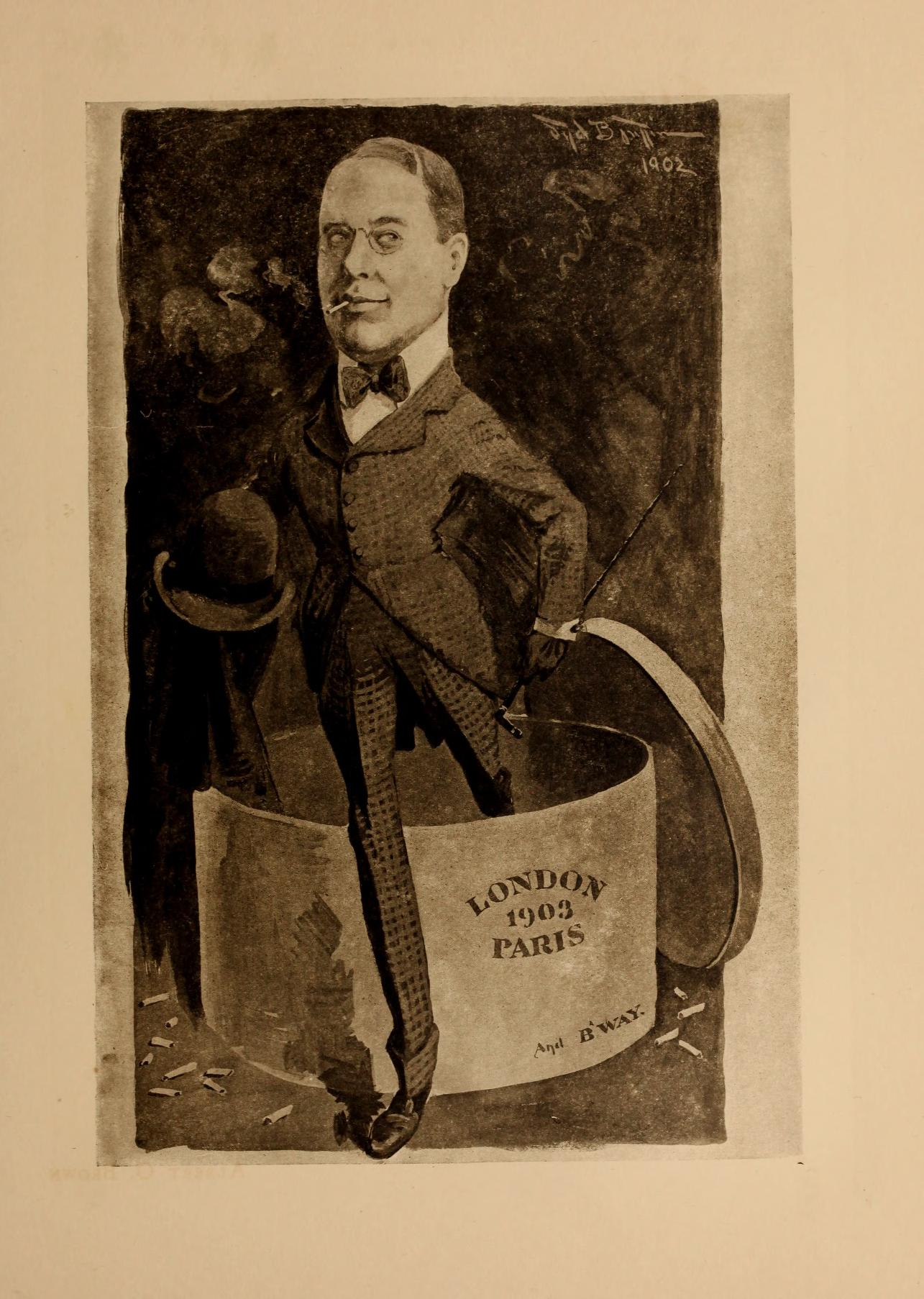
- A. O. Brown Wall Street caricature (1902)

Shepherd of The Lambs
- In office 1921-24 – 1930-32
- Preceded by: R. H. Burnside
- Succeeded by: Thomas Meighan

Personal details
- Born: Albert Oldfield Brown; December 30, 1872 Elizabeth, New Jersey
- Died: March 5, 1945 (aged 72) New York, New York
- Resting place: Green-Wood Cemetery, Brooklyn, NY
- Spouse(s): Mary Arents (1894), Edna Wallace Hopper (1908)
- Occupation: Theater Manager

Albert Oldfield Brown (December 30, 1872 – March 5, 1945), known professionally as A. O. Brown, was a stockbroker, Broadway manager, and a Shepherd (president) of The Lambs from 1921 to 1924 and again from 1930 to 1932. He was president of the Percy Williams Home for Retired Actors and Actresses.

== Biography ==
He was born on December 30, 1872, in Elizabeth, New Jersey. He married Mary Arents in 1891.

His first job was as a clerk at the Real Estate Trust Company. He then worked as a cashier at the American Tobacco Company. In 1902 he formed the A. O. Brown brokerage firm but he went bankrupt in the Panic of 1907.

In November 1908 he married Edna Wallace Hopper.

He died on March 5, 1945, at Columbia-Presbyterian Hospital in Manhattan, New York City.
