= The Smugglers (operetta) =

1881 operetta by John Philip Sousa

Concept art for The Smugglers

The Smugglers, composed in 1881, was the first fully produced operetta with music composed by John Philip Sousa.

The libretto was written by Wilson Vance, a friend of his, who also wrote the libretto to another Sousa operetta Katherine (1879), which was never produced.The Smugglers consists of two acts. It was based on the Arthur Sullivan and F. C. Burnand opera The Contrabandista.

Two versions of The Smugglers were produced. An 1881 edition and a 1882 revision. The original 1881 edition libretto has been lost. However, the 1882 revision libretto, which was also once considered lost is located at Bowling Green State University, Ohio, in the Wilson Vance papers. The libretto has been copied and transcribed for easier reading by Arthur O'Dwyer in 2025. The vocal score was published by W. F. Shaw, Philadelphia, in 1881.

Cover of the published libretto to "The Smugglers" composed by John Philip Sousa

== Productions ==
The operetta was first produced on March 25, 1882, at Lincoln Hall in Washington, D.C. The audience enjoyed it, and the production included the local National Rifles group for the "Soldier's Chorus". The performance was assisted by the Operatic Association of Washington D.C. Afterwards, the show went on a brief tour but ended in financial failure for Sousa.

== Reviews ==
The The Washington Star wrote in an article about the performance in 1882: "The Smugglers will be performed at Lincoln Hall tomorrow night on the occasion of a complimentary benefit to the composers, Messrs. Vance and Sousa. The cast is very strong and the performance promises to be a spirited affair."

The arias from the production were described as "bright, sparkling, and "catchy"". The libretto and music were said to be "original and attractive".

== Roles ==
Roles, Lincoln Hall Cast
Role	1882 Lincoln Hall cast
Tito, a smuggler (baritone)	
Mateo, a smuggler (bass)	
Enrique, Violante's beau (tenor)	
Stubbs, a tourist (tenor)	
Captian of the Gaurd (baritone)	
Violante, a kidnapped maiden (soprano)	
Queen of the Smugglers (contralto)	Fanny Wentworth
Chorus: Male and female smugglers, carabineers

Note: Fanny Wentworth was a member of the New York Standard English Opera.

The Lincoln Theatre cast also included (with no character designations given) Ms. Eva Mills, J. H. Rennie, Jno. O. Pugh, L. P. Slebold, and E. J. Whipple.

== Later performances ==
On February 20, 1885, in a Washington Composers Grand Concert, Sousa's quintet from The Smugglers was performed with vocal soloists along with several of his overtures played by the United States Marine Band.

== Musical numbers ==
1881 edition order.

Musical numbers
Act 1
Overture
Opening Chorus: Smugglers We
Scene: Silence, At Your Stations Hie!
Song: The widow's life's a lonely one
Scene and Solo: When the Storms of Life
Quintet: Ah, Love, Kind Love
Ballad: The Maiden Sat with Folded Hands
Duet: Come to These Arms that Long to Hold Thee!
Song: I've Leapt and I've Climbed Like a Blawsted Goat
Quintet and Chorus: It Matters Not
Trio and Chorus: He is a Spy
Finale: Rouse Thee, and Put Thine Armor On!
Act 2
Entre Act
Introduction and Duet: How Slowly Fades the Sun
Song: I'm a Robber Free and Bold
Trio: Do with your Flocks and Herds
Coronation Scene: We Hail Our New-Found King!
Duet: Canst Thou Turn Away
Song: Free Hearts of Spain
Song and Chorus: Wine! Wine!
Duet: Sighing, Ah, Sighing
Soldier's chorus: Let us march along
Scene and Chorus: Battle Song
Finale

== Music ==
Some of the music in The Smugglers is done in the style of Arthur Sulivan in order to pay homage to what inspired this operetta, The Contrabandista. This was highly unusual for Sousa, as he rarely copied other composer styles. Parts for the quintet in The Smugglers are in the Sousa Archives at the University of Illinois, and restored orchestrations are available at IMSLP.

Sousa later used the music of We Hail Our New-Found King from act 2 in his suite At the King's Court, and the melody to "Sighing, Ah, Sighing" was reused in his later operetta El Capitan for the duet "Sweetheart, I'm Waiting". Melodies from The Smugglers were later used to form The Lambs' March (1914).
