= Baroness Fiddlesticks =

1904 musical

The Baroness Fiddlesticks is a two-act 1904 Broadway musical with a book by George de Long. It was directed by Al M. Holbrook. The show's music was composed by Emil Bruguiere, with lyrics by de Long. The show opened on November 21, 1904, and ran for 25 performances at the Casino Theatre before closing on December 10, 1904.

The show took place in contemporary England and was billed as "a musical satire on society". Harry Lehr asked that his name be removed from one of the show's songs.

== Production ==
The show was mired in controversy, mostly surrounding eighteen-year-old Anna Fitzhugh being cast in the show's titular role. One financial backer objected to her casting, and she was removed from the show by the end of its first week on Broadway. However, the other cast members supported Fitzhugh, saying she had been "very badly used". Many of the cast members put in their two-week notice by November 25. At the same time, conductor Arthur Weld had resigned.

== Synopsis ==
London musical hall entertainer Patrina is invited to a house party at Mashaway's country estate. However, she decides to attend the event as the Baroness Fiddlesticks. Mashaway, who wants to make his name as a member of the stock exchange, comes at odds with Patrina's masquerade.

== Cast ==
Character	1904 Broadway
Patrina/Baroness Fiddlesticks	Anna Fitzhugh
Mashaway	John E. Henshaw
Maurel Trenchant	Tony Asher
Geraldine	Nella Bergen
Mrs. McGurk	Mary Ten Broeck
Isabelle	Toby Claude
Cholly	Walter A. Cluxton
Marionetta	Anna Johnston
Jenkins	Gustav Koldovski
Archer	Richie Ling
Jack Elkins	Alden McClaskie
Monty	Edna McClure
The Duchess of Reelboro	Minnie Methot
Algy	Mae Sherwood

== Songs ==
The order of songs is unknown, and they are thus presented alphabetically.

- "At a Fancy Costume Ball" (Isabelle)
- "Could You But Know"
- "Daphne Sue"
- "Heigh Ho"
- "I'm Just about as I Ought to Be" (Mashaway)
- "Imogen"
- "Listen to the Night a-Singing" (Geraldine)
- "Mr. Bugaboo" (Isabelle)
- "Rachel O'Toole"
- "Seeing New York" (Mashaway)
- "Something or Other Sue"
- "Spring" (Geraldine)
- "To Arms! Hear the Cry!" (Archer)
- "Tra-la-la-la"
- "What's the Use of Kisses"
- "When I Drop 'Round" (Patrina)
- "When You Don't Know"
- "When You Love a Little Girl"

== Reception ==
The New York Evening World praised Bruguiere's score as "worthwhile" saying that he "would undoubtedly have been able to get [the show] produced even if he had been broke". Brooklyn Life, the Galveston Daily News, and the Louisville Courier-Journal also praised the show's music. Both the Daily Times and Evening World papers were critical of the show's book.

The New York Times called the show "a decided hit" and praised its costuming.

Fitzhugh and the rest of the cast generally seemed to garner positive reviews.
