= Edna Wallace Hopper =

American actress

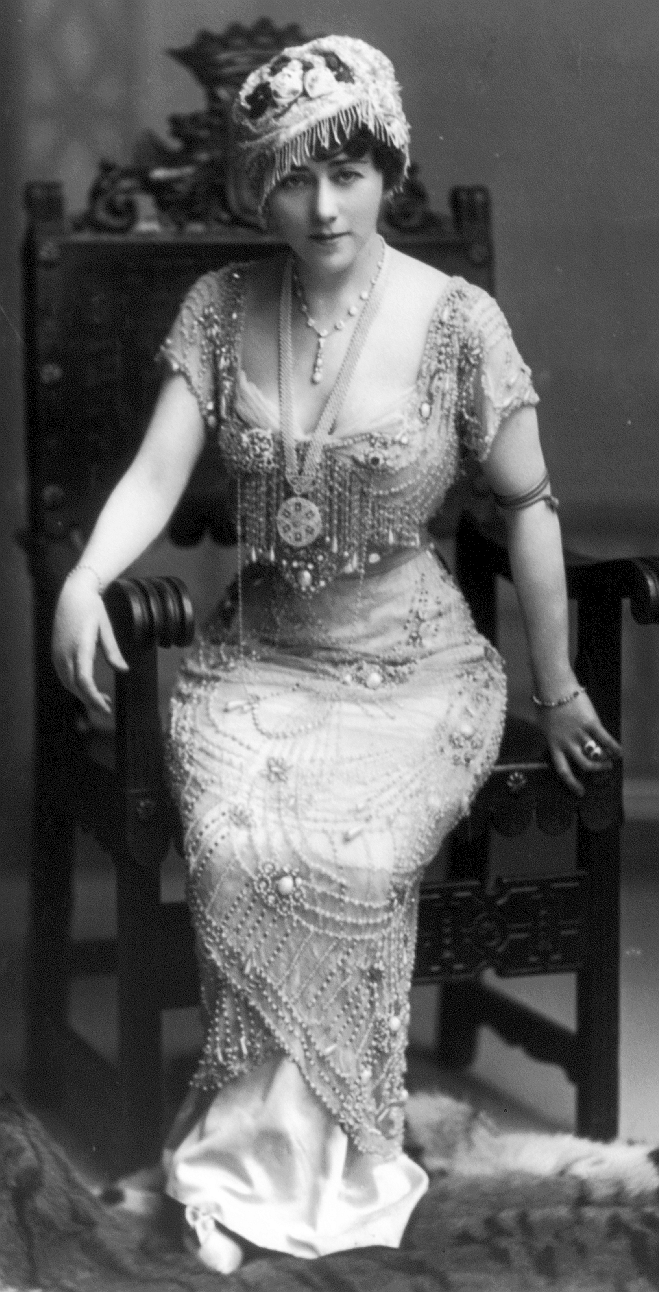
- Edna Wallace Hopper in 1910
- Born: Edna Margaret Augusta Wallace; January 17, 1872; San Francisco, California, US
- Died: December 14, 1959 (aged 87); New York City, US
- Occupation: Actress
- Spouse(s): DeWolf Hopper (1893–1898); Albert Oldfield Brown (1908)

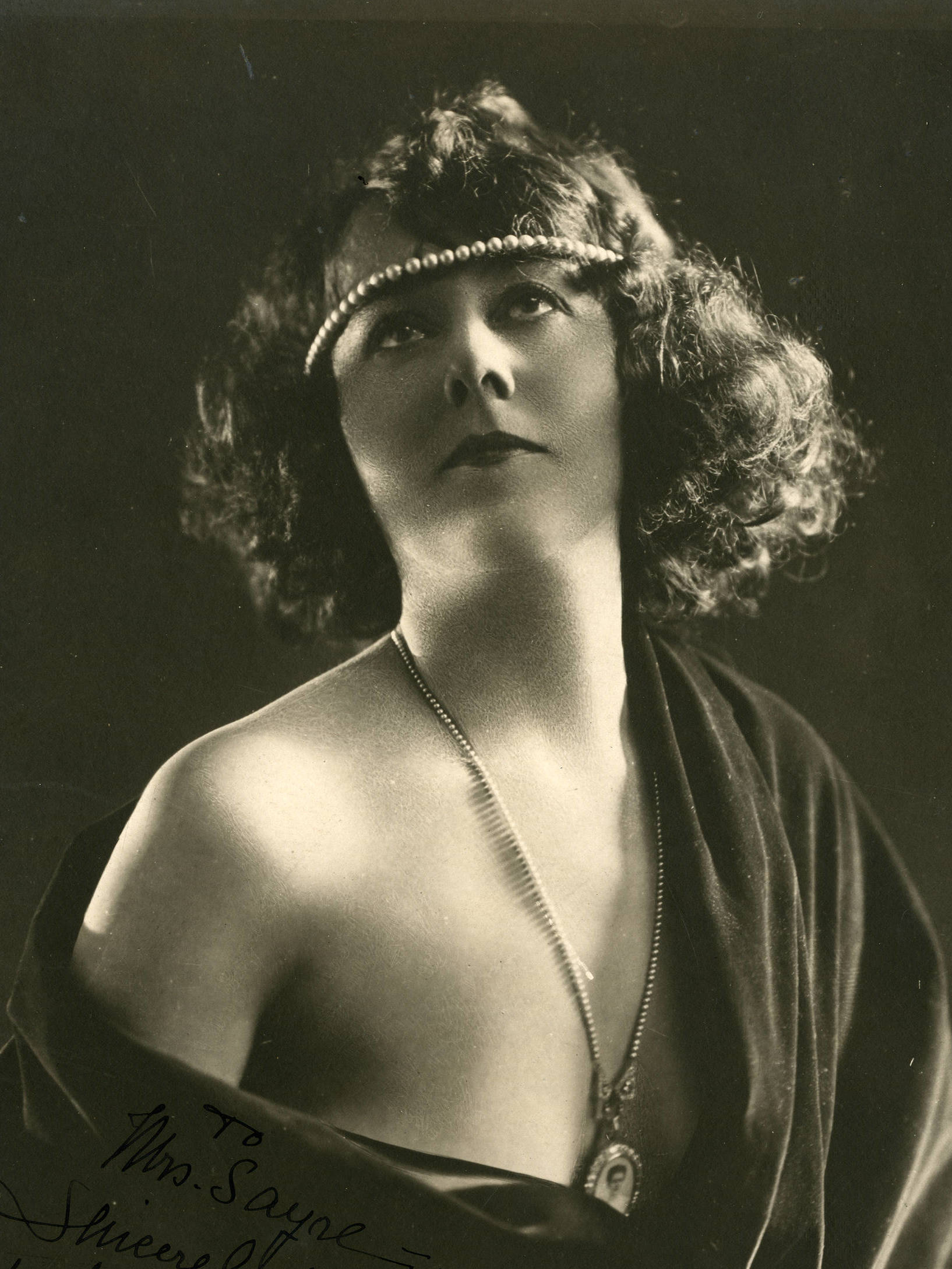
Edna Wallace Hopper in 1922

Edna Wallace Hopper (January 17, 1872 – December 14, 1959) was an American actress and singer. On the stage she achieved initial success as a soubrette in light operas. She later starred in Broadway musicals and transitioned into work in silent films. She was known as the "eternal flapper".

== Biography ==
Hopper was believed to have been born on January 17, 1872, as Edna Margaret Augusta Wallace in San Francisco, California, to Josephine and Waller Wallace. Hopper claimed her birth records were destroyed in the 1906 San Francisco earthquake. Her father was the head night usher at the California Theater. She had one sibling.

Hopper trained for the stage in New York. While there, she married DeWolf Hopper on June 28, 1893. They appeared in several comic operas together, including John Philip Sousa's El Capitan, before divorcing in 1898. The couple presented a striking physical contrast on stage. DeWolf stood 6 ft 5 or 6 in, while Hopper stood under five feet tall and weighed less than 100 pounds.

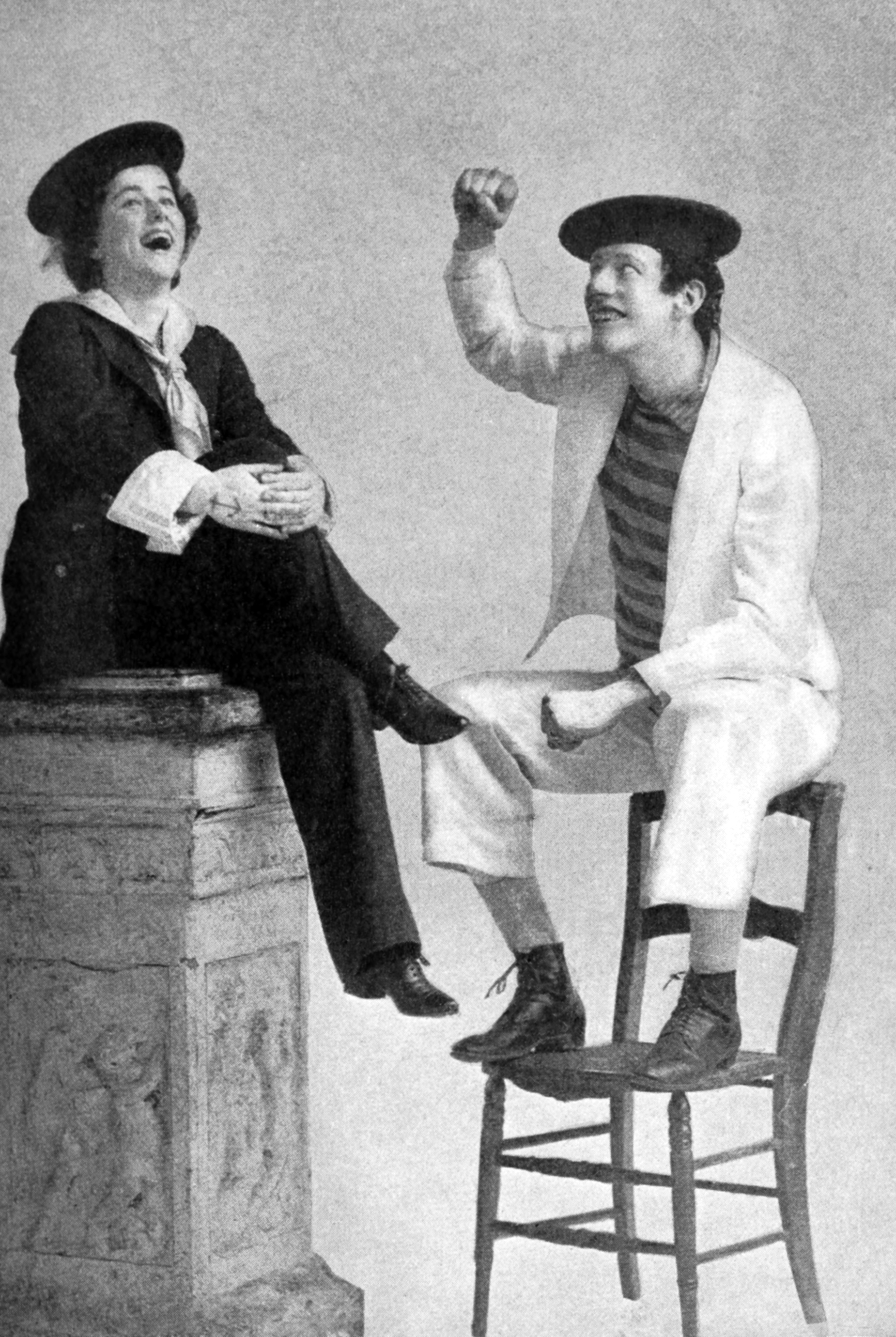
Edna Wallace and DeWolf Hopper in the musical Panjandrum (1893)

Hopper starred in Lady Holyrood in the popular musical Florodora, which had premiered in London.

Hopper remained active over the next decade, starring in George M. Cohan's Fifty Miles from Boston in 1907. She married Wall Street broker Albert Oldfield Brown in 1908. Her professional activity lessened in the 1910s but resumed in the 1920s. One of the earlier stage actors to have a facelift, Wallace Hopper had the operation filmed and then made personal appearance tours over the next eight years showing the film and revealing beauty tips. (Many decades later, veteran actress Jeanne Cooper would follow a similar path and have her own facelift procedure filmed and shown on the soap opera on which she had been appearing, The Young and the Restless.)

Hopper became associated with a line of personal care products and cosmetics, Edna Wallace Hopper Cosmetics, sold by American Home Products. In 1953, she performed the same role she had begun her acting career with in 1893, at the final performance at the Empire Theater in Manhattan, which was scheduled for demolition. The June 8, 1953, issue of Life Magazine featured an article on Hopper, considering her a popular stage actress and singer during the turn of the 20th century.

Hopper had separated from her second husband by 1923 and moved from New York to Los Angeles. She went on to become a stock trader and was the first and (during her tenure) the only woman on the thirty-six member board of L. F. Rothschild & Co.

== Death ==
Hopper died on December 14, 1959, in New York City. She was buried in Mountain View Cemetery in Oakland, California.
