= Wilson Vance =

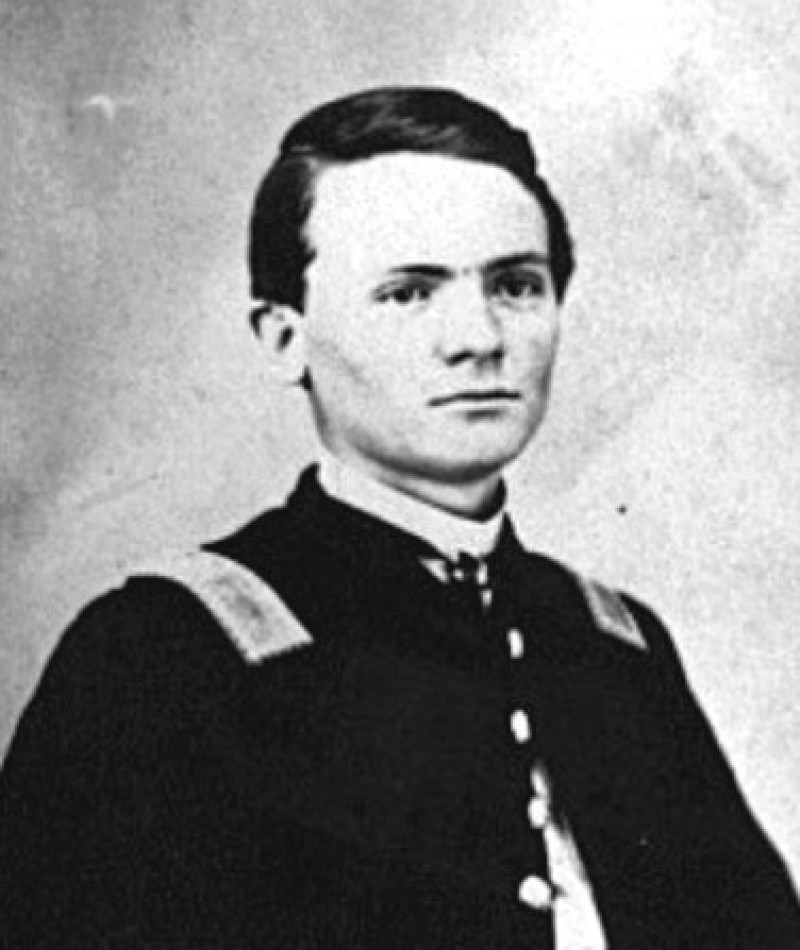
- Born: December 20, 1845; Findlay, Ohio, U.S.
- Died: November 10, 1911 (aged 65); Chattanooga, Tennessee, U.S.
- Burial place: Arlington National Cemetery, Arlington, Virginia
- Military career
- Allegiance: United States
- Branch: United States Army; Union Army
- Rank: Private
- Unit: 21st Ohio Infantry
- Conflicts: Battle of Stones River
- Awards: Medal of Honor

Wilson J. Vance (December 20, 1845, Findlay, Ohio – November 10, 1911, Chattanooga, Tennessee) was an American soldier who fought for the Union Army during the American Civil War, an author, a journalist and an editor. He received the Medal of Honor for valor.

== Civil War service ==
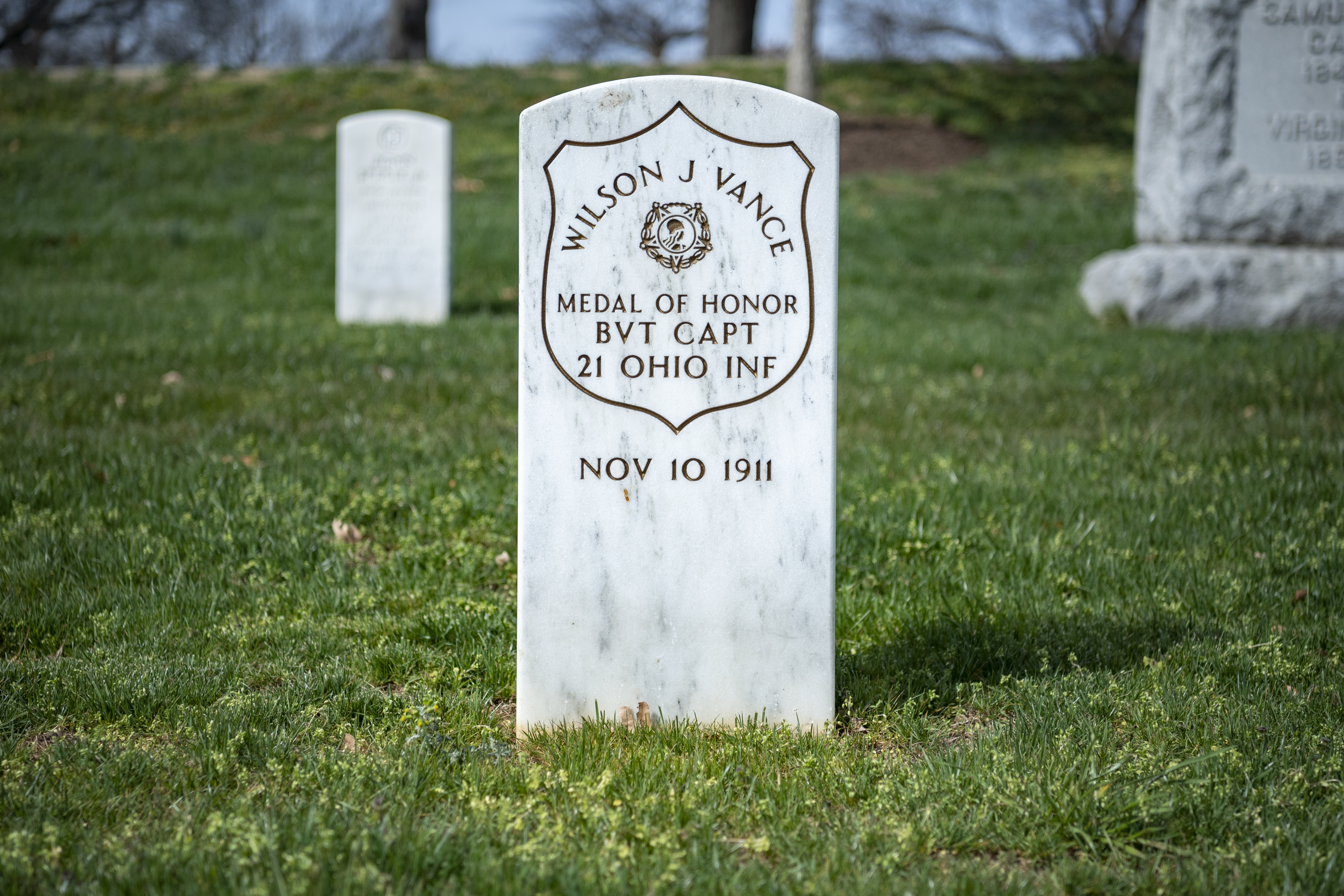
Grave at Arlington National Cemetery

Vance served in the American Civil War in the 21st Ohio Infantry as a private, enlisting in 1861. He received the Medal of Honor on September 17, 1897, for his actions on January 3, 1863, at the Battle of Stones River. He was commissioned as a second lieutenant, becoming the youngest commissioned officer in the Army of the Cumberland. He commanded a company at the Battle of Chickamauga while not yet 18 and remained in the army to the end of the war.

=== Medal of Honor citation ===
Rank and organization: Private, Company B, 21st Ohio Infantry. Place and date: At Murfreesboro, TN., 31 December 1862. Entered service at:------. Birth: Ohio. Date of Issue: 17 September 1897.

Citation:

Voluntarily and under a heavy fire, while his command was falling back, rescued a wounded and helpless comrade from death or capture.

== Post-war ==
Vance attended Harvard Law School and practiced for a year or two, but switched to journalism. He became the managing editor of the Ohio State Journal in 1870, the Indianapolis Journal in 1873, and The New York Advertiser for two years after moving to New York in 1892. He also served as Washington correspondent for various publications. In 1904, he became the editor of The Square Deal.

Vance wrote the librettos for two operettas scored by John Philip Sousa: Katherine (1879) (unproduced) and The Smugglers (1882) which premiered in Washington D.C.

He is the father of author Louis Joseph Vance.

He died of heart disease in Chattanooga, Tennessee, while attending a reunion of the Army of the Cumberland.

== See also ==
- List of American Civil War Medal of Honor recipients: T-Z
