= The Charlatan (operetta) =

1898 American operetta

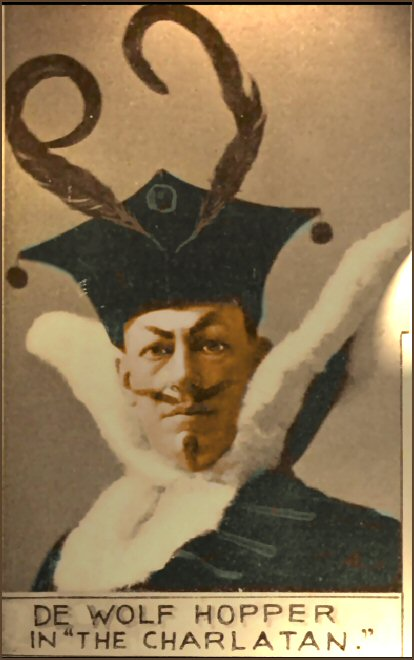
DeWolf Hopper in The Charlatan

The Charlatan is an 1898 American operetta also known as The Mystical Miss, with music and lyrics by John Philip Sousa. Today only excerpts from the work—"The Charlatan March", "The Charlatan Waltzes" and "The Charlatan Overture"—are commonly known. The operetta is set in the early nineteenth century in Russia with scenes in the village of Bohkara; at Gogol's house; and in the Grand Duke's Palace in Russia.

== Production ==
The Charlatan is a comic opera in three acts, with a book by Charles Klein and music by John Philip Sousa. It was written for the DeWolf Hopper Opera Company, which presented the work for the first time on August 29, 1898. Directed by H. A. Cripps, the Broadway production ran September 8 – October 8, 1898, at the Knickerbocker Theatre in New York City.

=== Cast ===
- DeWolf Hopper as Demidoff
- Edmund Stanley as Prince Boris
- Mark M. Price as Gogol
- Alfred Klein as Jelikoff
- George W. Barnum as Captain Peshofki
- Arthur Cunningham as the Grand Duke
- Harry P. Stone as Kofeff
- C. Arthur as Skobeloff
- Nella Bergen as Anna
- Alice Judson as Katrinka
- Katherine Carlisle as Sophia
- Adine Bouviere as the Grand Duchess

After a profitable tour, The Charlatan was reprised on Broadway beginning May 4, 1899, at the Fifth Avenue Theatre. Hopper and his wife Nella Bergen starred in the operetta—titled The Mystical Miss—at the Comedy Theatre in London beginning December 13, 1899.
