= DeWolf Hopper =

American actor, singer, comedian, and theatrical producer (1858–1935)

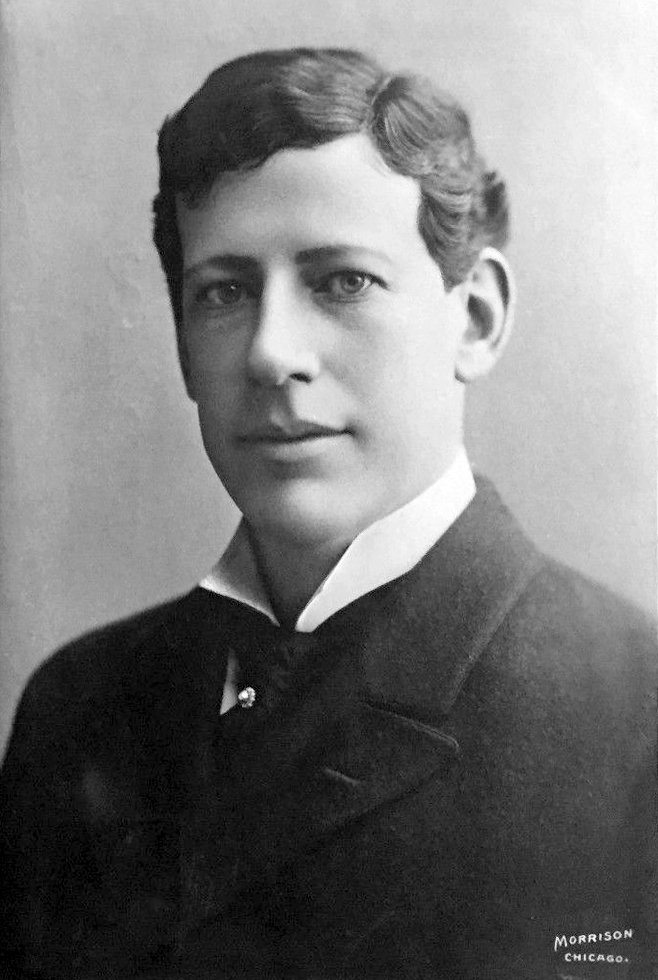

Shepherd of The Lambs
- In office 1900–1902
- Preceded by: Thomas B. Clarke
- Succeeded by: Wilton Lackaye

Personal details
- Born: William D'Wolf Hopper; March 30, 1858 New York City, U.S.
- Died: September 23, 1935 (aged 77) Kansas City, Missouri, U.S.
- Resting place: Green-Wood Cemetery, Brooklyn, N.Y.
- Spouses: Helen Gardiner (m. 1880; div. 1885) Ida Mosher (m. 1886; div. 1892) Edna Wallace (m. 1893; div. 1898) Nella Bergen (m. 1899; div. 1913) Hedda Hopper (m. 1913; div. 1922) Lillian Glaser (m. 1925)
- Children: 2; including William Hopper
- Occupation: Actor; singer; comedian; theatrical producer

William DeWolf Hopper (March 30, 1858 – September 23, 1935) was an American actor, singer, comedian, and theatrical producer. A star of vaudeville and musical theater, he became best known for performing the popular baseball poem "Casey at the Bat".

== Life and career ==
Hopper was born William D'Wolf Hopper in New York City, the son of John Hopper (1815–1864) and Rosalie D'Wolf (1826–1910). His father was a wealthy Quaker lawyer and his mother came from a noted Colonial family. His paternal grandfather Isaac Hopper was a Philadelphia Quaker, and conductor of the Philadelphia station of the Underground Railroad. Though his parents intended that he become a lawyer, Hopper did not enjoy that profession. Hopper was called Willie as a child, and then Will or Wolfie, but when he set out on an acting career he chose his more distinguished middle name as his stage name. It was modified to "DeWolf" because of the frequency that it was mispronounced "Dwolf".

He made his stage debut in New Haven, Connecticut, October 2, 1878. Originally, he wanted to be a serious actor, but at 6 ft 5 in (196 cm) and 230 pounds, he was too large for most dramatic roles. He had a loud bass singing voice, however, and made his mark in musicals, beginning in Harrigan and Hart's company. He achieved the status of leading man in The Black Hussar (1885) and appeared in the hit Erminie in 1887. Eventually, he starred in more than thirty Broadway musicals, including Castles in the Air (1890), Wang (1891), Panjandrum (1893), John Philip Sousa's El Capitan (1896), and Reginald De Koven's Happyland. The role that he remembered with greatest pleasure was Old Bill in The Better 'Ole (1919).

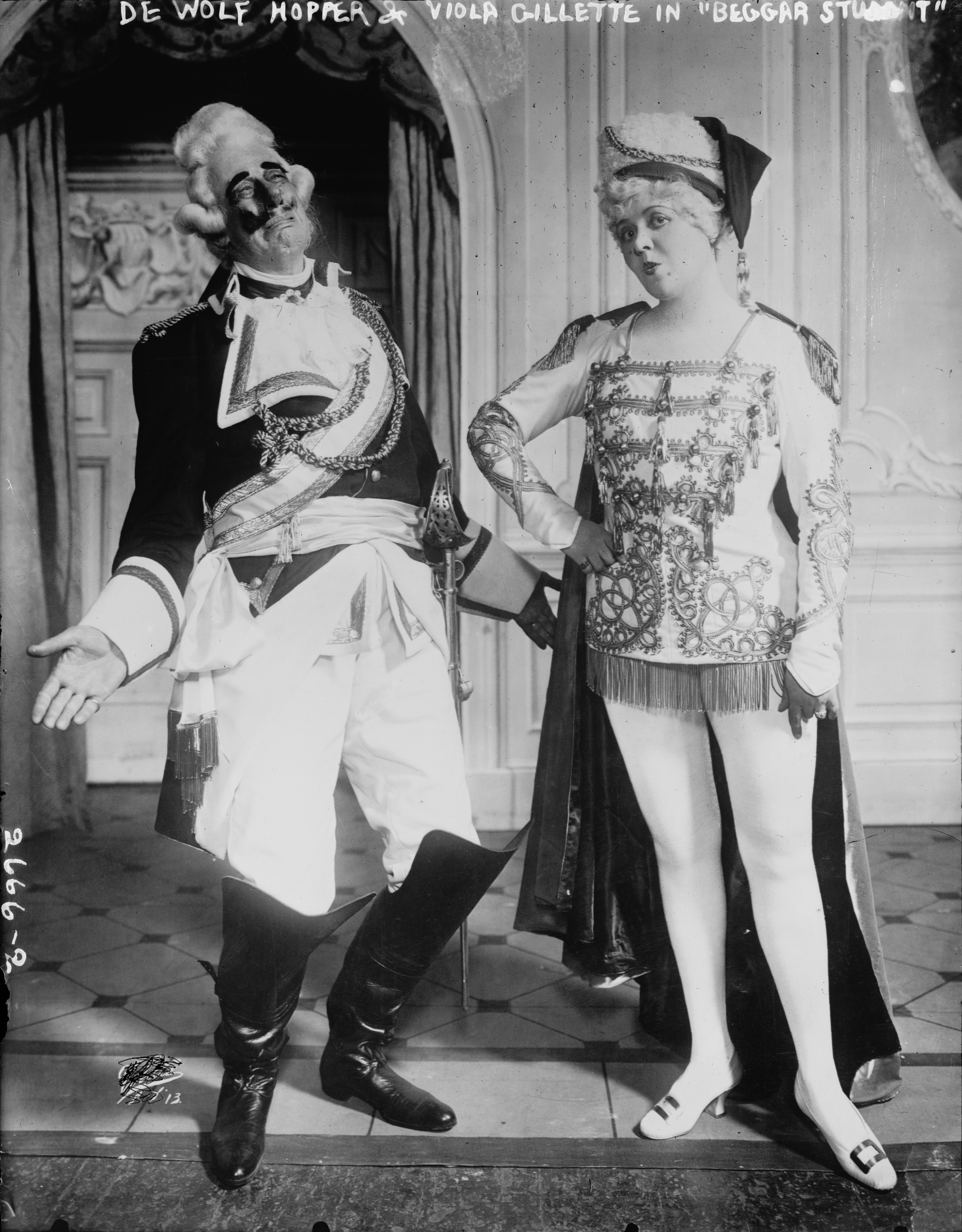
Hopper and Viola Gillette in Beggar Student (1913)

Known for his comic talents, Hopper popularized many comic songs and appeared in a number of Gilbert and Sullivan comic "patter" roles from 1911 to 1915, including The Mikado, Patience, and H.M.S. Pinafore.

A lifelong baseball enthusiast and New York Giants fan, he first performed Ernest Thayer's then-unknown poem "Casey at the Bat" to the Giants and Chicago Cubs the day his friend, Baseball Hall of Fame pitcher Tim Keefe had his record 19-game winning streak stopped, August 14, 1888. Hopper helped make the comic poem famous and was often called upon to give his colorful, melodramatic recitation, which he did about 10,000 times in his booming voice, reciting it during performances and as part of curtain calls, and on radio. He released a recorded version on phonograph record in 1906, and recited the poem in a short film made in the Phonofilm sound-on-film process in 1923.

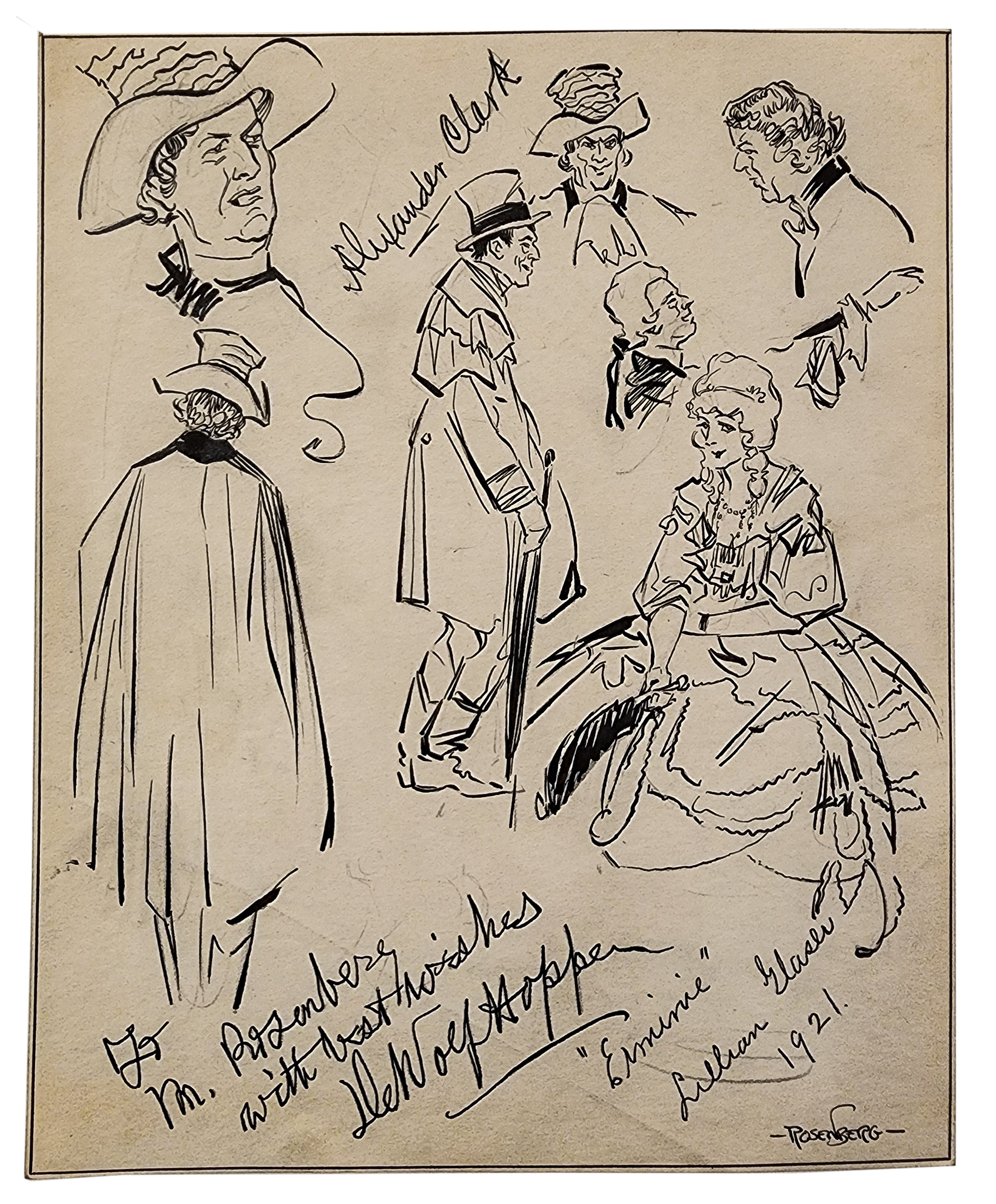
DeWolf Hopper autographed sketch by Manuel Rosenberg for the Cincinnati Post, 1921

It was in The Black Hussar that Hopper first incorporated a baseball theme that drew notice in the sporting press. To accompany a song with a baseball stanza, "Mr. Hopper enacts the pitcher, Mr. [Digby] Bell, with a bird cage on his head and boxing gloves on his hands, plays catcher, while Mme. [Mathilde] Cottrelly handles a diminutive bat as striker and endeavors to make a 'home run.'"

In 1889, Hopper became founding president of the Actors' Amateur Athletic Association of America. Back in 1886, besides organizing a regular ball team among actors, he played in a benefit game for a demented playwright. The following year, he helped organize an actor's benefit for a sick young actress. In the first inning, someone presented him with an eight-inch sunflower.

Also in 1889, Bell, Hopper and fellow McCaull Comic Opera Company actor Jefferson De Angelis were doing the following skit for their third encore in Boccaccio. Bell returns "with a bat in his hand, followed by DeWolf Hopper and De Angelis. The latter has a ball, and as Hopper takes the bat in hand and Bell acts as catcher the former goes through the customary contortion act in pitching, and as Hopper hits the ball he runs off the stage, as if running the bases, and presently returns chased by De Angelis, who passes the ball to Bell as catcher just as Hopper makes a big slide for home base. The slider tumbles Bell, and when he rises from the somersault all three yell out to the audience for judgment [a ruling], and go off kicking like Anson and [New York captain Buck] Ewing. It is a rich gag and takes immediately", the Brooklyn Eagle said.

That year, Bell called Hopper "the biggest baseball crank that ever lived. Physically, of course, he is a corker, but when I say big I mean big morally and intellectually. Why, he goes up to the baseball [Polo] grounds at One Hundred and Fifty-fifth street after the matinees on Saturday, and he travels this six miles simply to see, perhaps, the two final innings, and any one can imagine the rapidity with which he must scrape off the makeup and get into his street clothes in order to secure even this much. But he says the Garrison finishes are worth it, and he is perfectly right. Hopper always was a baseball crank, long before the public knew anything about it."

Bald from childhood (he had alopecia), Hopper wore wigs both on and offstage. In later years, a reaction to harsh medicines that he took for throat problems gave his skin a bluish tinge. Regardless, his powerful voice and great sense of humor seemed an attraction to women all his life. With an insatiable appetite for young actresses, he left a long trail of six wives and countless mistresses in his wake, he became known by the nickname "The Husband of His Country."

Hopper also appeared in several silent motion pictures, two examples being Don Quixote (1915) and Casey at the Bat (1916). Hopper also appeared in a few short sound films, including one in 1923 when he actually recites Casey at the Bat in an experimental sound film produced by Lee De Forest's Phonofilm process.Hopper was a part of the Triangle Film Corporation, which he described as “the first great flourish” of a “prattling, infant industry”.

He made a Broadway appearance in White Lilacs (1928). He then did Radio City Music Hall Inaugural (1932), and played Dr. Gustave Ziska in The Monster (1933). At the time of his death, he was in Kansas City, Missouri, making a radio appearance. His funeral was at the Little Church Around the Corner, in New York City

His autobiography, Once a Clown, Always a Clown, written with the assistance of Wesley W. Stout, was published in 1927.

== Marriages ==
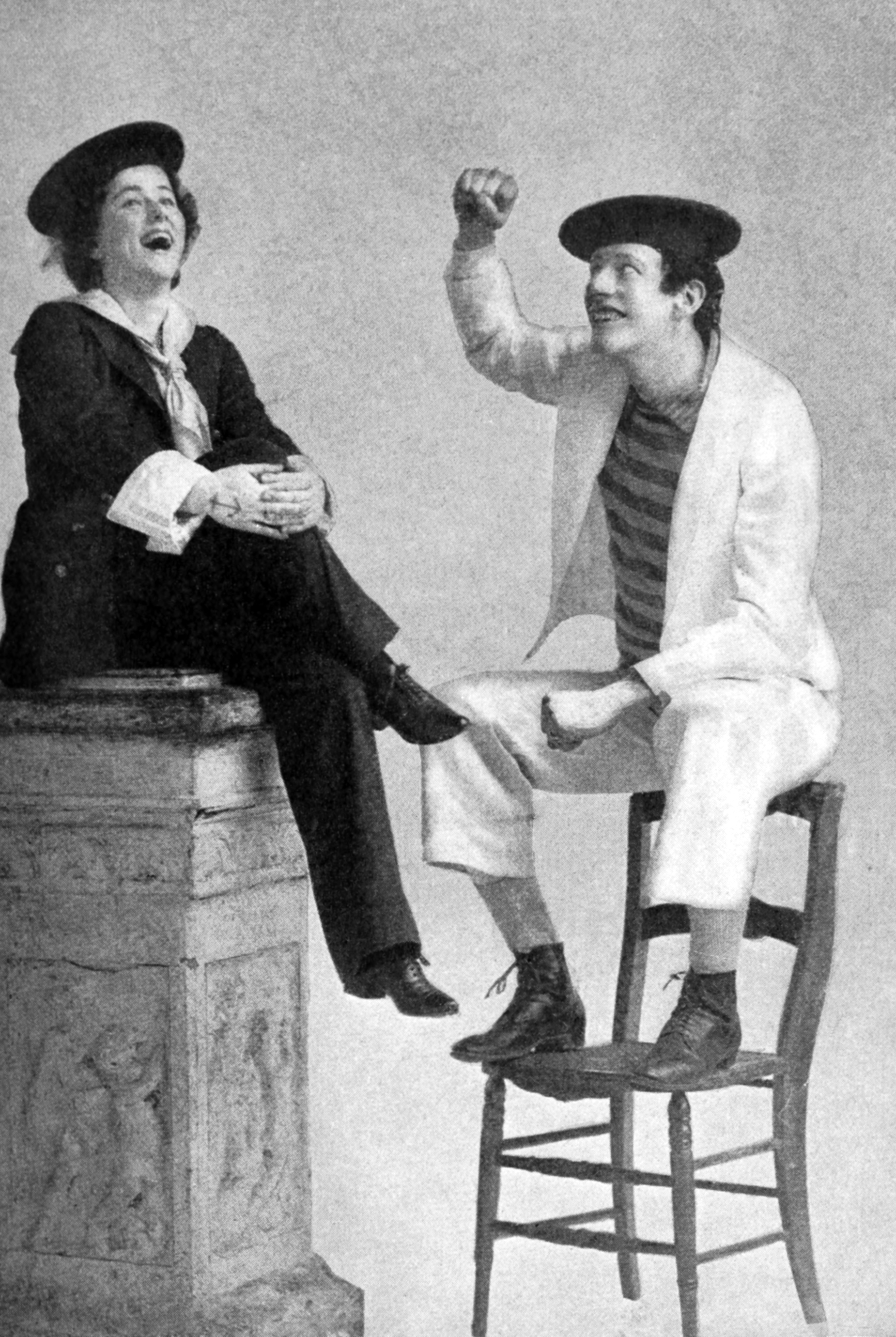
Edna Wallace and Hopper in the musical Panjandrum (1893)

Five of Hopper's marriages ended in divorce. His last marriage ended in his death.

- At age 21, Hopper was married to his first wife, actress Helen Gardiner, his second cousin.
- His second wife was Ida Mosher. They had one son in 1886, John Allan Hopper, and divorced in 1893.
- 1893–1898: His third wife was Edna Wallace.
- 1899–1913: His fourth wife was choir singer Nella Bergen (née Reardon), whom he married in London. She was divorced from actor James Bergen.
- 1913–1922: His fifth wife was actress and gossip columnist Hedda Hopper; they had one son, actor William Hopper.
- 1925–1935: His sixth wife was vocal instructor Lillian E. "Lulu" Glaser (née Faulkes), a widow.

== Theatre credits ==
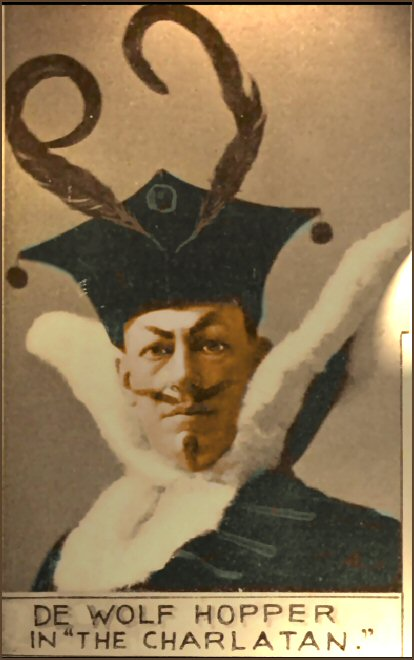
Hopper in The Charlatan (1898)

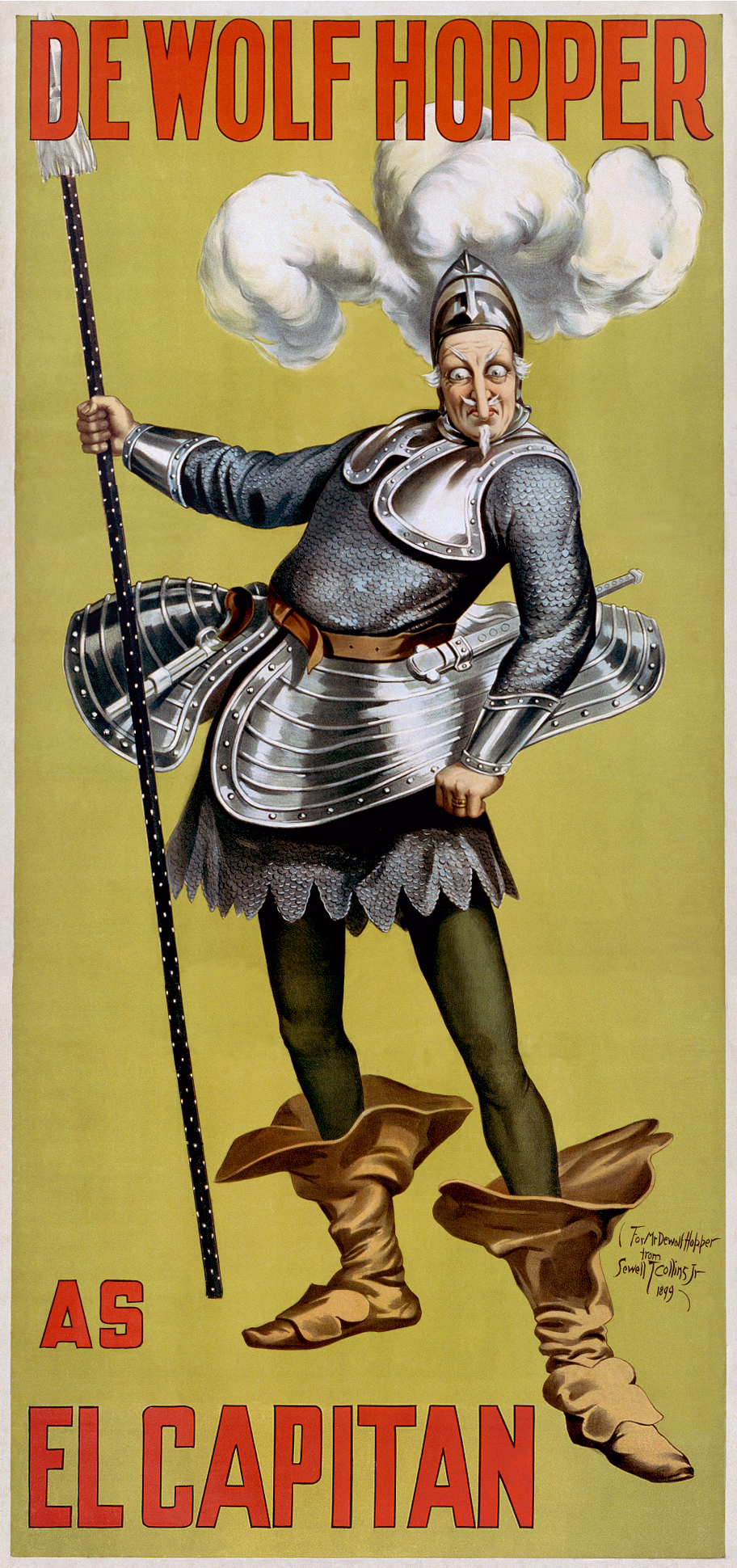
Poster for Hopper in John Philip Sousa's El Capitan (1896)

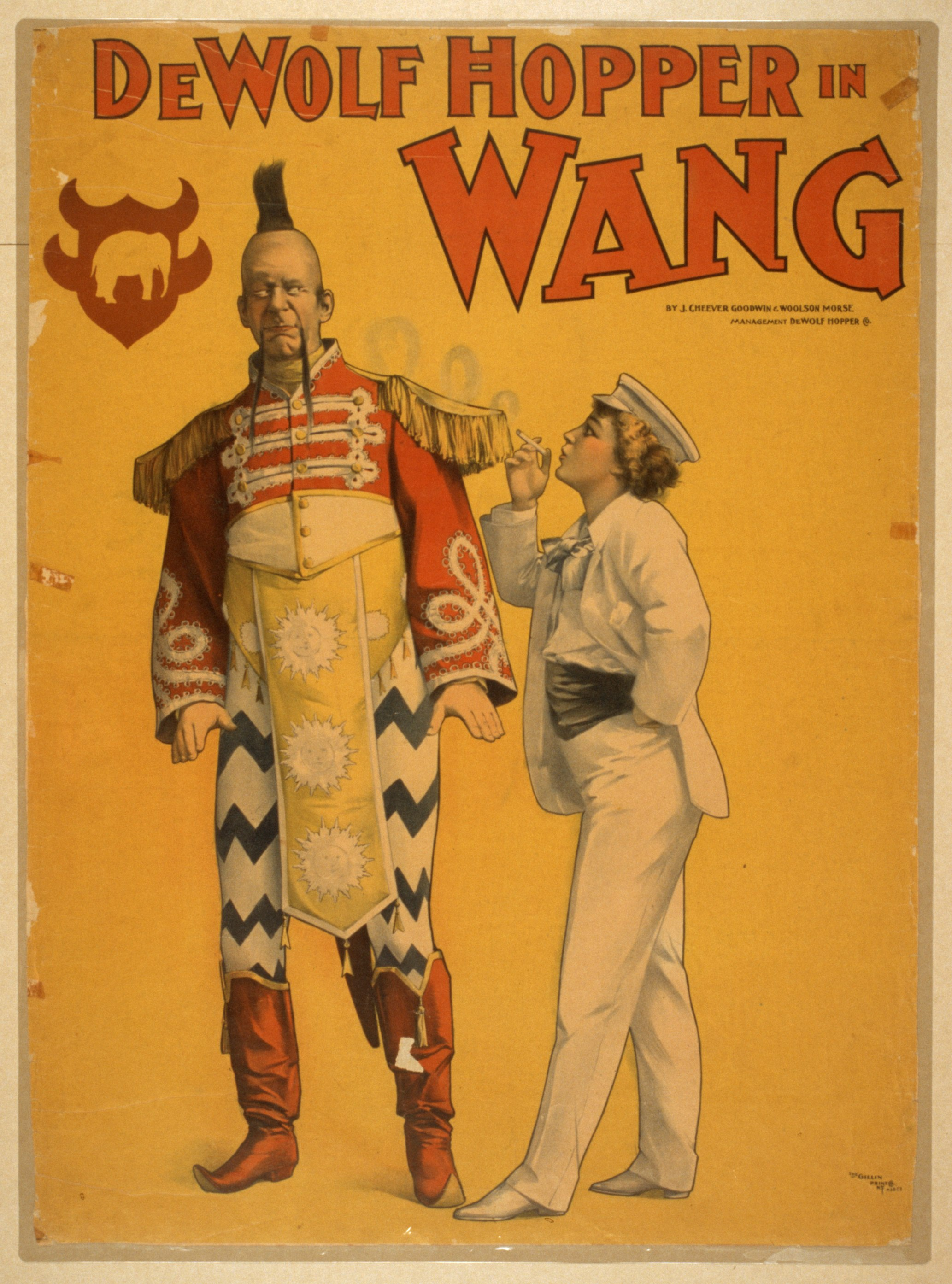
Poster for Hopper in Wang (1897)

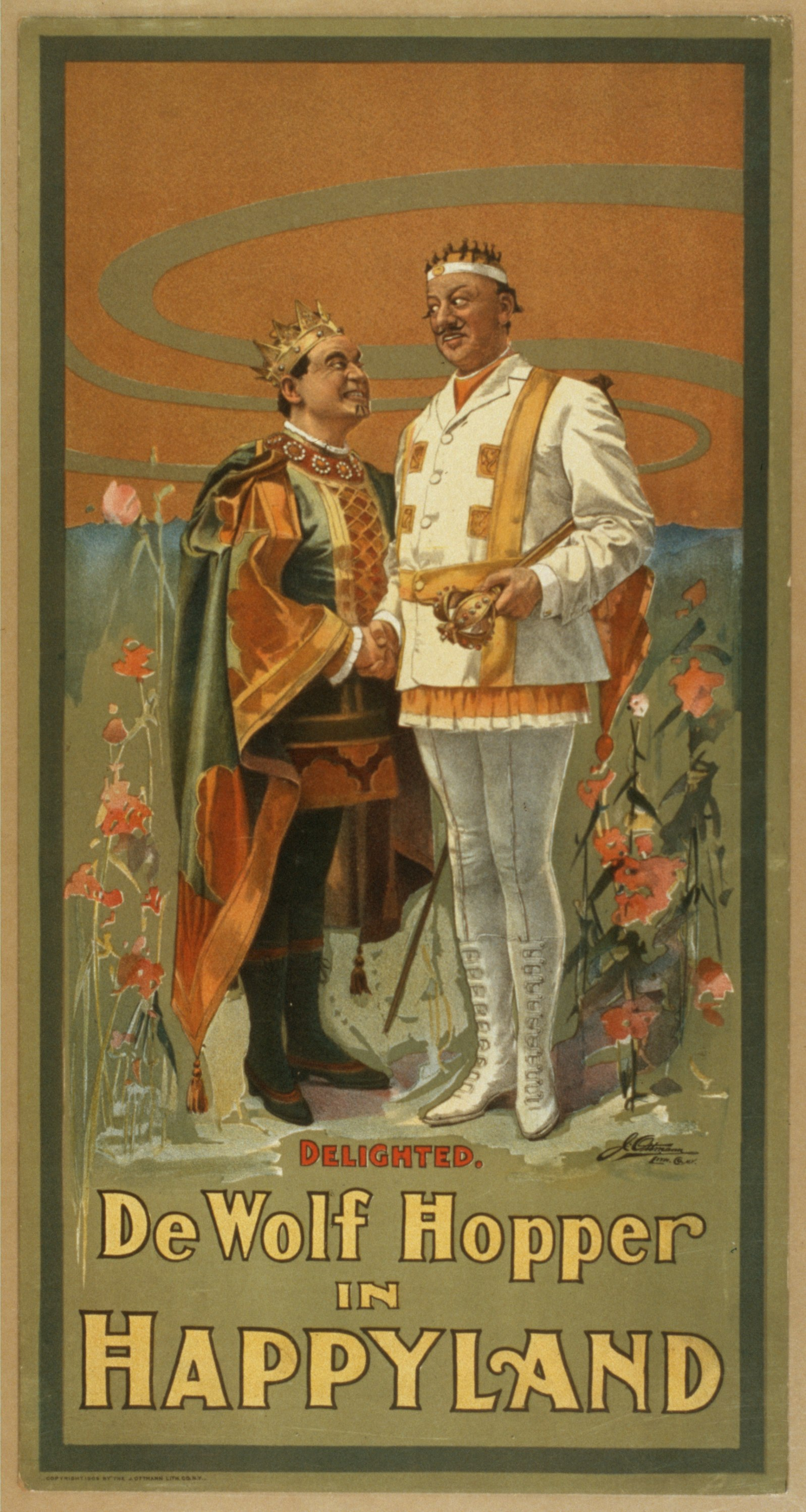
Poster for Hopper in Happyland (1905)

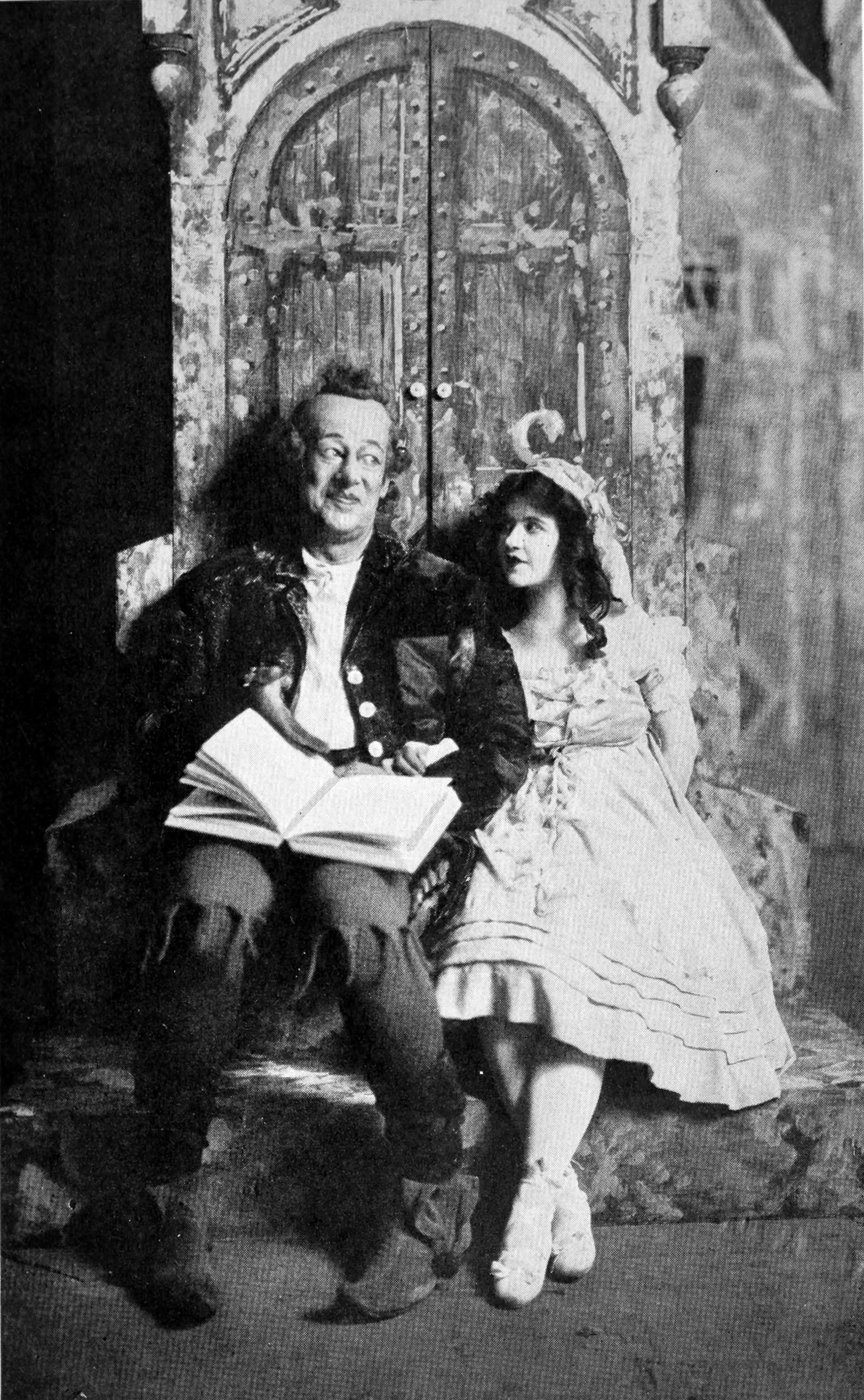
Hopper and Marguerite Clark in The Pied Piper (1908)

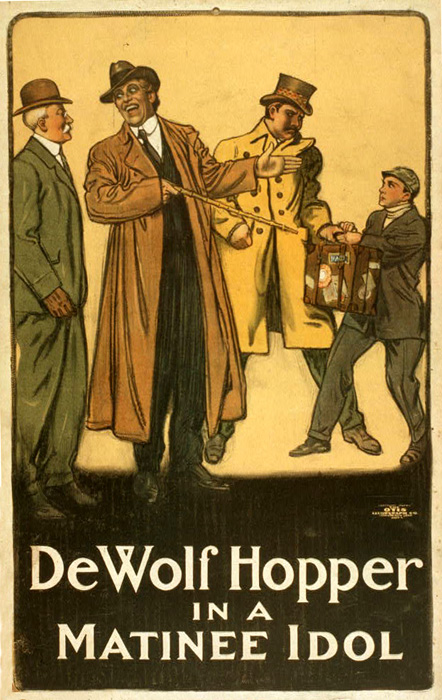
Poster for Hopper in A Matinee Idol (1910)

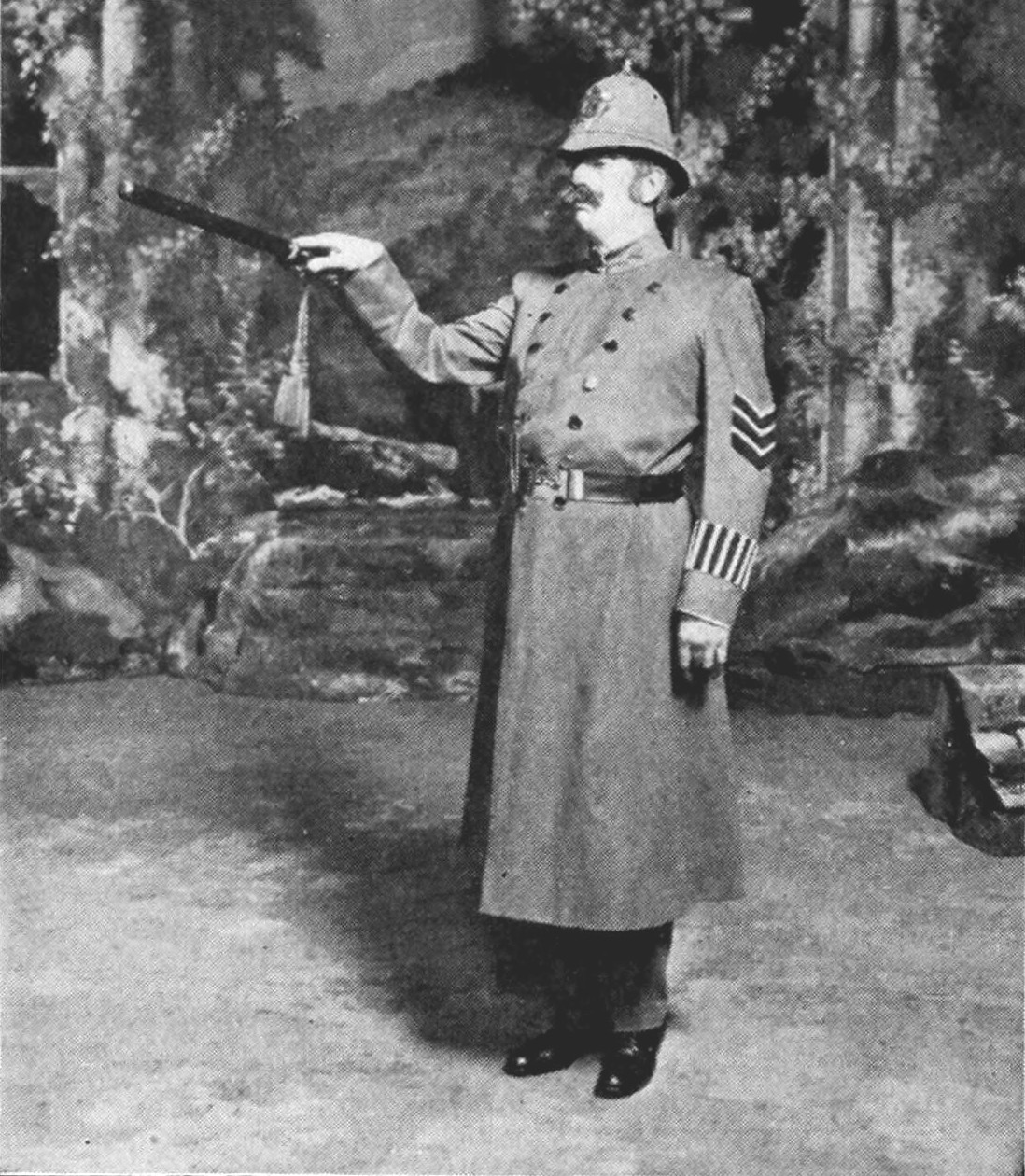
Hopper as the Sergeant of Police in The Pirates of Penzance (1912)

=== DeWolf Hopper Opera Company productions ===
The Charlatan [Original, Musical, Comedy, Opera]
December 5, 1889 – June 17, 1899
Mr. Pickwick [Original, Musical]
January 19, 1903 – May 1903

=== Stage roles ===
Lorraine [Original, Musical, Comedy, Opera]
February 28, 1887 – March 12, 1887, Gaspard de Chateauvieux
The Begum [Original, Musical, Comedy, Opera]
September 21, 1887 – December 10, 1887, Howja-Dhu
Casey at the Bat [Original, Special, Poem, Solo]
August 14, 1888 – August 14, 1888, Himself
The Charlatan [Original, Musical, Comedy, Opera]
December 5, 1889 – June 17, 1899, Demidoff
Wang [Original, Musical, Comedy, Operetta]
May 4, 1891 – October 3, 1891, Wang
Fiddle-dee-dee [Original, Musical, Burlesque, Extravaganza]
September 6, 1900 – April 20, 1901

Fiddle-dee-dee, Hoffman Barr
Quo Vass Iss?, Petrolius
Arizona, Henry Cannedbeef
Exhibit II, The Gay Lord Quex

Hoity Toity [Original, Musical, Burlesque]
September 5, 1901 – April 19, 1902

Hoity Toity, General Steele
Depleurisy, Countess Zicka
A Man From Mars, An A.D.T. Man from Mars
The Curl and the Judge, Judge Charges
DuHurry

Mr. Pickwick [Original, Musical]
January 19, 1903 – May 1903, Pickwick
Wang [Revival, Musical, Comedy, Operetta]
April 18, 1904 – June 4, 1904, Wang
Happyland [Original, Musical, Comedy, Opera]
October 2, 1905 – June 2, 1906, Ecstaticus
The Pied Piper [Original, Musical, Comedy]
December 3, 1908 – January 16, 1909, The Pied Piper
A Matinee Idol [Original, Musical, Comedy]
April 28, 1910 – May 1911, Medford Griffin
H.M.S. Pinafore [Revival, Musical, Operetta]
May 29, 1911 – July 8, 1911, Performer
Patience [Revival, Musical, Operetta]
May 6, 1912 – June 1, 1912, Reginald Bunthorne
The Pirates of Penzance [Revival, Musical, Operetta]
June 3, 1912 – June 26, 1912, Edward
H.M.S. Pinafore [Revival, Musical, Operetta]
June 27, 1912 – June 28, 1912, Dick Deadeye
The Mikado [Revival, Musical, Operetta]
June 29, 1912 – June 29, 1912, Ko-Ko
The Beggar Student [Revival, Musical, Comedy, Opera]
March 22, 1913, General Ollendorf
The Mikado [Revival, Musical, Operetta]
April 21, 1913 – May 3, 1913, Ko-Ko
H.M.S. Pinafore [Revival, Musical, Operetta]
May 5, 1913 – May 10, 1913, Dick Deadeye
Iolanthe [Revival, Musical, Comedy, Operetta]
May 12, 1913 – June 14, 1913, The Lord Chancellor
Lieber Augustin [Original, Musical, Operetta]
September 3, 1913 – October 4, 1913, Bogumil
Hop o' My Thumb [Original, Play, Pantomime]
November 26, 1913 – January 3, 1914, King Mnemonica
H.M.S. Pinafore [Revival, Musical, Operetta]
April 19, 1915 – June 19, 1915, Dick Deadeye
Trial by Jury [Revival, Musical, Operetta]
April 19, 1915 – June 19, 1915, The Learned Judge
The Yeomen of the Guard [Revival, Musical, Operetta]
April 19, 1915 – May 8, 1915, Jack Point
The Mikado [Revival, Musical, Operetta]
May 10, 1915 – June 19, 1915, Ko-Ko
The Sorcerer [Revival, Musical, Comedy, Operetta]
May 24, 1915 – June 5, 1915, John Wellington Wells
The Pirates of Penzance [Revival, Musical, Operetta]
June 7, 1915 – June 18, 1915, Major General Stanley
Iolanthe [Revival, Musical, Comedy, Operetta]
June 10, 1915 – June 17, 1915, The Lord Chancellor
The Passing Show of 1917 [Original, Musical, Revue]
April 26, 1917 – October 13, 1917, Performer
Everything [Original, Musical, Revue, Spectacle]
August 22, 1918 – May 17, 1919, Performer
Erminie [Revival, Musical, Comedy, Opera]
January 3, 1921 – February 26, 1921, Ravennes
Snapshots of 1921 [Original, Musical, Revue]
June 2, 1921 – August 6, 1921, Performer
Some Party [Original, Musical, Revue]
April 15, 1922 – April 29, 1922, Producer and Performer
White Lilacs [Original, Musical, Operetta, Romance]
September 10, 1928 – January 12, 1929, Dubusson
Radio City Music Hall Inaugural Program [Original, Special]
December 27, 1932 – December 27, 1932, Himself
The Monster [Revival, Play, Drama]
February 10, 1933 – Mar 1933, Dr. Gustave Ziska

== Filmography ==
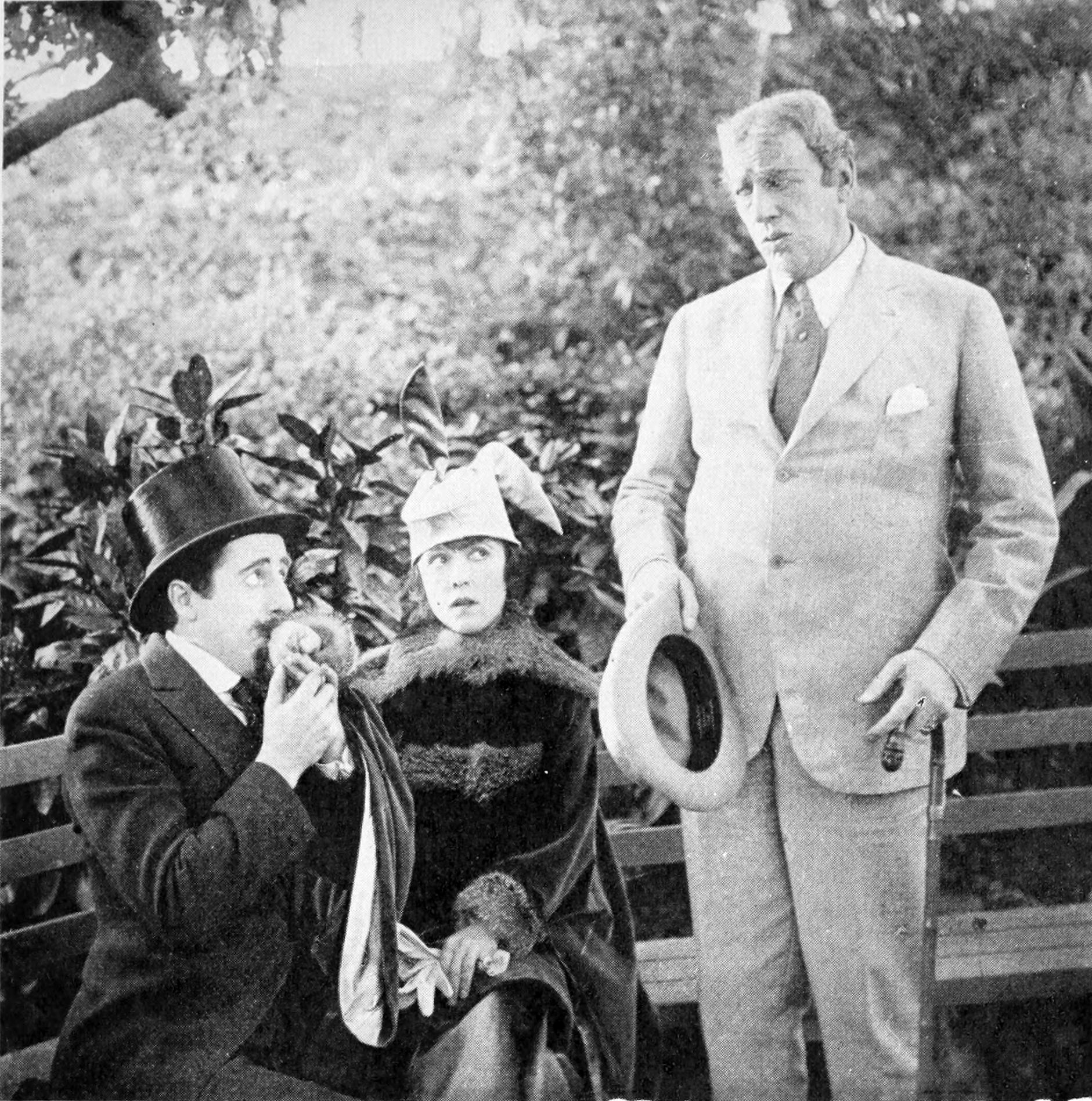
Sunshine Dad (1916)

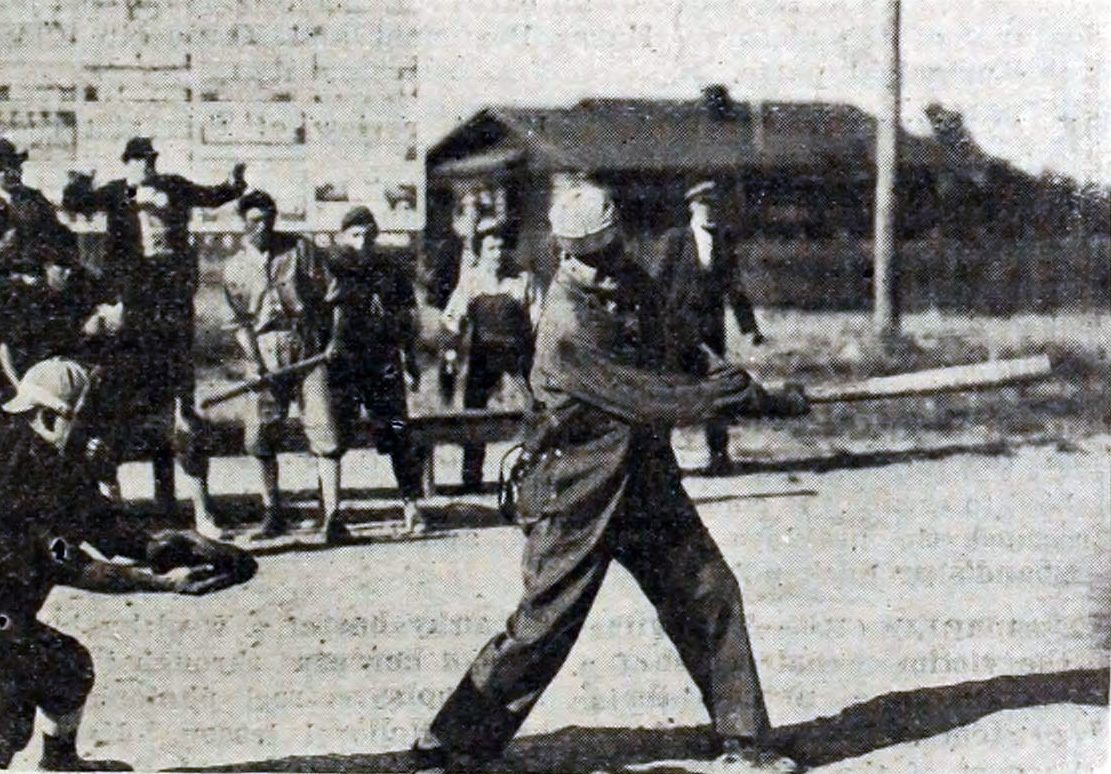
Casey at the Bat (1916)

Year	Title	Role	Notes
1915	Don Quixote	Alonso Quijano/Don Quixote	
1916	Rough Knight		
1916	Mr. Goode, the Samaritan	Alphonse Irving Goode	
1916	Sunshine Dad	Alonzo Evergreen	(extant; Library of Congress)
1916	Casey at the Bat	Casey	
1916	Stranded	H. Ulysses Watts	
1916	Intolerance: Love's Struggle Throughout the Ages	Extra	(extant)
1916	Puppets	Pantaloon	
1922	Casey at the Bat	Himself	Reading the poem in experimental film made in Phonofilm sound-on-film process; premiered April 15, 1923, at the Rivoli Theater in NYC
1930	C		(extant; Library of Congress)
1930	The March of Time	Himself	Old Timer Sequence in unfinished MGM movie
1932	Ladies Not Allowed		
