= Josephine Hall =

American actress (1865–1922)

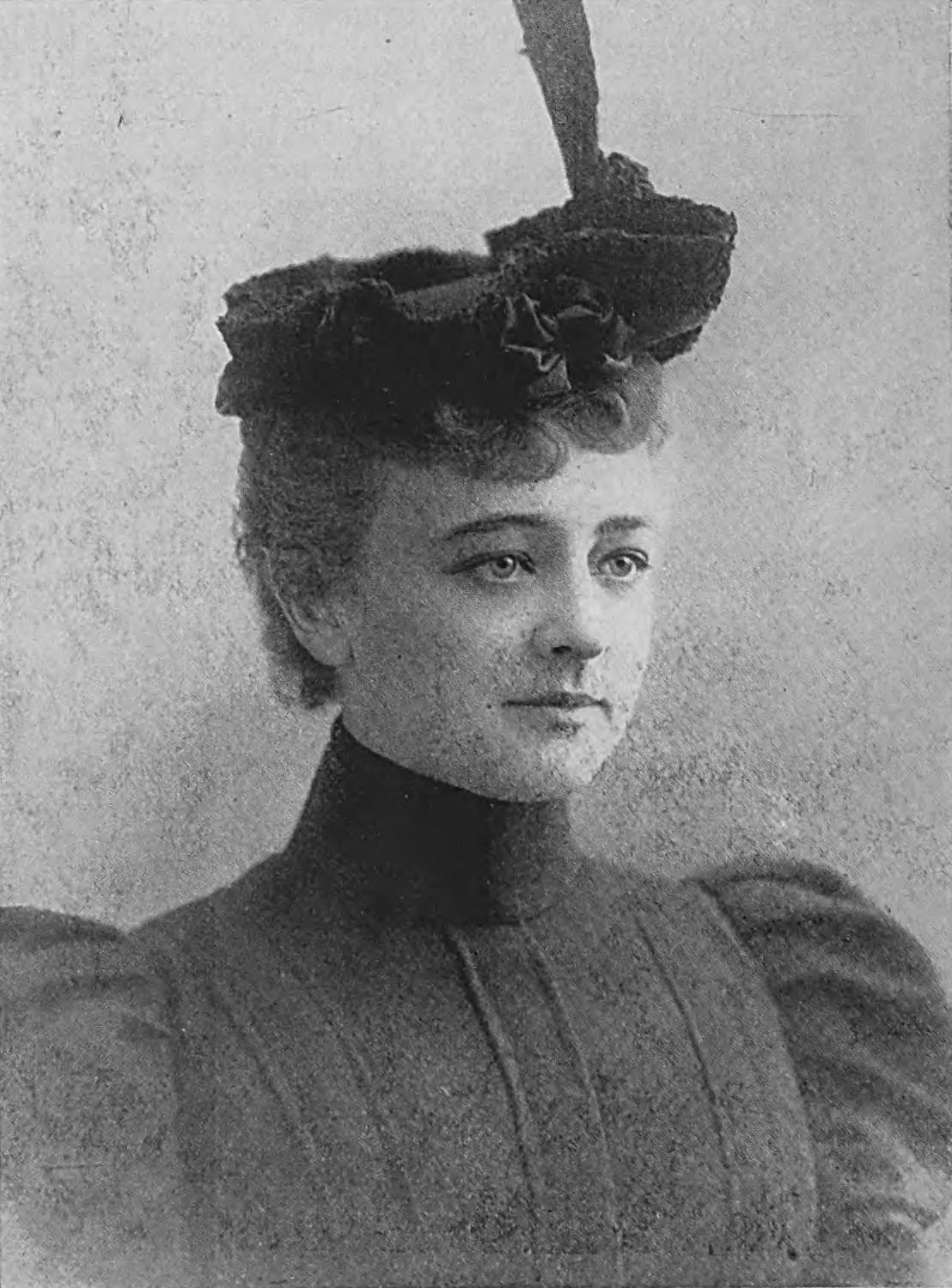
- Hall c. 1888
- Born: April 19, 1865; East Greenwich, Rhode Island, U.S.
- Died: December 5, 1920 (aged 55); Apponaug, Rhode Island, U.S.
- Other names: Josie Hall; Annie Josephine Hall
- Occupations: Stage actress, soprano
- Spouse: Alfred E. Aarons (m. 1899; div. 1911)
- Children: 1

Annie Josephine Hall (April 19, 1865 – December 5, 1920) was an American actress and soprano. She began her career performing in musicals and operettas produced by Edward E. Rice from 1883 to 1886, including the 1885 Broadway productions of Polly, or The Pet of the Regiment, and Billee Taylor at the Casino Theatre. She remained active on the stage in both plays and musicals into the early 1900s, often in works produced or created by Charles Frohman, with whom she was under contract for many years. According to her 1920 obituary in The New York Times, she was most famous for her performances of the song "Sister Mary Jane's Top Note" and for her appearances in the Broadway productions of The Girl from Paris (1896) and The Girl from Maxim's (1899).

Hall retired from performance in 1904. She briefly came out of retirement in 1910 to perform in Klaw & Erlanger's production of The Air King. She was the mother of Broadway producer Alexander A. Aarons, who had a longterm collaboration with Vinton Freedley. His father was the Broadway composer and producer Alfred E. Aarons. Hall married Alfred in 1899, nine years after Alex was born. Their marriage ended in divorce in 1911. She died in 1920.

== Early life and family ==
The daughter of Albert A. Hall and his wife Marion J. Hall, Annie Josephine "Josie" Hall was born in East Greenwich, Rhode Island, in 1865. Her parents descended from early American settlers to New England and were very religious. They opposed their daughter's ambitions as an actress, and she ran away from home in order to have a stage career. Her sister, Frances Hall, also had a career on the stage as an opera singer.

== Career ==
=== Early career with Edward E. Rice ===
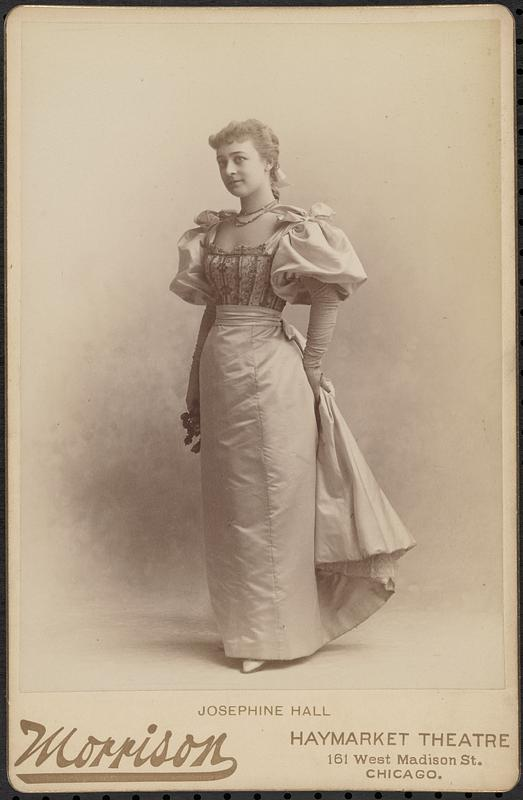
Josephine Hall

In her early career Hall performed under the stage name Josie Hall. In 1883 she performed with Rice's Surprise Party, a theater troupe managed by producer Edward E. Rice, as the young maid Jeanette in Pop for performances in Maryland, Maine, and Ohio. On Christmas Eve of 1883 she made her New York stage debut in this show at the Fourteenth Street Theatre. She continued to tour in Pop in 1884 for performances in Missouri, Illinois, Michigan, and upstate New York. When the tour reached Pittsburgh, Pennsylvania, in March 1884, Hall quit the show along with other performers because the producers had not been paying the actors their salaries. In July 1884 she returned to Rice's reorganized company of Pop in which she succeeded May Stembler in the larger role of Adele Pop. The resumed tour included performances in Iowa, Massachusetts, and California.

After the conclusion of the 1883–1884 season, Hall was hired by Eugene Tompkins of the Boston Theatre to star in Zanita in the trouser role of Prince Huon. This original work was co-authored by Tompkins and Dexter Smith. Its premiere on September 16, 1884, received a glowing review in The Boston Globe. It played there until December 1884 when it toured to the Academy of Music in Philadelphia. It then toured in the early months of 1885 to the Academy of Music in Baltimore and McVicker's Theater in Chicago.

By April 1885 Hall had joined a theater troupe headlined by Lillian Russell and managed by Rice, with whom she made her Broadway debut at the Casino Theatre as Sarah in James Mortimer and Edward Solomon's operetta Polly, or The Pet of the Regiment, on April 27, 1885. It played there through June 19, 1885. Immediately following this show, the same company remained at the Casino Theatre with a production of Billee Taylor in which Hall portrayed the part of Susan.

Hall remained with Rice's company for the 1885–1886 season as Eulalie in the revival of Rice's Evangeline, which had a lengthy run at the Fourteenth Street Theatre. When the production left New York for Chicago in May 1886, she did not continue with the show but returned to Rhode Island to spend the summer performing in the plays Under the Gaslight and The Two Orphans at the Providence Opera House. She later returned to Evangeline in May 1887 for a production produced by Rice at the Hollis Street Theatre in Boston.

In September 1887 Hall was with Rice's Surprise Party once again in a short-lived production of Eduard Holst and Woolson Morse's Circus in Town at the Bijou Opera House. She played a flying trapeze artist in this show.

=== Performances from 1886 to 1889 ===
In the autumn of 1886 Hall joined the theater company of Eben Plympton to perform as Baby Blanchemayne in the play Jack by Mrs. Harry Beckett (widow of the actor Harry Beckett). The tour of this show included a brief stop on Broadway at Wallack's Theatre in early November 1886, after which it played at the Park Theatre in Boston and the Brooklyn Theater in late 1886. In 1887 she continued to tour in the production to theaters in Kentucky, Indiana, Missouri, and Illinois before returning with the show for further performances on Broadway at the Fifth Avenue Theatre in February 1887.

In November 1887 Hall returned to Wallack's Theatre in T. W. Robertson's School, which was produced by Henry Eugene Abbey. Not long after this production she became severely ill and was not able to continue performing. It was reported in the American press in July 1888 that she had gone to Europe to convalesce and there had married a German baron. While in Europe in this period she studied acting with François Jules Edmond Got in Paris. She returned to the stage in October 1888, replacing Maude Adams in The Paymaster at Niblo's Garden.

On June 11, 1889, Hall created the role of Abdallah in the world premiere of Clay M. Greene, Fred J. Eustis, Richard Maddern, and John Joseph Braham Sr.'s Blue Beard, Jr. at the Grand Opera House, Chicago. The work was a critical triumph. Hall's performance of its "Cigarette Song" was popular with Chicago audiences. She left the production for New York in July 1889 to join the theater troupe of Frederick Hallen and Joseph Hart in their company's production of the musical farce Later On. She toured nationally in this production in 1889–1890.

=== Work with Charles Frohman in the 1890s ===
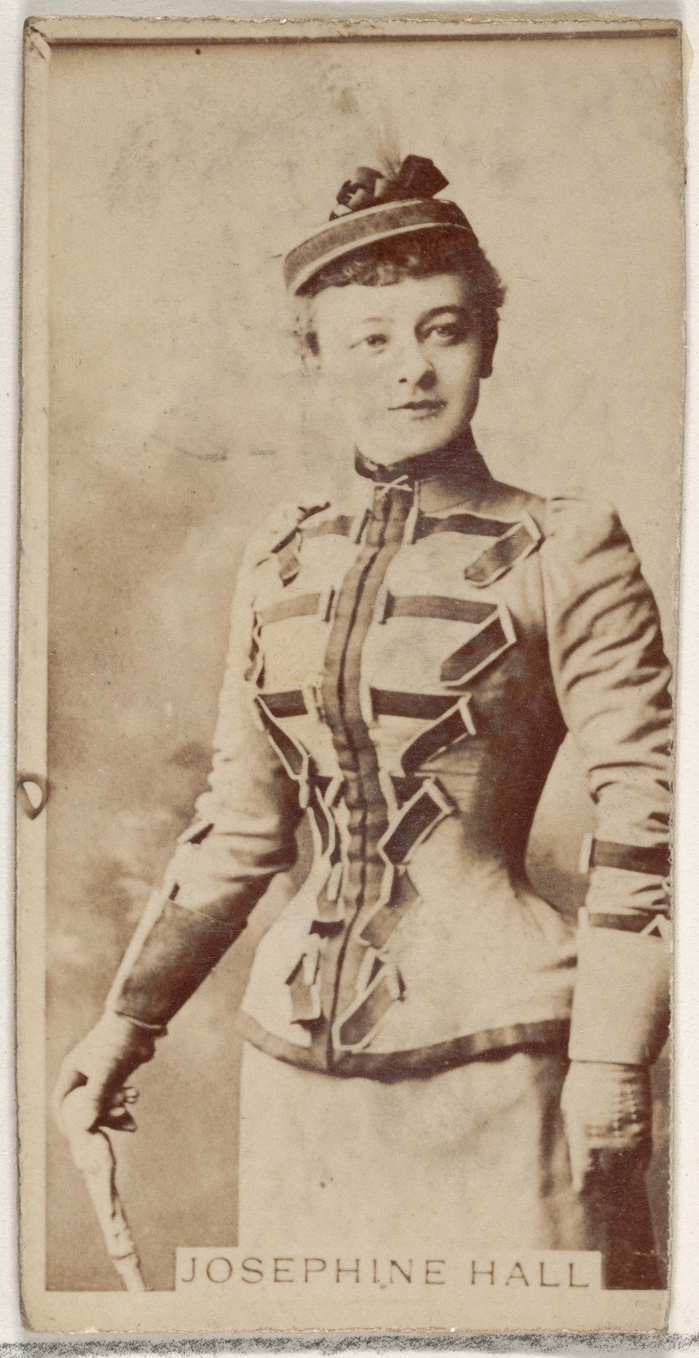
Josephine Hall

On May 15, 1890, Hall gave birth in Philadelphia to Alexander A. Aarons, her child by the Broadway composer and producer Alfred E. Aarons. Hall and Aarons married a little over nine years later in December 1899. Immediately following the birth of their son in 1890, Hall began touring under the management of Charles Frohman, who oversaw her career through the 1890s. One of the plays he was responsible for producing was Bronson Howard's Civil War drama Shenandoah in which Hall portrayed Jenny Buckthorn. This production began its tour at the Hyperion Theatre in New Haven, Connecticut, in May 1890. It then toured Connecticut, Delaware, Massachusetts, upstate New York, Pennsylvania, and Virginia. By Christmas of 1890, the production was playing in Alabama. It continued to tour nationally in early 1891 with Hall in the cast.

Another play produced under the management of Frohman in which Hall appeared was William Gillette's All the Comforts of Home. Hall portrayed Emily Pettibone in this work's April 1891 run at Herrmann's Theatre at Broadway and 29th Street in New York. It then played at the Park Theatre in Brooklyn in September 1891. The following month she resumed performing in Shenandoah at the Columbus Theatre in Upper Manhattan. In late 1891 she toured in Shenandoah to Washington D.C., Pittsburgh, and Chicago. By February 1892 she was no longer being billed as Josie Hall in the Shenandoah production but was credited as Josephine Hall, the name which she used in her later career. She was still in the Shenandoah tour as late as March 1892 when it was playing at the Grand Opera House in Boston.

On November 7, 1892, Hall performed in the world premiere of Bronson Howard's Aristocracy at the New National Theatre in Washington D.C. which was co-produced by Frohman and Al Hayman. She played the role of Katherine Ten Broeck Lawrence in this production, which transferred to Broadway's Palmer's Theatre immediately after its premiere in Washington D.C. The production left New York for Ford's Grand Opera House in Baltimore where it opened on February 13, 1893. It then toured to cities including Chicago, Louisville, St. Louis, and Boston. When the tour went on hiatus in the summer of 1893 she returned to her family's home in Greenwich, Rhode Island. She returned to the tour in September 1893, and remained in it until December 1893 when she left temporarily after learning about the death of her father. She continued to tour in the production as late as April 1894.

In August 1894 a revival of Shenandoah produced by Frohman opened at the Academy of Music in New York City with Hall returning to the part of Jenny Buckthorn. She once again toured nationally in this work in the 1894–1895 season. She left the tour in March 1895. She next performed the role of Victorine in The Gay Parisians, Frohman's American adaptation of the French play L'Hôtel du libre échange. It premiered at the Star Theatre in Buffalo on September 18, 1895, before playing on Broadway at Hoyt's Theatre.

=== Performances from 1896 to 1899 ===
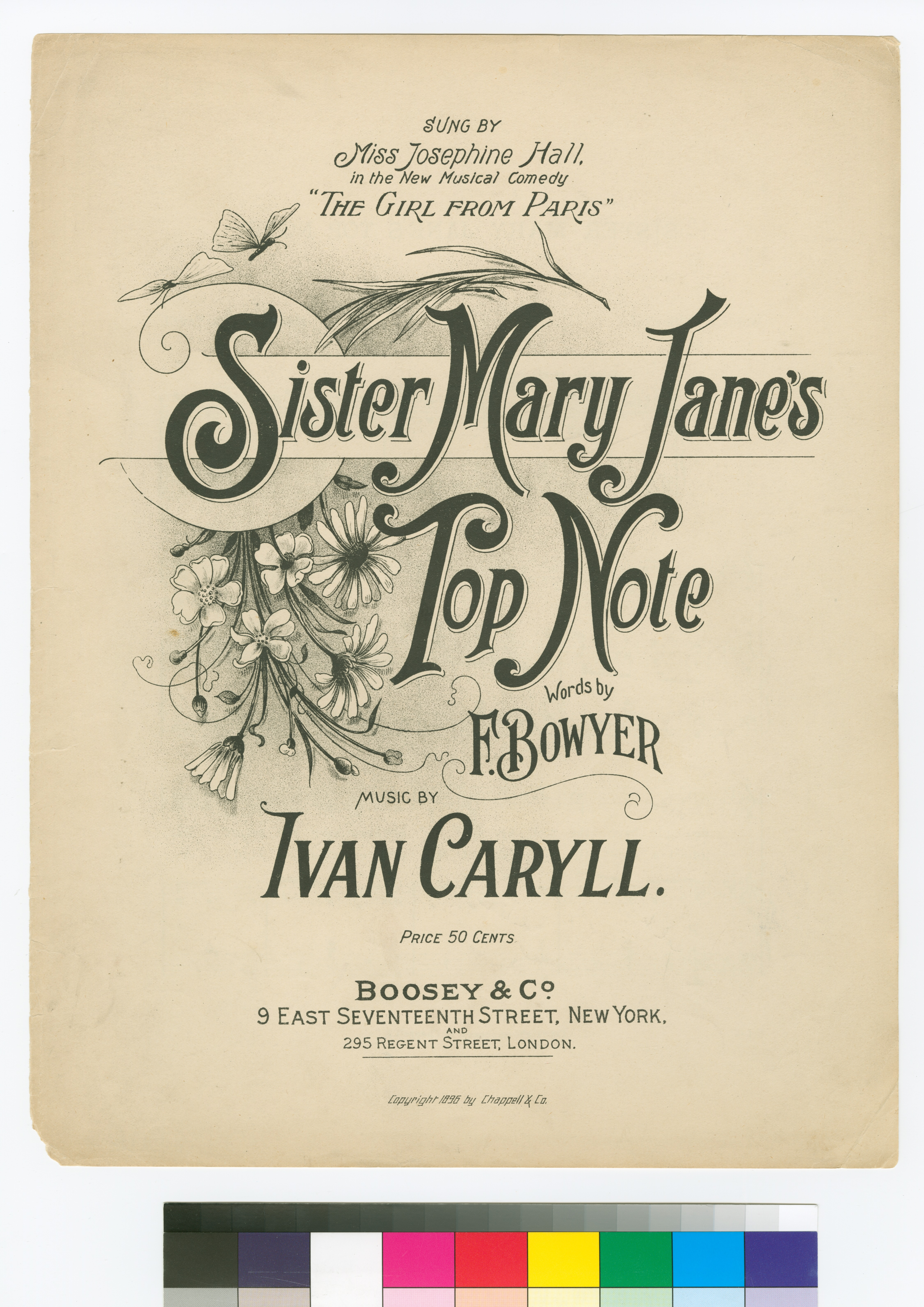
Cover to the sheet music for "Sister Mary Jane's Top Note"

In November 1896 it was announced that Frohman had struck a deal with Edward E. Rice to loan out Josephine Hall (who was still under contract with Frohman) for the upcoming Broadway production of The Girl From Paris, in which she was cast as Ruth. This work was an adaptation of the Edwardian musical comedy The Gay Parisienne by George Dance and it premiere at the Herald Square Theatre on December 8, 1896. It was the hit Broadway production of the 1896–1897 season, and Hall's lauded performance as Ruth brought her fame in the United States. She was particularly celebrated for her performance of the song "Sister Mary Jane's Top Note" in which she deliberately sang a high off-key note at the end to great comedic effect. She toured nationally in this part during the 1897–1898 season.

Hall next performed in the United States premiere of Mark Ambient, Alban Atwood, and Russell Vaun's Oh, Susannah! at the Hyperion Theatre in Connecticut on February 3, 1898. She portrayed the lead female role of the maid Aurora in this production, a character similar to the one she had taken on in A Girl from Paris. The production moved to Broadway where it opened at Hoyt's Theatre on February 7, 1898. It closed there after eight weeks of performances on April 2, 1898, and then went on a brief tour.

In the summer of 1898 Hall appeared in the comic part of Measles in Cook's Tour by playwright Joseph W. Herbert and composer Max Gabriel (1861–1942) at Koster & Bial's Music Hall. She remained at that theater the following autumn in multiple burlesque shows. One of these was In Gotham in which she performed a comedy routine with Richard Carle, and another was a send up of the play Cyrano de Bergerac which was then playing at the Garden Theatre. She took a break from performance beginning in late 1898 after experiencing appendicitis that necessitated an appendectomy in early December 1898.

On February 10, 1899, Hall left New York aboard The Mexico, an American passenger steamship, which carried her and a vaudeville company she led to American Cuba for a short four-day long performance tour. She then rejoined the touring production of The Girl from Paris for further performances as Ruth beginning in Philadelphia in March 1899. During the first portion of the 1899–1900 season she portrayed Fraline in the Broadway production of The Girl from Maxim's, another work for which she was celebrated, although more so outside of New York where the show was more warmly received. She toured in this production after its Broadway run ended in October 1899. She was still with the tour in mid-February 1900 when it was playing at the Boston Museum.

=== Later career in the 1900s ===
Hall left the tour of The Girl from Maxim's to take on the title role in a new musical Mam'selle 'Awkins, which produced by her husband, Alfred E. Aarons. Aarons co-wrote the music to this show with Herman Perlot, and the work's libretto was written by Richard Carle. It played at the Victoria Theatre located at 201 West 42nd Street from February 26 through March 31, 1900, just 35 performances. In October of that same year she returned to Broadway in another musical featuring music by Aarons, portraying Fleurette d'Norville in The Military Maid at the Savoy Theatre. She later appeared in a comic opera by Aarons, the part of Anastasia in The Ladies Paradise, which was performed at the old Metropolitan Opera House on 39th Street in September 1901.

On Christmas Eve 1900 the comic opera A Royal Rogue opened at the Broadway Theatre with Hall in the role of Stephanie. It ran there for 30 performances and closed on January 19, 1901. She returned to Broadway for one final appearance in June 1903 as Mehitabel Merton in The Knickerbocker Girl.

== Later life and death ==
After 1903 Hall's performance career slowed and then stopped. She briefly came out of retirement in 1910 after a six year absence from the theater in Klaw & Erlanger's production of The Air King. Her marriage with Alfred E. Aarons ended in divorce in 1911. Aarons married his second wife, the actress Leila Hughes, in 1915.

Josephine Hall died on December 5, 1920, in Apponaug, Warwick, Rhode Island, at the home of her sister Frances, who had married Eugene Chesebro. She had been ill for eight months prior to her death.
