= Clay M. Greene =

American playwright (1850–1933)

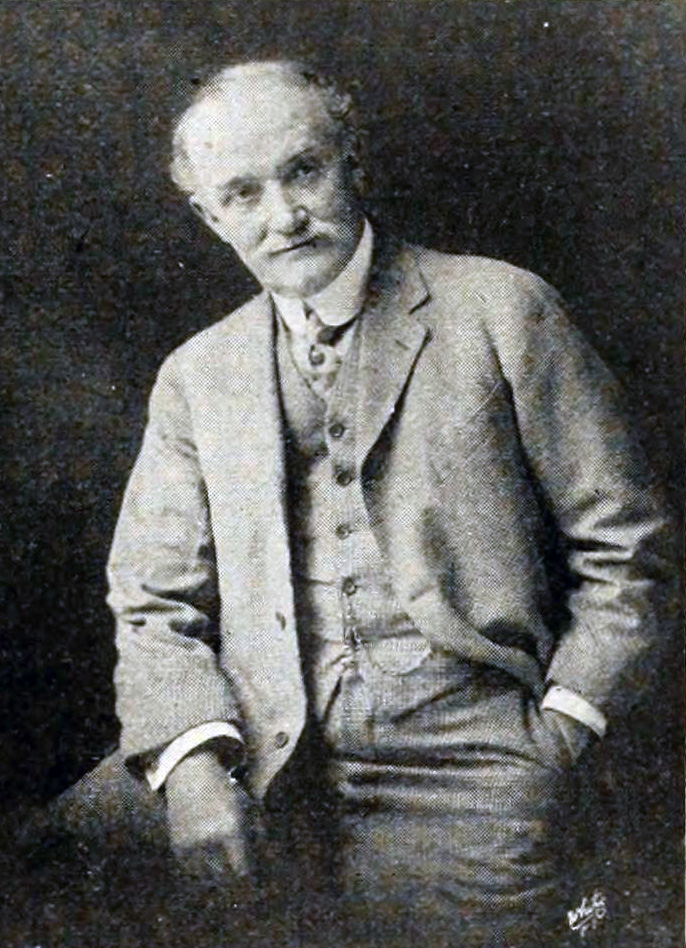
- Greene in 1916

Shepherd of The Lambs
- In office 1891-98 – 1902-06
- Preceded by: E. M. Holland
- Succeeded by: Thomas B. Clarke

Personal details
- Born: March 12, 1850 San Francisco, California, U.S.
- Died: September 5, 1933 (aged 83) San Francisco, California, U.S.
- Spouses: Alice Randolph Wheeler (first); Laura Hewett Robinson (second)
- Relatives: Harry Ashland Greene (brother)
- Occupation: Playwright

Clay Meredith Greene (March 12, 1850 – September 5, 1933) was an American screenwriter, theatre critic and journalist, but he was chiefly known as a dramatist. He was often referred to as either the "first American" or "first white American child" born in San Francisco, a claim spread by Greene himself. A graduate of Santa Clara University (SCU), Greene was the author of the Passion Play Nazareth which was written for and staged as part of the 50th anniversary celebration of the founding of SCU in 1901. The play was performed repeatedly every three years at SCU during Greene's lifetime.

He began his professional life as a stockbroker and journalist. With his brother Harry Ashland Greene, he co-founded the brokerage firm Greene & Company. While working in that field, he began writing plays, his first being Struck Oil (1874). By 1878, Greene had moved to New York City, where he was soon working as both a playwright and journalist. He and his wife lived in a home in Bayside, Queens, for approximately thirty years. He wrote an estimated 80 plays and musicals, several of which were staged on Broadway. His plays brought him wealth and popular celebrity during his lifetime, but none of his works endured after his death.

With playwright Steele Mackaye, Greene co-founded the American Dramatic Author's Society in 1878, the first U.S. organization dedicated to protecting the rights of dramatists. He served as the president of the New York City arts social club The Lambs (called "The Shepherd") from 1891 to 1898, and again from 1902 to 1906. Financial problems forced him to sell his estate on Long Island not long after he married his second wife in 1911, when he moved back to San Francisco. From 1913 to 1916, he worked as a screenwriter for the Lubin Manufacturing Company, also occasionally as an actor on camera and as a film director. He remained in San Francisco until his death in 1933.

== Early life and education ==
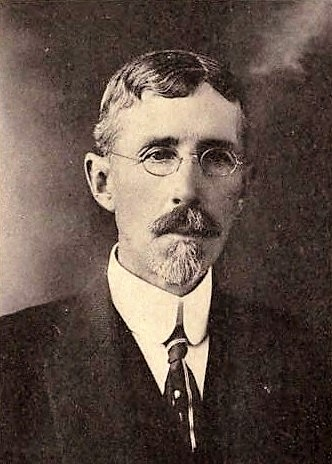
Harry Ashland Greene

Clay Meredith Greene was born on March 12, 1850, in San Francisco, California, to William Harrison Greene and his wife Anne Elizabeth Fisk. Some sources claim he was the "first American born in San Francisco", although his obituary in The New York Times was careful to point out that he was born six months before the California Statehood Act. This assertion originated with Greene himself, who claimed that he was "the first American white child born in San Francisco". While it is possible that he was the first white child born in San Francisco when it was a mining supply camp in 1850, the historicity of this claim was questioned by reporters, who pointed out that white children were likely born at the Mission San Francisco de Asís much earlier, during the Spanish colonial period. Greene was the grandson of Squire Fiske, who served as a first lieutenant in the 1st Rhode Island Regiment during the American Revolution. As his descendant, Greene was an active member of the Sons of the American Revolution.

Clay grew up in a house his father built on San Francisco's Telegraph Hill. As a child, he was enthralled by the theatre business that blossomed in San Francisco during the California gold rush. As a teenager he became a regular theatregoer, and he both acted in and wrote amateur burlesques and other plays. He was educated at the College of California (now University of California), when it was located in Oakland, California. At that time the school was a college preparatory school, so Greene did not earn a university diploma from that institution. He did however attend City College of San Francisco and Santa Clara University (SCU), earning a degree from SCU. His parents sent Clay to SCU in 1867, encouraging him pursue a career in medicine or law, but his university education only increased his interest in theatre.

Clay returned to his native San Francisco in 1870, where he worked as a journalist and as a stockbroker. He initially worked on his own, but eventually he partnered with his younger brother, Harry Ashland Greene. The two co-founded the stock brokerage firm Greene & Company. While working as a stockbroker and journalist, he continued to write plays and act, including performing the role of Dick Deadeye in the comic opera H.M.S. Pinafore at San Francisco's Standard Theater.

== Playwright ==
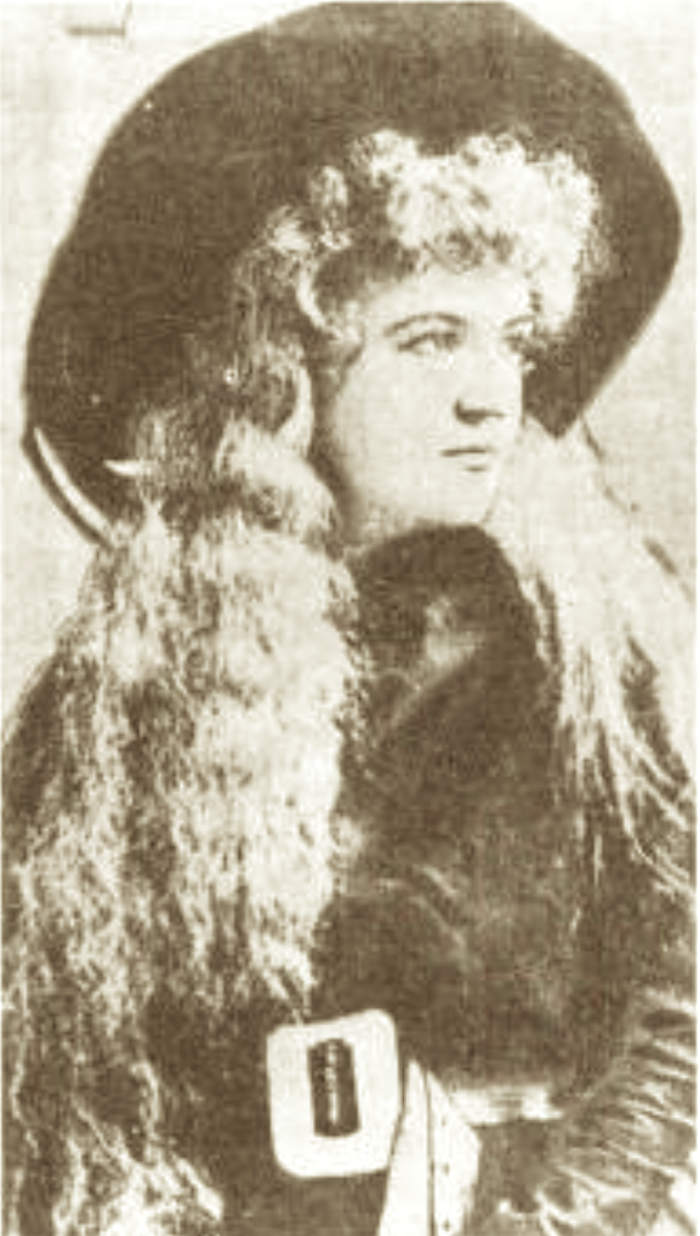
Kate Mayhew in the title role of M'liss by Greene and A. Sisson Thompson

Between the years 1874 and 1925, Greene wrote approximately eighty plays, opera libretti, and musicals (book, lyrics or both). He was one of a group of American playwrights who emerged during the 1870s, including Augustin Daly, Bronson Howard, James J. McCloskey Jr., and Thomas Blades de Walden, that provided a new surge of popular melodramas and comedies to the American theatre. In 1878, Greene and playwright Steele Mackaye co-founded the American Dramatic Author's Society, the first organization in the United States created to protect the rights of dramatists. It was short-lived and was supplanted by a series of similarly short-lived organizations until the Dramatists Guild of America was formed in 1919.

Many of Greene's plays, particularly his early and late ones, were first staged in his native San Francisco. Three of his successful plays were set during the California Gold Rush: M'liss (1877), based on a story by Bret Harte and co-authored with A. Slason Thompson); Chispa (1882, co-authored with Thompson); and The Golden Giant (1886). During most of his career as a dramatist, however, he lived and worked in New York City. His plays were performed widely throughout the United States during his lifetime, and he achieved wealth through his work as a playwright. but none of his works remain in the Western canon of theatre literature.

=== Early writing career ===
Greene began a journalism career in San Francisco, writing for The Golden Era in 1870. He also wrote for its competing paper, The Argonaut. His earliest success as a dramatist was the play Struck Oil which he adapted for actor J. C. Williamson from Sam Smith's play The Dead, or Five Years Away. Premiered in 1874, Struck Oil became a hit for Williamson, who toured in the work in both the United States and Australia. That same year he wrote the four-act play The Cut Glove for the comic duo P. F. Baker and T. J. Farron, which they toured in the southern United States.

With A. G. Thompson, Greene co-wrote the play Freaks of Fortune, which premiered at the Grand Opera House in San Francisco in 1877. Williamson acquired the rights to the work after its original successful run and brought the play to the Boston stage. Williamson and his company performed other plays by Greene at The Boston Theatre in 1878, including Struck Oil and The Chinese Question.

Actress Kate Mayhew owned the rights to an 1873 play by Richard H. Cox based on the popular story "The Work on Red Mountain" by Bret Harte, which had been serialized from 1860 to 1863. Its central figure is a feisty miner's daughter, Melissa Smith, aka "M'liss". Dissatisfied with Cox's writing, Mayhew hired Greene to substantially rewrite the play. Greene's version, titled M'liss, premiered in 1877, at the New Market Theater in Old Town Historic District of Portland, Oregon, and a subsequent run immediately followed at the California Theatre in San Francisco. M'liss was well received in Portland but had a lukewarm reception in San Francisco. Mayhew asked Greene to rework the final act of the play, and he began work in late 1877, but, according to Mayhew, he ultimately abandoned this project to A. Sisson Thompson to finish, when Greene decided to leave San Francisco and relocate to New York City. Greene and Thompson copyrighted the play as M'liss, A Romance of Red Mountains in February 1878, a copyright which Mayhew disputed in court later that year.

=== New York City dramatist ===
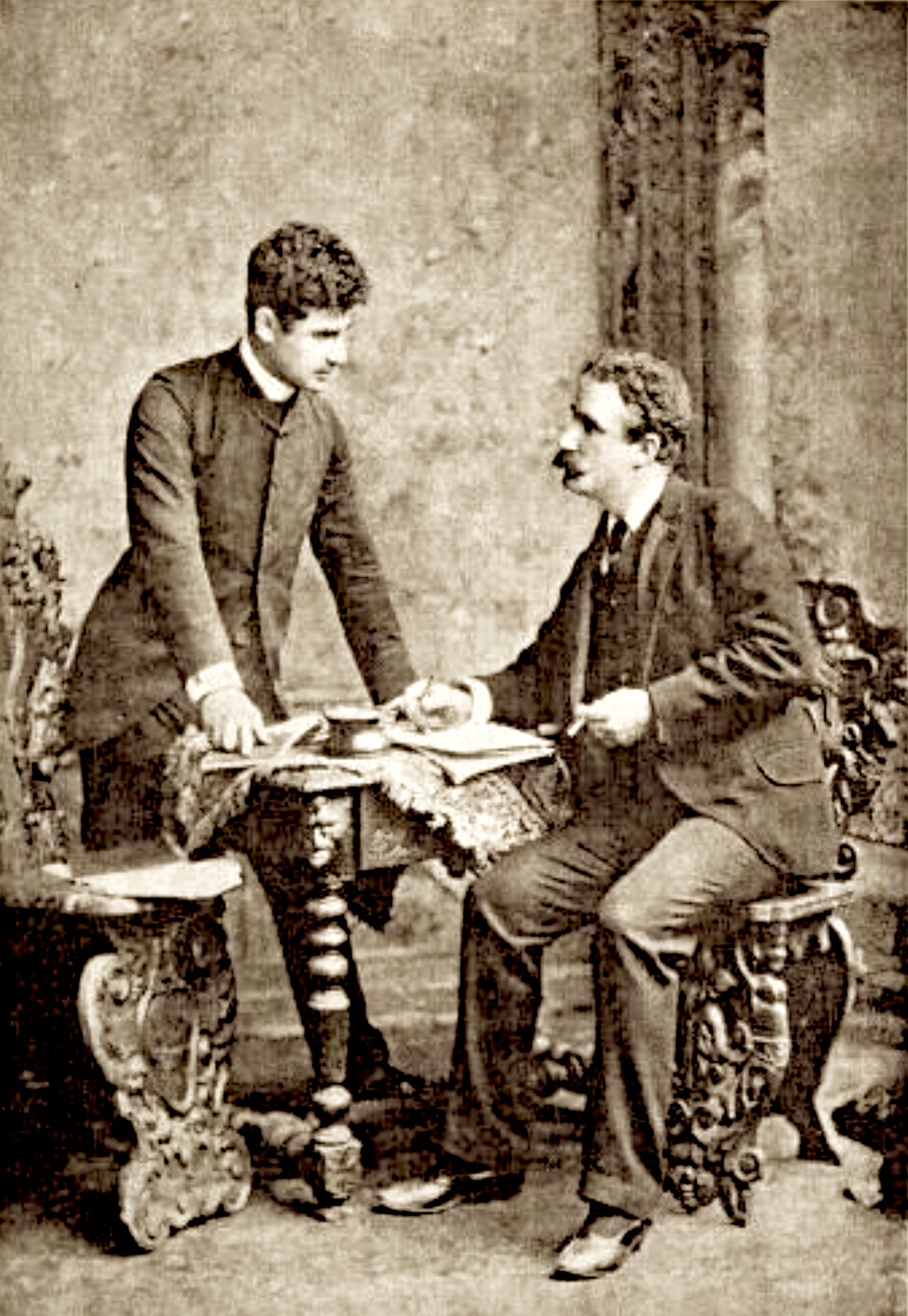
David Belasco and Greene in New York in 1887

In 1878, Greene moved to New York City, where, by 1879, he had established himself as a journalist and playwright. There he had his most active years as a dramatist, becoming well known among the literary establishment, including befriending Mark Twain. Greene and his first wife resided at a home in Bayside, Queens, for thirty years until her death.

==== 1880s ====
With Slauson Thompson, Greene co-authored the four act farce Sharps and Flats as a starring vehicle for the comedy duo of Robson and Crane. A send-up of the speculative New York stock market and its buyers during the Gilded Age, it premiered at the Standard Theatre on Broadway in 1880. Greene and Thompson collaborated on a second play, Chispa, which was produced by David Belasco at the Baldwin Theater in San Francisco in 1881.

In 1883, Greene collaborated with the Hanlon Brothers acrobats on the play Pico; or, The legend of Castle Molfi, later reworked as the fairy pantomime Fantasma, which had a long stage life in the Hanlon Brothers repertoire. He also worked with the Hanlon Brothers that year on a revised version of their musical Le Voyage en Suisse. Greene was hired to write a play for the Grand Opera House in Toronto on the life and death of Canadian politician and resistance movement leader Louis Riel, who had just been hanged on November 16, 1885. Greene rapidly produced the play, Louis Riel, or, The Northwest Rebellion, and it premiered in Toronto with a cast of New York actors on New Year's Day 1886.

In 1886, Greene wrote his first original musical, Sybil, with the composer John F. Mitchell. The same year his play The Golden Giant was produced by Charles Frohman at Broadway's Fifth Avenue Theatre in a production starring McKee Rankin and his wife Kitty Blanchard. While successful in New York, the play was a flop on the road and lost Frohman a considerable amount of money. 1887 was highly productive for Greene, beginning with the musical play Hans the Boatman, which he created for the Theatre Royal, Sheffield, in England, to start the Swiss-born English actor Charles Arnold (1854–1905), who portrayed the title character. The most successful musical of Greene's career, it was a tremendous hit for Arnold, who toured the piece for three years across Australia, Asia, and the United States. Greene also wrote the libretto to the 1887 musical Our Jennie, starring Jennie Yeamans, which was staged on Broadway at the People's Theatre. That same year he co-authored the play Pawn Ticket 210 with Belasco for Lotta Crabtree; it premiered at McVicker's Theater in Chicago.

In 1888, Greene's play adaptation of Harriet Beecher Stowe's novel Uncle Tom's Cabin premiered at the Hollis Street Theatre in Boston. He served as the lyricist of the musical Blue Beard, Jr., composed by Fred J. Eustis, Richard Maddern, and John Joseph Braham Sr. It premiered at the Grand Opera House, Chicago, in 1889, and then toured nationally, including a stop on Broadway at Niblo's Garden in 1890.

==== 1890s ====
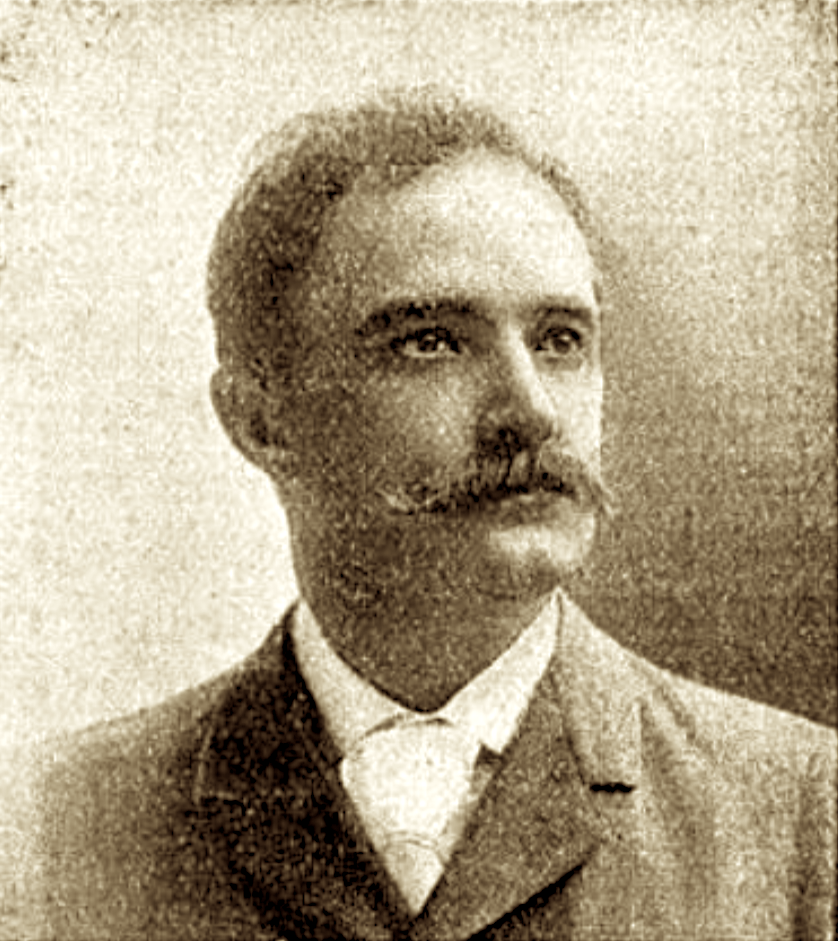
Clay M. Greene c. 1893

Greene wrote the book of the musical Peti, the Vagabond, which starred Hubert Wilke in the title role and premiered at the California Theatre in San Francisco in 1890. He co-authored the 1892 play The New South with actor Joseph R. Grismer, about racial animus in the Southern United States after the American Civil War. The story followed a white United States Army captain sent by the U.S. government to arrest individuals illegally making and selling moonshine. The captain's support of African Americans in that community puts him at odds with the white southerners, and his life is threatened. While the authors intended to critique racial prejudice, the work propagated racial stereotypes, and theatre scholars James Fisher and Felicia Hardison Londré described both it and a 1916 silent film adaptation of the play as "exploitive".

Greene collaborated with J. Cheever Goodwin on the book of the musical Africa, which premiered in San Francisco in June 1893 prior to its Broadway run later that year at Star Theatre. He soon followed this with the libretto to a comic opera, The Maid of Plymouth, based on the story of Plymouth Colony historical figures Priscilla Alden and Myles Standish. Henry Wadsworth Longfellow's narrative poem The Courtship of Miles Standish was an inspiration for the musical. The Bostonians premiered the piece in Chicago in November 1893. It opened at the Broadway Theatre on January 15, 1894, starring Margaret Reid as Priscilla and Eugene Cowles as Myles.

With composer William Furst, Greene adapted Victor Roger's 1892 operetta Les 28 jours de Clairette (libretto by Hippolyte Raymond and Antony Mars) Greene's version, titled The Little Trooper (or Little Miss Trooper), was crafted as a starring vehicle for Della Fox. It opened at Broadway's Casino Theatre on August 30, 1894. Greene's 1894 play Under the Polar Star was a murder mystery investigating the death of the leader of an expedition in the Arctic. It was adapted by David Belasco for an 1896 production on Broadway at the Academy of Music.

Greene partnered with the playwright Ben Teal to craft the melodrama On Broadway (1896) starring Maggie Cline. The play had music by David Braham and featured Cline singing songs like John W. Kelly's "Throw Him Down, McCloskey". Greene wrote the book to Ludwig Englander's musical In Gay Paree, which ran at the Casino Theatre in 1899.

==== 1900s ====
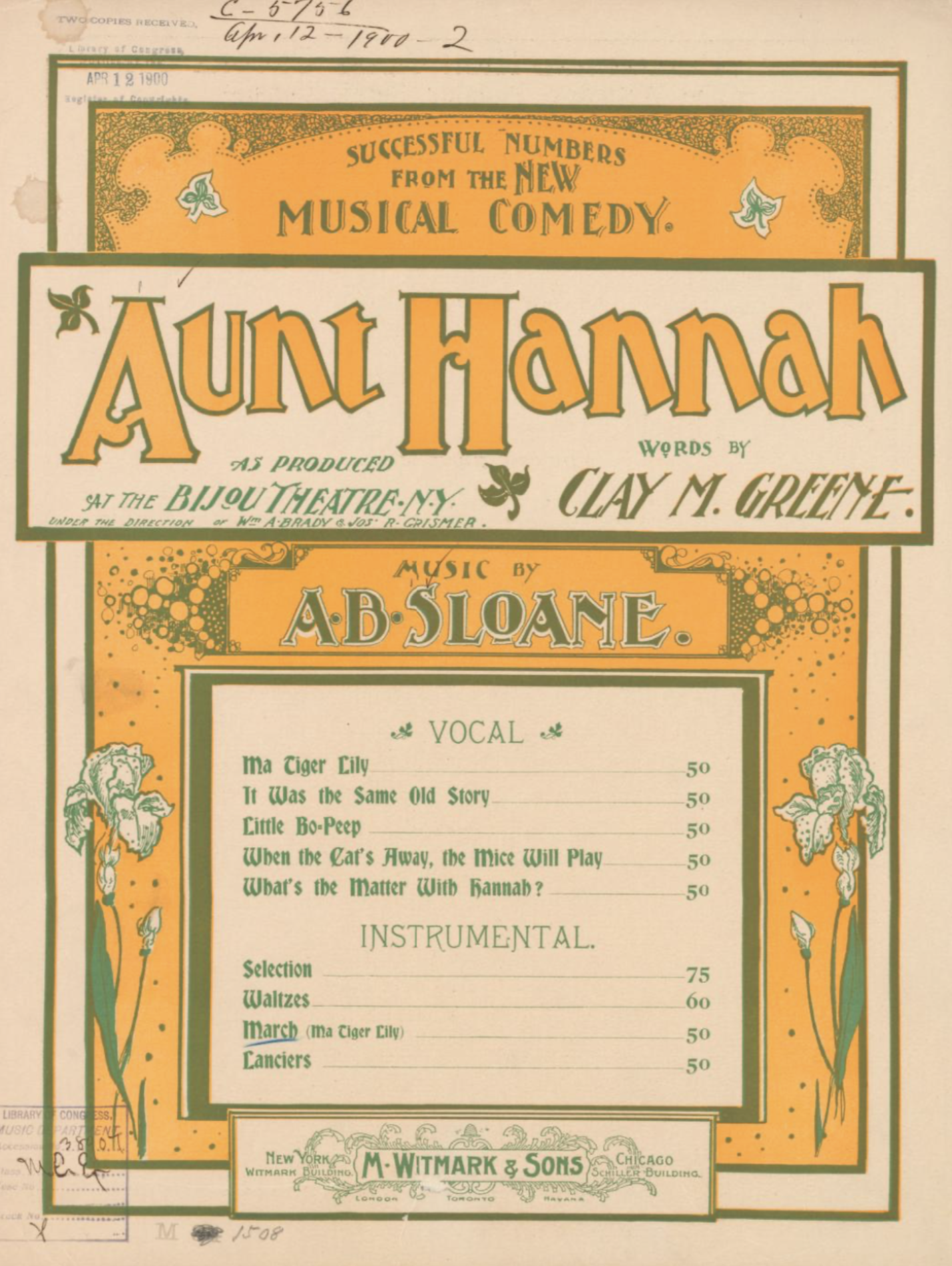
Front cover of 1900 sheet music for Aunt Hannah

Greene wrote the lyrics to the musical Aunt Hannah, which premiered on Broadway at the Bijou Theatre in February 1900. This musical featured Greene's most successful song, "My Tiger Lily" (or "Ma Tiger Lily"). A month later, a second Broadway musical with a book by Greene, The Regatta Girl, was staged at Koster & Bial's Music Hall. When Broadway producer John C. Fisher decided to bring the 1901 English musical The Silver Slipper to the United States for the first time, he had Greene Americanize the musical's original book by Owen Hall. Other plays he was known for included Forgiven (1886) and A Man from the West (1900).

For the Golden Jubilee celebration of the founding of Santa Clara University (SCU), Greene penned a Passion Play staged at the university in 1901, titled Nazareth. Greene modeled it after the Oberammergau Passion Play. It was subsequently repeated at SCU every three years. It was also staged by The Lambs in 1902. SCU later awarded Greene an honorary doctorate.

=== The Lambs ===
Greene was a prominent member of The Lambs, a New York City social club that nurtures those active in the arts. Greene served as the president of The Lambs (called "The Shepherd") from 1891 to 1898, and again from 1902 to 1906. With Augustus Thomas serving as his boy (The Lamb's term for vice-president), Greene played an important role in The Lambs history. Together, Greene and Thomas successfully led the organization out of financial troubles, with Greene notably using his own money to prevent the club from defaulting on its bills and closing by personally paying off the club's debts with his own money in 1894. Greene and Thomas also acquired the organization's first permanent building, initiated The Lambs annual "gambols" (a public variety show), and almost doubled the size of the organization's membership.

Greene was also responsible for re-instituting The Lamb's "annual wash", an elaborate costumed event with a different theme each year. Beginning in 1895, he personally hosted the annual event at Los Olmos, his estate in Bayside, Queens. He also utilized his gift as a writer for The Lambs, penning more than 100 dramatic and comedic sketches for various entertainments and events put on by the club during his time with the organization. Fellow Lamb member and impressionist painter Robert Reid, painted a portrait of Greene which hangs in the Lambs club. In 1933, the year of his death, Greene was the first person to be awarded the title "Immortal Lamb" in the history of the club. The title is given only to a Lamb whose contributions led to the survival of the institution.

=== Later writing and film career in California ===
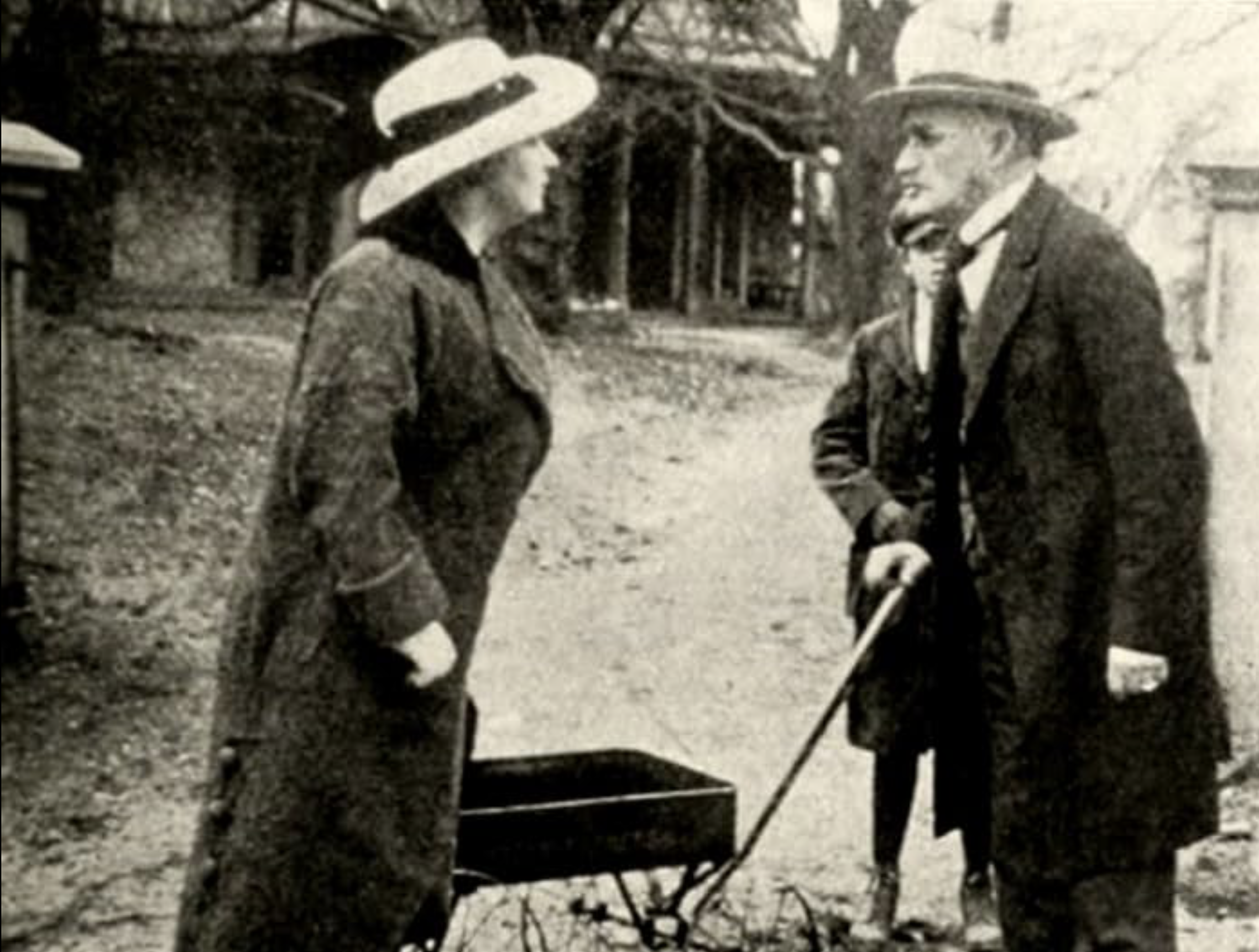
Louise Huff as Mrs. Dow and Greene as Mark Dow in the 1914 Lubin Manufacturing Company film Treasures on Earth; Greene wrote the story.

Greene returned to California after the death of his first wife, Alice Randolph Greene (née Wheeler), in 1910, and his subsequent marriage six months later to his second wife, the playwright Laura H. Robinson, in 1911. Greene had previously collaborated on several plays with Robinson and was 60 years old when he remarried. Financial problems prompted Greene to sell his Long Island estate. He returned to San Francisco following its sale.

In his later career, Greene's writing shifted towards writing for vaudeville, and he produced a large number of dramatic sketches for the medium in the 1910s and 1920s. He also became a screenwriter for silent films for the Lubin Manufacturing Company from 1913 to 1916, also occasionally acting in and directing their films.

Upon his return to San Francisco, Greene resumed an active membership in San Francisco's Bohemian Club (BC). His membership with the club extended back to the 1870s, and he maintained a connection to the organization during his years in New York City, attending and writing on the club's summer High Jinx entertainments at Bohemian Grove. He was a featured performer in the High Jinx entertainments in the summers of 1881 and 1886. He also frequently worked as a playwright for the organization's entertainments, penning most of the "Christmas Low Jinx" entertainments performed by the club in the 1890s. He wrote the poem "False Gods" for the High Jinx of 1891. With composer Genaro Saldierna he wrote a musical parody of fellow BC member Joseph Redding's The Land of Happiness in 1917 that was entitled The Land of Flabbiness. He also penned one of the Grove musical plays, writing the 1921 musical John of Nepomuk: Patron Saint of Bohemia in collaboration with composer Humphrey J. Stewart.

Greene befriended fellow Bohemian Club member Adolph B. Spreckels of the Spreckels Sugar Company. Spreckles and his wife, Alma de Bretteville Spreckels, used their philanthropy to build the Legion of Honor art museum in San Francisco. Greene was so moved by the groundbreaking ceremony of the museum in 1921 that he composed a poem, "The Groundbreaking", dedicated to the couple.

Greene also worked as a theatre critic for the San Francisco Journal.

== Later life and death ==
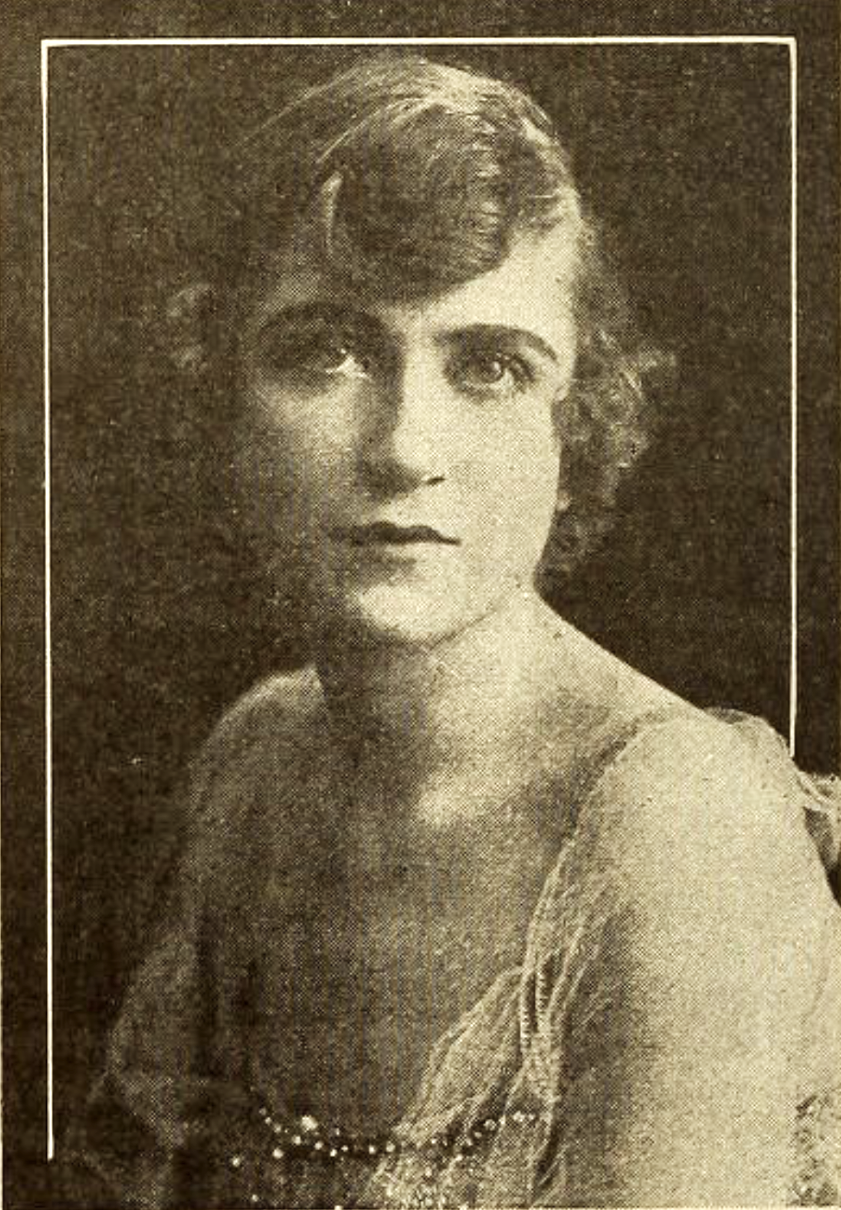
Actress Helen Greene, Greene's daughter

While visiting Los Angeles, Greene suffered from a vitreous hemorrhage in 1918 that caused him to lose sight suddenly in one of his eyes. He remained active in public life in San Francisco into his 80s. His last public appearance was at a performance of his Passion Play at Santa Clara University in the spring of 1933. In May 1933, he broke his hip and was unable to walk for the remainder of his life.

Clay M. Greene died on September 5, 1933, in San Francisco, California. His daughter from his first marriage, the actress Helen Greene (1896-1947), and his second wife were with him at the time of his death.

== Selected works ==
=== Books ===
- The Dispensation And Other Plays (1914)
- Venetia, Avenger of the Lusitania (1919)
- Verses of Love, Sentiment and Friendship (1921)
- In Memoriam: A Pageant of Friendship (1923)

=== Filmography ===
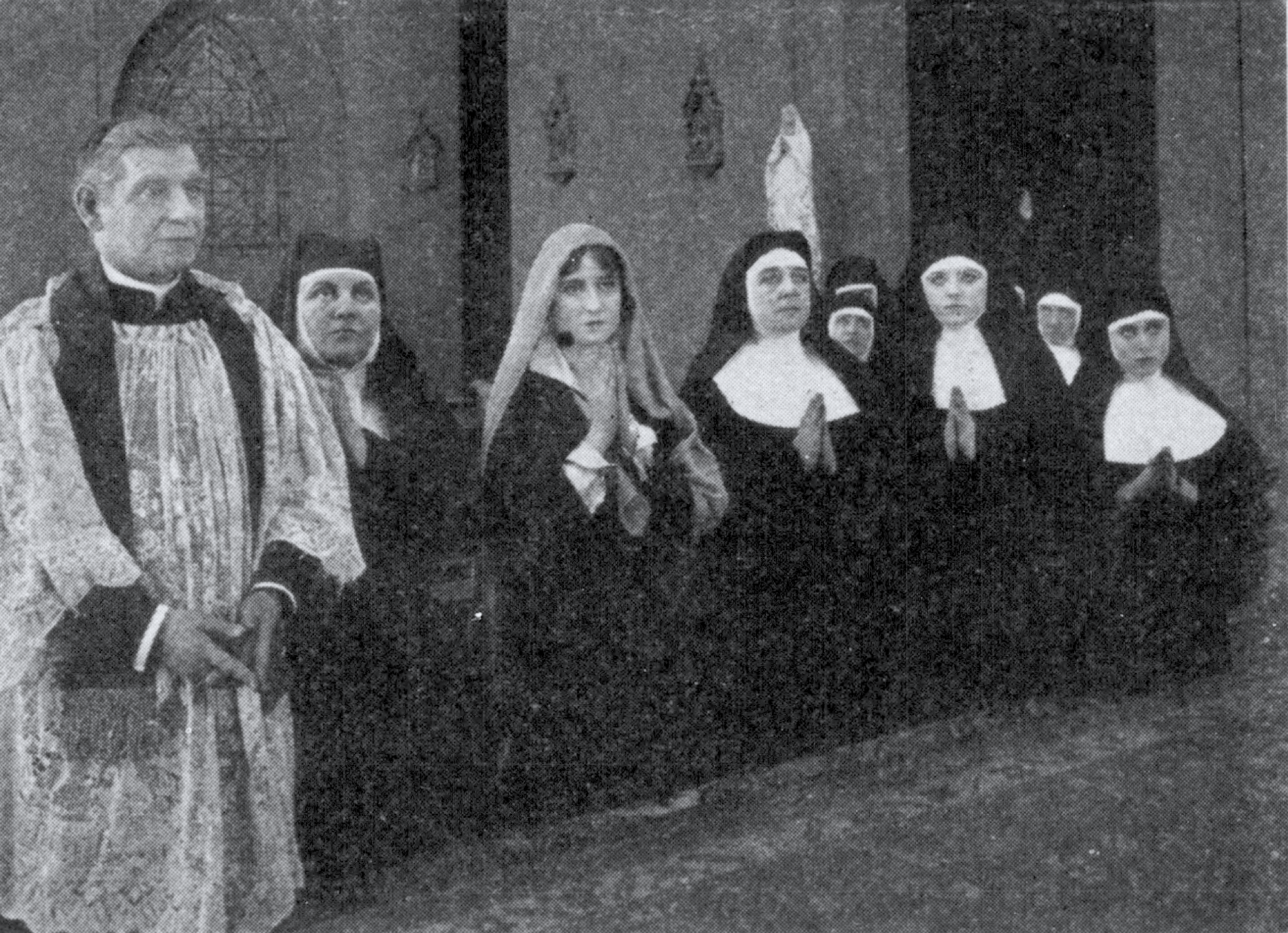
Still from The Uplift (1916) which Greene both wrote and directed

==== Actor ====
- Getting Atmosphere (1912, as The Gate Keeper; credited as C. E. Green)
- Her Educator (1912, as The Judge)
- A Humble Hero (1912, as The Prospector; credited as Daddy Green)
- A Motorcycle Adventure (1912, as John Martin)
- The Other Fellow (1912, as Jim)
- Through Fire to Fortune (1914, as Henry Barrett)
- Treasures on Earth (1914, as Mark Dow)

==== Director ====
- The Belle of Barnegate (1915)
- Beyond All Is Love (1915)
- The Ogre and the Girl (1915)
- Americans After All (1916)
- Father's Night Off (1916)
- Her Wayward Sister (1916)
- Hubby Puts One Over (1916)
- Jenkins' Jinx (1916)
- Love and Bullets (1916)
- Millionaire Billie (1916)
- Oh, You Uncle! (1916)
- Pickles and Diamonds (1916)
- Two Smiths and a Haff (1916)
- The Uplift (1916)
- The Voice in the Night (1916)
- The Winning Number (1916)

==== Screenwriter ====
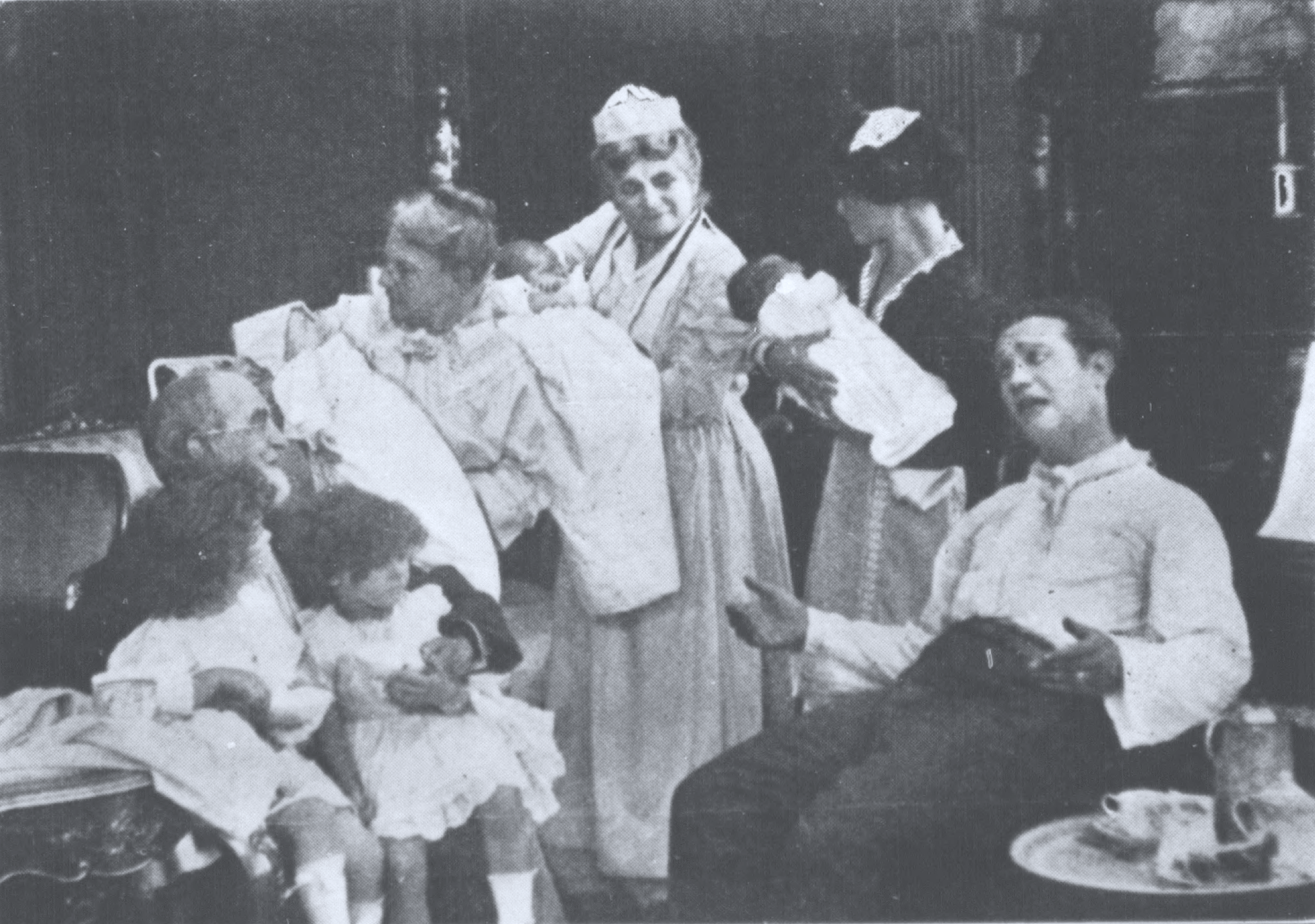
Still from the 1915 silent film Patsy Married and Settled

- The Fiancee and the Fairy (1913)
- A Waif of the Desert (1913)
- Forgiven; or, the Jack of Diamonds (1914)
- The Fortune Hunter (1914)
- The Girl at the Lock (1914)
- The House Next Door (1914)
- The Klondike Bubble (1914)
- Little Breeches (1914)
- Patsy at School (1914)
- The Sleeping Sentinel (1914)
- The Sorceress (1914)
- A Strange Melody (1914)
- Through Fire to Fortune, or, The Sunken Village (1914)
- Treasures on Earth (1914)
- The Trunk Mystery (1914)
- The Belle of Barnegate (1915)
- The Climbers (1915)
- The College Widow (1915)
- The District Attorney (1915)
- The Great Ruby (1915)
- It All Depends (1915)
- The Ogre and the Girl (1915)
- Patsy Among the Fairies (1915)
- Patsy Among the Smugglers (1915)
- Patsy at College (1915)
- Patsy at the Seashore (1915)
- Patsy's Elopement (1915)
- Patsy's First Love (1915)
- Patsy in a Seminary (1915)
- Patsy in Business (1915)
- Patsy in Town (1915)
- Patsy, Married and Settled (1915)
- Patsy on a Trolley Car (1915)
- Patsy on a Yacht (1915)
- Patsy's Vacation (1915)
- A Siren of Corsica (1915)
- The Sporting Duchess (1915)
- Sweeter Than Revenge (1915)
- A War Baby (1915)
- The White Mask (1915)
- Whom the Gods Would Destroy (1915)
- The Witness (1915)
- Billie's Double (1916)
- Dare Devil Bill (1916)
- The Evangelist (1916)
- Millionaire Billie (1916)
- Mr. Housekeeper (1916)
- The New South (1916)
- Two Smiths and a Haff (1916)
- The Uplift (1916)
- The Winning Number (1916)
- A Wise Waiter (1916)

==== Films adapted from plays by Greene by other writers ====
- M'Liss (1918, adapted by Frances Marion)
- Struck Oil (1919)
- Pawn Ticket 210 (1922)

=== Stage works ===
==== Plays ====
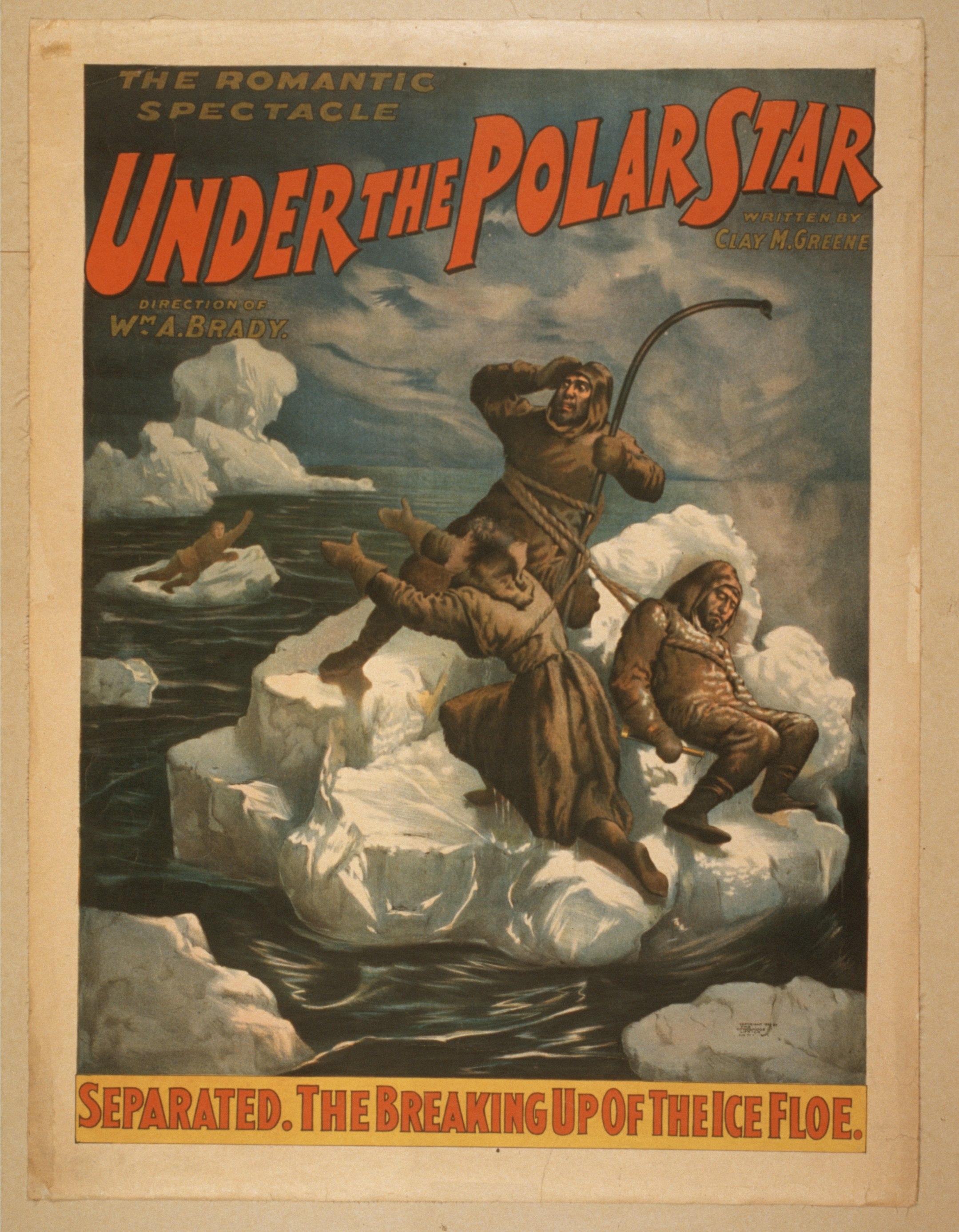
1896 lithograph for Under the Polar Star

- Struck Oil (1874)
- M'liss (1877, based on a story by Bret Harte; co-authored with A. Slason Thompson)
- Sharps and Flats (1880)
- Chispa (1882, co-authored with A. Slason Thompson)
- Louis Riel, or, The Northwest Rebellion (1886)
- The Golden Giant (1886)
- Uncle Tom's Cabin (1888, adapted from the novel by Harriet Beecher Stowe)
- Carl's Folly (1891)
- A High Roller (1891)
- For Money (1891, co-written with Augustus Thomas)
- The New South (1892)
- Under the Polar Star (1894)
- A Man from the West (1900)
- The Gentle Mr Bellew of France (1902)
- The Little Minister and His Mash, or A Very Hot Scotch (1902)
- Over a Welsh Rarebit (1903)
- For Love's Sweet Sake (1906)

==== Musicals and operas ====
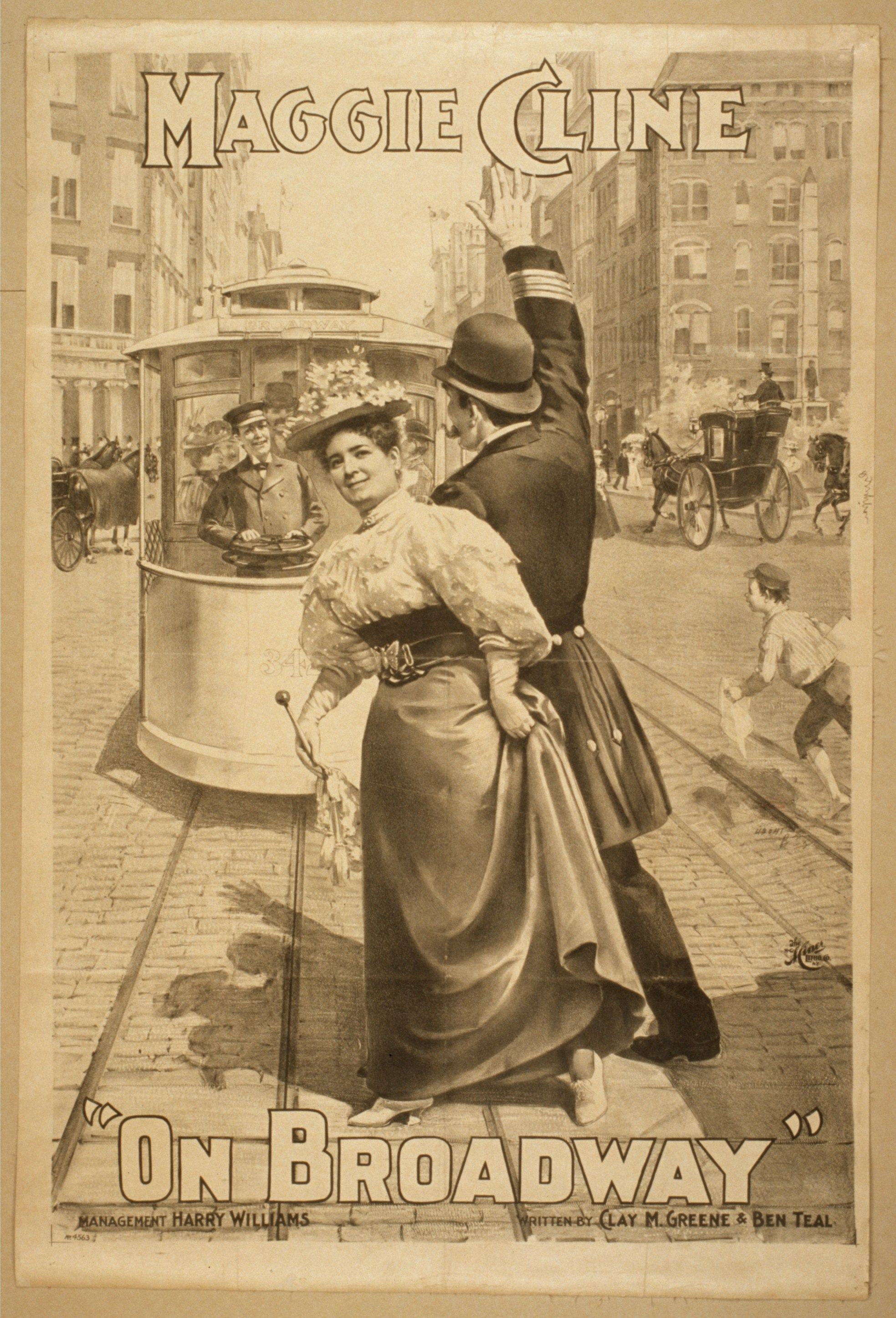
1898 poster for On Broadway

- Pico; or, The legend of Castle Molfi, a fairy pantomime (1883, later retitled Fantasma)
- Le Voyage en Suisse (1883, Greene crafted the revised libretto of this work)
- Sybil (1886, libretto by Greene; music by John F. Mitchell)
- Hans the Boatman, musical (1887, book and lyrics by Greene, music by various composers)
- Our Jennie, musical (1887; music by Barney Fagan; libretto by Greene)
- Blue Beard, Jr., a musical in four acts (1889, libretto by Greene; music by Fred J. Eustis, Richard Maddern, and John Joseph Braham Sr.)
- Peti, the Vagabond, musical (1890, libretto by Greene)
- The Maid of Plymouth, comic opera in two acts (1893, libretto by Greene; music by Thomas Pearsall Thorne)
- Africa, musical (1893; music by Randolph Cruger; libretto co-authored by Greene and J. Cheever Goodwin)
- The Little Trooper, operetta (1894, also known as Little Miss Trooper; Greene wrote a new English language libretto to Victor Roger's 1892 operetta Les 28 jours de Clairette; new music by William Furst)
- On Broadway, play with music (1896)
- April Fool, pasticcio (1897; libretto by Greene)
- A Musical Discord, pasticcio (1897; libretto by Greene)
- In Gay Paree, musical (1899, book by Greene; music by Ludwig Englander; lyrics by Grant Stewart)
- Sharp Becky, burlesque (1899, adapted into a portion of the burlesque musical Around New York in 80 Minutes)
- The Conspirators, comic opera (1899, libretto by Greene; music by Humphrey John Stewart)|
- The Remarkable Pipe Dream of Sherlock Holmes (1900, originally Lamb's Gambol; adapted into a portion of the burlesque musical Around New York in 80 Minutes)
- Aunt Hannah, musical (1900, lyrics by Greene; music by A. Baldwin Sloane; book by Matthew J. Royal)
- The Regatta Girl, musical (1900; libretto by Greene; music by Harry McLellan)
- The Silver Slipper, musical (1902 revised libretto by Greene; music by Leslie Stuart)
- John of Nepomuk: Patron Saint of Bohemia (1921, book and lyrics by Greene; music by composer Humphrey J. Stewart)
