= Lake El Estero =

Lake in Monterey, California

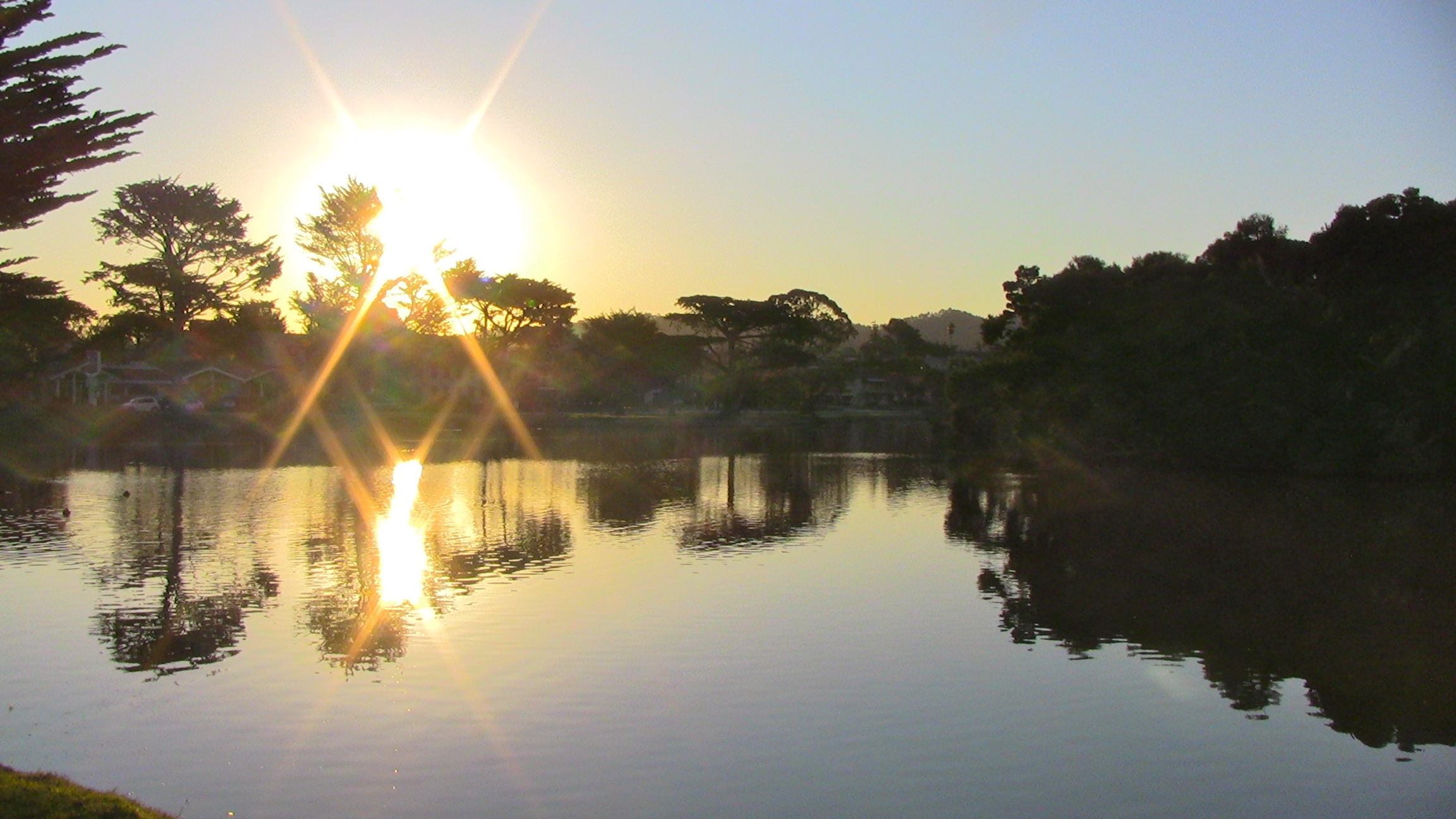
- Sunrise over Lake El Estero - December 4, 2011

- Location within California Location within the United States
- Location: Monterey, California
- Coordinates: 36°35′42″N 121°53′07″W
- Operator: City of Monterey
- Website: El Estero Park Complex

Lake El Estero (Spanish: the estuary) is a U-shaped body of water that is the anchor of the El Estero city park in Monterey, California. It is close to Del Monte Beach and Monterey Bay (and the Pacific Ocean). Two bridges connect downtown Monterey with the Oak Grove residential neighborhood and the Naval Postgraduate School. The 24.7-acre (100,000 m^{2}) El Estero park complex has dedicated spaces for recreation with a baseball field, skatepark, and the Dennis the Menace Playground. It is also popular with migrating birds and bird watchers.

== History ==
When El Estero was first discovered it was a lagoon filled with brackish water. Three major streams flowed into the lagoon. One stream went south to where San Carlos Cathedral currently is. The second went to the location of the county's courthouse. The final stream followed (today's) Del Monte Boulevard and flowed into the bay. In 1770 the first map of Lake El Estero was made by Miguel Costanso, a Spanish officer and engineer in the first expedition to California. The lagoon flooded constantly and in 1846 Walter Colton, a chaplain for the U.S. Navy, found a solution to the flooding problems. In his diary he wrote that “…it would be a good scheme to cut a channel between the two (the lagoon and the Bay)”.

In April 1874 the Monterey and Salinas Valley Railroad was built which permanently cut off the stream connecting El Estero to the Bay. This halted flooding and turned the lagoon into the freshwater lake that we know today.

From 1930 to 1931 efforts were made in turning the lake into an aquatic park. This was called the El Estero Development Project that was led by the City of Monterey. Eighty thousand cubic yards of mud were moved in its development.

El Estero has been a popular resting spot for migrating birds and in 1933 the bird refuge was named after Harry Ashland Greene, who had a great impact in its development.

Between 1938 and 1951 vast improvements were done to the park including “drudging and shoreline plantings and “two bridges connecting Pearl with third street." These new bridges connected downtown with the Oak Grove District.

In 1984 the lake was drained in order to remove 6,000 truckloads of silt, which was clogging drains. People were also worried that there may be bacteria and bird droppings in the mud. Storm drains were rerouted so silt and mud would be dumped into smaller ponds to be removed more easily.

== An ecosystem ==
Lake El Estero is an ecosystem that supports large amounts of life and is home to a countless number of birds, fish, and plants. Over 300 species of birds live in Lake El Estero Park. Many birds migrating south stop at the lake to rest such as the ring-billed gull, the western gull, the California gull, the mud hen, the black-crowned night heron, and the great blue heron. During the summer the brown pelican comes in from the south. Many ducks live there year-round such as the mallard. Many others find a home in Lake El Estero such as the ruddy duck, bufflehead duck, and Canada goose. Feeding the birds has been prohibited and they rely on local vegetation.

Many other animals live in the waters of Lake El Estero, including the western pond turtle, Pacific tree frog, red-legged frog, crayfish, and several varieties of fish such as the tule perch, Sacramento perch, and Sacramento blackfish.

There is a large amount of vegetation in Lake El Estero important to the many organisms that live there. The California Tule of California Bulrush provides a good nesting site for birds and its stems make a refuge for fish. Other commonly seen plants and trees are the Monterey cypress, the Monterey pine, the cattail, the coast live oak, the arroyo willow, and the yellow willow.

The lake is stocked regularly by the California Department of Fish and Wildlife with trout. A fishing license is needed to lawfully fish.

== Facilities ==
The El Estero Park has playgrounds, playfields, a skatepark, and boats used by both tourists and locals.

=== Dennis the Menace Playground ===
"We want to give them something that will bring out their creative instincts. It was designed for small children. It will include a treehouse, a free-floating raft, a maze, a drinking fountain in the form of a lion's head, weird-looking devices to stir a child's imagination."

— Hank Ketcham

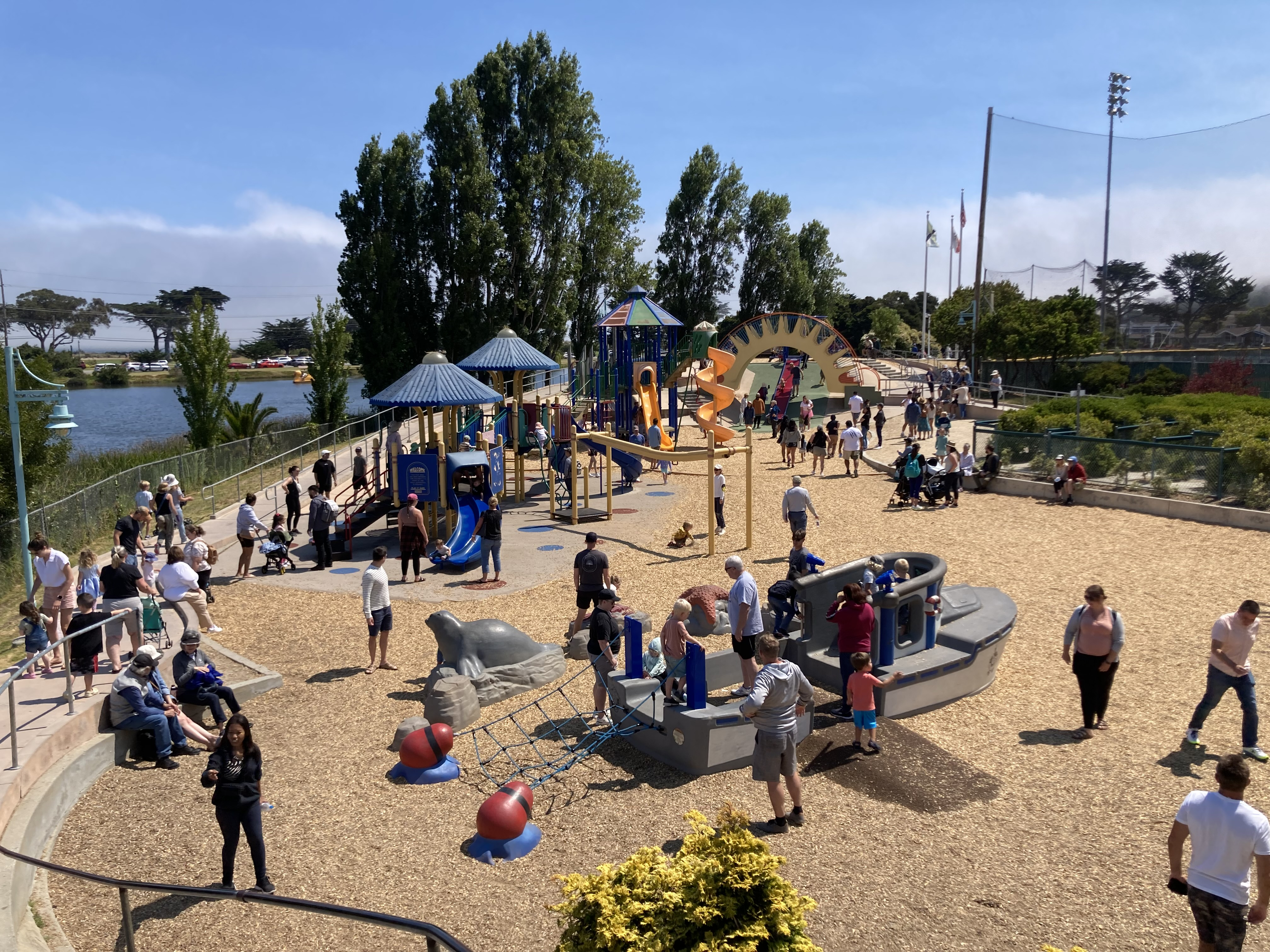
Dennis the Menace playground showing play structures, a hedge maze, and Lake El Estero in the background

The Dennis the Menace Playground was designed by cartoon writer Hank Ketcham and with the help of sculptor Arch Garner. In May 1954, a model for the design was approved by the Monterey planning commission. The playground opened on November 17, 1956, with a variety of children's play areas including a 1924 locomotive steam engine, donated by the Southern Pacific Railroad In 1986 a renovation of the park was done, led by landscape architect Richard Murray and cost at least $300,000. In this renovation a 30-ft tall rope swing was added along with other new playground equipment. In 2017, there were additional renovations and additional rides to meet ADA concerns.

==== Southern Pacific Locomotive Steam Engine Access ====
The city worked with Fort Ord, former United States Army post, to move the steam engine to the park in January 1956. In 2013, due to liability concerns, a fence was placed around the steam train engine and lion's head drinking fountain. Previously kids were allowed to climb the train freely. There are repeated efforts to open up the access to the train as a play structure.

==== Missing Statue ====
A life-sized 3.5 foot tall, 200 pound bronze statue of cartoon strip character Dennis the Menace is displayed at the entrance to the Dennis the Menace Playground. In recent years it has been stolen twice. In 1988 Ketcham commissioned Academy Award-winning animator and sculptor Wah Ming Chang to make the original statue. In 2006 the statue of Dennis the Menace was first stolen. The bronze statue was only bolted down, and it is speculated that it might have been melted and sold. A replacement statue was given to the park in March 2007 and cemented in place. It was donated by Willis W. and Ethel M. Clark Foundation, founders of the California Test Bureau, now known as CTB McGraw Hill. In 2015 the original lost statue was thought to have been found in a scrap yard in Florida. It was then returned to Monterey. It was a duplicate statue, given to the Arnold Palmer Hospital for Children in Orlando, FL but misplaced after a remodel. The duplicate statue stayed in Monterey and was installed in front of the city recreation office. In August 2022, the replacement statue at the Dennis the Menace playground was stolen again. A grinder was used to cut the foot of the statue. It was found 6 months later by Monterey Police in a canal near Roberts Lake in Seaside.

==== Current Play Structures ====
- large slides
- climbing wall
- suspension bridge
- hedge maze with a play structure in the center
- giant adventure ship
- 1924 Southern Pacific steam engine

==== Retired Play Structures ====
- metal slide
- giant swing (Spinny-Thing-of-Death)

=== Other Attractions ===
The El Estero Ball Park is used by the Junior League, the Women's Soccer League, and other sport clubs. There is also a dog park and a skatepark, designed by 40 local skaters.

El Estero Boating has fiberglass paddleboats for rent to tour the lake for half hour or hour rides. There are regular style boats or large white swan boats. The boats carry up to 4-5 people.

== See also ==
- List of lakes in California
