= Aunt Hannah =

1900 American musical

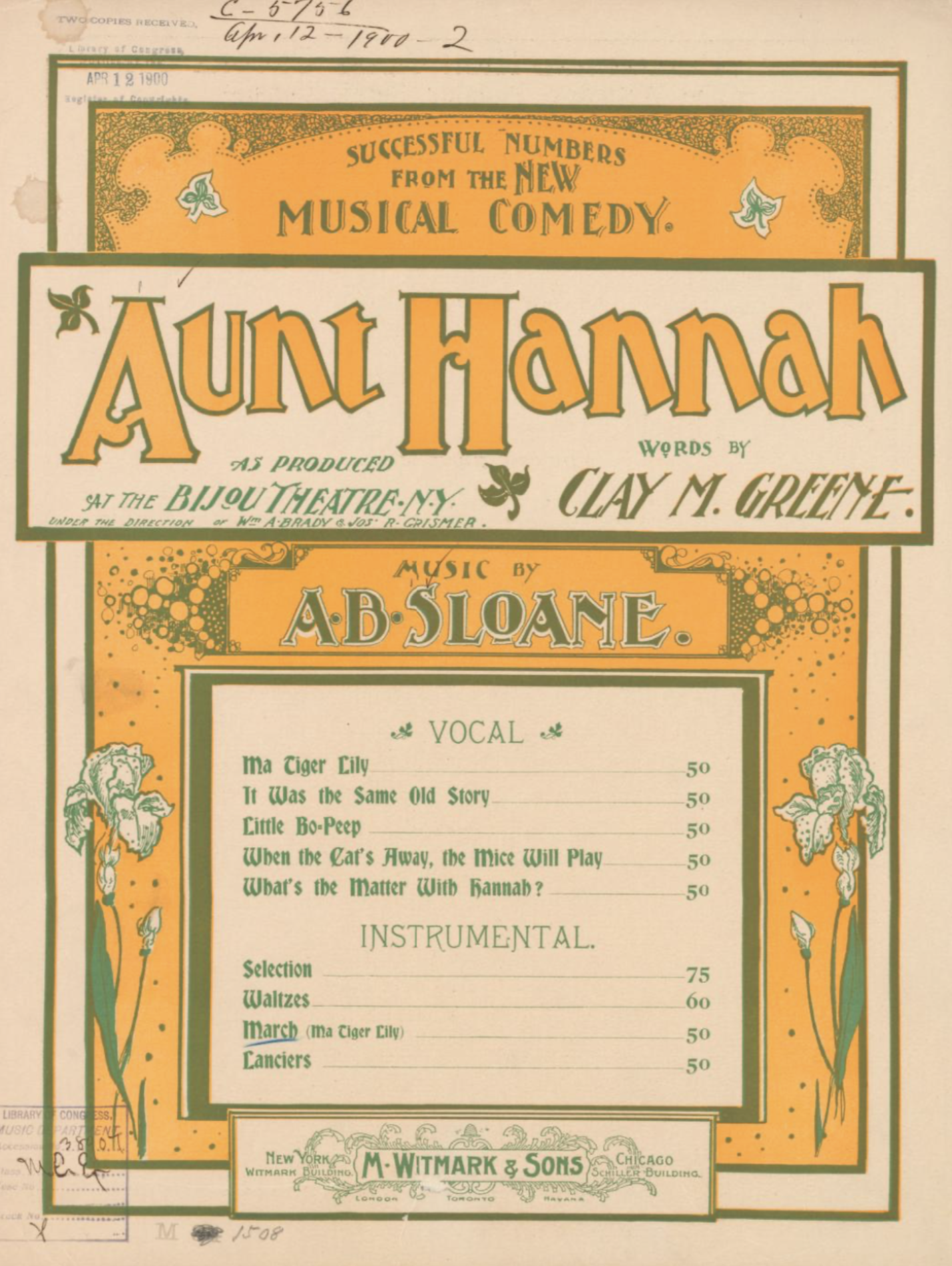
Front cover of sheet music for Aunt Hannah.

Aunt Hannah is a musical in three acts with music by A. Baldwin Sloane, lyrics by Clay M. Greene, and a book by Matthew J. Royal. The musical premiered on Broadway at the Bijou Theatre where it opened on February 22, 1900. It ran there for 21 performances, closing on March 10, 1900. Actress Agnes Findlay led the cast as Aunt Hannah with Frederick Hallen as Jack Hammersley, Bobby Gaylor as Mike McCarty, Charles W. Butler as Grimes, Bud Ross as Jim Madden, Belle Bucklin as Martha, Louise Lehman as Nora, Louise Hilton as Mary, Molly Fuller as Polly Madden, John Bunny as Grosvenor Montmorenci, and Caro Gordon Leigh as Evelyn.

The musical had success with the songs "My Tiger Lily" and "When the Cat's Away the Mice Will Play"; the first becoming a briefly popular commercial hit and the second serving as a "show stopper" within the musical. The New York Times review praised both of these songs; particularly noting that "My Tiger Lily" had "saved the show" from being a failure.

== Plot ==
Aunt Hannah, a wealthy but religious and conservative woman, departs on a trip and leaves her mansion in the care of her nephew, Jack. To the chagrin of Hannah's servants, Jack decides to throw a wild party in his aunt's house while she is away. Everything is going off with a rip-roaring fun time, until Aunt Hannah unexpectedly returns home from her trip early. Jack must use his wits to deceive his aunt to avoid trouble. Co-opting an old beau of Hannah's into his plan, he manages to smooth things over and all ends well.
