= Matthew J. Royal =

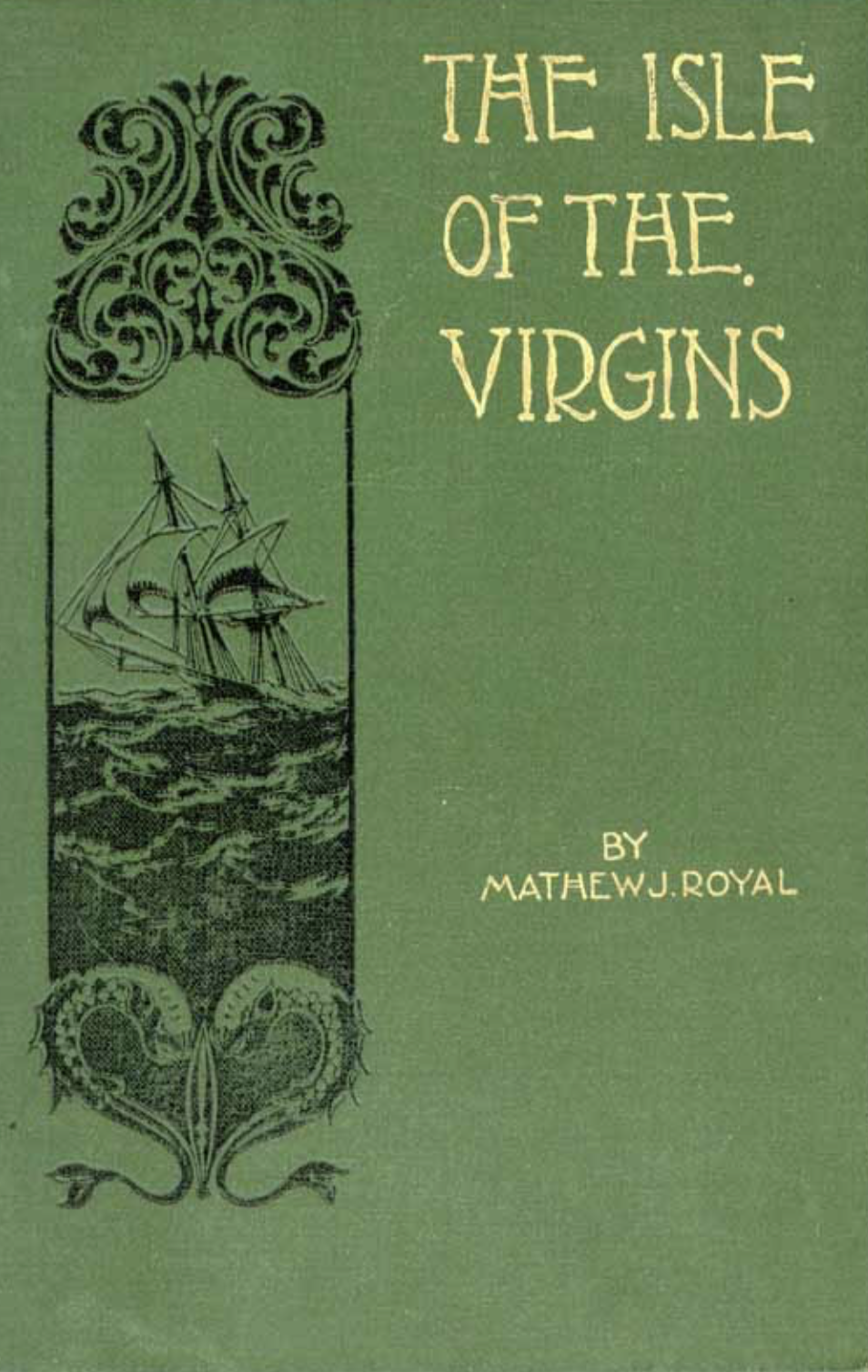
Front cover of The Isle of the Virgins (1899)

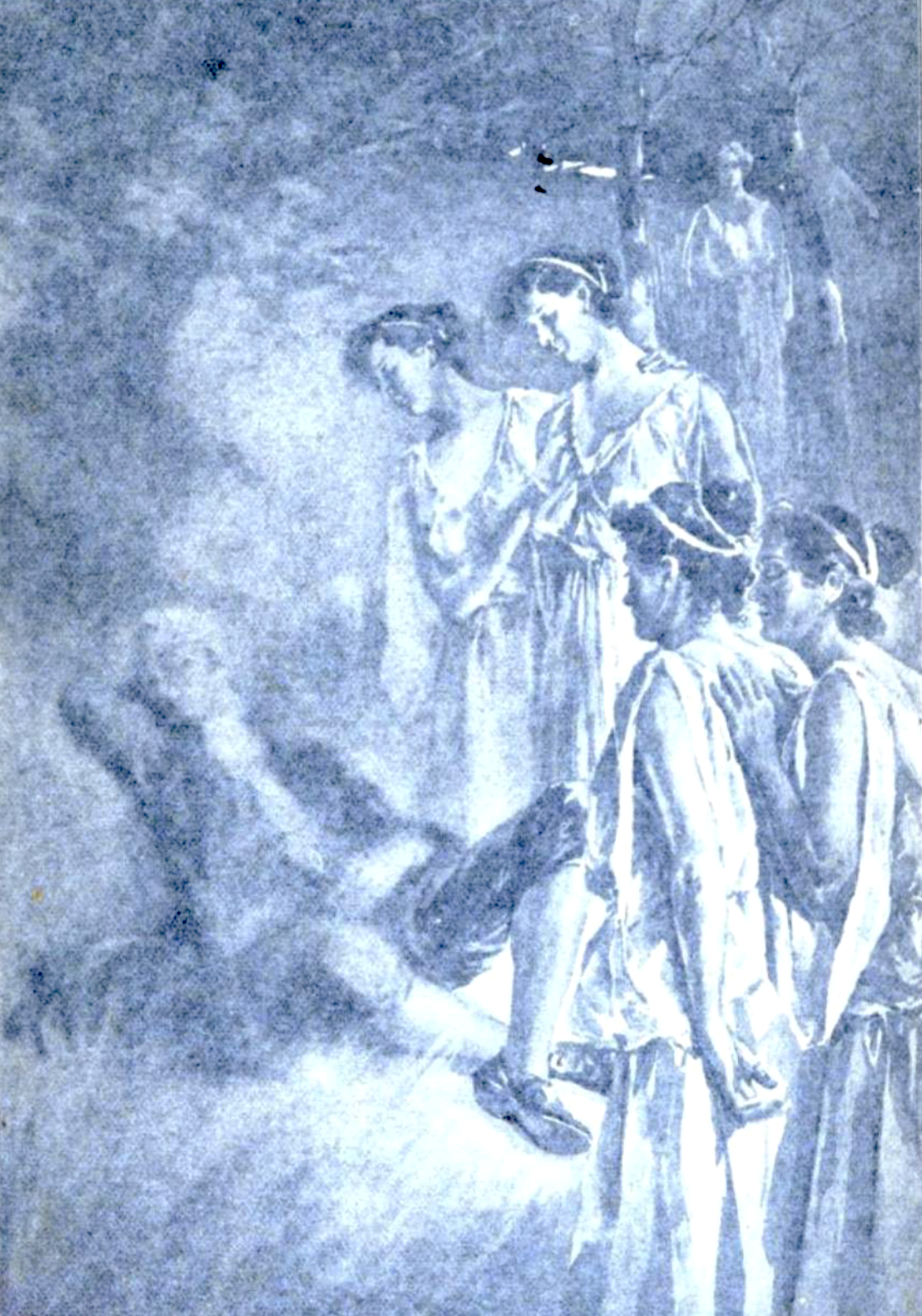
Artwork on page 1 of The Isle of the Virgins (1899)

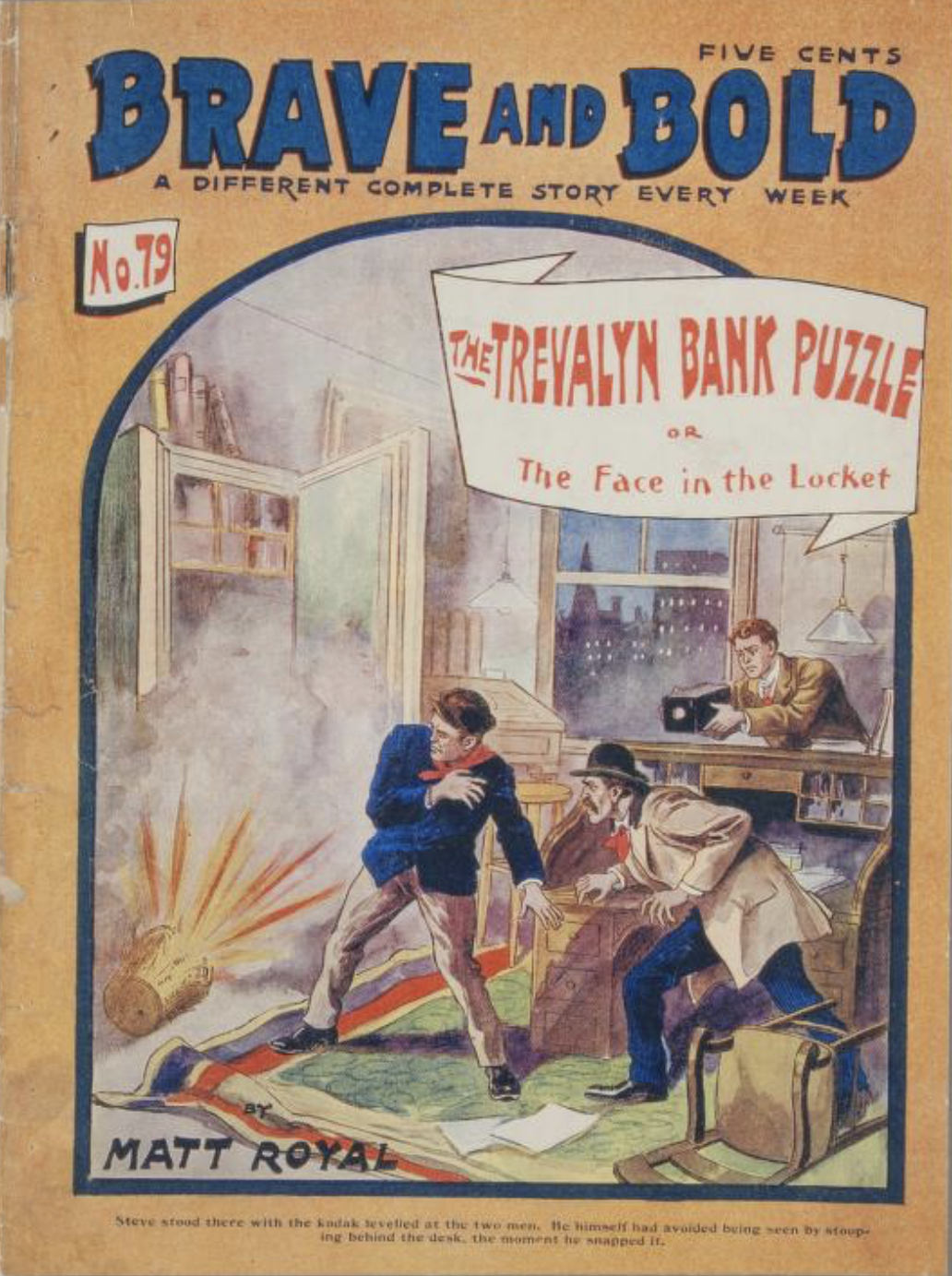
The Trevalyn Bank Puzzle by Matt Royal

Matthew J. Royal, also known as Matt Royal, (27 May 1863 – 14 November 1900) was a Canadian novelist, playwright, and teacher. Best known for his novel The Isle of the Virgins: A Romance (1899), Royal also wrote the books to the musicals A Social Lion and Aunt Hannah. The latter work was staged on Broadway in 1900, the year of his death at the age of 37. Under the name Matt Royal he wrote several dime novels which were published posthumously in Street & Smith's Brave and Bold Weekly.

== Life and career ==
Matthew Joseph Royal was born in Adelaide, Ontario on 27 May 1863. He worked as a teacher in Canada while simultaneously pursuing a career as a writer. His novel The Isle of the Virgins: A Romance was published in 1899 by the Wenborne-Sumner Company. The novel was about a group of male sailors who discover an island inhabited by a matriarchal society in which men are enslaved to the women who hold power. In its review of the novel, The Bookseller magazine compared Royal's writing style to that of Jules Verne but with a more adult audience oriented focus. The novel was later republished in 1905 by Street & Smith under the name The Unknown Island; Or, The Isle of the Virgins.

In 1895 Daniel Sully's theatre company toured the United States in a production of a musical comedy with a book by Royal entitled A Social Lion. It starred the comedian Dan Mason, the actress Kate Michelena, and operatic tenor John C. Haven. He also wrote the book to the musical Aunt Hannah which used music by A. Baldwin Sloane and lyrics by Clay M. Greene. It was staged on Broadway at the Bijou Theatre in 1900. The New York Times critic felt that the plot of the farce crafted by Royal was somewhat derivative; likening it to Arthur Sturgess and Edgar Smith's Hotel Topsy Turvy.

Using the name Matt Royal, the author wrote several dime novels which were published posthumously in Street & Smith's Brave and Bold Weekly. These included Tom Hamlin, Mesmerist; or, The Boy With the Iron Will (1903), Saved from the Gallows; or, The Rescue of Charlie Armitage (1904), The Trevalyn Bank Puzzle; or, The Face in the Locket (1904), and In Russia’s Power; or, How Two Boys Outwitted the Czar.

Royal died in Thorold, Ontario on 14 November 1900.
