= Blue Beard, Jr. =

1889 musical in four acts

Bluebeard, Jr., or, Fatima and the Fairy is a musical in four acts with a libretto by Clay M. Greene and music by Fred J. Eustis, Richard Maddern, and John Joseph Braham Sr. The plot is loosely based on the folk tale of Bluebeard as told by Charles Perrault. The work was a critical triumph when its premiered at the Grand Opera House, Chicago on June 11, 1889; especially for the elaborate and innovative sets designed by Ernest Albert, and for the performance of its star, the comedian Eddie Foy. The original cast also included Josie Hall in the trouser role of Abdallah. After its Chicago premiere, the production toured nationally; including stops at Boston's Tremont Theatre (1889) and Broadway's Niblo's Garden (1890).
