= John Joseph Braham Sr. =

American conductor and composer (1847–1919)

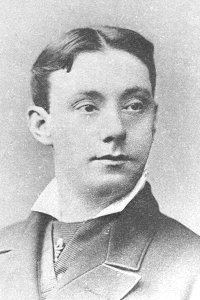
Braham as a young violinist

John Joseph Braham (1847 – October 28, 1919) was an English-born American musical theater conductor and composer who introduced the works of Gilbert and Sullivan to the United States and composed some of the earliest original orchestral scores for silent film.

Braham emigrated from England to America as a child. As a teenager, he toured as a violinist. After this he became a conductor and music director at New York and Boston theatres. In 1879, he conducted the first American production of a Savoy opera, H.M.S. Pinafore and became associated with Gilbert and Sullivan works for the next decade. He also conducted a number of other musical theatre works and at music halls. In 1913 and 1914, he composed musical scores for silent films, including In the Land of the Head Hunters.

== Biography ==
=== Early years and Gilbert and Sullivan ===
Braham was born in 1847 in England to musician Joseph Braham (1827–1877). The Brahams emigrated from England in the 1850s. His brothers were William, Albert and Harry, and his uncle (not his brother) was David Braham, composer for Harrigan & Hart.

In 1862, at the age of 14, Braham began earning his living as a violinist in New York vaudeville and music hall houses and theaters. His father served as the music director for Tony Pastor's Opera House on the Bowery, where Braham may have played in the orchestra. After touring for a few years as a violin virtuoso, Braham accepted the post of musical director of Pike's Opera House and subsequently at other New York theatres. During the 1870s he worked as a musical director and conductor in Boston, Massachusetts (Adelphi Theatre, Howard Athenaeum, Boston Museum Orchestra), as well as at surrounding summer resorts. He composed popular songs in many genres, the earliest known copyright in 1871. In the 1870s, he also began to compose scores for the musical stage. For example, in 1876, The Era reported that his comic opera Evangeline pleased Boston audiences with its catchy melodies.

Braham introduced America to the works of Gilbert and Sullivan. He conducted the first performances of H.M.S. Pinafore in America, opening on November 26, 1879, at the Boston Museum, a production that was not authorized by Gilbert and Sullivan. From 1882 to 1883, he directed an authorized production of Iolanthe at the newly opened Bijou Theatre in Boston with a cast that featured principals from the D'Oyly Carte Opera Company. Other Gilbert and Sullivan productions included D'Oyly Carte tours in New England of The Mikado and Ruddigore in 1885–86 and 1887. He also conducted a revival of Patience in Boston, again with several members of the D'Oyly Carte company in the principal cast and the first Boston productions of The Yeomen of the Guard (in 1889) and The Gondoliers (in 1890). In 1894, he directed D'Oyly Carte's original American productions of Utopia, Limited in New York and then Boston. For his American productions of the Savoy operas, Braham made "judicious changes" in the scores.

=== New York and later years ===
By the 1880s, Braham began dividing his time between Boston and New York City, first at Wallack's Theatre and, in the middle of the decade, became music director of the Casino Theatre at Broadway and 39th Street. He married Sophia Broschart in Boston in 1891, and the couple's children were John J. Braham Jr. and Marjorie Sophia Braham. He is listed in 1899 in The New York Times as director at Koster and Bial's Music Hall but was also engaged on occasion at the Casino Theatre's roof top garden. He worked on the following shows, among others:

- 1880. Hiawatha (Standard Theatre; co-composer with Edward E. Rice)
- 1887. The Corsair (Bijou Opera House; co-composer with Edward E. Rice)
- 1889. The Seven Ages (musical director)
- 1889 Blue Beard, Jr. (composer along with Fred J. Eustis and Richard Maddern). It premiered at Grand Opera House, Chicago, on June 11, 1889, and toured to Niblo's Garden in 1890.
- 1899. An Arabian Girl and 40 Thieves (director and co-composer)
- 1899. Around New York in 80 Minutes (co-composer with Edward E. Rice)
- 1900. San Toy, or the Emperor's Own (musical director)
- 1906. Matilda (musical director)

In 1913, Braham composed music for the silent film of a pageant by F. E. Moore called Hiawatha: the Indian Passion Play, based on Henry Wadsworth Longfellow's poem The Song of Hiawatha. Around the same time, Edward S. Curtis commissioned Braham to compose a score for In the Land of the Head Hunters. This 1914 film fictionalized the world of the Kwakwaka'wakw (Kwakiutl) peoples of the Queen Charlotte Strait region of the Central Coast of British Columbia, Canada, and was written and directed by Curtis and acted entirely by Kwakwaka'wakw natives. Braham's score was performed with full orchestra, at the premiere of In the Land of the Head Hunters, at the Casino Theatre in New York, probably its only live performance.

Braham died in Brooklyn, New York, on October 28, 1919 at the age of 72.

== Legacy ==
Curtis's film and Braham's score were restored and shown at the Getty Center in Los Angeles, California on June 5, 2008.
