= Fred J. Eustis =

American composer, conductor and theatre director

Frederick J. Eustis, sometime referred to as F. J. Eustis, (c. 1858, in Boston, Massachusetts – March 28, 1912, in Toronto, Canada) was an American composer, conductor, and theatre director. He is best remembered for writing music for several Broadway musicals.

== Career ==
Eustis first drew attention as a theatre composer with the 1879 musical Sancho Pedro, with a book by Charles Felton Pidgin, staged at the Gaiety Theatre on Broadway in 1879. This was followed by the musical Penny Ante; or The Last of the Fairies, with a book and lyrics by Jeff S. Leerburger and premiered at Broadway's Fourteenth Street Theatre on June 9, 1884, It featured the actor Charles H. Drew performing the title heroine in drag. He wrote music for the 1890 musical Blue Beard, Jr. which was a tremendous success when it premiered at the Grand Opera House, Chicago; ultimately touring to Broadway's Niblo's Garden.

Eustis composed music for two Broadway musicals based on classic fairy tales: Mother Goose (Fourteenth Street Theatre, 1899) and Little Red Riding Hood (Boston Museum, 1899; and Casino Theatre, 1900). He also directed the musical The Ameer, which was staged at Wallack's Theatre in 1899–1900, and served as the music director for the Broadway musicals Miss Simplicity (1902) and The Tenderfoot (1904).

Eustis died at the age of 53 on March 28, 1912, in Toronto, Canada.

== Bibliography ==
- Gerald Martin Bordman, Richard Norton (2010). American Musical Theatre: A Chronicle. Oxford University Press. ISBN 9780199729708.
- Dan Dietz (2021). The Complete Book of 1910s Broadway Musicals. Rowman & Littlefield Publishers. ISBN 9781538150283.
- John Franceschina (2018). Incidental and Dance Music in the American Theatre from 1786 to 1923, Volume 1. BearManor Media.
- Gänzl, Kurt (1994). The Encyclopedia of the Musical Theatre, Volume 2. Schirmer Books. ISBN 9780028714455.
