= Grand Opera House (Chicago) =

Coordinates: 41.8842°N 87.6304°W

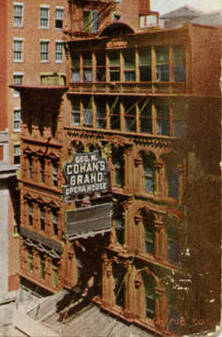
- Grand Opera House in the early 20th century
- Interactive map of Grand Opera House

Construction
- Opened: 1875
- Closed: 1958
- Demolished: 1962

The Grand Opera House was a theatre located at 119 North Clark Street in Chicago, Illinois.

Established by Chicago impresario John A. Hamlin, the theatre originally opened as the Coliseum in 1875 and was later rebranded as Hamlin's Theatre in 1878. The theatre was remodeled by architect Dankmar Adler. It reopened in 1880 as the Grand Opera House; now under the management of Harry L. Hamlin who ran the theatre for the next 32 years under that name. Under his tenure the venue became a respectable theatre which featured mainly performances of light operas and musical comedies; although some plays were also performed. In 1888 the well known painter and scenic designer Ernest Albert re-designed the interior of the opera house.

In 1912 the theatre was renamed George M. Cohan's Grand Opera House when George M. Cohan and Sam H. Harris took over the lease of the theatre. They operated the theatre into the early 1920s. The theatre then went through another extensive remodel and construction under architect Andrew Rebori before re-opening as the Four Cohans Theatre in 1926; now under co-ownership by Cohan and the Shubert family. In 1928 the Shubert family became the sole owners of the theatre, and it was once again named the Grand Opera House. It continued under this name into the early 1940s.

The theatre was purchased by RKO Pictures and remodeled and reconstructed again; this time with the purpose of changing the theatre into a movie palace to showcase RKO's films. It reopened as the RKO Grand Theatre in 1942. The theatre closed in March 1958 and was later demolished in May 1962 to make way for the construction of the Richard J. Daley Center which is situated on the same property.

== Notable premieres ==
- Hearts of Oak (1879)
- Blue Beard, Jr. (1889)
- Arizona (1899)
- The Wizard of Oz (1902)
- Babes in Toyland (1903)
- Yes, Yes, Yvette (1926)
