= The House of Discord =

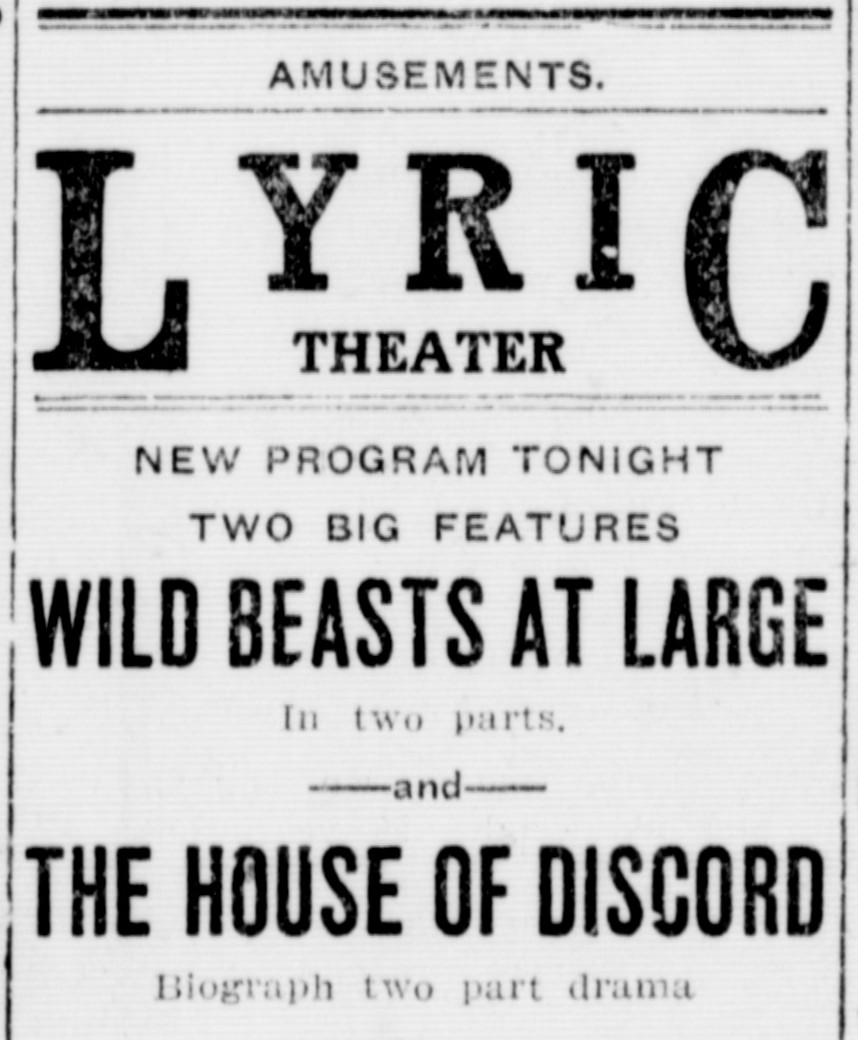
- Contemporary advertisement
- Directed by: James Kirkwood Sr.
- Written by: A. Clayton Harris; F. E. Woods; William C. deMille (play)
- Produced by: Marc Klaw; Abraham Erlanger
- Starring: Blanche Sweet; Lionel Barrymore; Dorothy Gish
- Cinematography: William T. Crespinel
- Distributed by: Biograph Company; General Film Company
- Release date: December 13, 1913
- Running time: 20 minutes (2 reels)
- Country: United States
- Languages: Silent film English intertitles

The House of Discord (1913) is a silent American drama film directed by James Kirkwood Sr., written by F. E. Woods and A. Clayton Harris from the play by William C. deMille. The film stars Lionel Barrymore and marked the theatrical film debut of actor Jack Mulhall.

== Plot ==
A mother attempts to save her daughter from making a social mistake after she finds it similar to one she had once faced herself.

== Cast ==
- Marshall Neilan as The Wife
- Blanche Sweet as The Husband
- Jack Mulhall as The Wife's Sweetheart
- Dorothy Gish as The Daughter
- Lionel Barrymore as The Daughter's Sweetheart
- James Kirkwood, Sr. as The Sister-in-Law
- Antonio Moreno as The Sister-in-Law's Sweetheart

== Production ==
The House of Discord was directed by James Kirkwood, Sr. The film stars Lionel Barrymore. In addition to Barrymore, it also stars Blanche Sweet, Dorothy Gish, Marshall Neilan, Antonio Moreno, and Jack Mulhall. This was Mulhall's first theatrical film role; he portrayed a juvenile character which the titular discord centered on. The film was produced by Klaw & Erlanger and Biograph Company.

The screenplay was written by F. E. Woods from a play by William C. deMille, and was produced by Marc Klaw and Abraham Erlanger. The film is a silent two-reeler. Cinematographer Tony Gaudio was nearly fired during production after he attempted to reproduce the glow cast from a fireplace, rather than employing the fixed, flat lighting that was accepted practice at the time.

== Release ==
The film was released theatrically on December 13, 1913 by the General Film Company. A reviewer for The Moving Picture World wrote that it "will be readily appreciated by women" and that it is a "woman's story" which "reaches its most effective emotional passages in showing the influence of a mother over a daughter who is on the verge of making a serious mistake."

== Preservation status ==
The House of Discord is now in the public domain. A print of the film survives at the Museum of Modern Art in New York City.
