= Klaw and Erlanger =

American entertainment management and production partnership (1888–1919)

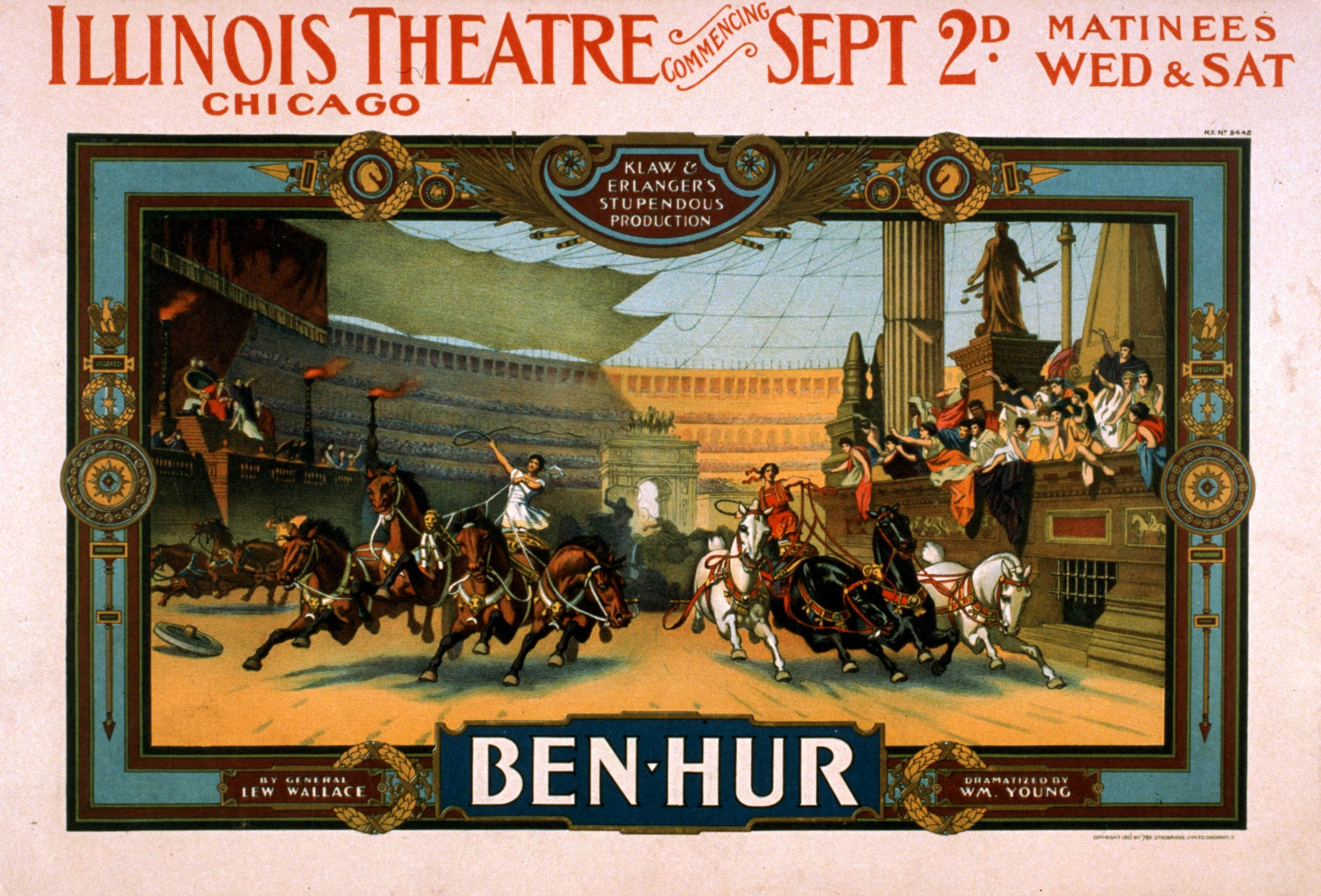
the partnership's 1901 production of Ben Hur, Chicago

Klaw and Erlanger was an entertainment management and production partnership of Marc Klaw and Abraham Lincoln Erlanger based in New York City from 1888 through 1919. While running their own considerable and multi-faceted theatrical businesses on Broadway, they were key figures in the Theatrical Syndicate, the lucrative booking monopoly for first-class legitimate theaters nationwide.

Klaw and Erlanger joined in partnership in 1888. Starting from the purchase of an existing booking agency, the partners gradually gained control of the southern territory, anchored in New Orleans. They ran allied businesses, produced Broadway shows, and owned a number of theaters. They were part owners of the new Iroquois Theater in Chicago, which suffered a catastrophic fire in 1903 that resulted in more than 600 deaths and brought Klaw & Erlanger bitter criticism. In the same year they opened their flagship New Amsterdam Theater in New York, where the Aerial Gardens became the longtime stage for the Ziegfeld Follies.

From 1896, Klaw and Erlanger joined with others to form the Theatrical Syndicate which held an effective monopoly over the booking of stage performers into first-class legitimate theaters across the United States. Its control of the theater market was brief. As the Syndicate attempted to bring vaudeville from its "lowbrow associations by presenting only the finest, class acts", pressure from the independent Shubert family and accusations of trust building forced the Syndicate to lose much of its market power in 1910. After 1910, Klaw and Erlanger continued to play a role in the syndicate, which still sparred with the Shuberts for market share for years. Klaw and Erlanger also ran their own productions, experimented with vaudeville, and embarked on film production from 1913 to 1916. They dissolved their partnership in 1919, remaining independently active afterward.

== The partners ==
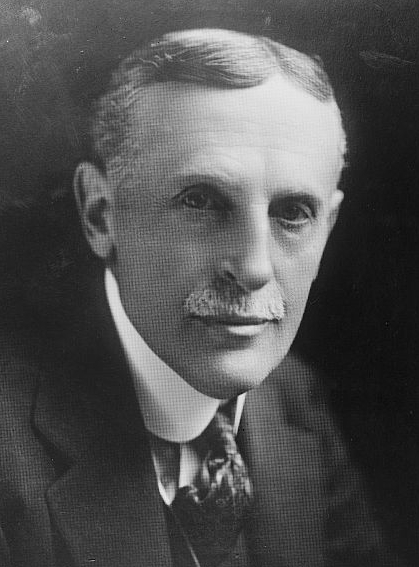
Marc Klaw

All the members of the Theatrical Syndicate brought in geographic territories, sections of a national, networked chain of theaters in the United States. The strength of Klaw and Erlanger came from its dominance in the south.

Marc Klaw (1858-1936) was born in Paducah, Kentucky in 1858. He received his law degree from Louisville Law School and practiced law while maintaining a role within the theater industry as a part-time critic.

A. L. Erlanger (1860-1930) came from Cleveland, beginning as treasurer of the Euclid Avenue Opera House. In his 20s Erlanger worked for Joseph Jefferson and others as business manager for touring theater companies. He was known for his bullish personality.

After a meeting in San Antonio, in 1888 Klaw teamed with Erlanger to purchase the former H.S. Taylor Theatrical Exchange in New York. Through Klaw's personal contacts with theater owners, they expanded it to assert control over southern touring routes, but with operational control and a major theatrical presence in New York City. The partners also ran a number of allied subsidiary businesses, including the "Klaw and Erlanger Opera Company", "Klaw and Erlanger's Costume Company", and a construction company.

Erlanger throughout his career was known for underwriting shows such as The Great Metropolis (1889) and producing large numbers such as Pink Lady (1911) and Honeymoon Lane (1926). The partners produced the first Ziegfeld Follies in 1907 at the rooftop "Jardin de Paris" in New York City.

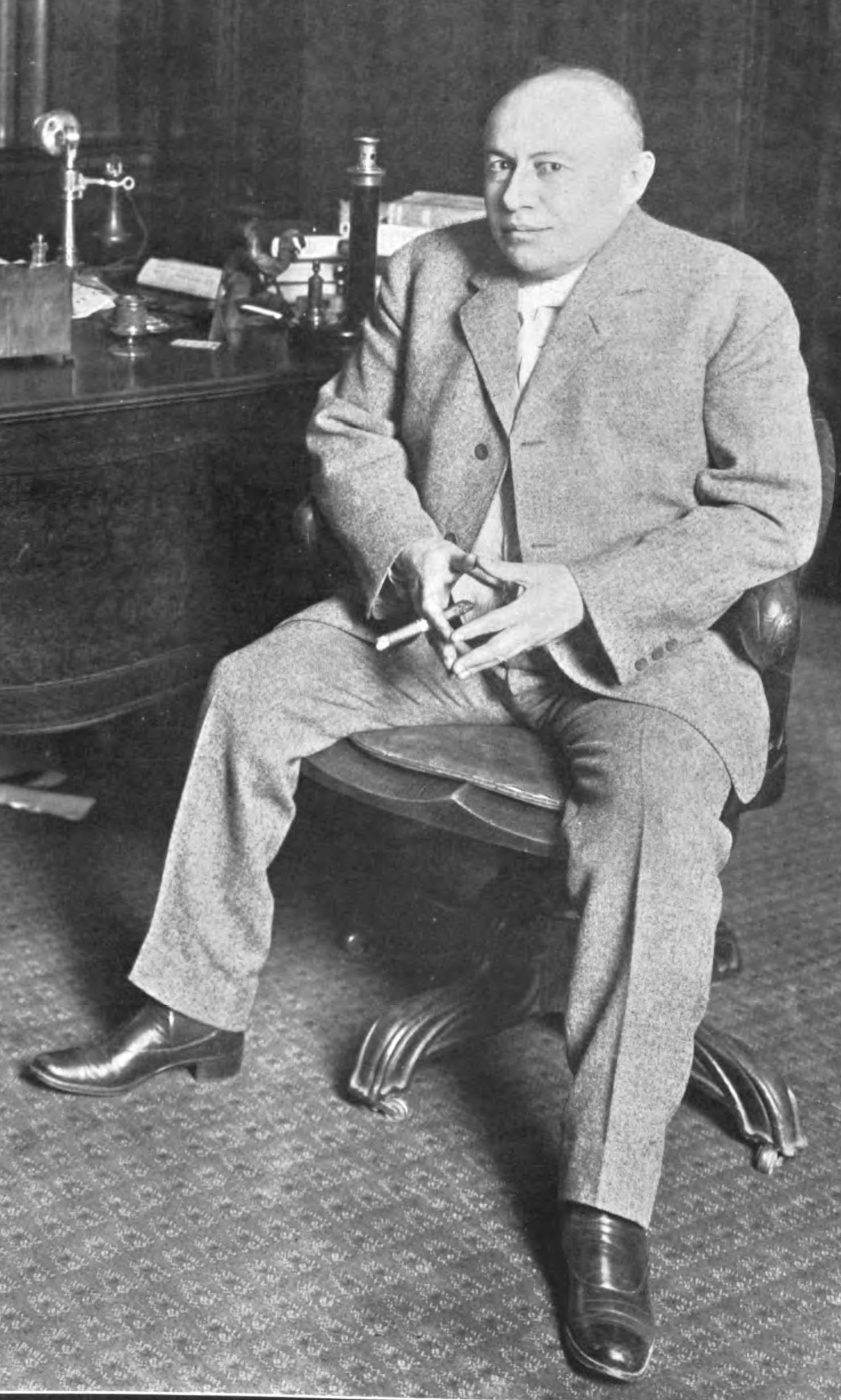
Abraham Lincoln Erlanger 1909

As partners Klaw & Erlanger remained involved—dominant—in the affairs of the Theatrical Syndicate after its peak.

== Theaters ==
Klaw and Erlanger's own operations encompassed running the Syndicate's booking operations for over 500 theaters across the country, regular Broadway productions, direct ownership of a number of houses in New York and New Orleans, and the occasional commissioning of entirely new theaters.

The most lavish of these was the flagship New Amsterdam Theatre, opened October 23, 1903. The architects were Herts & Tallant, working in a hard-to-classify fin-de-sciele style, with integrated sculpture and murals from artists the caliber of George Grey Barnard and Roland Hinton Perry. The New Amsterdam featured the largest playhouse on Broadway (1,702 seats), new office headquarters for the firm, and, in a prompt expansion upward a year later, creation of the Aerial Gardens rooftop theater with its notorious see-through staircase, home of the Ziegfeld Follies from 1913 through 1920. Designer and architect Joseph Urban became the scenic designer for the Follies shows at the New Amsterdam starting in 1915.

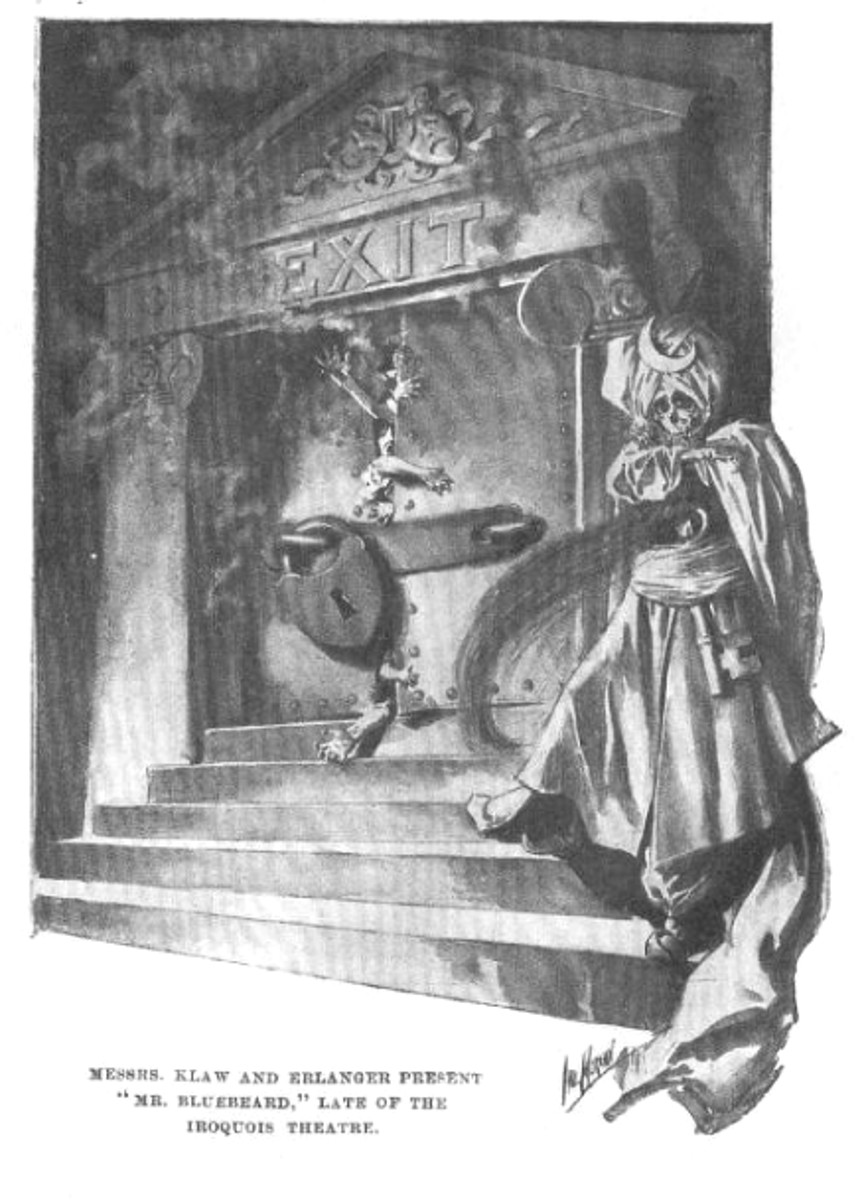
Life magazine cartoon, January 21, 1904, subject of libel case

The Iroquois Theater in Chicago opened weeks later, in November, after a rushed construction schedule. The new theater burned during a holiday matinee on December 30, 1903, with the loss of more than 600 lives, among the worst fires in American history. The Iroquois fire brought intense criticism to Klaw and Erlanger. The team retained the brilliant Chicago attorney Levy Mayer to defend against the resulting wave of criminal and civil litigation. Most prominent among its critics in the press was James Metcalfe, drama critic and editor of the old Life magazine, whose attacks on Klaw & Erlanger persisted for years and ranged into ugly anti-Semitic caricature. Metcalfe's "special vendetta against the syndicate" led to the January 1904 publication of a cartoon showing a skeleton, costumed as Bluebeard, guarding the padlocked door of a theater exit, with the caption "Messrs. Klaw and Erlanger Present Mr. Bluebeard, Late of the Iroquois Theater." For that, Klaw & Erlanger presented Life with its first libel suit, for $100,000 in damages. After considering that the partners had owned 25% of the Iroquois, managed its bookings, and had owned the production of "Mr. Bluebeard," the jury dismissed their libel suit after five minutes' deliberation.

Other KE theaters in New York included the Gaiety Theatre, the Liberty Theatre, and the New York Theatre. In New Orleans the partners owned and operated the Tulane and the Crescent.

== The Syndicate ==
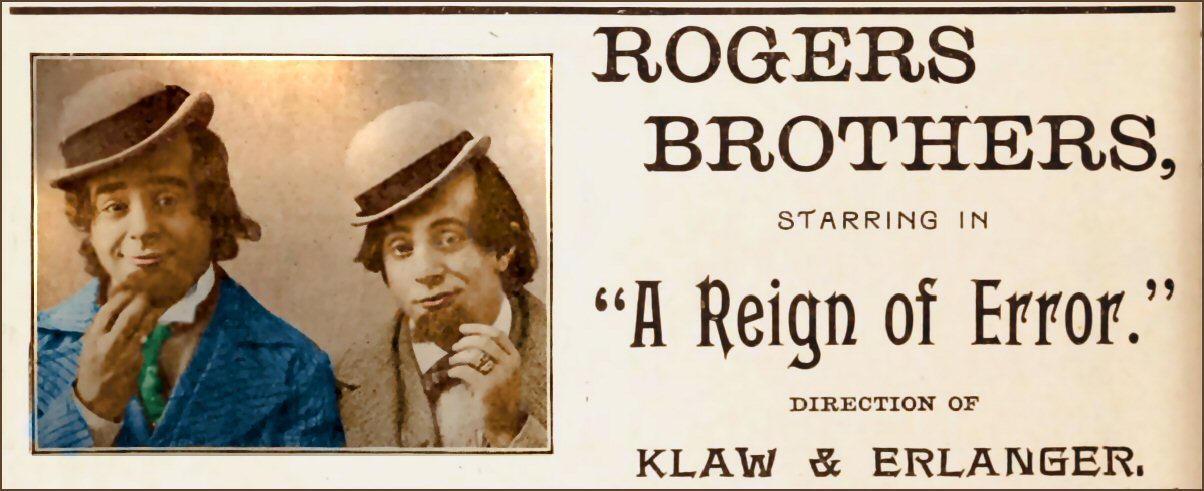
The Rogers Brothers in Klaw and Erlanger's "Reign of Error" 1898-99

The partners became founding parties to the Theatrical Syndicate in 1896. The other members were Charles Frohman, J. Fred Zimmerman Sr., Samuel F. Nixon and Al Hayman. Another loosely associated figure was William Harris of Rich & Harris in Boston. Taking advantage of their physical chain of theaters, the syndicate developed a standardized booking process, and brought efficiency to an otherwise fragmented and wasteful scheduling system.

The system was opposed—by their main competitors, the Shubert brothers. Sam Shubert began to compete through the billing of "independent theater," an appeal that soon broke the Syndicates' playhouse monopoly and began the diversification of Broadway theater. But the Klaw & Erlanger booking system was also decried and challenged by performers such as the prominent actor Richard Mansfield, the husband-and-wife team of Harrison Grey Fiske and Minnie Maddern Fiske, among many others.

Its monopoly was broken in 1910, but the Theatrical Syndicate continued in operation with considerable holdings. As late as October 1924—after the partners' brief foray into the film business circa 1915, after Marc Klaw ended his partnership with Erlanger in 1919 and opened his own Klaw Theatre on Broadway in 1921—A.L. Erlanger was still reported as the most powerful member of the Theatrical Syndicate. In fact, poised to take over the complete operation and its multifaceted benefits:

Mr. Erlanger, who was the most powerful member of the anti-unionists, has wearied of conducting the famous Theatrical Syndicate without assistance while dividing the profits with the heirs and assigns of the other original members; so, he has arranged the matter in such fashion that hereafter he, himself, will be all there is of the Syndicate... The combination took life in 1896...with a view of avoiding conflict and confusion, fixing responsibility for broken engagements and disregarded contracts, and incidentally of determining the drawing-power and consequent sharing-terms of plays and starts. The scheme, Mr. Erlanger long ago told me, originated not with him, but with the late Al Hayman...

A.L. Erlanger died in 1930.

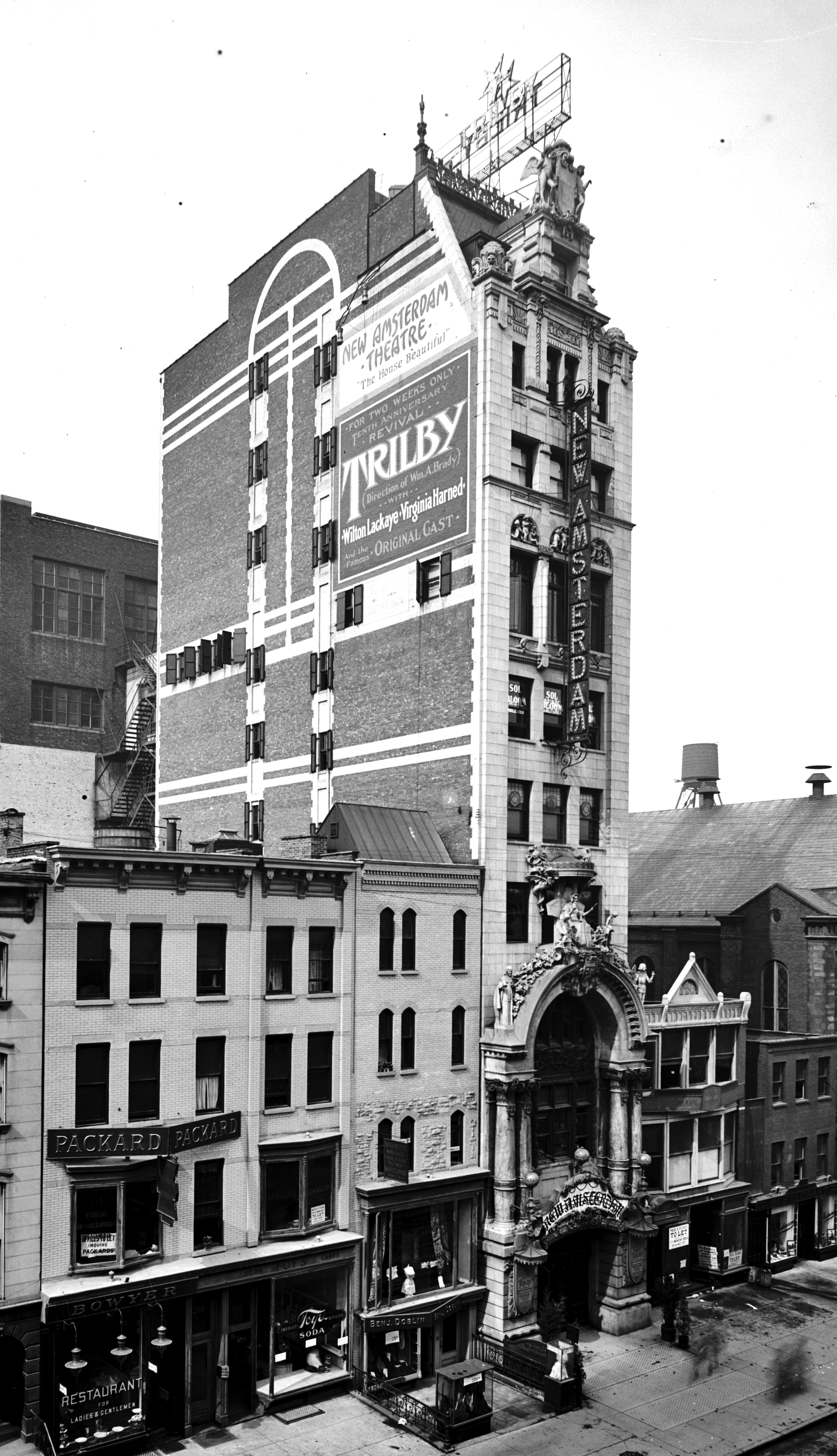
Amsterdam Theater - 42nd St. - New York Vity 1905 crop

== Vaudeville productions ==
Klaw & Erlanger were primarily producers for legitimate theaters, as opposed to vaudeville. Vaudeville had its own parallel chains of theaters, and its own dominant booking monopoly in the east, called the United Booking Office, run by E.F. Albee—set up in 1900 in conscious emulation of the Theatrical Syndicate.

The partners did cross over into the vaudeville business territory occasionally. The biggest foray was in April 1907, in concert with none other than Lee and J.J. Shubert. Together they established a new vaudeville booking operation called the United States Amusement Company, promising "Advanced Vaudeville", reportedly capitalized with $100 million. The Shuberts had hoped to fill up their oversupply of theater seats. The motivations of Klaw & Erlanger became clear seven months later when they and the Shuberts sold out the entire operation to Albee in November. Albee also paid a bonus fee $250,000 for the promise to stay out of vaudeville for another ten years.

| Title | Producer | Genre | Tour Dates |
|---|---|---|---|
| A Reign of Error | Klaw and Erlanger | Musical/Vaudeville | 1899 |
| The Rogers Brothers in Central Park | Klaw and Erlanger | Musical/Farce/Vaudeville | 1900-1901 |
| A Little Bit of Everything | Klaw and Erlanger | Musical/Vaudeville | 1904 |
| The Rogers Brothers in Paris | Klaw and Erlanger | Musical/Farce/Vaudeville | 1904 |
| The Ham Tree | Klaw and Erlanger | Musical/Vaudeville | 1905 |
