= Academy of Music (Atlantic City, New Jersey) =

Theatres of the same name in Atlantic City, New Jersey

Coordinates: 39.3576°N 74.4268°W

The Academy of Music was the name of three theatres located in Atlantic City, New Jersey at 180 S New York Ave on the Atlantic City Boardwalk. The various theatres were all destroyed by fires in 1892, 1898, and 1902. The first Academy of Music was built by Joseph Fralinger and his partners in 1892. The original structure of the theatre was destroyed by fire on June 22, 1892, before it ever opened to the public. It was rapidly rebuilt and opened on July 16, 1892. Over the next six years, the theatre predominantly served as a venue for variety theatre but also offered performances of plays, operas, and other public events such as lectures. The theatre was one of many buildings destroyed in February 1898.

Alone, Fralinger rebuilt the Academy of Music following the 1898 fire. This new structure opened on July 25, 1898, on the same site as the old theatre. It too presented a variety of entertainments, extending from operas and musicals, to burlesque, vaudeville, and straight plays; including productions that came to the theatre from Broadway. An even larger fire destroyed this theatre along with many hotels and other businesses in and around the Atlantic City Boardwalk on April 3, 1902.

In September 1907 construction began on a final theatre, the Apollo Theatre, on the 180 S New York Ave property. It opened on April 13, 1908. As with the other theatres, this structure was built under the leadership of Fralinger, this time with financial backing from theatre magnate Samuel F. Nixon. While Fralinger owned a primary interest in the theatre, it was leased by Nixon who operated the Apollo until his death in 1918 when his son Fred G. Nixon-Nirdlinger succeeded him. Nixon-Nirdlinger remained in charge of the theatre until his death in 1931. Under their leadership the theatre was known as Nixon's Apollo Theatre, and during their tenure it became an important tryout theatre for plays and musicals in development prior to their Broadway runs.

The Great Depression put an end to the Apollo Theatre's use as a legitimate theatre. It became a movie theatre in 1934 and operated in that capacity until July 1973. It re-opened as the Apollo Burlesque Theatre in June 1974. It presented live American burlesque shows in conjunction with screenings of X-rated films through 1977. In 1978 it briefly operated as a movie theatre called Charlie's Picture Palace before a fire caused by arson led to its permanent closure in September of that year. The building was demolished in 1985 not long after a piece on the forthcoming demolition was published by the Press of Atlantic City in the April 21, 1985 edition of the newspaper. Members of the newly created Atlantic City Historical Museum were given permission to remove items from the theatre in April 1985 shortly before the theatre was torn down.

== Academy of Music (1892–1898) ==
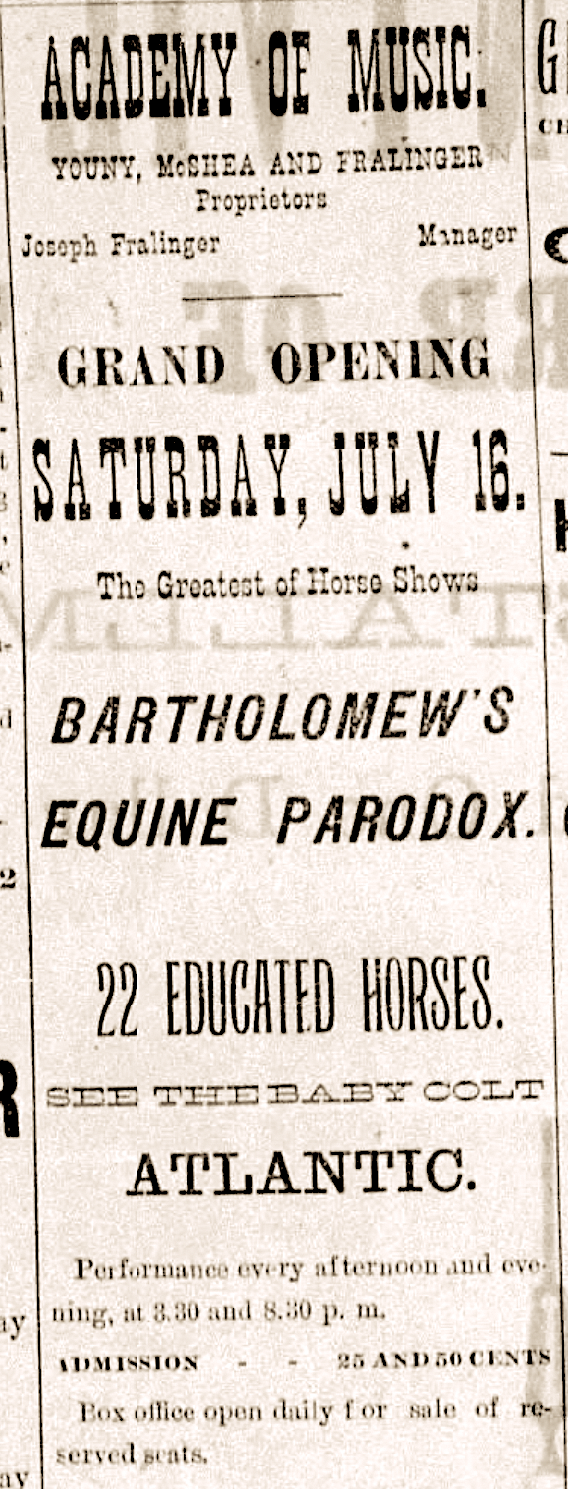
Advertisement for the grand opening of the Academy of Music. Published in the Atlantic City Sunday Gazette on June 26, 1892.

The Academy of Music was built by Joseph Fralinger of salt water taffy fame and his partners John Lake Young and Stewart McShea. The trio shared ownership of the theatre with Fralinger serving as the theatre's manager. While originally envisioned as a concert hall, Fralinger, Young, and McShea's first lessee was James Alberts who had recently purchased the traveling horse show Bartholomew's Equine Paradox. Alberts was under contract with the trio when construction on the theatre, then called the Beach Theatre, was underway in May 1892. It was announced the following month that the name of the new theatre would be the Academy of Music. Fralinger named the theatre after the famous Academy of Music in his native city of Philadelphia.

On June 22, 1892, a fire broke out near the newly built Academy of Music, spread to the structure, and destroyed it. The theatre was completed at the time of the fire and was scheduled to open in just a few days. Rehearsals for the pending opening were ongoing at the time of the incident. Fralinger, Young, & McShea quickly rebounded, and re-construction of the theatre was already underway less than a week after the first theatre had burned down. It was rapidly rebuilt, and opened with a performance by the Bartholomew's Equine Paradox on July 16, 1892. Described as a "precision horse show", it featured "twenty-two educated horses" performing a variety of tricks.

The Academy of Music operated mainly as a variety theatre featuring predominantly novelty acts for the next six years. However, the theatre also programmed more elevated repertoire like operas, including hosting the Aborn Opera Company for performances of Alfred Cellier's Dorothy (1893), Michael William Balfe's The Bohemian Girl (1895), Said Pasha (1894), and Adam Itzel Jr.'s The Tar and the Tartar (1895). Agostino Montegriffo's English Opera Company also performed at the theatre in 1893, as did soprano Sissieretta Jones who gave a concert at the theatre in 1894. The Noss Jollity Company performed burlesque at the theatre in 1894, and the New-Orleans-based minstrel show Gorton's Minstrels toured to the theatre for performances that same year.

Comstock's Minstrels was the first group to perform at the theatre in 1895. Later that year a new stage adaptation of George Wilbur Peck's Peck's Bad Boy premiered at the theatre; the actor Robert McWade portrayed the title role in a production of Rip Van Winkle; and seven plays were performed at the theatre by Thomas E. Shea's theatre company. In April 1895 the theatre underwent renovations which included adding an entrance to the theatre that had previously been a part of the Empire Theatre in Philadelphia. In June 1895 Victorian dress reform advocate Annie Jenness Miller gave two lectures at the theatre. In October 1895 the theatre presented an evening with American humorists Bill Nye and Bert Poole, and the vaudeville comic duo Bertram and Willard presented their comic sketch The Engineer.

In 1896 soprano Alice Johnson was the prima donna of a season of opera at the Academy of Music that was led by conductor Joseph Tressi of Philadelphia's Grand Opera House. Billed as Young and Fralinger's Opera Company, the season included performances of Carl Millöcker's The Black Hussar, Franz von Suppé's Boccaccio, William Vincent Wallace's Maritana, Robert Planquette's Les cloches de Corneville, and Edmond Audran's La mascotte. That same year the stage hypnoptist Xenophon LaMotte Sage performed at the theatre. In December 1896 the year concluded with a production of Lincoln J. Carter's melodrama The Heart of Chicago.

In 1897 Fralinger bought out his partners, Young and McShea, and became the sole owner of the academy. Edward Harrigan's 1877 play Old Lavender was staged at the theatre in February 1897 with music by David Braham. The following month actress Isadore Rush appeared at the theatre as the lead actress in George Broadhurst's The Wrong Mr. Wright. In October 1897 actor Russ Whytal and his wife starred in a production of For Fair Virginia at the theater.

The Academy of Music was destroyed by fire in February 1898. It was one of approximately fifty business establishments destroyed by the blaze which burned an entire city block, which mainly consisted of stores, restaurants, and entertainment venues like casinos.

== Academy of Music (1898–1902) ==
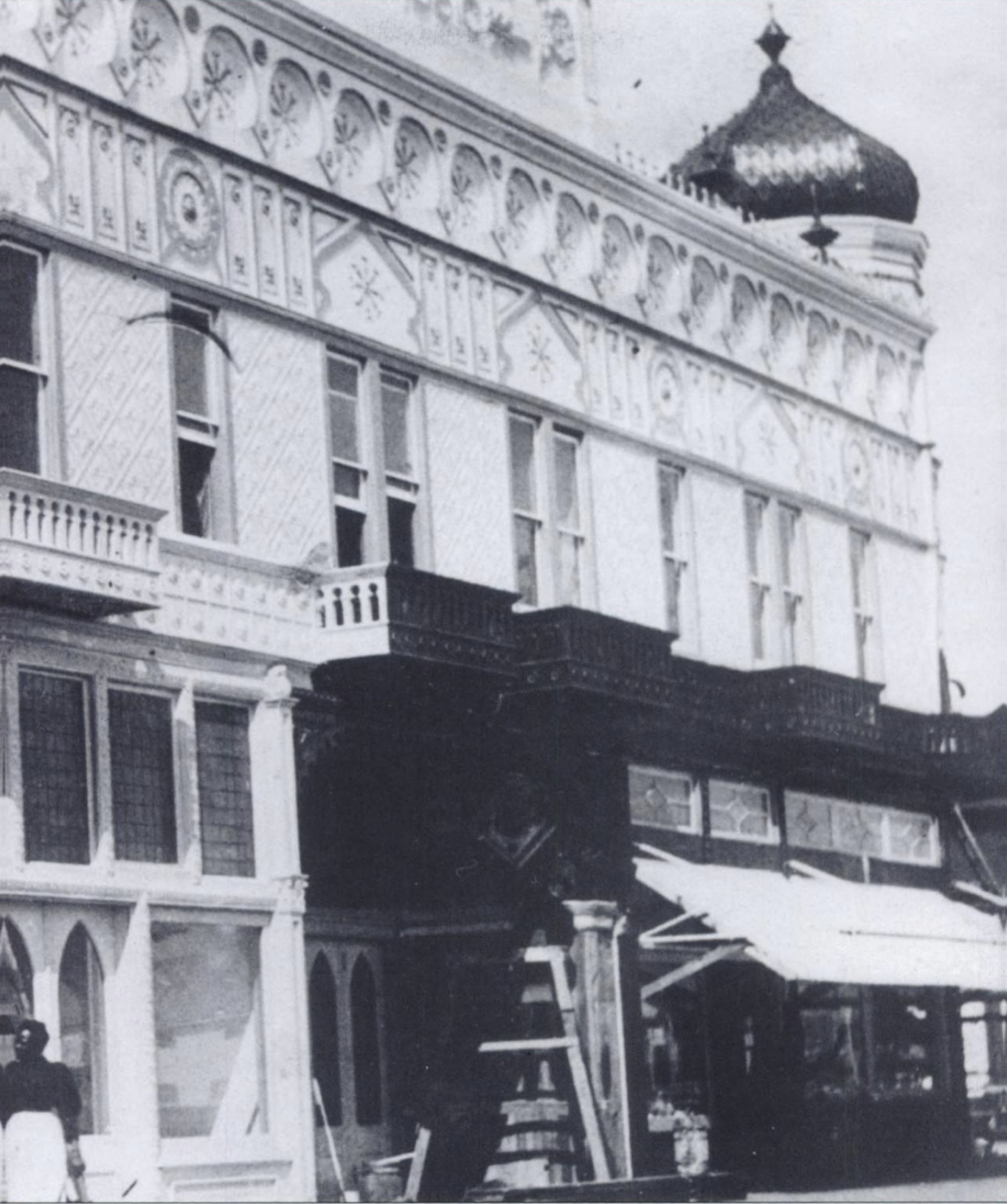
c. 1898 photograph of the exterior of the Academy of Music which is on the right. This is the structure that was destroyed by fire on April 3, 1902. On the left a woman stands on the boardwalk in front of a storefront adjacent to the theatre.

Fralinger rebuilt the Academy of Music following the 1898 fire, this time without any other business partners. This new structure opened on July 25, 1898, on the same site as the old theatre with a production of John Fay Palmer's The Egyptian of Pompeii. It sat 1,600 people and was built entirely out of brick and iron; materials chosen to prevent another destruction by fire. It was first ocean front building built from brick constructed in Atlantic City.

Shortly after the premiere of the new theatre, the Aborn Opera Company presented a series of operas at the academy in 1898 with soprano Ida Mulle as their prima donna. These included performances of Faust, Fra Diavolo, Cavalleria rusticana, H.M.S. Pinafore, and The Mikado. George Stetson's touring version of Uncle Tom's Cabin was a popular success at the theatre in September 1898. This was followed by Charles H. Hoyt's A Bunch of Keys with a cast led by Ada Bothner as Teddy; a series of plays starring the actor Creston Clarke; and Charles Coghlan starring in his own play, The Royal Box, which had just completed its run on Broadway at the Fifth Avenue Theatre.

In January 1899 the actor Andrew Mack starred in a production of The Ragged Earl at the theatre. The following month Eugenie Blair starred in a production of A Lady of Quality at the academy. Lincoln J. Carter's American Civil War melodrama Chattanooga was staged at the theatre in March 1899, and the Broadway production of Charlotte Blair Parker's Way Down East came to the theatre after ending its New York run in May 1899. The resident orchestra of the Taylor Opera House in Trenton gave a series of concerts at the theatre in the summer of 1899. Edward E. Rice's 1492 was staged at the theatre in July 1899, and the following month opera singer Pauline Hall appeared at the theatre in the title role of Erminie. Creston Clarke returned to the academy in September 1899 in the title role in Hamlet, and the year ended with a production of A. Q. Scammon's The Sleeping City.

Creston Clarke and his company returned to the academy for a series of plays in 1900; among them As You Like It and Richard III. Clyde Fitch's Sapho was performed in two separate runs at the theatre in 1900; having a better reception with the Atlantic City press who defended the play after it had been accused as obscene by much of the New York press. George H. Primrose and Lew Dockstader brought their blackface minstrel show to the theatre in July 1900, and William H. West's minstrel show was in residence at the theater the following month. Actor Charles L. Davis starred in the title role of his play Alvin Joslin at the theatre in September 1900, and the following month the theatre staged A Romance of Coon Hollow using the same sets that were used in the original production at the Fourteenth Street Theatre.

A production of Owen Davis's Through the Breakers opened at the Academy of Music on New Year's Day 1901. This was followed by a production of Charles E. Callahan's Fogg's Ferry. The Aubrey Stock Company was in residence at the theatre in February 1901. The Mask and Wig Club of the University of Pennsylvania performed a musical burlesque at the theatre the following April, and that same month the vaudeville fraternity White Rats of America put on a variety show at the theatre. In May 1901 a revival of East Lynne was staged at the theatre by actress Agnes Burroughs and her theatre troupe. The following month Scottish actress Cecilia Loftus starred in a one-act play version of the novella Undine at the theatre. After this the 1901 Broadway revival production of The Casino Girl toured to the theatre.

In January 1902 the Academy of Music staged the premiere of Joseph J. Dowling's melodrama Roxana's Claim. Following this the Aubrey Stock Company returned to present a series of plays at the theatre.

The Academy of Music was destroyed by fire on April 3, 1902. This was a much larger fire than the 1898 fire. The 1902 fire destroyed numerous hotels, businesses, and other buildings in and around the Atlantic City Boardwalk including the Academy of Music. The New York Times reported that the fire began in the Tarlton Hotel which was at that time unoccupied, and that it spread rapidly. It destroyed two entire blocks of the Atlantic City Boardwalk that extended from Illinois Avenue to South Carolina Avenue, and from the beach front to Pacific Avenue. Young's Pier was significantly damaged by the fire, and it was reported that many people fleeing the fire had to be rescued by boats.

== Apollo Theatre (1907–1985) ==
=== Nixon's Apollo Theatre ===
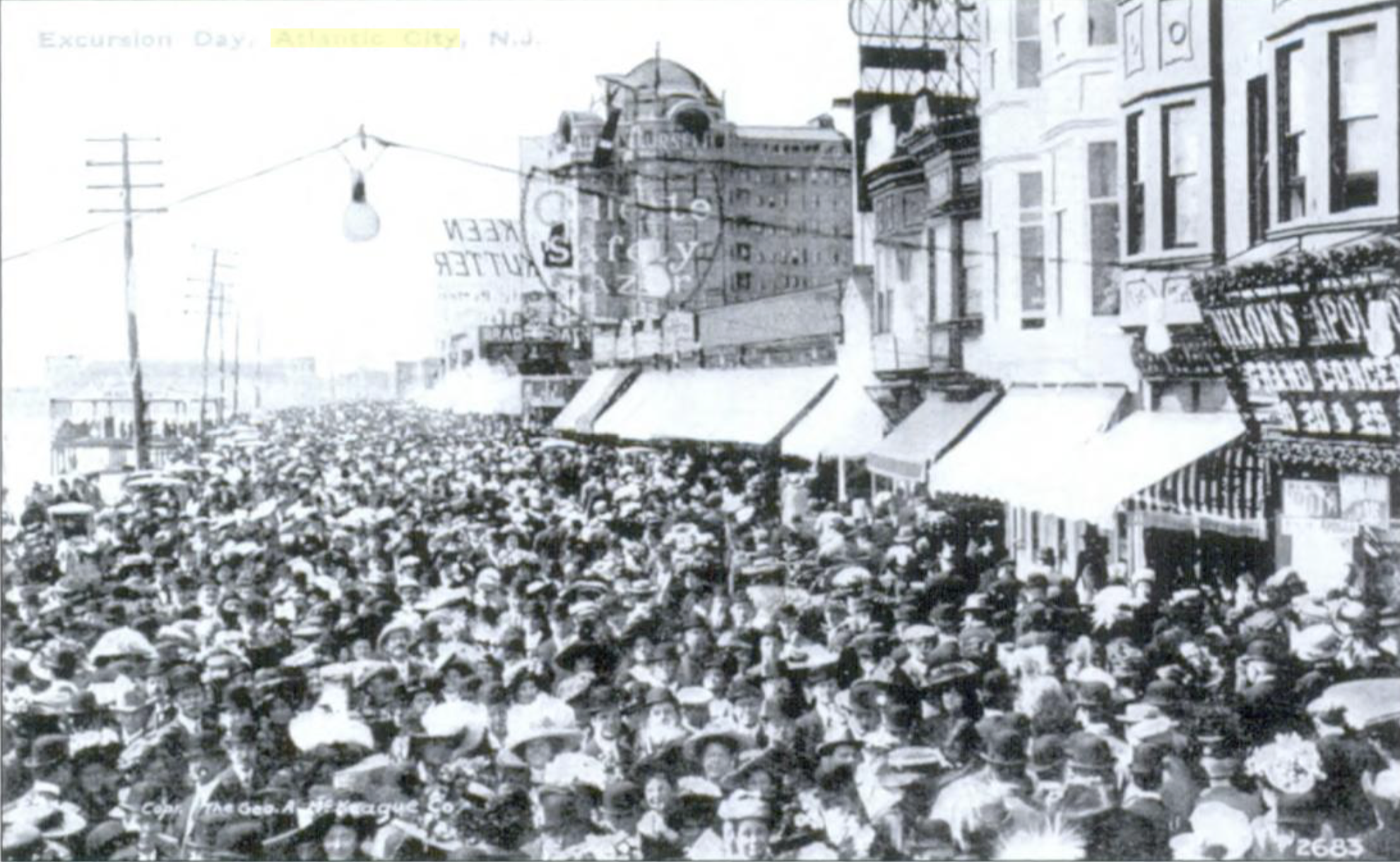
1912 postcard depicting a crowd on the Atlantic City Boardwalk. On the far right is the exterior of Nixon's Apollo Theatre with its name visible on the marquis.

Fralinger initially expressed an unwillingness to rebuild the Academy of Music a fourth time after having had three fires. The 1892, 1898, and 1902 fires which destroyed the various Academy of Music buildings had all begun in other locations external to the theatres, and Fralinger viewed himself as unlucky. Construction on a new theatre did not begin until September 1907; this time with Fralinger having investors help pay for the theatre rather than using entirely his own money. The primary financial backer for the new theatre other than Franlinger was Philadelphia theatre magnate Samuel F. Nixon. Nixon signed a ten-year lease of the Apollo in 1907.

The naming for Fralinger's new theatre was decided through public input: first through a public contest for name suggestions, and then a public vote in September 1907 in which the public decided between four possible candidates. The candidates were the Plaza Theatre, Fralinger's Theatre, the Lyric Theatre, and the Apollo Theatre. By October 1907, newspaper articles were referring to the theatre as the Apollo Theatre. The Apollo Theatre was not completed until the Spring of 1908 and it had its inaugural performance on April 13, 1908, with a performance of Mary's Lamb starring the actor Richard Carle.

The Apollo Theatre, often billed as Nixon's Apollo Theatre, was for many years regarded as Atlantic City's premiere theatre drawing big name stars such as Otis Skinner, Helen Hayes, W. C. Fields, Al Jolson, Ethel Waters, Fred Astaire, Bojangles Robinson, the Marx Brothers, and Lionel, Ethel, and John Barrymore. Samuel F. was the managing force behind the new theatre from the time it opened in 1908 until his death in 1918. His son Fred G. Nixon-Nirdlinger then successfully took over the theatre, and in 1922 he signed a twenty-year lease in a contract with the Fralinger family.

The Apollo Theatre became a well-regarded tryout theatre for shows in their development process prior to going to Broadway; including ten different iterations of the Ziegfeld Follies. F. Scott Fitzgerald's The Vegetable was given its premiere at the theatre on November 19, 1923. Sigmund Romberg's The Student Prince premiered at the theatre on October 27, 1924, under the name In Old Heidelberg.

In 1931 Nixon-Nirdlinger was murdered by his wife, and the theatre became dormant not long after. Payments on the lease to the Fralinger estate, which owned the theatre, lapsed and a lawsuit was brought against the Nixon-Nirdlinger estate. A settlement was made, and the lease was dissolved on January 1, 1933.

=== Cinema and burlesque theatre ===
The Apollo Theatre remained Atlantic City's premiere theatre until the 1930s. Both the death of Nixon-Nirdlinger and financial pressures of the Great Depression have been blamed for causing the theatre to remain mostly unused between 1931 and 1934. It re-opened as a movie theatre in 1934 with a screening of the film Nana. It remained active as a movie theatre until July 1973 when it showed its last film, Last Tango in Paris. It was purchased by Albert Cohen from Herman Casel in 1972. Casel had purchased the theatre from the Fralinger family in 1969.

In 1974 the Apollo Theatre was purchased by Al Baker Jr. who transformed the theatre into a burlesque theater called the Apollo Burlesque Theatre. It opened on June 21, 1974, after a $50,000.00 renovation with a show entitled Burlesque is My Thing in a cast led by Hope Diamond. By October 1976 the theatre was presenting X rated films in conjunction with live burlesque entertainment. The theatre was still following this practice as late as September 1977.

The theatre briefly operated as a movie theatre called Charlie's Picture Palace in 1978. Three teenage boys set a fire on September 15, 1978, which damaged the theatre and caused it to close. The building was demolished in 1985. Members of the newly created Atlantic City Historical Museum took items from the building in April 1985 shortly before the building was torn down. The Atlantic Palace Condominium and some shops now occupy the site.
