= Fred G. Nixon-Nirdlinger =

American theatre manager (1877–1931)

- Portrait, 1903
- Born: 1877
- Died: 1931 (aged 53–54); France
- Occupation: Theater operator

Frederick G. Nixon-Nirdlinger (1877–1931) was an American theater operator who controlled all of the main theaters in Philadelphia. He was shot dead by his wife in their apartment on the French Riviera. The subsequent trial caused a huge sensation.

== Life ==
Nixon-Nirdlinger was the son of Samuel F. Nixon (originally Samuel Frederic Nirdlinger) and Sallie Strauss. His father and J. Fred Zimmerman Sr. were partners. By the mid-1890s Nixon and Zimmerman controlled the Broad, the Park, the Chestnut and the Chestnut Street Opera House, the four most important theaters in Philadelphia. They also owned first-class theaters in Pennsylvania, West Virginia and Ohio.

Nixon-Nirdlinger became a partner in the Nixon & Zimmerman theatrical firm. He managed the Park Theatre and People’s Theatre in Philadelphia. An Associated Press story distributed in December 1903 said "…Samuel F. Nixon Nirdlinger is today the richest and most powerful theatrical manager and promoter in America…. His son, Frederick G. Nixon Nirdlinger, is an assistant to his father, and has won (his own) fame in his profession…”

Marcus Loew developed a growing chain of vaudeville theaters. They competed with the agency run by Nixon-Nirdlinger, who filed a complaint with the U.S. Department of Justice alleging that Loew and others had established a virtual monopoly of the vaudeville business. The "Philadelphia Vaudeville War" continued until an agreement was struck on 13 December 1913 by which Loew gave up his holdings in the Metropolitan Opera House and Chestnut Street Opera House, and in exchange gained a stake in a new company being formed by Benjamin Franklin Keith. Samuel F. Nixon, Nixon-Nirdlinger, J. Fred Zimmerman and Edward Franklin Albee were parties to the agreement.

Nixon-Nirdlinger became the owner of four theaters in Philadelphia, and others in Pittsburgh, Harrisburg, Reading and smaller places. As head of the Nixon & Zimmerman organization he operated the 1,400-seat Maryland Theater in Cumberland. In 1913 he leased the Metropolitan Opera House in Philadelphia. In 1920 the lease was transferred to the Lu Lu Temple of the Nobles of the Mystic Shrine.

Nixon-Nirdlinger was living in an apartment on the French Riviera in 1931 when he was shot and killed by his wife, Charlotte. Their infant children were present in the apartment. The sensational story of the murder and subsequent trial, in which Charlotte was acquitted on the grounds of self-defense, made headlines for months.

== Sources ==
- Connolly, Thomas F. (2000). George Jean Nathan and the Making of Modern American Drama Criticism. Fairleigh Dickinson Univ Press. p. 23. ISBN 978-0-8386-3780-7.
- Davis, Andrew (2010). America's Longest Run: A History of the Walnut Street Theatre. Penn State Press. ISBN 978-0-271-03578-9.
- Donatello, Sally W. (November 2001). "Frederick G. Nixon – Nirdlinger Scrapbook". University of Delaware.
- Headley, Robert K. (2008). Maryland's Motion Picture Theaters. Arcadia Publishing. ISBN 978-0-7385-5384-9.
- Hoefling, Larry J. (April 26, 2010). Nils Thor Granlund: Show Business Entrepreneur and America's First Radio Star. McFarland. ISBN 978-0-7864-5599-7.
- Holmes, Sean P. (February 1, 2013). Weavers of Dreams, Unite!: Actors' Unionism in Early Twentieth-Century America. University of Illinois Press. ISBN 978-0-252-09468-2.
- Irish, Rosemary (2004). Grandmother Irish. AuthorHouse. ISBN 978-1-4685-1372-1.
- Pennsylvania Historical Commission (1939). Philadelphia, a Guide to the Nation's Birthplace. Best Books. ISBN 978-1-62376-058-8.
- "Samuel F. Nixon Nirdlinger". Associated Press. December 1903.
- "Samuel Frederic Nixon Nirdlinger". ancestry.com.
