= Chestnut Street Opera House =

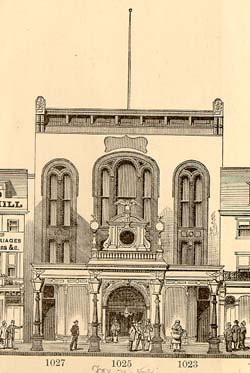
- 1880 sketch of the Chestnut Street Opera House
- Interactive map of the Chestnut Street Opera House area
- Alternative names: Fox's American Theatre

General information
- Location: 1021–1029 Chestnut Street, Philadelphia, Pennsylvania, United States
- Coordinates: 39°57′01″N 75°09′29″W
- Opened: 1870
- Renovated: 1877
- Demolished: 1940

Other information
- Seating capacity: 1,656

The Chestnut Street Opera House was a theatre located at 1021–1029 Chestnut Street in Philadelphia, Pennsylvania. Built by theatre impresario Robert Fox on the former site of the Pennsylvania Academy of the Fine Arts, it opened as a venue for vaudeville in 1870 as Fox's New American Theatre. The theatre was destroyed by fire in 1877 and was rebuilt that same year. After being acquired by George K. Goodwin, the theatre was remodeled, renamed the Chestnut Street Opera House, and re-opened as a legitimate theatre in 1880. It continued to operate as a legitimate theatre, first under the management of theatre magnates Samuel F. Nixon and J. Fred Zimmerman Sr., who acquired the theatre's lease in 1882, and later under the Shubert Organization, who acquired the theatre in 1916. It was still considered one of Philadelphia's leading legitimate theatres during the 1920s and 1930s. The theatre was also used as a venue for films and was a model theatre for the Triangle Film Corporation in 1915–1916. The theatre closed in 1939 and was demolished in 1940.

== Operational history ==
=== Fox's New American Theatre ===
Robert Fox built Fox's New American Theatre as a vaudeville house in 1870 on a site on Chestnut Street leased from the Pennsylvania Academy of the Fine Arts (PAFA). It was previously the site of the PAFA's first and second buildings. The site of the New American Theatre was 100 by 173 feet (30 by 53 m). The Chestnut Street frontage was occupied by an entrance hall behind an elaborate classical facade with Corinthian columns and a central arch topped by a clock and a sculpture of an eagle. The auditorium had three levels of seating, accommodating 1,656 patrons.

The theatre opened on December 17, 1870, with what was billed as "a powerful combination of amusements of all nations". In the Philadelphia Evening Telegraph review, it was described as a "family performance" and "entirely unexceptionable" and acknowledged as a "great success" due to the audience's obvious enjoyment and the size of crowd. A republication of a review of the theatre from The New York Clipper in the Philadelphia Evening Telegraph described the theatre as "one of the prettiest places of amusement in the country". This review also criticized widespread reports in the American press that the theatre was "unsafe and liable to tumble down at any moment, and bring death and destruction to all assembled therein"; taking care to defend the building and proclaiming the criticisms as "untenable". The review further predicted the "edifices would doubtless remain for years monuments to the architects' and builders' skill and workmanship".

Despite this prediction, Fox's New American Theatre was destroyed by fire on February 25, 1877. It was rebuilt that same year by Stephen Rush Jr. Fox had previously run his original Fox's American Theatre in Walnut Street from 1865 to 1870. That theatre had also burned down and been rebuilt in 1867. The Philadelphia Times reported that all but one of the theatres connected to Fox had "found their end amid charred timbers and smoking ruins".

=== Chestnut Street Opera House ===
In 1880 Fox's theatre was acquired by George K. Goodwin, the manager of the Walnut Street Theatre, and reopened as a legitimate theatre, the Chestnut Street Opera House (CSOH). Newly remodeled, the theatre re-opened on September 20, 1880, with a production of the Danicheffs. Goodwin died in 1881 and that same year Philadelphia clothier and real estate businessman Joseph Monroe Bennett (a former partner of John Wanamaker) purchased the site of the theatre. In 1882 the theatre magnates Samuel F. Nixon and J. Fred Zimmerman Sr. acquired the lease of the CSOH from Goodwin's widow. Nixon and Zimmerman were part of the powerful Theatrical Syndicate that reshaped the entertainment business in the United States during the late 19th century by creating a powerful monopoly. The actor Richard Mansfield was a vocal critic of the Theatrical Syndicate, and made an impassioned speech against the syndicate from the stage of the CSOH. His speech was interrupted when the theatre's manager dropped the curtain in front of him to silence his protest. Mansfield was subsequently blacklisted from all of the syndicate's theatres.

When J. M. Bennett died in 1898, he bequeathed the theatre in his will to the University of Pennsylvania to fund women's education. The will was contested by Bennett's daughter, Imogene E. Bennett Wellens, who had been disinherited. The matter went through several legal actions, ultimately arriving before the Supreme Court of Pennsylvania. That court validated the will on February 24, 1902, ruling in favor of the university.

From 1913 the theatre was run as a luxury $1-a-seat cinema (equivalent to $33 in 2025) by Joseph Jefferson (J. J.) McCarthy, who managed the national release of D. W. Griffith's The Birth of a Nation in 1915. Between 1915 and 1916 it was one of three model theatres for the Triangle Film Corporation, along with the Knickerbocker in New York and the Studebaker in Chicago. The aim had been to attract "the very best people" and charge $2 for a ticket, equivalent to $64 in 2025, but the theatres were unable to cover their costs. Afterwards major films were still shown occasionally with reserved seating. The theatre was acquired by the Shubert Organization theatre chain in 1916. In the 1920s and 1930s it was one of the leading legitimate theatres in Philadelphia. The theatre closed in 1939 and was demolished in 1940.

The theatre's former address eventually became the location of the Mercantile Library from 1952 until its closure in 1989 due to asbestos concerns. As of 2024 the library is still standing but remains vacant, though a mural commemorating the library was painted on the building in 2019.

== Notable productions ==
=== Nineteenth century ===
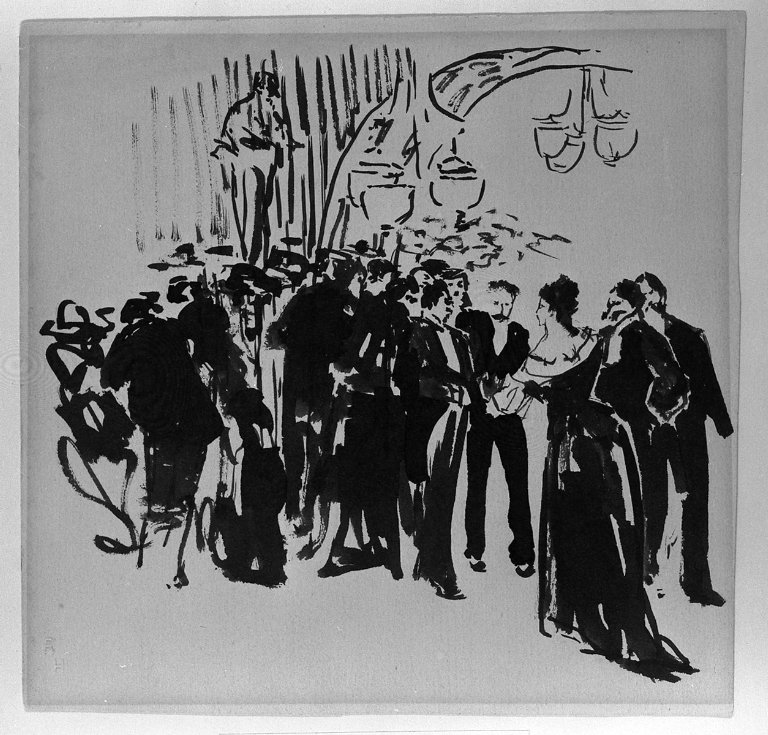
Party Scene by Robert Henri. Part of the collection of the Brooklyn Academy of Music. Henri would often sketch audiences at the Chestnut Street Opera House, and it is possible this ink drawing was made at the theatre.

The Chestnut Street Opera House (CSOH) presented productions and events starring several notable entertainers and figures of the late 19th and early 20th centuries. The celebrated Italian tragedienne Adelaide Ristori performed the title role in Euripides's Medea at the theatre during her 1875 American tour. She later returned to the theatre in the title role of Paolo Giacometti's five-act historical play Elizabeth, Queen of England in November 1884, performing for the first time in her career in the English language when the production opened at the CSOH on November 10.

The world premiere of Reginald De Koven and Harry B. Smith's operetta The Begum was given at the CSOH on November 7, 1877. It starred German-born American actress Mathilde Cottrelly, the comic opera singer Marion Manola, vaudeville entertainer Digby Bell, contralto Laura Joyce Bell, tenor Harry Macdonough, and the German-born American actor Hubert Wilke (1855–1940). On May 22, 1882, a musical adaptation of Harriet Beecher Stowe's anti-slavery novel Uncle Tom's Cabin by composer Caryl Florio and dramatist H. Wayne Ellis premiered at the CSOH. The production starred Carrie Swain as Topsy.

Philadelphia actor George W. Munroe had the first major success of his career when he joined the touring production of Scott Marble's Over the Garden Wall when it reached the CSOH in August/September 1884. A female impersonator, the musical was modified to incorporate Munroe's talents, and it introduced Munroe's comic character of the Irish biddy Aunt Bridget to American audiences. That character was tremendously popular, and Munroe continued to portray the role on tour nationally in a succession of plays written by Marble, including My Aunt Bridget and Aunt Bridget's Baby, over a 12-year-long span.

The Mask and Wig Club, an all-male collegiate club associated with the University of Pennsylvania, presented its first staged production at the CSOH on June 4, 1889. As of 2024, the club remains active in staging musical theatre productions. H. Grattan Donnelly and Sidney R. Ellis's Darkest Russia was given its premiere at the CSOH on September 18, 1893.

The actor Edwin Booth appeared at the theatre multiple times during his career, beginning with a series of plays by William Shakespeare staged at the theatre in March 1896. These included the roles of Iago in Otello, Brutus in Julius Caesar, and the title roles in Macbeth, Hamlet, Richard III, and King Lear. He later returned to the theatre in the title role of Edward Bulwer-Lytton's Richelieu in 1897 and as Shylock in The Merchant of Venice in 1890. On April 15, 1886, Walt Whitman delivered a free public lecture on Abraham Lincoln from the stage of the opera house; an event paid for by two prominent Philadelphians: journalist Talcott Williams and lawyer Thomas Donaldson.

=== Twentieth century ===
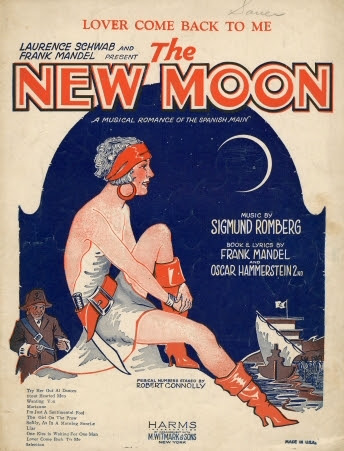
Front cover of sheet music for the song "Lover Come Back To Me" from The New Moon

The CSOH staged the United States premiere of Oscar Straus's A Waltz Dream on January 6, 1908. On October 8, 1912, Victor Herbert's operetta The Lady of the Slipper was given its world premiere at the CSOH, with the composer conducting. Based on the "Cinderella" folk tale, the operetta starred Elsie Janis as the fabled protagonist. Others in the cast included Vivian Rushmore as the fairy godmother, Vernon Castle as Atzel, David C. Montgomery as Punks, Fred Stone as Spooks, Allene Crater as Romneya, Lillian Lee as Dollbabia, Queenie Vassar as Freakette, Peggy Wood as Valerie, and Lydia Lopokova as a featured dancer.

The CSOH was one of three theaters selected by the Fox Film Corporation for a simultaneous premiere of the film A Daughter of the Gods on October 17, 1916, the other two being the Lyric Theatre in New York City and the Pitt Theatre in Pittsburgh.

The CSOH experienced a night of drama backstage when the musical revue Frolics of 1922 toured to the theatre in 1923. Frolics, while headlined by violinist and actor Herman Timberg, was mainly successful due to the performance of the African-American comic duo Buck & Bubbles. Despite good ticket sales, the production was not profitable. Its finances had been mismanaged by the Shuberts, as tickets were priced at too low a price point to earn enough revenue to match the contracted salaries of the production's stars. As a result, the production had run out of funds and the producers had not paid the cast in several weeks. In response to this untenable situation, one of the actors in the show, Nat Nazarro, arrived at the theatre with two lawyers and two deputy sheriffs and confiscated the sheet music of the orchestra, the production's costumes, and some of the sets just prior to the scheduled April 5, 1923, performance time. Nazarro refused to return the necessary items for the show to proceed until the entire cast had been paid its back wages in full. The "house was in tumult" for an hour, before the producers finally provided the cast with their wages, and the show was able to continue.

Sigmund Romberg and Oscar Hammerstein II's operetta The New Moon premiered at the CSOH on December 22, 1927. The cast was led by Pacie Ripple as Monsieur Beaunoir, Evelyn Herbert as Marianne Beaunoir, and Robert Halliday as Robert Misson. Ginger Rogers starred in the world premiere of the musical Top Speed at the CSOH on November 13, 1929. Harry Ruby composed the show's score, Bert Kalmar was the lyricist, and the book was co-written by Guy Bolton, Ruby, and Kalmar.

On Christmas Day 1935, the CSOH presented the premiere of Zoe Akins's O Evening Star, a play about a supposedly fictional actress Amy Bellaire. However, the play's similarities to the life of Marie Dressler and the performance of its star Jobyna Howland led the reviewer of The New York Times to proclaim it was a play about Dressler with Howland giving a convincing portrayal of that specific actress. On November 30, 1936, the CSOH presented the world premiere of George S. Kaufman and Moss Hart's comedic play You Can't Take It with You. The play became a smash hit on Broadway and won the 1937 Pulitzer Prize for Drama.
