= Samuel F. Nixon =

American theatre owner (1848–1918)

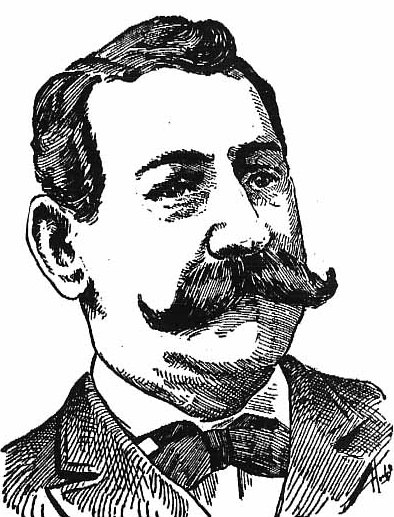
- Born: Samuel Frederic Nirdlinger; October 13, 1848; Fort Wayne, Indiana, USA
- Died: November 13, 1918 (aged 70); Philadelphia, Pennsylvania, USA
- Occupation: Theater owner
- Known for: Theatrical Syndicate

Samuel Frederic Nixon (né Nirdlinger; October 13, 1848 – November 13, 1918) was an American theater owner. He was known as one of the organizers of the Theatrical Syndicate, which monopolized theatrical bookings in the United States for several years.

== Early years ==
Samuel Frederic Nirdlinger was born in Fort Wayne, Indiana, on October 13, 1848, the son of Frederic Nirdlinger and Hannah Meyerson. The Nirdlingers were of German Jewish origin. They had traveled by covered wagon from Chambersburg, Pennsylvania, to Fort Wayne, where they founded a frontier trading post. His father and uncle became clothiers. The Jews of Fort Wayne formed the Society for Visiting the Sick and Burying the Dead in 1848, with Frederic Nirdlinger as president. Nirdlinger's daughter Ella married Charles Naret Nathan. Their son was the drama critic George Jean Nathan, editor of The Smart Set and co-founder with H. L. Mencken of The American Mercury.

Samuel F. Nirdlinger first worked for the family business, then left to work for George K. Goodwin, a Philadelphia theater entrepreneur. Nirdlinger adopted the name of Samuel F. Nixon for business purposes. He became a partner of J. Fred Zimmerman, Sr. (1843–1925), an advance agent. They formed the Nixon & Zimmerman theatrical firm. The two started as lessees of theaters, and later became owners. Nirdlinger married Sallie Strauss. They had two children, Carrie Nixon Nirdlinger (1874–1970) and Fred G. Nixon-Nirdlinger (1877–1931).

George K. Goodwin died in the summer of 1881. Nixon and Zimmerman acquired the lease of the Walnut Street Theatre from his widow. Soon after she sold them the lease on the Chestnut Street Opera House. They already owned Haverly's, later called the Chestnut Street Theatre, and they now dominated the theater business in Philadelphia. By the mid-1990s, Nixon and Zimmerman controlled the Broad, the Park, the Chestnut and the Chestnut Street Opera House, the four most important theaters in Philadelphia. They also owned first-class theaters in Pennsylvania, West Virginia and Ohio.

== Theatrical Syndicate ==
By the mid-1890s there were many touring companies playing in growing numbers of theaters around the country. The booking system, or lack of system, created double bookings and empty houses. A. L. Erlanger (1860–1930) and Marcus Klaw ran an east coast theatrical exchange. In 1895, Klaw and Erlanger met with Nixon, Zimmerman and producers Charles Frohman, Al Hayman and William Harris to discuss ways to bring order to the chaos. In 1896 this group set up the Theatrical Syndicate, or Theatrical Trust, headed by Erlanger. The agreement was ostensibly aimed at reducing losses to theaters from similar attractions competing in nearby locations, from touring companies from the inability to plan routes that minimized travel, and to both theaters and companies from indiscriminate bookings.

The syndicate could force a producer who wanted to play in one of their houses to play only in syndicate houses throughout the tour. The syndicate in effect created a monopoly of venues for first-class theater production. The syndicate demanded a share of the profits of the theaters, and a fee from the producers. The members also began expanding the number of theaters they directly owned or leased. The syndicate soon controlled hundreds of theaters across the USA. Major performers such as Minnie Maddern Fiske and Sarah Bernhardt who would not agree to the syndicate's terms were locked out of major venues and had to perform in tents or minor theaters.

The syndicate eventually lost power to the Shubert Organization. The Shubert brothers, owners of a chain of upstate New York theaters, began buying property across the country and offering an alternative to the syndicate. They at first posed as believers in a free market. They soon switched to the same exclusive practices as the syndicate. By 1910 they were on an equal footing with the syndicate in terms of the numbers of attractions they could book. New competition came from movies, an increasingly popular alternative to live shows.

== Later years ==
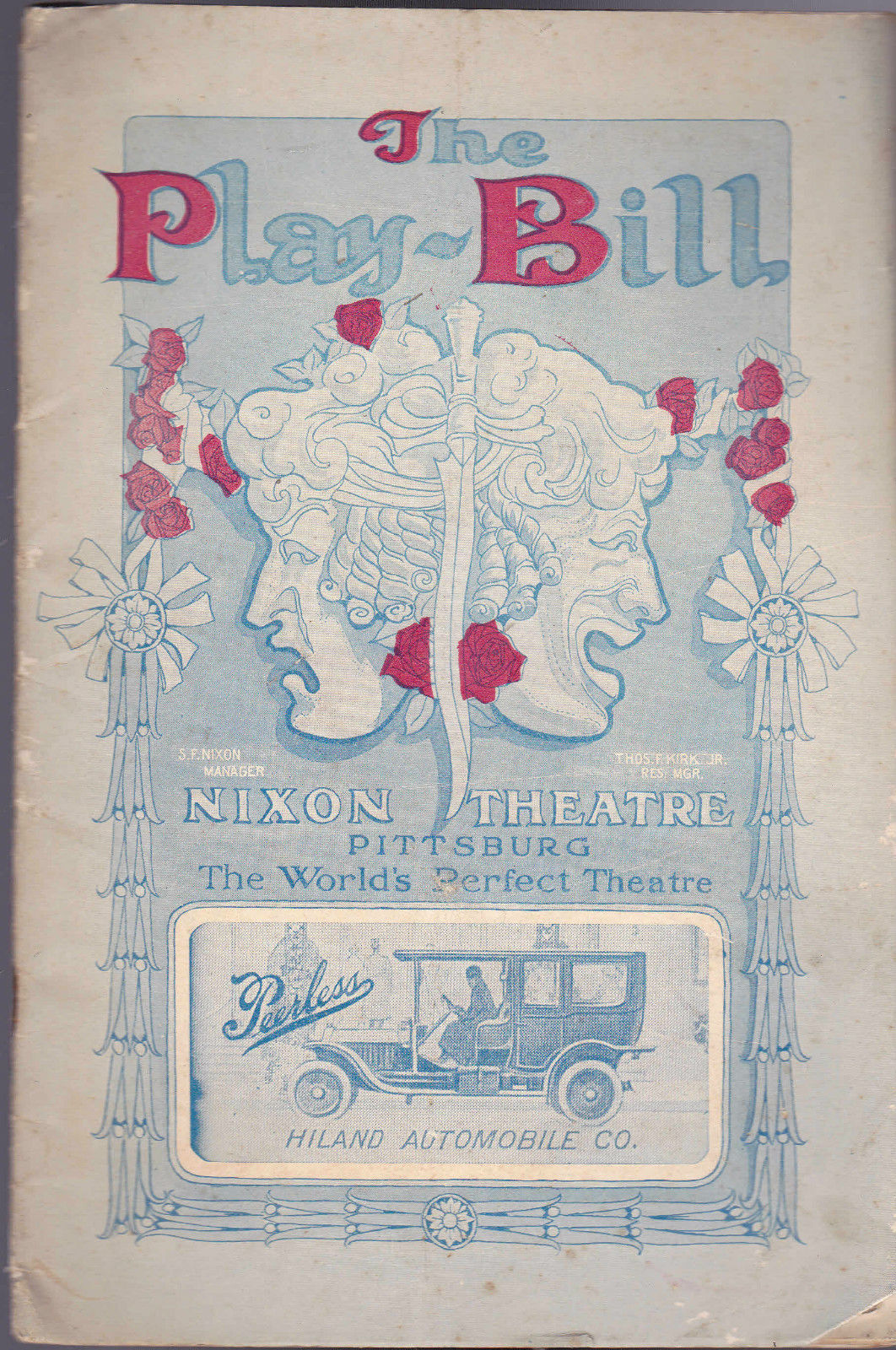
Playbill from the Nixon Theatre, Pittsburgh for a 1911 Sarah Bernhardt performance of L'Aiglon

Nixon came to control theaters across the Midwest. On December 7, 1903, Samuel F. Nixon opened the Nixon Theater in Pittsburgh, Pennsylvania, on the corner of 6th Avenue and William Penn Place. The ornate Beaux Arts style building was opulently decorated. The interior featured massive fake-marble columns capped with gold, framed wall panels that seemed like damask silk, and velvet and silk draperies. The theater hosted many star performers, and put on elaborate shows. In 1905 four horse-drawn chariots came on stage in "Ben Hur", and a herd of camels, horses, goats featured in "Garden of Allah". The theater closed in 1950, when it was sold to Alcoa. It was demolished to make way for the present Regional Enterprise Tower.

Samuel F. Nixon leased the 2,000-seat Apollo Theatre in Atlantic City, New Jersey, which opened as Nixon's Apollo Theatre in April 1908. It was soon the leading theater in the city, attracting fashionable audiences from New York and Philadelphia. Nixon's son Fredrick G Nixon Nirdlinger became a partner in the Nixon & Zimmerman theatrical firm. He managed the Park Theatre and People's Theatre in Philadelphia. An Associated Press story distributed in December 1903 said "…Samuel F. Nixon Nirdlinger is today the richest and most powerful theatrical manager and promoter in America…. His son, Frederick G. Nixon Nirdlinger, is an assistant to his father, and has won (his own) fame in his profession…"

Marcus Loew developed a growing chain of vaudeville theaters. They competed with the agency run by Fred G. Nixon-Nirdlinger, who filed a complaint with the U.S. Department of Justice alleging that Loew and others had established a virtual monopoly of the vaudeville business. The "Philadelphia Vaudeville War" continued until an agreement was struck on December 13, 1913, by which Loew gave up his holdings in the Metropolitan Opera House and Chestnut Street Opera House, and in exchange gained a stake in a new company being formed by Benjamin Franklin Keith. Samuel F. Nixon, Fred Nixon-Nirdlinger, J. Fred Zimmerman and Edward Franklin Albee were parties to the agreement.

Samuel F. Nixon died on November 13, 1918, in Philadelphia, Pennsylvania.

Fred G. Nixon-Nirdlinger was living in an apartment on the French Riviera in 1931 when he was shot and killed by his wife, Charlotte. Their infant children were present in the apartment. The sensational story of the murder and subsequent trial, in which Charlotte was acquitted on the grounds of self-defense, made headlines for months.
