= You Can't Take It with You (play) =

Comedic play by George S. Kaufman and Moss Hart

- Original language: English
- Written by: George S. Kaufman; Moss Hart
- Characters: Penelope Sycamore; Essie Carmichael; Rheba; Paul Sycamore; Mr. De Pinna; Ed Carmichael; Donald; Martin Vanderhof; Alice Sycamore; Wilbur C. Henderson; Anthony ‘Tony’ Kirby Jr. Boris Kolenkhov; Gay Wellington; Anthony Kirby Sr; Miriam Kirby; G-Men (FBI Agents): The Man; Jim; Mac; Olga Katrina (Grand Dutchess)
- Subject
- Genre: Comedy
- Setting: New York City at the home of Martin Vanderhof in 1936

Premiere
- Date: November 30, 1936
- Place: Chestnut Street Opera House; Philadelphia, Pennsylvania, U.S.

You Can't Take It with You is a comedic play in three acts by George S. Kaufman and Moss Hart. The original production of the play premiered at the Chestnut Street Opera House in Philadelphia, on November 30, 1936. The production then transferred to Broadway's Booth Theatre on December 14, 1936, where it played for 838 performances.

The play won the 1937 Pulitzer Prize for Drama, and was adapted for the screen as You Can't Take It with You in 1938, which won the Academy Award for Best Picture and Best Director.

The play is popular among theater programs of high school institutions, and has been one of the 10 most-produced school plays every year since amateur rights became available in 1939.

== Plot ==
=== Act One ===
The story takes place entirely in the home of the Sycamores, a slightly odd New York City family.

Grandpa Vanderhof, the family patriarch, is a whimsical old man who keeps pet snakes and hasn’t worked a day in thirty-five years. His daughter, Penny, is a writer of racy melodrama plays. Penny’s husband, Paul Sycamore, manufactures fireworks in the basement with the help of his assistant, Mr. De Pinna, who used to be the family's iceman. Paul and Penny have two daughters: Essie, a candy maker who dreams of being a ballerina, even though she is a terrible dancer, and Alice, an office worker who is relatively “normal” compared to the rest of the family. Also living in the house are Essie’s husband Ed Carmichael, the family’s maid Rheba, and her boyfriend Donald, who works as the family’s handyman.

Essie tells Grandpa that some letters have arrived for him from the United States Government, but that she misplaced them. Shortly afterwards, Alice comes home and announces that she has fallen in love with Tony Kirby, vice-president of Kirby & Co. and the son of her boss. Alice tells her family that Tony will be coming over shortly to take her on a date and goes upstairs to change clothes.

The doorbell rings. Penny answers the door and greets the visitor, thinking he must be Tony. The man at the door clarifies that his name is Wilbur C. Henderson, and he is investigating Grandpa for his evasion of income tax for the last twenty-four years. Grandpa refuses to pay, stating he never believed in it, and that the government would not know what to do with the money if he did pay it, angering Henderson. Henderson spots Grandpa's pet snakes and flees the house in fear, but not before promising Grandpa that he will be hearing from the United States government.

The real Tony Kirby arrives, and Alice is nervous that her family will scare him away. As they attempt to leave for their date, Mr. Boris Kolenkhov, Essie's eccentric Russian ballet instructor, arrives and complains to the family about the Revolution. During this discussion, Alice and Tony make their escape. The rest of the family sit down for dinner.

Later that night, Tony and Alice return to the Sycamore house. They are deeply in love, but Tony’s attempts to propose are repeatedly interrupted by the various members of the family. Finally, Tony and Alice become engaged to marry.

=== Act Two ===
Several days later, Alice has invited Tony and his parents over for dinner the next evening. Alice implores her family to act as normal as possible to make a good impression.

Penny has brought actress Gay Wellington over to read over her latest play, but Gay becomes very drunk and passes out on the living room couch. Essie asks Ed to help deliver her candies around the neighborhood, but he is reluctant as he believes he was followed the last time. Mr. De Pinna comes up from the cellar carrying a painting that Penny had started of him as a discus thrower. He asks Penny to finish it and she agrees. She puts on her painting smock and Mr. De Pinna puts on a toga costume. Mr. Kolenkhov arrives and begins Essie's ballet lesson. Ed provides accompanying music on the xylophone. Rheba runs in and out of the kitchen cleaning.

In the midst of the chaos, Tony, having forgotten for which night the dinner was planned, appears in the doorway with Mr. and Mrs. Kirby. Alice is incredibly embarrassed. Penny tells Alice not to worry, and insists that the Kirbys stay for dinner. Grandpa tries to keep the party under control for the sake of his granddaughter. Mr. Kirby, a straitlaced businessman, is unamused by Paul’s childish interests. Mrs. Kirby mentions her passion for spiritualism, which Penny derides. During a discussion of hobbies, Mr. Kolenkhov brings up that the Romans' hobby was wrestling, and demonstrates by throwing Mr. Kirby to the floor, angering him.

To break the tension, Penny suggests they play a free association game and instructs everyone to write down "the first thing that pops into their heads" after she says certain words. The game seems to lighten the mood at first, but soon sparks an argument between Mr. and Mrs. Kirby after her answers reveal dissatisfaction with their sex life due to Mr. Kirby’s preoccupation with his work. Mr. and Mrs. Kirby order Tony to leave with them immediately, but he refuses. A humiliated Alice decides that their marriage will never work as their families are too different. She ends their engagement and resigns from her job.

Before the Kirbys can leave, a group of government agents raid the house. The head G-man tells them that they are all under arrest, and reveals that Ed's notes from the candy boxes, on which he has printed anything that "sounds nice", have threatening and communist phrases written on them such as "DYNAMITE THE CAPITOL" and "GOD IS THE STATE, THE STATE IS GOD".

The agents drag Mr. De Pinna out of the basement and report the discovery of massive amounts of gunpowder to the head G-man. De Pinna tries to explain to the agent that he has left his lit pipe downstairs, but is ignored. Another agent brings down the deliriously drunk Gay Wellington from upstairs. The fireworks in the basement go off, lit by the untended pipe, and everyone panics, leaving the whole house in an uproar.

=== Act Three ===
The next day, Donald and Rheba sit in the kitchen reading the paper, where the arrests have made headlines because of Mr. Kirby's presence. Both families have been released after spending the night in jail. A distraught Alice has decided to leave for a prolonged trip to the Adirondack Mountains to think things over. When the family forgets to call for a cab, she finally loses her temper, angered that her family cannot be "normal" at all. Tony arrives and tries to reason with Alice, but she refuses him.

Mr. Kolenkhov appears with the Grand Duchess Olga Katrina. After discussing the sad fate of former Russian royalty now working menial jobs in New York, the Grand Duchess insists upon going into the kitchen to cook the dinner for the family.

Mr. Kirby arrives to pick up Tony, and they get into a heated argument. Tony reveals that he had purposely brought his parents on the wrong night because he wanted his parents to see the Sycamores authentically. He expresses admiration for the love the Sycamores have for one another compared to his emotionally distant father. Grandpa tells Mr. Kirby that he is happy not to be working and posits that Mr. Kirby doesn’t really enjoy his Wall Street job. Tony admits that he found letters Mr. Kirby had written to his own father, expressing desires to be a trapeze artist and later a saxophone player. Grandpa tells Mr. Kirby that he should enjoy his life while he can. Tony agrees, deciding to leave the family business to find his own path in life, and Mr. Kirby finally gives in, giving his blessing to Alice and Tony’s engagement, which Alice accepts.

Essie brings another letter to Grandpa from the government stating that he no longer owes them income tax. Grandpa reveals that he had tricked the IRS by claiming he was Martin Vanderhof Jr., and that the Martin Vanderhof they were looking for was his deceased father. This is corroborated because the milkman, who had lived with them prior to Mr. De Pinna, was buried under Grandpa’s name since the family never knew his real name.

The play comes to a conclusion as the family, along with Tony and Mr. Kirby, sit down to dinner with the Grand Duchess. Grandpa says a touching prayer, and then they dive into the food.

== Characters ==
Penelope Sycamore
Usually goes by Penny, Penelope is the mother of Essie and Alice, wife of Paul, and daughter of Martin. She writes plays and paints as hobbies because it makes her happy, but is terrible at both. Penny is a loving mother and wife who is constantly concerned with the welfare of her family. Her main goal is to make sure everyone is happy, particularly her daughter Alice. She is a main character.
Essie Carmichael
Wife of Ed, daughter of Penny and Paul Sycamore, Granddaughter of Martin, sister of Alice. She is childlike. As a hobby she makes candy that Ed sells. Essie dreams of being a ballerina. She has spent 8 years studying with Boris Kolenkhov, but is a terrible dancer.
Rheba
The African-American maid and cook to the Sycamore family. She is treated almost like a part of the family. She is dating Donald. In the words of Mrs. Sycamore, "The two of them are really cute together, something like Porgy and Bess."
Paul Sycamore
Father of Essie and Alice, husband of Penny, son-in-law of Martin. He is a tinkerer who manufactures fireworks in the basement with the help of his assistant Mr. De Pinna. His hobby is playing with erector sets.
Mr. De Pinna
The ice man who came inside to speak to Paul eight years before, and never left. He helps Mr. Sycamore build fireworks, and moonlights as a model in Mrs. Sycamore's paintings.
Ed Carmichael
Husband of Essie, son-in-law of Paul and Penny. He is a xylophone player, and distributes Essie's candies. Ed is an amateur printer who prints anything that sounds 'catchy' to him. He prints up dinner menus for his family and communist pamphlets that he places in the boxes of Essie's candy. He also likes to make masks.
Donald Curry
The African-American boyfriend of Rheba, who seems to serve as volunteer handyman for the Sycamores.
Martin Vanderhof
Referred to mostly as Grandpa in the play. Father-in-law to Paul, father of Penny, grandfather of Alice and Essie. He is an eccentric happy old man who has never paid his income tax because he does not believe in it, as he feels that the government would not know what to do with the money if he paid it. Once a very successful businessman, he left his job 35 years prior for no reason other than to just relax. He lives his life by the philosophy "don't do anything that you're not going to enjoy doing". He goes to circuses, commencements, throws darts, and collects stamps. He is a main character.
Alice Sycamore
Fiancée of Tony Kirby, daughter of Paul and Penny, granddaughter of Martin, sister of Essie. She is the only "normal" member of the extended family. She has an office job, and is rather embarrassed by the eccentricities of her family when she has Tony and his parents at her house, yet she still loves them. She tends to be a pessimist.
Wilbur C. Henderson
An employee of the IRS. He comes to collect the tax money owed by Grandpa, and cannot understand why the latter will not pay income tax.
Tony Kirby
Fiancé of Alice, son of Mr. and Mrs. Kirby. He sees how, even though the Sycamores appear odd, they are really the perfect family because they love and care about each other. His own family is very proper and has many issues none of them will admit. He is vice president of Kirby and Co.
Boris Kolenkhov
A Russian who escaped to America shortly before the Russian Revolution. He is very concerned with world politics, and the deterioration of Russia. He is the ballet instructor of Essie, aware that she is untalented at dancing, but knows that she enjoys dancing so he keeps working with her. He admires the ancient Greeks and the Romans, questions society, and is interested in world affairs.
Gay Wellington
An actress whom Mrs. Sycamore meets on a bus and invites home to read one of her plays. She is an alcoholic, gets very drunk, and passes out shortly after arriving at the Sycamore's home.
Anthony W. Kirby
Husband of Mrs. Kirby, father of Tony. He is a very proper man who is president of Kirby and Co. and secretly despises his job. His hobby is raising expensive orchids. He is also a member of the Harvard Society, the Union Club, the National Geographic Society, and the Racquet Club.
Miriam Kirby
Wife of Mr. Kirby, mother of Tony. She is an extremely prim and proper woman and is horrified by the goings-on in the Sycamore household. Her hobby is spiritualism.
G-Man 1 (The Man), G-Man 2 (Jim), G-Man 3 (Mac)
Three agents who come to investigate Ed because of the communist origin of some of the 'catchy' quotes he printed and placed in Essie's candy boxes, such as "God is the State – the State is God" and "Dynamite the White House".
The Grand Duchess Olga Katrina
She was one of the Grand Duchesses of Russia before the Revolution, another being her sister, the Grand Duchess Natasha. Since then she has been forced to flee to America where she has found work as a waitress in Childs Restaurant. The rest of her family has had a similar fate, such as her Uncle Sergei, the Grand Duke, who is now an elevator operator. She loves to cook as a hobby.

== Productions ==
The play premiered at the Chestnut Street Opera House in Philadelphia on November 30, 1936. The production transferred to Broadway at the Booth Theatre on December 14, 1936, and ran there until September 3, 1938; it transferred to the Imperial Theatre, running from September 5, 1938, to October 29, 1938, and finally transferred to the Ambassador Theatre from October 31, 1938, to December 3, 1938, for a total of 838 performances. George S. Kaufman was the director.

The play was revived on Broadway with a production opening at the Plymouth Theatre on April 4, 1983, to December 10, 1983, and transferring to the Royale Theatre from December 13, 1983, to January 1, 1984, for a total of 312 performances. Directed by Ellis Rabb, the cast starred Jason Robards as Martin Vanderhof, Colleen Dewhurst as Olga, James Coco as Boris Kolenkhov and Elizabeth Wilson as Penelope Sycamore.

A 1985 revival starred Eddie Albert as Grandpa Vanderhof, Eva Gabor as Grand Duchess Olga Katrina and Jack Dodson as Paul Sycamore.

A two-act version was staged at the Royal Exchange Theatre Manchester from December 2011 to January 2012. It received excellent reviews and played to packed houses throughout.

A revival opened on Broadway at the Longacre Theater on August 26, 2014 (previews) and on September 28, 2014 (officially). Directed by Scott Ellis, the cast starred James Earl Jones as Martin Vanderhof, Rose Byrne as Alice Sycamore, Elizabeth Ashley as The Grand Duchess Olga, Annaleigh Ashford as Essie Carmichael (a role which earned her a Tony Award for Featured Actress in a Play), Johanna Day as Mrs. Kirby, Julie Halston as Gay Wellington, Byron Jennings as Mr. Kirby, Mark Linn-Baker as Paul Sycamore, Crystal Dickinson as Rheba, Patrick Kerr as Mr. De Pinna, Will Brill as Ed, Marc Damon Johnson as Donald Curry, Reg Rogers as Boris Kolenkhov, Fran Kranz as Tony Kirby, Kristine Nielsen as Penelope Sycamore, Karl Kenzler as Henderson, and the G-Men played by Nick Corley, Austin Durant, and Joe Tapper. Understudies include Corley, Barrett Doss, Durant, Ned Noyes, Pippa Pearthree, Tapper, and Charles Turner.

== Film, radio and TV adaptations ==
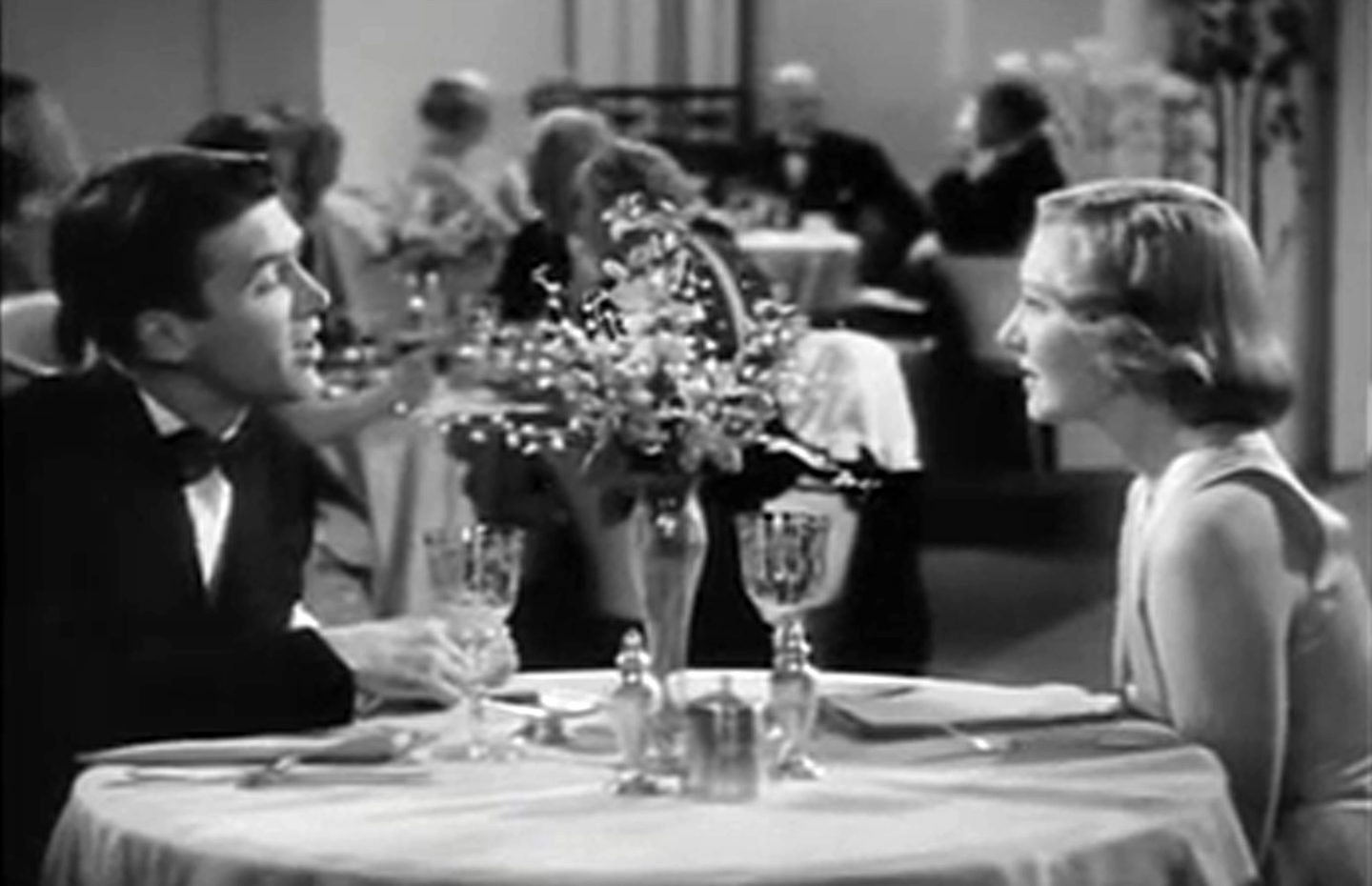
James Stewart and Jean Arthur in You Can't Take It With You (1938)

The play was the basis for the 1938 film directed by Frank Capra. The film cast included James Stewart, Jean Arthur, Lionel Barrymore, Edward Arnold, Spring Byington, Ann Miller, Dub Taylor, Charles Lane, Mischa Auer, Eddie 'Rochester' Anderson, and the uncredited Arthur Murray. It was awarded the Academy Award for Best Picture and Best Director of 1938. The film version has the same overall plot and themes as the play but includes new scenes, dialogue, and slightly different characterizations, such as a side plot about Kirby Sr.'s attempt to acquire the Vanderhof house for a real estate development, and removed the side plot of Grand Duchess Olga Katrina.

Two short-lived radio series based on the play aired in 1944 and 1951. The 1944 series, with Everett Sloane as Grandpa Vanderhof, ran on the Mutual network from August 27 to November 19 of that year. The 1951 series, with Walter Brennan as Grandpa, ran on the NBC network from May 13 to November 16 of that year.

CBS produced a notable television adaptation of the original play in 1979. It featured Art Carney as Grandpa, along with Jean Stapleton, Beth Howland, Blythe Danner, Robert Mandan, Harry Morgan, Barry Bostwick, Kenneth Mars, Howard Hesseman and Polly Holliday. A second television adaptation was produced in 1984 by Public Broadcasting Service. This version, featuring Jason Robards as Grandpa, was based on the Broadway revival and filmed at Royale Theatre, New York City and was included in Great Performances (November 21, 1984).

A syndicated situation comedy based on the play, produced by NBC, ran in the United States during the 1987–1988 season. Harry Morgan, who had played Mr. De Pinna in the 1979 telefilm, appeared in the series as Grandpa.

== Awards and nominations ==
=== Original Broadway production ===
Year	Award	Category	Nominee	Result
1937	Pulitzer Prize	Drama	George S. Kaufman; Moss Hart	Won

=== 1965 Broadway revival ===
Year	Award	Category	Nominee	Result
1966	Tony Award	Best Direction of a Play	Ellis Rabb	Nominated

=== 1983 Broadway revival ===
Year	Award	Category	Nominee	Result
1983	Drama Desk Award	Outstanding Featured Actress in a Play	Maureen Anderman	Nominated

=== 2014 Broadway revival ===
Year	Award	Category	Nominee	Result
2015	Tony Award	Best Revival of a Play		Nominated
2015	Tony Award	Best Featured Actress in a Play	Annaleigh Ashford	Won
2015	Tony Award	Best Scenic Design of a Play	David Rockwell	Nominated
2015	Tony Award	Best Costume Design of a Play	Jane Greenwood	Nominated
2015	Tony Award	Best Direction of a Play	Scott Ellis	Nominated
2015	Drama Desk Award	Outstanding Featured Actress in a Play	Annaleigh Ashford	Won
2015	Drama Desk Award	Outstanding Featured Actress in a Play	Julie Halston	Nominated
