= Marc Klaw =

American lawyer and theatrical producer (1858–1936)

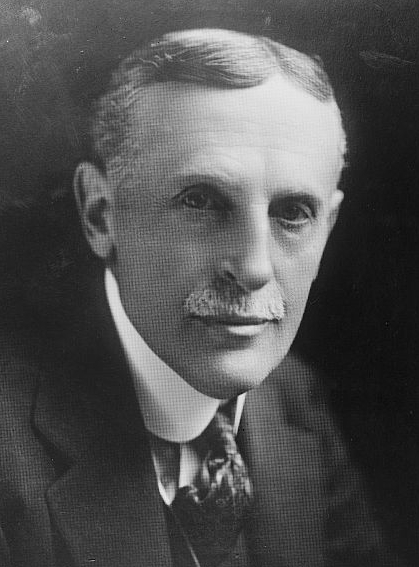
- Born: Marcus Alonzo Klaw; May 29, 1858
- Died: June 14, 1936 (aged 78)
- Occupation: Theater producer

Marc Klaw (born Marcus Alonzo Klaw, May 29, 1858 – June 14, 1936) was an American lawyer, theatrical producer, theater owner, and a leading figure of the Theatrical Syndicate.

== Life and work ==
Referred to as both Mark and Marc, he was born in Paducah, Kentucky, the child of Jewish immigrants from Germany. He studied law at Louisville Law School, graduating in 1879. He established a law practice in Louisville, and worked as a part-time drama critic.

In 1881 he moved to New York City to work on legal issues regarding the theater for theater executive Gustave Frohman. Klaw was drawn to the theater business, and for several years was a manager of tours. He formed a partnership with A. L. "Abe" Erlanger that started as a theatrical booking agency in New York City in 1888.

Operating as "Klaw & Erlanger" they expanded their business through the acquisition and construction of theaters, to the point where they controlled most of the theaters in the U.S. South and several major locations in New York. Among their holdings were they owned "Klaw and Erlanger's Costume Company" and the "Klaw & Erlanger Opera Company."

By 1895 Klaw & Erlanger were the second-largest booking company in the US.

In 1896, Klaw & Erlanger joined with Al Hayman, Charles Frohman, Samuel F. Nixon, and J. Fred Zimmerman to form the "Theatrical Syndicate". Their organization established systemized booking networks throughout the US and created a monopoly that controlled every aspect of contracts and bookings until the late 1910s when the Shubert brothers broke their hold on the industry.

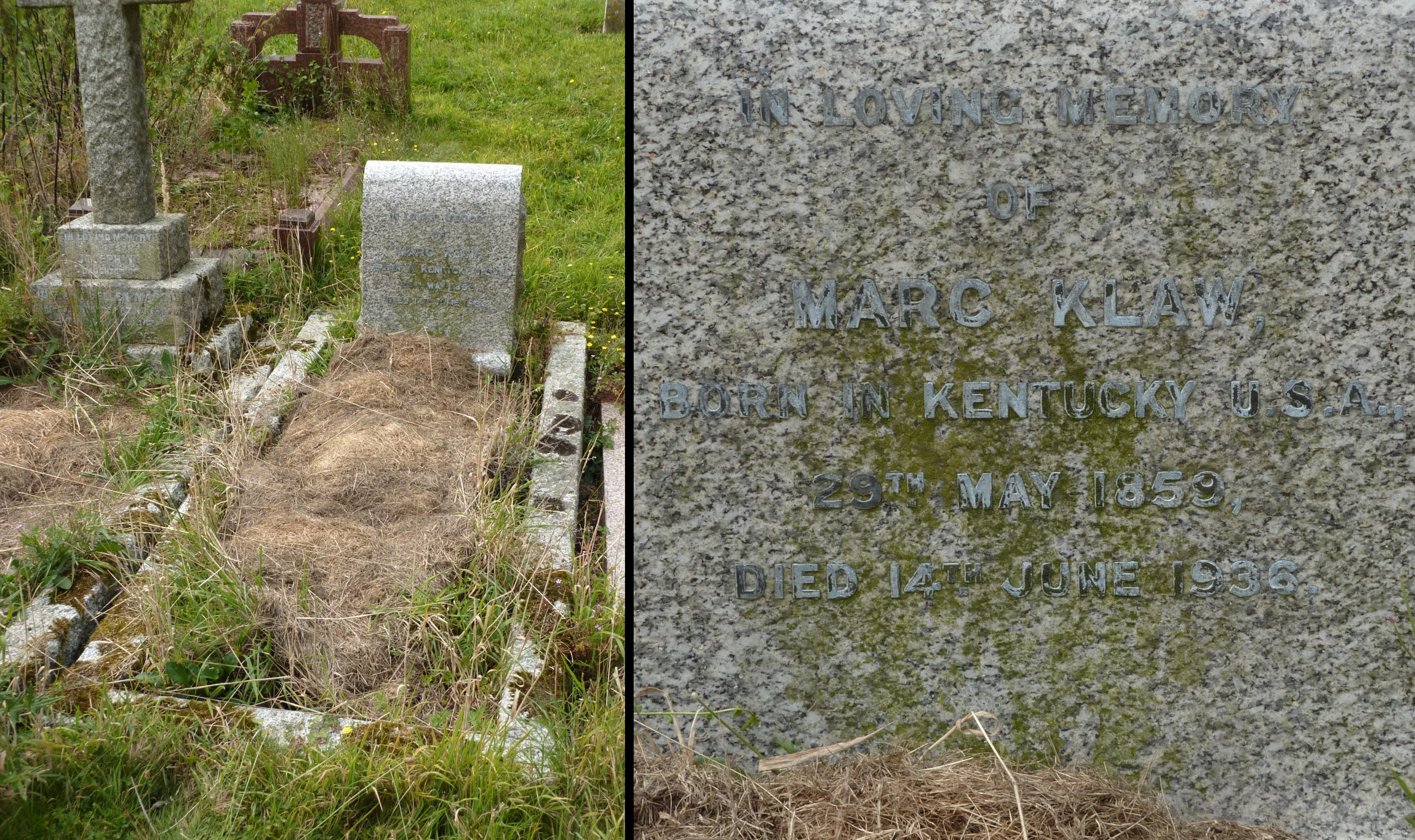
Klaw's grave at St John the Baptist's Church, Clayton, England, photographed in 2014. The date of birth is inscribed as 1859

Despite being nearly universally despised in the industry for their ruthless tactics, Klaw and Erlanger produced dozens of Broadway plays and financed many others including the early editions of the Ziegfeld Follies.

The partnership of Klaw & Erlanger was hurt as a result of the Actors' Equity strike of 1919. The partnership ended in 1919, and the last Broadway production by "Klaw and Erlanger" was in 1919 (The Velvet Lady). After that, Klaw built the Klaw Theatre and produced plays until his retirement in 1927.

== Later years ==
After his retirement, in 1929 Klaw moved to England, where he died in 1936 at Bracken Fell, Hassocks, West Sussex. He is buried in the churchyard of St John the Baptist's Church, Clayton.
