= Charles Frohman =

American theater manager and producer (1856–1915)

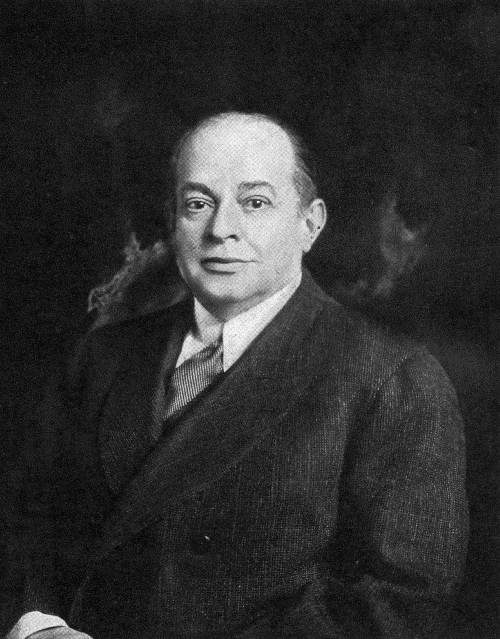
- Frohman in 1914
- Born: July 15, 1856; Sandusky, Ohio, U.S.
- Died: May 7, 1915 (aged 58); RMS Lusitania, Atlantic Ocean
- Occupations: Theatre manager and producer
- Relatives: Daniel Frohman (brother); Gustave Frohman (brother); Philip H. Frohman (nephew)

Charles Frohman (July 15, 1856 – May 7, 1915) was an American theater manager and producer, who discovered and promoted many stars of the American stage. Frohman produced over 700 shows, and among his biggest hits was Peter Pan, both in London and the US.

In 1896, Frohman co-founded the Theatrical Syndicate, a nationwide chain of theaters that dominated the American touring company business for more than two decades until the Shubert brothers grew strong enough to end its virtual monopoly. He partnered with English producers, including Seymour Hicks, with whom he produced a string of London hits prior to 1910, such as Quality Street, The Admirable Crichton, The Catch of the Season, The Beauty of Bath, and A Waltz Dream.

At the height of his fame, Frohman died in the 1915 sinking of the RMS Lusitania by a German submarine off the coast of Ireland.

== Life and career ==
Charles Frohman was born to a Jewish family in Sandusky, Ohio, the youngest of three Frohman brothers, including Daniel and Gustave. The year of his birth date is generally erroneously reported as 1860, and his birthday is shown as July 16 on his tombstone, but the correct date is July 15, 1856. In 1864, Frohman's family moved to New York City.

At the age of twelve, Frohman started to work at night in the office of the New York Tribune, attending school by day. In 1874, he began work for the Daily Graphic and at night sold tickets at Hooley's Theatre, Brooklyn. In 1877, he took charge of the Chicago Comedy Co., with John Dillon as star in Our Boys. He next joined Haverly's United Mastodon Minstrels as manager, touring the U.S. and Europe. Then for a time he was associated with his brothers Daniel and Gustave in managing the Madison Square Theatre, New York. He began to produce plays by 1886.

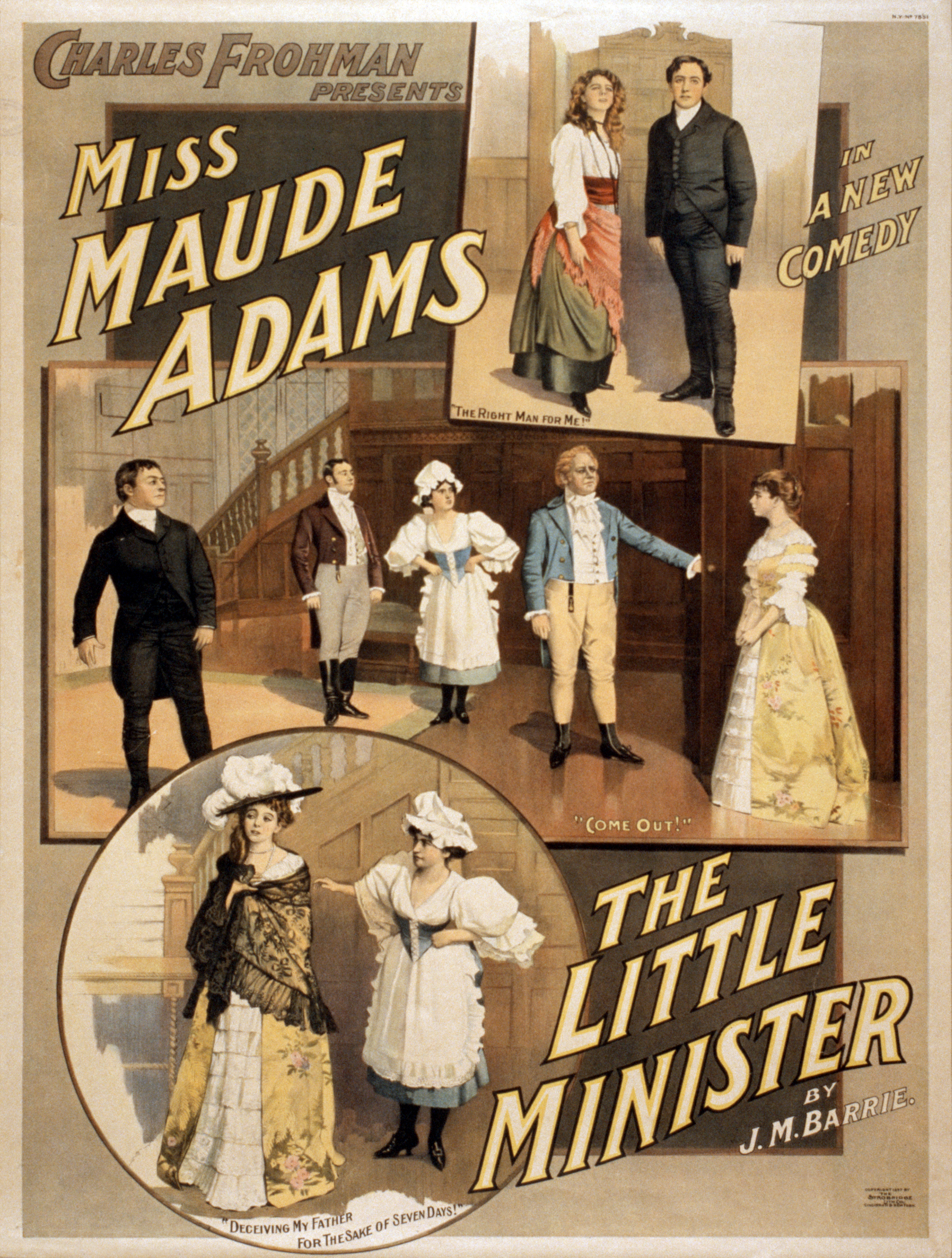
Charles Frohman presents Miss Maude Adams in The Little Minister, by J. M. Barrie

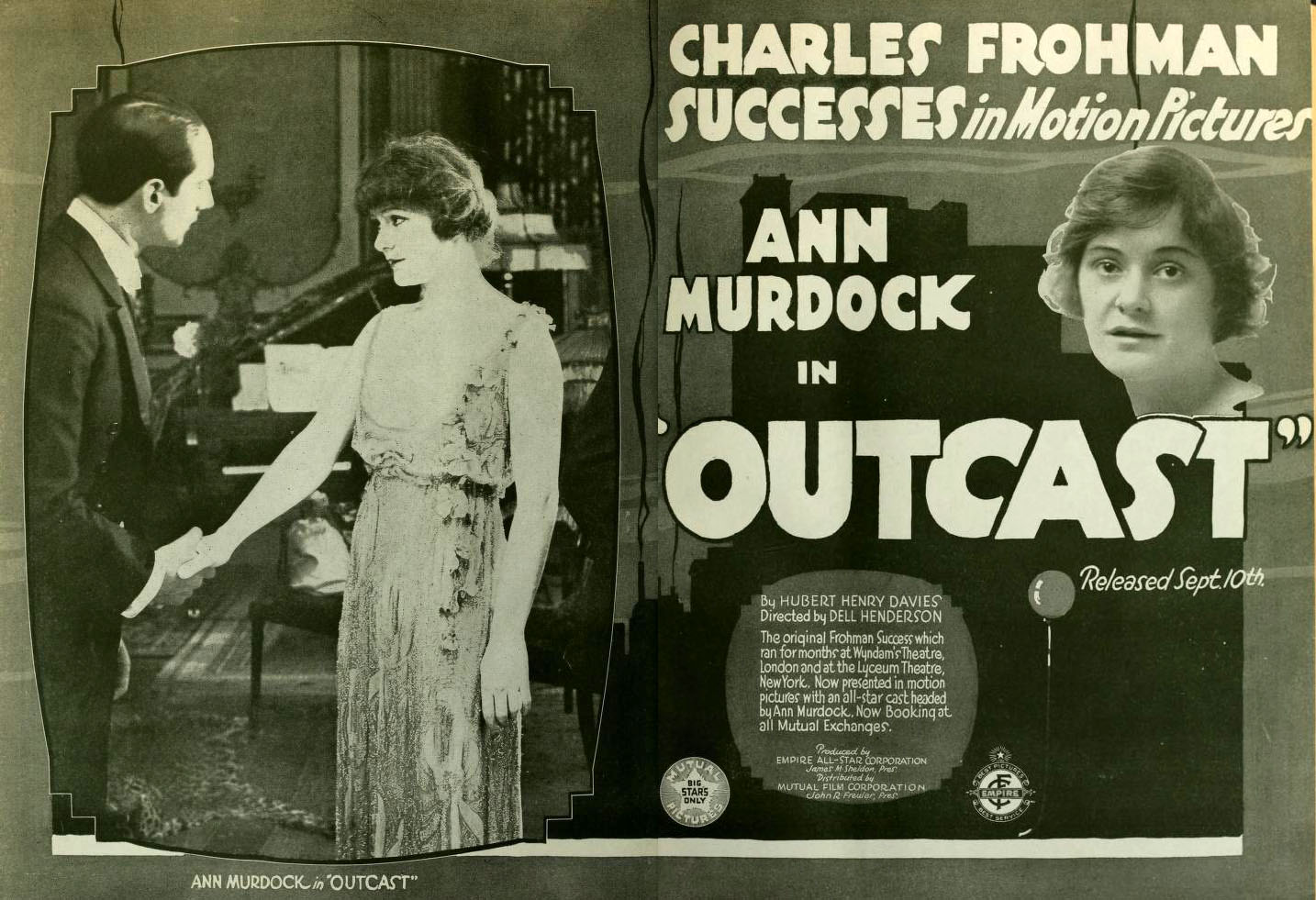
The Outcast (1917)

Frohman's first success as a producer was with Bronson Howard's play Shenandoah (1889). Frohman founded the Empire Theatre Stock Company to acquire his first Broadway theatre, the Empire, in 1892. The following year, he produced his first Broadway play, Clyde Fitch's Masked Ball. In this piece, Maude Adams first played opposite John Drew, which led to many future successes. Soon Frohman acquired five other New York City theaters, including the Garrick and Criterion Theatres. Working with William Harris and Isaac B. Rich, he became part owner of their theatres in Boston (the Columbia Theatre, Park, Hollis Street, Colonial, Boston and Tremont). In 1895, he produced the New York premiere of The Importance of Being Earnest, by Oscar Wilde. The same year, he produced The Shop Girl.

Frohman was known for his ability to develop talent. His stars included William Gillette, John Drew, Jr., Ethel Barrymore, Billie Burke, E. H. Sothern, Julia Marlowe, Maude Adams, Paul Gilmore, Evelyn Millard, Henry Miller and Walter E. Perkins. In 1896, Frohman, Al Hayman, Abe Erlanger, Mark Klaw, Samuel F. Nixon, and Fred Zimmerman formed the Theatrical Syndicate. Their organization established systemized booking networks throughout the United States and created a monopoly that controlled every aspect of contracts and bookings until the late 1910s, when the Shubert brothers broke their stranglehold on the industry.

In 1897, Frohman leased the Duke of York's Theatre in London, introducing plays there as well as in the United States. Clyde Fitch, J. M. Barrie and Edmond Rostand were among the playwrights he promoted. As a producer, among Frohman's most famous successes was Barrie's Peter Pan, or The Boy Who Wouldn't Grow Up, which he premiered at the Duke of York's in December 1904 starring Nina Boucicault, and produced in January 1905 in the U.S. starring Maude Adams.

In the early years of the 20th century, Frohman also established a successful partnership with English actor-producer Seymour Hicks to produce musicals and other comedies in London, including Quality Street in 1902, The Admirable Crichton in 1903, The Catch of the Season in 1904, The Beauty of Bath in 1906, The Gay Gordons in 1907, and A Waltz Dream in 1908, among others. He also partnered with other London theatre managers. The system of exchange of successful plays between London and New York was effected largely as a result of his efforts. In 1910, Frohman attempted a repertory scheme of producing plays at the Duke of York's. He advertised a bill of plays by J. M. Barrie, John Galsworthy, Harley Granville Barker, and others. The venture began tentatively, and while it might have proved successful, Frohman canceled the scheme when London theatres closed at the death of King Edward VII in May 1910.

Other Frohman hits included The Dollar Princess (1909), The Arcadians (1910), The Sunshine Girl (1913) and The Girl From Utah (1914). By 1915, Frohman had produced more than 700 shows, employed an average of 10,000 people per season, 700 of them actors, and paid salaries totaling $35 million a year (the equivalent of more than $700 million in 2010 dollars). Frohman controlled five theaters in London, six in New York City, and over two hundred throughout the rest of the United States. His longtime live-in companion, theatre critic Charles Dillingham, also became a well-known producer.

== Death on the RMS Lusitania ==
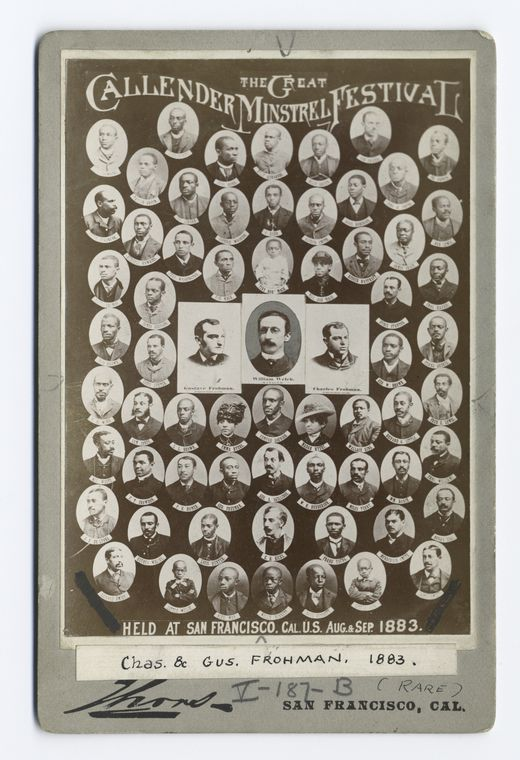
Frohman (center, right) as co-proprietor of the Callender Minstrels, 1883

Frohman made his annual trip to Europe in May 1915 to oversee his London and Paris "play markets", sailing on the Cunard Line's RMS Lusitania. Songwriter Jerome Kern was meant to accompany him on the voyage but overslept after being kept up late playing requests at a party. William Gillette was also to have accompanied him, but was forced to fulfill a contracted appearance in Philadelphia.

Frohman's rheumatic knee, from a fall three years earlier, had been ailing for most of the voyage, but he was feeling better on the morning of May 7, a bright, sunny day. He entertained guests in his suite and later at his table. He was regaling them with tales of his life in the theater when, at 2:10 in the afternoon, within fourteen miles of the Old Head of Kinsale, with the coast of Ireland in sight, a torpedo from the German U-boat U-20 struck the Lusitania on the starboard side. Within a minute, there was a second explosion, followed by several smaller ones.

As passengers began to panic, Frohman stood on the promenade deck, chatting with friends and smoking a cigar. He calmly remarked, "This is going to be a close call." Frohman, with a disabled leg and walking with a cane, could not have jumped from the deck into a lifeboat, so he was trapped. Instead, he and millionaire Alfred Vanderbilt tied lifejackets to "Moses baskets" containing infants who had been asleep in the nursery when the torpedo struck. Frohman then went out onto the deck, where he was joined by actress Rita Jolivet, her brother-in-law George Vernon and Captain Alick Scott. In the final moments, they clasped hands, and Frohman paraphrased his greatest hit, Peter Pan: "Why fear death? It is the most beautiful adventure that life gives us." Jolivet, the only survivor of Frohman's party, was standing with Frohman as the ship sank. She later said, "with a tremendous roar a great wave swept along the deck. We were all divided in a moment, and I have not seen any of those brave men alive since."

At his death, Frohman was 58. His body later washed ashore below the Old Head of Kinsale, and lay among 147 others awaiting identification, where a rescued American identified him from newspaper photographs. His body, alone among all the others, was not disfigured. It was determined that he was killed by a heavy object falling on him, rather than by drowning. His funeral service was held on May 25 at Temple Emanu-El in New York City, and he was buried in the Union Field Cemetery in Ridgewood, Queens, New York. Services were also arranged by some of his stars in other American cities: by Maude Adams in Los Angeles, by John Drew in San Francisco, by Billie Burke in Tacoma, and by Donald Brian, Joseph Cawthorn and Julia Sanderson in Providence, as well as memorial services at both St Paul's Cathedral and the Church of St Martin-in-the-Fields in London. Frohman was also eulogized by the French Academy of Authors in Paris.

A memorial to Frohman is located on The Causeway at Marlow on Thames. The memorial, by the artist Leonard Stanford Merrifield, features a drinking fountain with a sculptured nymph and inscription.

== Portrayals in films, television and stage ==
Frohman was portrayed by Edwin Maxwell in The Great Ziegfeld (1936) and by Harry Hayden in the film Till the Clouds Roll By (1946). He was played by William Hootkins in the BBC mini-series The Lost Boys in 1978. He was portrayed by Nehemiah Persoff in Ziegfeld: The Man and His Women also in 1978 on television. In the 1980 film Somewhere in Time, the character William Fawcett Robinson, played by Christopher Plummer, was based on Frohman. In 2004, Dustin Hoffman portrayed him in the film Finding Neverland, while Kelsey Grammer played him in the musical of the same name on Broadway in 2015.
