= A. L. Erlanger =

American theater manager (1859–1930)

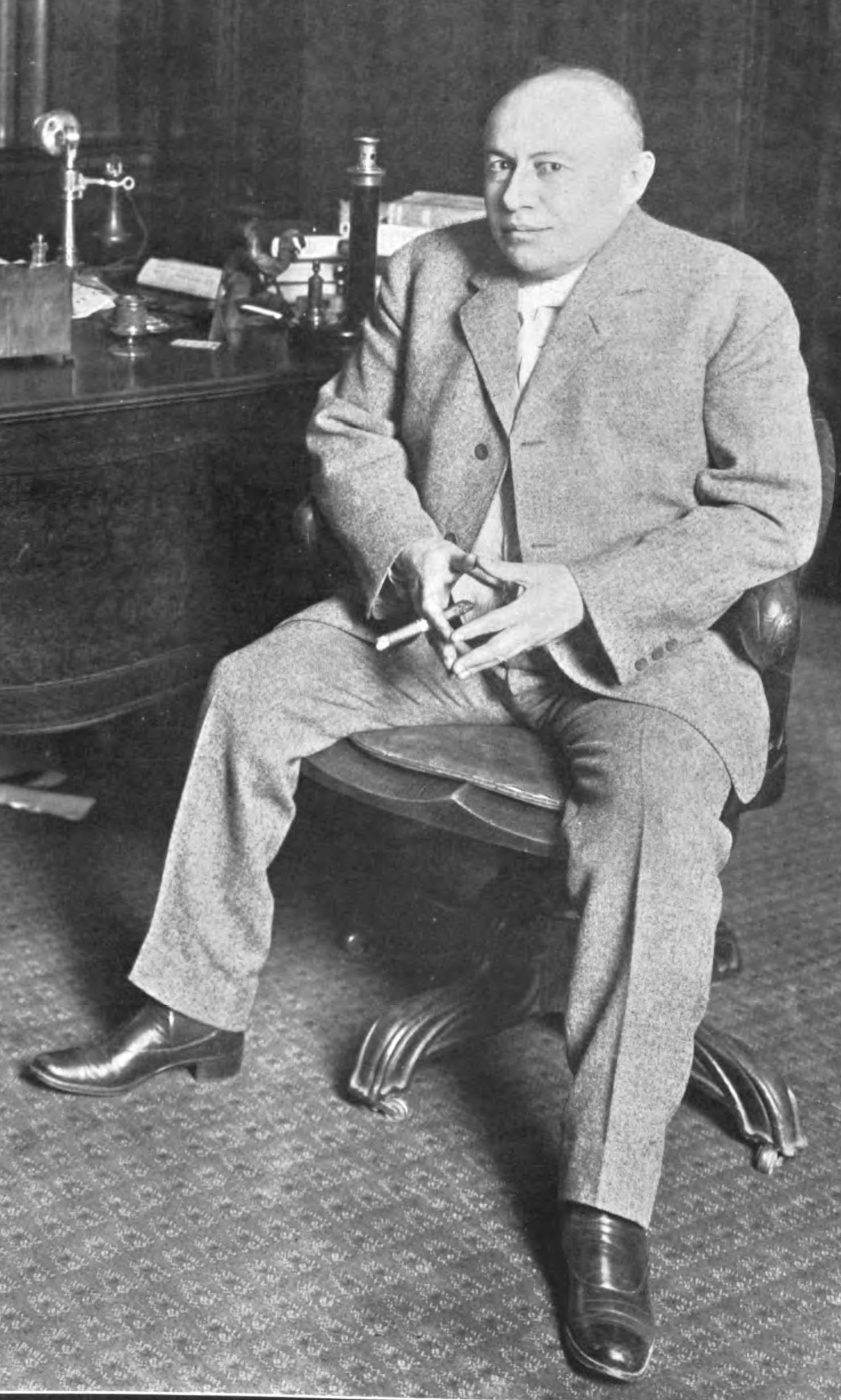
- Abraham Lincoln Erlanger 1909
- Born: Abraham Lincoln Erlanger; May 4, 1859; Buffalo, New York, U.S.
- Died: March 7, 1930 (aged 70); New York City, New York, U.S.
- Other name: Abe Erlanger
- Occupation: Theatre producer

Abraham Lincoln Erlanger (May 4, 1859 – March 7, 1930) was an American theatrical producer, director, designer, theater owner, and a leading figure of the Theatrical Syndicate.

== Biography ==
Erlanger was born to a Jewish family in Buffalo, New York. Erlanger and his partner, Kentucky lawyer Marc Klaw, started out as a theatrical booking agency in New York City in 1888. Immensely successful, together they built a large chain of theatres and vaudeville playhouses. In 1896, they joined with theatre operators Al Hayman, Charles Frohman, Samuel F. Nixon, and Fred Zimmerman to form the Theatrical Syndicate. Florenz Ziegfeld joined the Syndicate in 1906 but had produced plays for them before he joined. Their organization, known as "Klaw & Erlanger", established systemized booking networks throughout the United States and created a monopoly that controlled every aspect of contracts and bookings until the late 1910s when the Shubert brothers broke their hold on the industry.

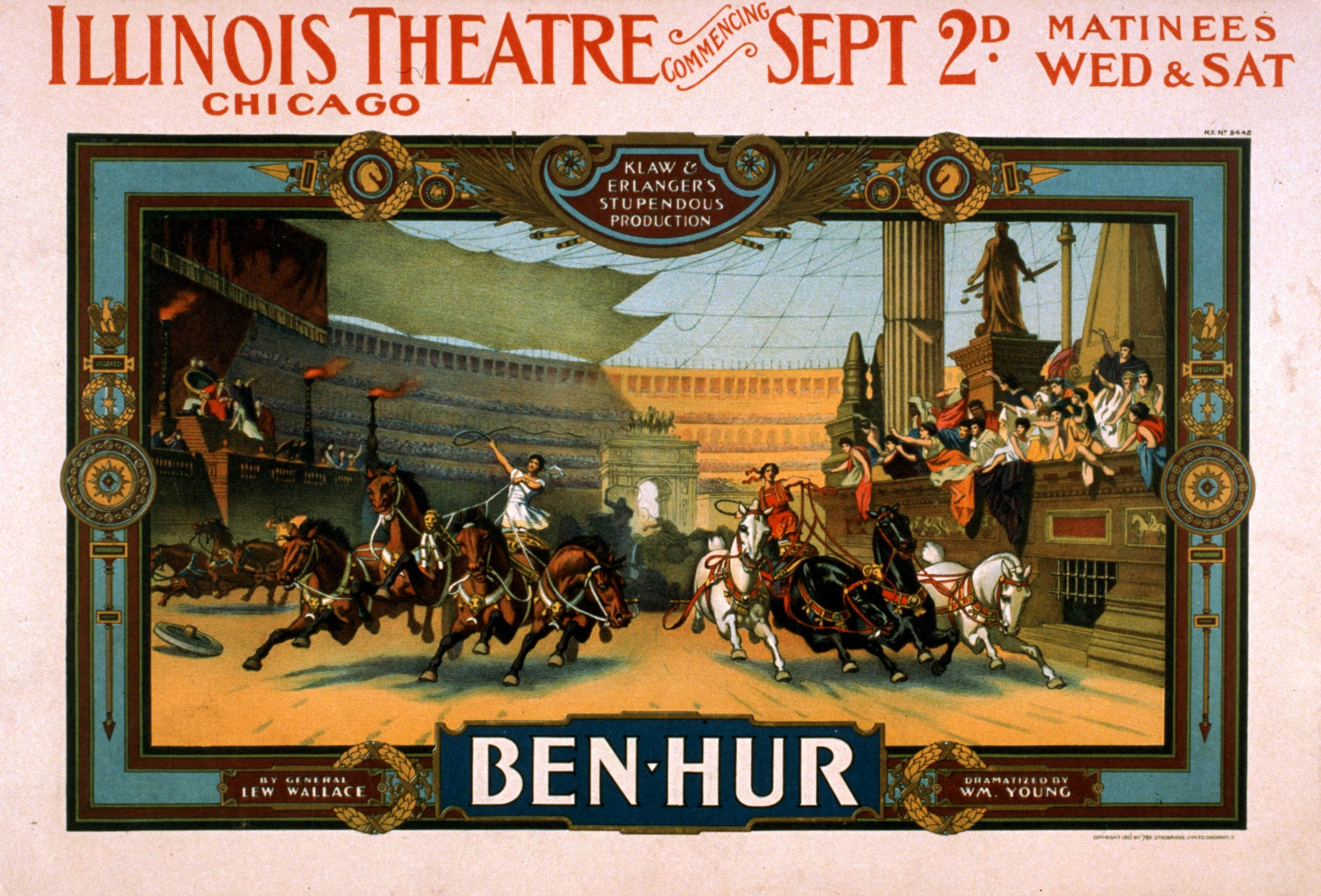
1901 poster for the representation of Ben Hur at the Illinois Theater of Chicago.

The operations of Klaw & Erlanger produced dozens of Broadway shows during the first three decades of the 20th century, including Dracula, Ben-Hur, and The Jazz Singer. They produced the first Ziegfeld Follies in 1907 at the rooftop "Jardin de Paris" in New York City. They also built several of Broadway's most outstanding theaters such as the Art Nouveau New Amsterdam Theatre in 1903 and in 1927 Erlanger's Theatre (renamed the St. James) plus the new Erlanger Theatre in Philadelphia. Also in 1927, he leased a newly built theatre in Buffalo, New York and applied the Erlanger name to it. In addition to playhouses, he and his partner owned the "Klaw & Erlanger Opera Company" and "Klaw and Erlanger's Costume Company."

Erlanger's cold disdain and ruthless tactics helped bring about his own downfall. He made a bitter enemy of the Shubert brothers after Sam Shubert died in a train wreck in 1905, when he is said to have refused to abide by any legal agreements "with a dead man." The enraged Shubert brothers Lee and Jacob began an all out campaign to wrestle power in the industry away from the Theatrical Syndicate. In 1910, he drew the ire of New York mayor William Jay Gaynor when one of his theaters hosted The Girl with the Whooping Cough, a risque farce that the mayor condemned as indecent. In 1919, after he dismissed out of hand the demands of the Actors' Equity Association, the labor union launched a strike that eventually shut down all the theatres in New York City, Chicago, and Boston. In the end, Erlanger suffered large financial losses and had no choice but to accede to union demands.

The strike spelled the demise of his once powerful organization and the partnership of Klaw & Erlanger produced their last Broadway show in 1919 (The Velvet Lady). Erlanger continued to produce on Broadway. He died on March 7, 1930. He is interred at Beth El Cemetery in Ridgewood, New York. Rumor of marriage.

Erlanger's brother was lawyer and New York Supreme Court Justice Mitchell L. Erlanger, who served as counsel for his brother's company and took it over upon Abraham's death.

== Former theatres ==
Theaters controlled by Erlanger included:

=== Broadway ===
- Erlanger Theatre
- Fulton Theatre
- Gaiety Theatre
- George M. Cohan's Theatre
- Knickerbocker Theatre
- Liberty Theatre
- Henry Miller's Theatre
- New Amsterdam Theatre
  - New Amsterdam Roof

=== Regional ===
- Erlanger Theatre (Atlanta)
- Colonial Theatre (Boston)
- Hollis Street Theatre (Boston)
- Tremont Theatre (Boston)
- Erlanger Theatre (Buffalo)
- Blackstone Theatre (Chicago)
- Erlanger Theatre (Chicago)
- Illinois Theatre (Chicago)
- Grand Opera House (Cincinnati)
- Biltmore Theatre (Los Angeles)
- Mason Theatre (Los Angeles)
- Crescent Theatre (New Orleans)
- Tulane Theatre (New Orleans)
- Erlanger Theatre (Philadelphia)
- Nixon Theatre (Pittsburgh)
- Metropolitan Theatre (Seattle)
- American Theatre (St. Louis)
