= J. Fred Zimmerman Sr. =

American theater owner and leader of the Theatrical Syndicate

- Born: John Frederick Zimmerman Sr. 1843
- Died: 1925 (aged 81–82)
- Occupation: Theater owner
- Known for: Theatrical Syndicate

John Frederick Zimmerman Sr. (1843–1925) was an American theater magnate. He was one of the members of the Theatrical Syndicate, which monopolized theatrical bookings in the United States for several years.

== Early years ==
Zimmerman was born in 1843, and began work in 1863 as an usher at the Chestnut Street Theater in Philadelphia. He became an advance agent for booking shows in theaters. Zimmerman and Samuel F. Nixon became partners in the Nixon & Zimmerman theatrical firm. The two started as lessees of theaters, and later became owners.

== Theater operations ==
Nixon and Zimmerman acquired the lease of the Walnut Street Theatre from the widow of George K. Goodwin, who died in the summer of 1881. Soon after she sold them the lease on the Chestnut Street Opera House. They already owned Haverly's, later called the Chestnut Street Theatre, and they now dominated the theater business in Philadelphia. By the mid-1890s Nixon and Zimmerman controlled the Broad, the Park, the Chestnut and the Chestnut Street Opera House, the four most important theaters in Philadelphia. They also owned first-class theaters in Pennsylvania, West Virginia and Ohio.

== Theatrical syndicate ==
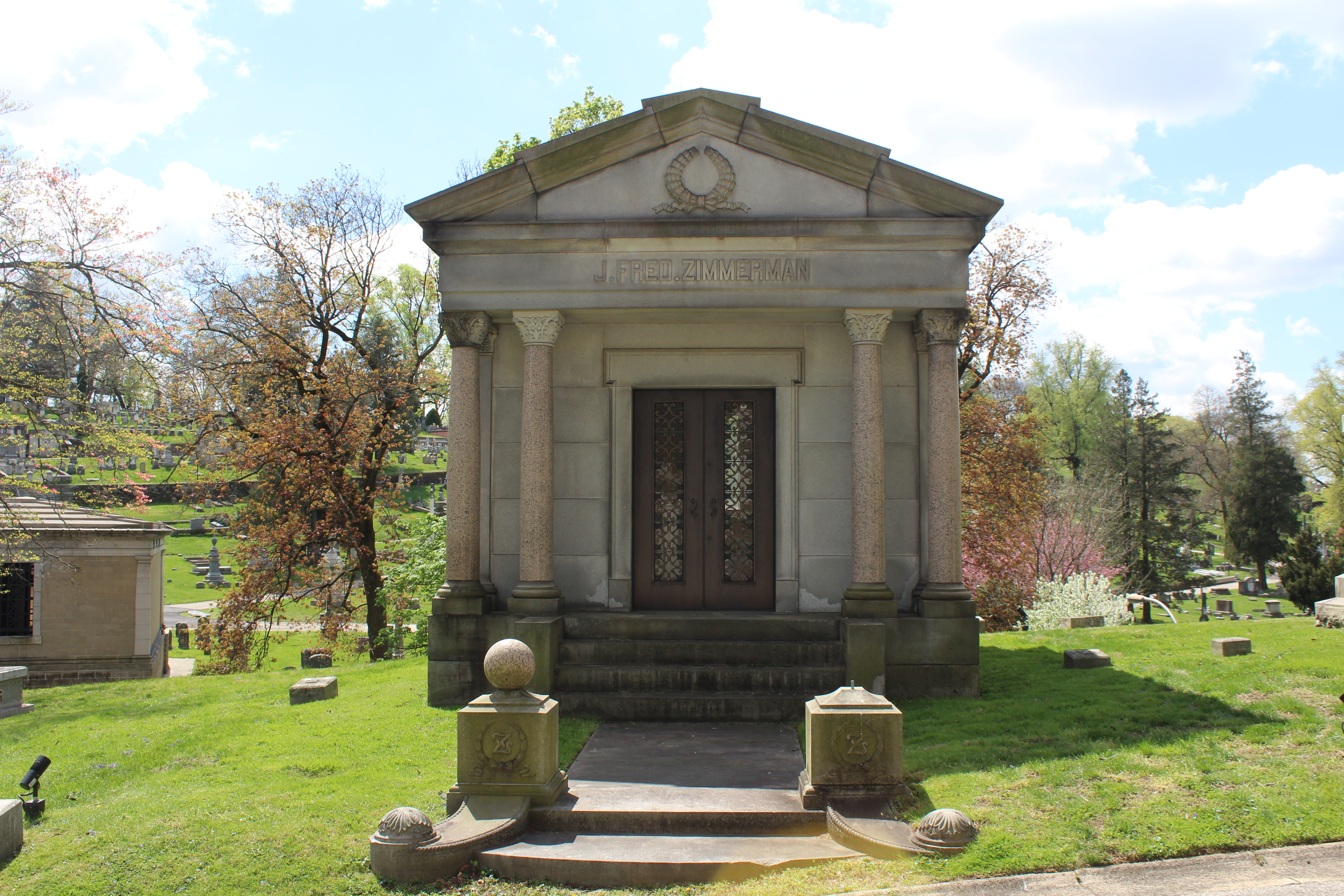
Zimmerman Family mausoleum in Laurel Hill Cemetery

In 1896 Zimmerman, Nixon, Al Hayman of San Francisco, Marcus Klaw, A. L. Erlanger, and Charles Frohman of New York joined to form the Theatrical Syndicate. This gave them an effective monopoly in the United States of bookings of travelling theatrical companies. The syndicate was organized as an informal pool rather than as a modern corporation, a relatively fragile structure that relied on trust and cooperation. Eventually the Shubert brothers broke the monopoly. The syndicate could not compete effectively with the more efficient corporate structure of the Shubert Organization. New competition also came from movies, an increasingly popular alternative to live shows.

Zimmerman's first wife was Vesta Howard Sawtelle (1868 - 1918). His second wife was Emma A Wetherell (1850 - 1903). He died in 1925 and was buried in the family crypt on "Millionaire's Row" at Laurel Hill Cemetery in Philadelphia. His son J. Fred Zimmerman Jr. continued in the family business.

== Productions ==
Zimmerman ran an opera company, mostly producing musicals, but also producing revivals of Erminie (1896) and The Lyons Mail (1906). In 1906 he produced Mauricette, Markheim and Paolo and Francesca. Productions by Zimmerman included:

- The Monks of Malabar (Musical, Comedy, Opera ) Sep 14, 1900 – Oct 20, 1900
- The Strollers (Musical, Comedy ) Jun 24, 1901 – Aug 31, 1901
- The Messenger Boy (Musical, Comedy ) Sep 16, 1901 – Jan 04, 1902
- The Toreador (Musical ) Jan 06, 1902 – May 3, 1902
- A Chinese Honeymoon (Musical, Comedy, Vaudeville ) Jun 02, 1902 – Apr 25, 1903
- The Runaways (Musical, Comedy, Extravaganza ) May 11, 1903 – Oct 17, 1903
- Erminie (Musical, Operetta, Revival) Oct 19, 1903 – Nov 28, 1903
- The Girl from Dixie (Musical, Comedy ) Dec 14, 1903 – Jan 02, 1904
- Winsome Winnie (Musical, Comedy ) Dec 01, 1903 – Jan 16, 1904
- Simple Simon Simple (Musical, Extravaganza ) Oct 30, 1905 – Nov 04, 1905
- Charles I (Play, Revival)
- King Rene's Daughter (Play, Revival)
- Markheim (Play )
- Mauricette (Play )
- Paolo and Francesca (Play )
- The Lyons Mail (Play, Revival)
