= Theatrical Syndicate =

Former American monopoly

Starting in 1896, the Theatrical Syndicate was an organization in the United States that controlled the majority of bookings in the country's leading theatrical attractions. The six-man group was in charge of theatres and bookings. The Syndicate's power would peak in 1907.

== Beginnings ==
Charles Frohman, Al Hayman, A. L. Erlanger, Marc Klaw, Samuel F. Nirdlinger (Nixon), and Frederick Zimmerman met for lunch at the Holland House in New York City in the early months of 1896. All of them were theatrical managers or booking agents with national influence. Frohman and Hayman owned theatres in New York and the surrounding area, Erlanger and Klaw worked as booking agents for practically all of the big theatres in the South, and Nirdlinger and Zimmerman ran theatres in Ohio. Frohman also controlled a chain of movie theatres that stretched all the way to the West Coast. The men talked on the state of American theatre over lunch. The Theatrical Syndicate had effectively been created by these men. They believed that in order for the Syndicate to flourish, it needed to establish a monopoly. The men had united all of the theatres they owned or represented into a national network within weeks of their lunch meeting, marking the commencement of the Theatrical Syndicate.

== Operation ==
Theatre companies in America thrived through touring in the late nineteenth and early twentieth century. The Syndicate just required key theatres between the big touring cities to gain control of the situation. The Syndicate did not require control of the city's theatres. It just had to keep track of theatres on the highways leading into the city. The group would achieve this by 1900. Because to Nixon and Zimmerman's influence, Philadelphia was the first city completely taken over by the Syndicate.

The Syndicate started out with 33 first-class theatres. Frohman, Klaw, and Erlanger became the organization's booking agents. Company managers were no longer negotiating with individual theatre managers to plan their tours. Instead, they had to go through the Syndicate, who orchestrated their tour.

They would go on to have control of the activities of around 1500 theatres. Through Frohman they would also have control or be actively managing lead actors, such as, William Gillette, John Drew, Annie Russell, Maude Adams, Henry Miller, and many more.

== Praise ==
The establishment of the Syndicate is described by Daniel Frohman, Charles Frohman's brother. "They determined that its only economic hope was in a centralization of booking interests, and they acted promptly on this decision," he says, after addressing the developing turmoil in the theatre sector. Those who praised the Syndicate claimed that by standardizing bookings, they had rescued theatre. Routing of road-based enterprises was regarded as chaotic prior to the founding of the Syndicate. Due to fierce competition, smaller travel companies found themselves in debt. Klaw, who acted as spokesman for the Syndicate, was quoted as saying, "The Theatrical Syndicate has brought order out of chaos, legitimate profit out of ruinous rivalry."

== Criticism ==
Managers, agents, and actors all voiced criticism and opposition to the Syndicate. The management sought to put a stop to the Syndicate at first, but they failed practically as soon as they started. David Belasco would eventually make a working agreement with The Syndicate. Harrison Grey Fiske attempted to oppose The Syndicate but would ultimately achieve nothing.

The Syndicate faced a more serious threat in the shape of actor mutiny. Nat Goodwin, Francis Wilson, and Richard Mansfield were among the most notable actors to speak out. James A. Herne and James O'Neill were among those who stood up to the Syndicate. Minnie Maddern Fiske, a well-known actress, became well known for her opposition to the Syndicate. She became well known for her parts in Ibsen, Shaw, and Wilde plays. The actors' voices were far louder than any prior opponents'. The conflict, however, was cut short when Nat Goodwin, the rebellion's original leader, was "caught" by the Syndicate. On 24 January 1898, it was announced that Mansfield had reconsidered his position and would perform in Syndicate theatres. Wilson was offered fifty thousand dollars for a half interest in his business, which he accepted. Herne and O'Neill both went into semi-retirement.

Fiske would continue her boycott of Syndicate theatres, choosing to perform only in independent theatres, as well as, tents, convention halls, roller skating rinks, and anywhere else that could host an audience.

== Shubert family ==
The Shubert brothers, Sam, Lee, and J.J., were the only true threat to the Syndicate. Sam Shubert was regarded as the "chief" of their empire during its early phases. Sam was in charge of theatres in Utica, Rochester, Syracuse, New York City, and Troy by the age of twenty-one. He acquired several more during the next five years, all around the country. His holdings were only surpassed by Syndicate at this point. Sam, on the other hand, was killed in a railroad accident in 1905. His brothers formed a temporary working deal with the Syndicate after his death. The Shuberts were strong enough to go toe-to-toe with the Syndicate after three years of securing their holdings. The Shuberts began by operating in a similar fashion to the Syndicate. They interacted with theatre managers and were able to book the manager for a year's tour, but anything longer proved unprofitable. The Shubert brothers then shifted their strategy. They gave up on the idea of purchasing theatres. Rather, they concentrated on gathering actors. The Syndicate did not have enough players or plays to fill all of their theatres during the 1908-09 season. The Shubert brothers took advantage of this by following the Syndicate to specific cities and conducting similar but higher-quality work there.

== Decline ==
Several well-known performers and playwrights switched from the Syndicate to the Shuberts in early 1910. The Shubert brothers' campaign inspired smaller independent theatres to stand up to the Syndicate, and by April, the New England area had declared complete independence from the Syndicate. The National Theatre Owners Association was founded in May of that year by 1,200 small town theatre owners. This act contributed to the Syndicate's loss of control over American theatre.

== See also ==
- Morosco Theatre
