= Rosemary, That's for Remembrance (play) =

1896 play by Louis N. Parker and Murry Carson

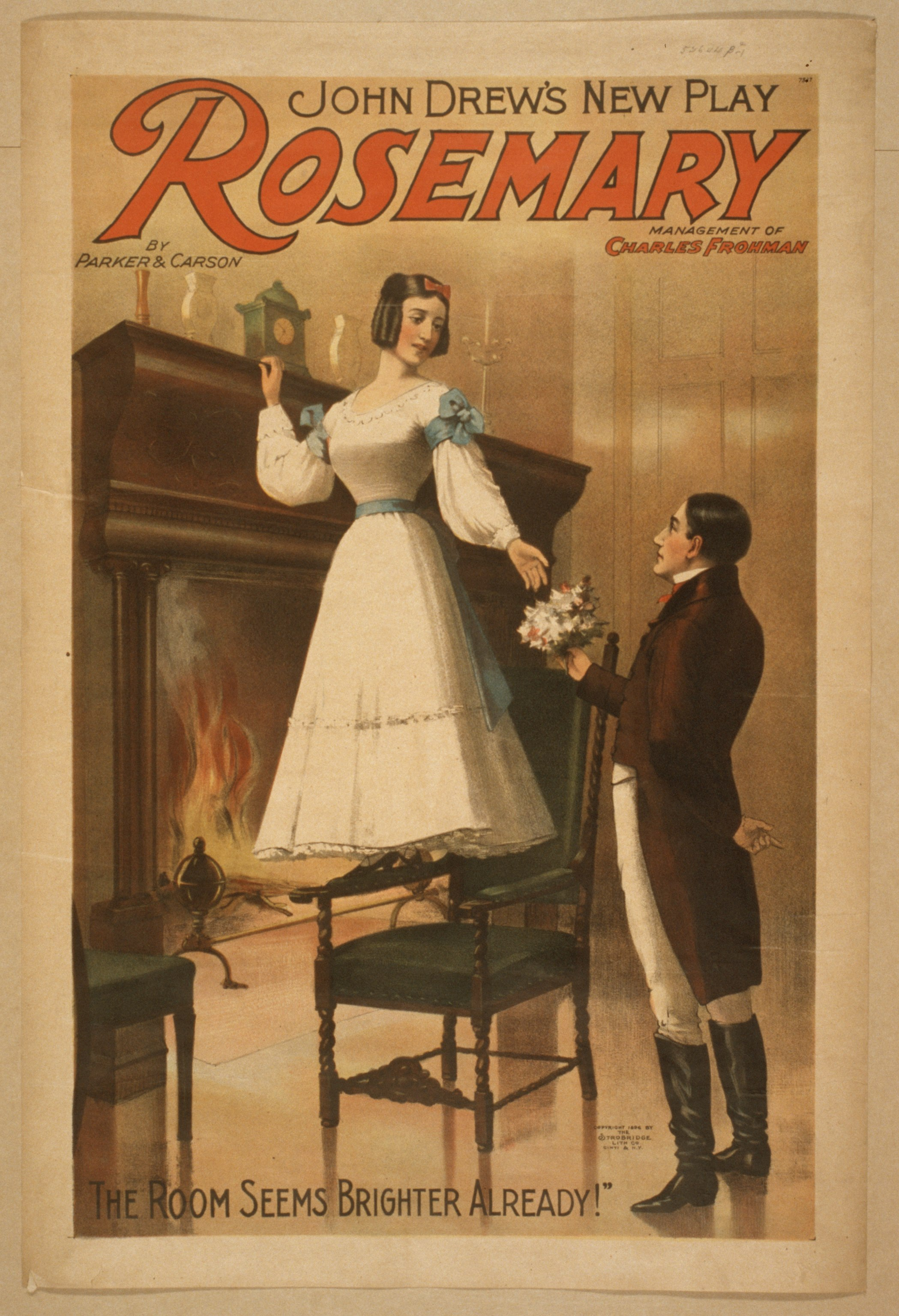
- Poster for US production
- Original language: English
- Written by: Louis N. Parker and Murray Carson
- Music by: Victor Hollander
- Subject: Wistful remembrance of lost love
- Genre: Comedy
- Setting: Dorset and London, June 1838; London, June 1887

Premiere
- Date: May 16, 1896 (UK); August 31, 1896 (US)
- Place: Criterion Theatre (UK); Empire Theatre (US)
- Directed by: Charles Wyndham

Rosemary, That's for Remembrance is an 1896 play by the British writers Louis N. Parker and Murray Carson. The four-act comedy with three settings is often just referred to as Rosemary. The title refers to the associations of the herb in folklore. The story concerns the attempt of a middle-aged bachelor to help an eloping young couple reconcile with the girl's parents, his growing fascination with her, and his later melancholy. The first three acts take place in 1838, culminating with Queen Victoria's coronation day, while the last act occurs on the start of the monarch's Golden Jubilee year.

The play was first produced and staged in London's West End by Charles Wyndham during May 1896, with sets by Walter Hann and incidental music by Victor Hollander. Wyndham starred in the production, with Mary Moore supporting. It ran through July 1896, for 81 performances.

The play was produced in North America by Charles Frohman. It starred John Drew, with Maude Adams in support. It made its Broadway premiere in late August 1896, running through December 1896 for 136 performances.

The play was adapted for an American silent film of the same title in 1914, and had a limited Broadway revival during January 1915.

== Characters ==
Characters are listed in order of appearance within their scope.

Lead

- Sir Jasper Thorndyke, Bt is 40, a generous, sentimental bachelor who had already lost one love long ago.

Supporting

- William Westwood is a churlish young ensign in the East India Company's Regiment of Foot, beloved of Dorothy.
- Dorothy Cruikshank called Dolly, is 18, a pretty young girl of literary habit. (Note: Whether intentional or not on the part of the authors, she is the same age as Queen Victoria.)
- Capt. Cruikshank, RN is a stiff-necked old sea-dog, who had been a captain under Lord Nelson.
- Professor Jogram is a crusty old scholar who lives with Sir Jasper.

Featured

- George Minifie is an old "postboy" (postillion) of the post chaise carrying the young couple.
- Abraham is an easy-going old countryman, servant to Sir Jasper.
- Mrs. Cruikshank called Hannah, is Dorothy's mother and the meek country-born wife of Capt. Cruikshank.
- Priscilla is a pert country girl, serving maid then later housekeeper to Sir Jasper.
- Mrs. Minifie is George's wife, the owner of a London coffee house from which the post chaise came.
- Stilt Walker (Note: Though named in cast lists, neither UK nor US reviewers in 1896 mention this character. Parker dropped it from his 1924 revision.)

== Synopsis ==
Louis Parker revised this play in 1924, the only published version available. This synopsis favors the version produced on stage in 1896 and reported by contemporaneous drama critics.

Act I: Sir Jasper Makes a Mistake (The High Road, just outside Sir Jasper's estate, evening.) Dorothy and William, eloping in a post-chaise, find themselves spilled out onto the ground when it overturns on a dark country road. The postboy George has also fallen and is unsure of their location. Fortunately, Sir Jasper and his servant Abraham arrive with a lamp. He quickly grasps the couple's situation, and invites them to spend the night at his manor house. No sooner are they settled, when another lost couple appears. Sir Jasper realizes these are the girl's parents, the Cruikshanks. Thinking that a shared misfortune might lead to reconcilement, he invites them also to lodge the night at Ingle Hall. (Quick Curtain)

Act II: Sir Jasper Makes Amends (Dining-room at Ingle Hall, morning.) Sir Jasper is contemplating his little surprise for the two couples, when Dorothy surprises him with an armful of flowers from the garden. He is startled at his own awakening interest in the girl, who shows gratitude for his hospitality. The morning brings discord when William and Capt. Cruikshank encounter each other at breakfast. Sir Jasper eventually placates William by getting Capt. Cruikshank to talk about his experiences with Nelson. Jogram perplexes Priscilla with his highbrow manner of speaking, while he is baffled by her West Country solecisms. Having secured the parents' acquiescence to the nuptials, Sir Jasper suggests they all return to London to view the coronation celebrations. (Curtain)

Act III: Sir Jasper Forgets (Mrs. Minifie's Coffee House, London.) Both couples, with Sir Jasper and Jogram, have arrived at Mrs. Minifie's Coffee House, where from an upper floor dining room they expect to view the coronation procession. Sir Jasper, aware he cuts a better figure than the callow and jealous William, now starts to imagine a life with Dorothy. However, he is brought up short by Jogram, who recalls him to honorable conduct, and assures that in time he will forget his love for Dorothy. She has given Sir Jasper some rosemary flowers, which he put carefully into his wallet, and some pages from her diary in which she wrote flatteringly of him. These he slips into a crack in the panelling of the dining room, as the company watches the procession below. (Curtain)

Act IV: Sir Jasper Remembers (Same as Act III, fifty years later.) Sir Jasper, now aged 90, has returned as he does every year on this anniversary of the Queen's accession. The derelict coffee house has been owned by him for many years. He cherishes it for the memory of Dorothy, who like every other character in the play is long gone. He chuckles to himself over Prof. Jogram wanting to marry his housekeeper Priscilla as he grew childish in old age. Behind a decayed section of panelling he finds the remains of Rosemary's diary pages. Looking at them, he suddenly pulls some dried bits of flowers from his wallet. "Rosemary" he says, "that's for remembrance". (Curtain)

== Original production ==
=== Background ===
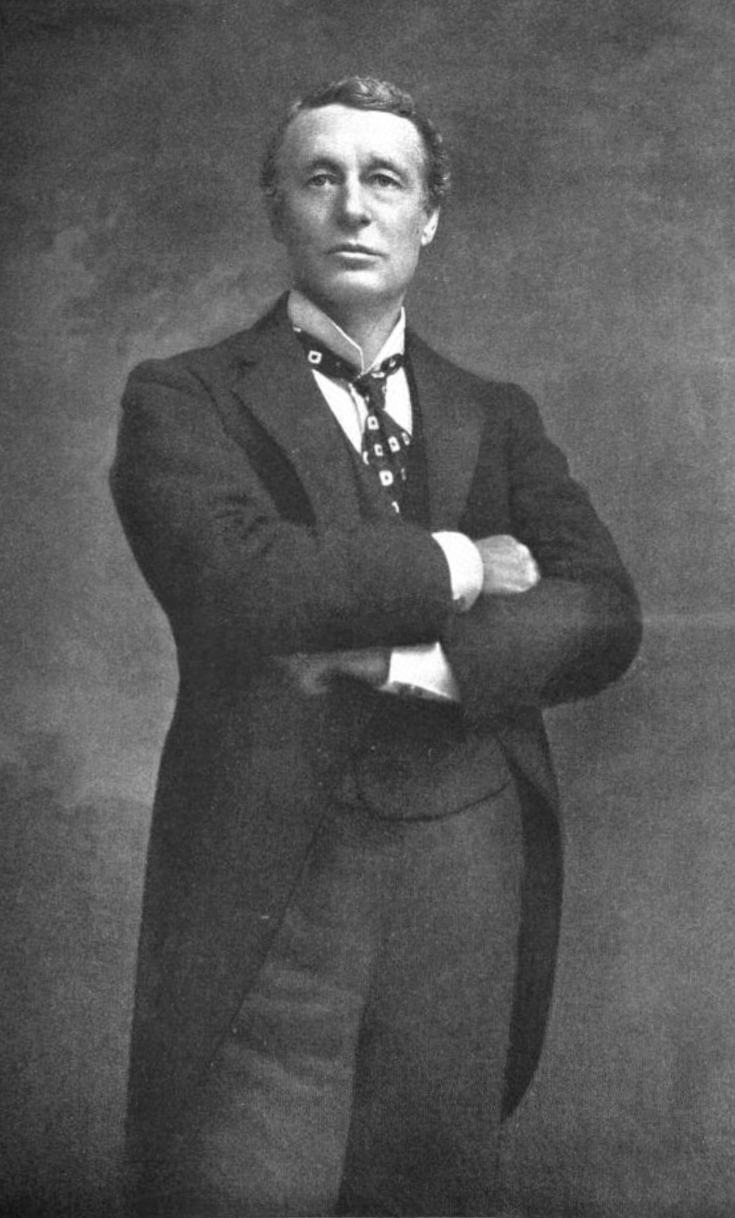
Charles Wyndham 1899

Louis N. Parker and Murray Carson, an actor, had already collaborated on two plays, Gudgeons (1893) and The Blue Boar (1894). Carson had previously used a nom de plume "Thorton Clark", but not for Rosemary, That's for Remembrance, nor for the next collaboration with Parker, The Spendthrift. Carson also wrote the melodrama When Greek Meets Greek, (Note: Also known as The Roll of the Drum.) with Joseph Hatton, from the latter's novel.

Rosemary had been announced for Charles Wyndham's company at the Criterion Theatre in April 1896 but was delayed, first by Wyndham's health, and second by preparations for a celebration of his twentieth year managing the Criterion, at which the Prince of Wales was expected to attend. Wyndham staged the play, which had sets by Walter Hann, and incidental music by Victor Hollander.

Charles Frohman had secured the North American rights to produce Rosemary, which was planned as a season-opener for John Drew's company. Rehearsals began at the Empire Theatre on August 10, 1896. Drew's company consisted of Maude Adams, Harry Harwood, Arthur Bryan, Annie Adams, Joseph Humphreys, and Frank Lamb. Charles Frohman signed Daniel Harkins from Richard Mansfield's company for Rosemary.

=== Cast ===
Principal cast during the original West End run.
Role	Actor	Dates	Notes and sources
Sir Jasper Thorndyke	Charles Wyndham	May 16, 1896 - Jul 25, 1896	
William Westwood	Kenneth Douglas	May 16, 1896 - Jul 25, 1896	
Dorothy Cruikshank	Mary Moore	May 16, 1896 - Jul 25, 1896	
Capt. Cruikshank	Alfred Bishop	May 16, 1896 - Jul 25, 1896	Bishop was a last minute replacement when Mr. Righton, a member of Wyndham's company, became ill.
Prof. Jogram	J. H. Barnes	May 16, 1896 - Jul 25, 1896	
George Minifie	J. Welch	May 16, 1896 - Jul 25, 1896	
Abraham	F. H. Tyler	May 16, 1896 - Jul 25, 1896	
Mrs. Cruikshank	Carlotta Addison	May 16, 1896 - Jul 25, 1896	
Priscilla	Annie Hughes	May 16, 1896 - Jul 25, 1896	
Mrs. Minifie	Emily Vining	May 16, 1896 - Jul 25, 1896	
Stilt Walker	J. Byron	May 16, 1896 - Jul 25, 1896	

Principal cast during the original Broadway run.
Role	Actor	Dates	Notes and sources
Sir Jasper Thorndyke	John Drew	Aug 31, 1896 - Dec 26, 1896	
William Westwood	Arthur Byron	Aug 31, 1896 - Dec 26, 1896	
Dorothy Cruikshank	Maude Adams	Aug 31, 1896 - Dec 26, 1896	
Capt. Cruikshank	Harry Harwood	Aug 31, 1896 - Dec 26, 1896	
Prof. Jogram	Daniel Harkins	Aug 31, 1896 - Dec 26, 1896	
George Minifie	Joseph Humphreys	Aug 31, 1896 - Dec 26, 1896	
Abraham	Frank Lamb	Aug 31, 1896 - Dec 26, 1896	
Mrs. Cruikshank	Annie Adams	Aug 31, 1896 - Dec 26, 1896	
Priscilla	Ethel Barrymore	Aug 31, 1896 - Dec 26, 1896	At age 17, this was Barrymore's second year performing with the company of her uncle, John Drew.
Mrs. Minifie	Mrs. King	Aug 31, 1896 - Dec 26, 1896	
Stilt Walker	Charles Gibson	Aug 31, 1896 - Dec 26, 1896	

=== West End premiere and reception ===
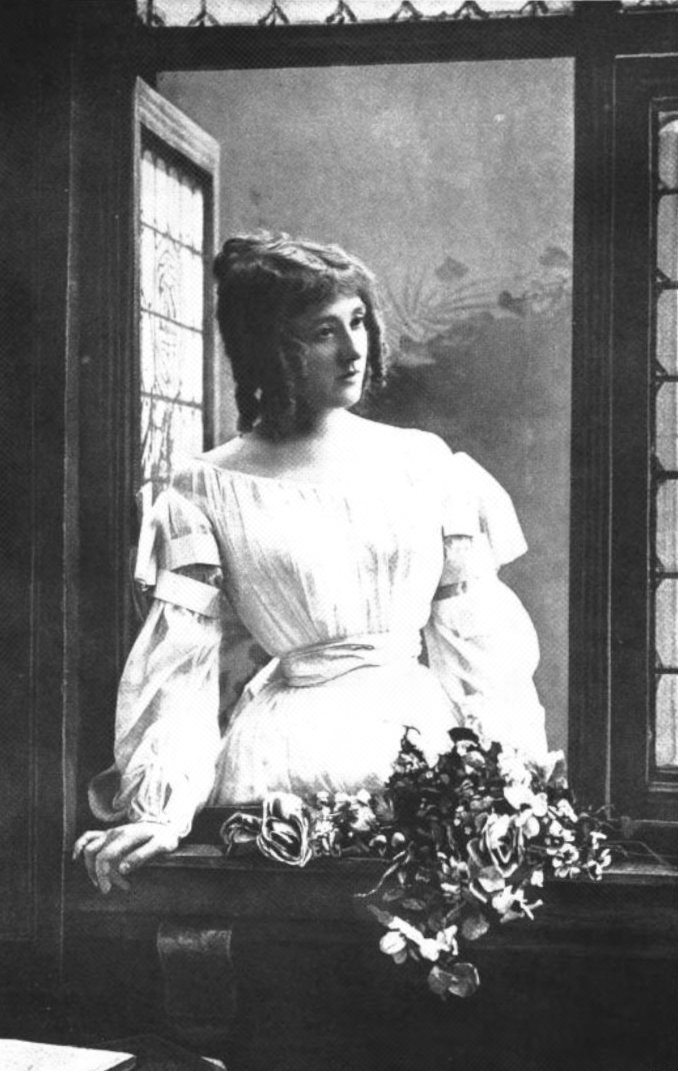
Mary Moore

Rosemary had its West End premiere at the Criterion Theatre on May 16, 1896. The reviewer for Lloyd's Weekly Newspaper was very positive about the play, praising the acting and writing, while mentioning Charles Wyndham's Act IV makeup was so striking he couldn't be recognized until he spoke. They also reported the audience wouldn't disperse at final curtain until the authors and Wyndham appeared on stage for a brief speech. The Observer's critic said "the piece was at once entertaining, impressive, and powerful" and predicted "Rosemary will draw the town".

However, there were dissenting views. The reviewer for The Pall Mall Gazette called the young elopers "a couple of noodles", and thought the play of weak construction, "cleverness misapplied", and deplored the repeated anti-climaxes of Act III. They also suggested the monologue that is Act IV should have been eliminated or reduced in duration. Their overall opinion was that a flawed play was saved by excellent acting, and they were especially charmed by Mary Moore's portrayal. The Daily Telegraph's critic was receptive to the nostalgia of the piece, but turned severe at two failures of the writing: "A weak, frivolous, heartless, and unsatisfactory heroine", and "a wearisome, tedious, and meaningless monologue called a last act". The play ended its West End season at the Criterion on July 25, 1896.

=== Broadway premiere and reception ===
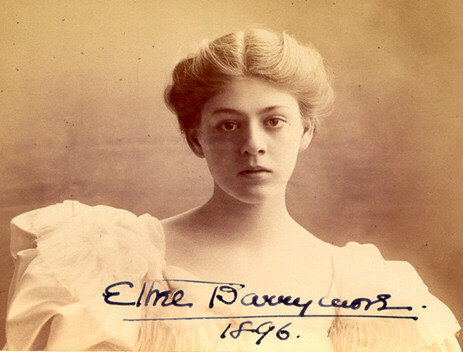
Ethel Barrymore

Rosemary had its Broadway premiere at the Empire Theatre on August 31, 1896. New York reviewers were aware that it had been a success for Charles Wyndham in London just a month earlier. John Drew received top billing in ads, without any other actors or the authors mentioned; in the London papers the entire cast was listed in advertisements. The New York Times reviewer thought Rosemary a sweet but inconsequential triumph of pictures over action, but that it did afford Drew more range for acting than his usual parts. They also expressed surprise at the amount of "rapturous applause" for Ethel Barrymore's fine depiction of a slight character.

The critic for the New-York Tribune gave the full name of the play, and concurred that "the piece contains more of picture than of action". They segued from the play's nostalgic evocation of 1830's England to their own longing for a bygone theater, but returned to report the triumphic reception of the play by the first-night audience. The World's reviewer noted the play's London success and forecast a similar triumph in New York. They also thought the last act could be dispensed with, but praised Parker and Carson for the dialogue and characters of the first three.

Rosemary closed at the Empire Theatre on December 26, 1896.

== Adaptations ==
=== Film ===
- Rosemary, That's for Remembrance - 1914 American silent film

=== Revival ===
Rosemary, That's for Remembrance was revived at the Empire Theatre on January 12, 1915. It was again produced by Charles Frohman, with Charles Drew and Harry Harwood reprising their original roles as Sir Jasper and Capt. Cruikshank. Alexandra Carlisle (Dorothy Cruickshank), Herbert Druce (Prof. Jogram), and Frank M. Thomas (William Westwood) were the other principals for this limited engagement of eleven evening and four matinee performances. The revival was made possible by Ethel Barrymore agreeing to postpone her own opening night in The Shadow (L'ombra), by Dario Niccodemi.

=== Literary ===
In 1924, the play was unilaterally "Revised and Re-written by Louis N. Parker" for publication. He dropped one character (Stilt Walker), provided exact dates and new locales for each act, and made other less certain changes. This revisionism was a trait shared by some of Parker's contemporaries, such as Hall Caine with The Christian and Israel Zangwill with Merely Mary Ann.

== Bibliography ==
- Louis N. Parker. Rosemary, That's for Remembrance: A Comedy in Four Acts. Samuel French, 1924.
- Israel Zangwill. Merely Mary Ann: A Comedy in Four Acts. Samuel French (Canada) Ltd., 1921.
