= Lord Chumley =

1914 film directed by James Kirkwood

- Directed by: James Kirkwood
- Written by: David Belasco; Henry Churchill de Mille
- Starring: Lillian Gish
- Cinematography: Henry Cronjager
- Distributed by: General Film Company
- Release date: June 14, 1914
- Running time: 40 minutes
- Country: United States
- Language: Silent with English intertitles

Lord Chumley is a 1914 American silent short drama film directed by James Kirkwood. Prints of the film survive at the film archive of the Library of Congress. The film began production before November 1913, but it was not released until June 1914. It is based on the 1888 play that starred E. H. Sothern. Lord Chumley was remade into the 1925 film Forty Winks.

== Plot ==
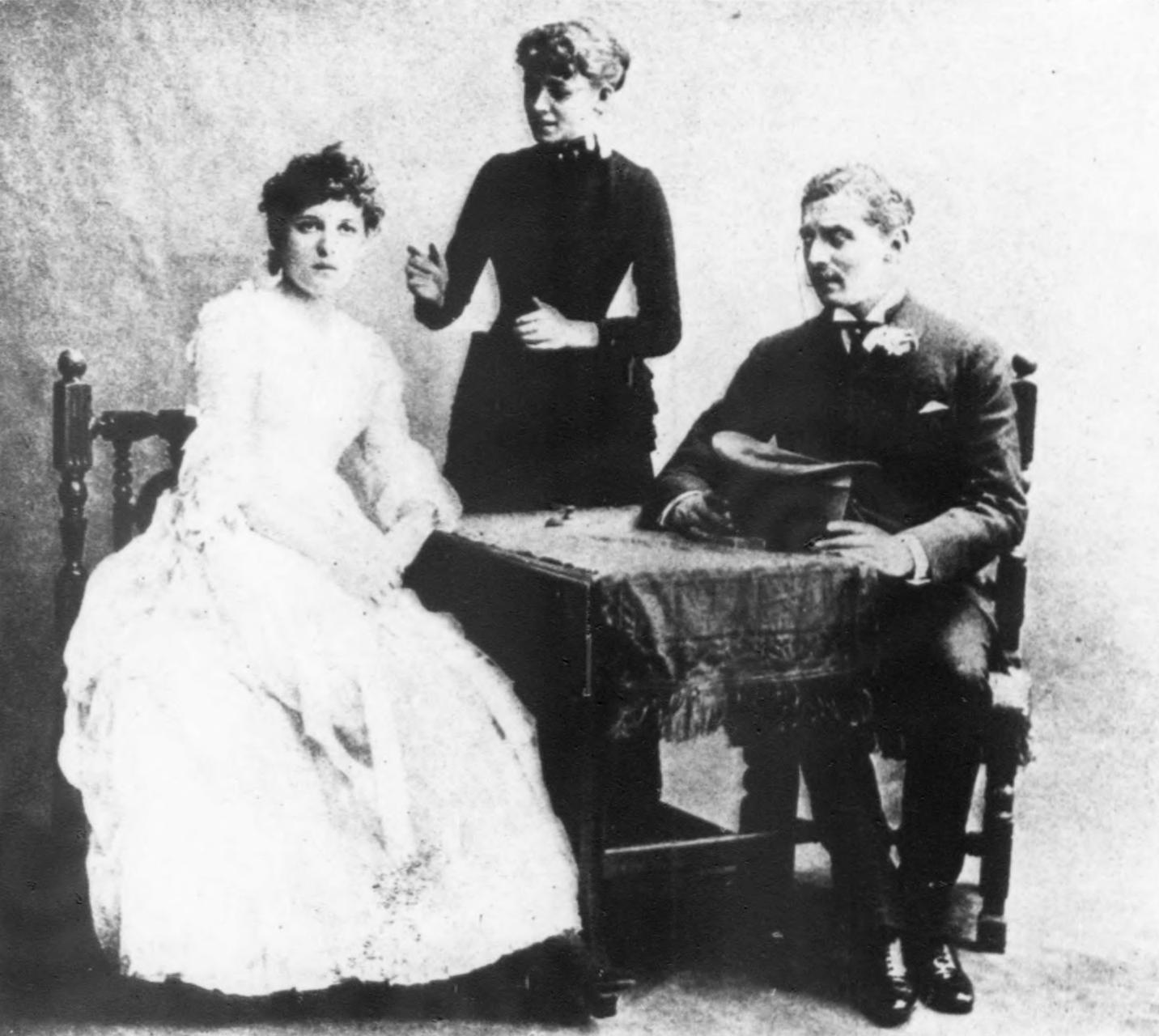
Belle Archer, Maude Adams, and E. H. Sothern in the Lyceum production of Lord Chumley, 1899

Gaspar La Sage and Blink Blunk decide to plan another robbery upon their release from prison. After Blink Blunk is caught and locked up in prison again, Le Sage poses as a gentleman in England. Lt. Hugh Butterworth allows his friend Lord Chumley to stay at his summer home, and Chumley becomes attracted to Butterworth's sister Eleanor while Butterworth's aunt Adeline is attracted to Chumley. La Sage now runs a casino and defeats Butterworth in gambling, leading Butterworth to lose a large amount of money. The army barracks helps arrange over £1,000 for the widow of a fallen soldier named McGregor and they have Butterworth deliver the money, but Butterworth decides to gamble at La Sage's casino.

La Sage steals £800 of the amount after making Butterworth become unconscious by drugging him. After Butterworth wakes up, he gives the remaining £200 to the widow and she gives him a letter that thanks him for the money. Butterworth fails to receive the money back from La Sage when the casino owner threatens to show the letter to Hugh's commanding officer Colonel Pembroke if Butterworth refuses to make Eleanor have an affection for La Sage. After Butterworth describes the situation to Chumley, Chumley works to uncover La Sage's past. Blink Blunk finds La Sage and wants payment from him for being sent to prison while Chumley hears their conversation. Chumley also notices a prison tattoo on their chests. Chumley reveals La Sage's tattoo and gives the widow the rest of the £1000. The widow writes a new thank you letter to override the content of the previous letter. Detective Zavier has La Sage leave the United States. Chumley becomes engaged to Eleanor while Butterworth becomes engaged to Jessie.

== Production ==
A July 12, 1913, article in Motography stated that Klaw and Erlanger created a film production company named the Protective Film Company and would work with the Biograph Company to produce almost 400 plays into films with the help of more than 600 people. The film is based on a play of the same name that was created and produced in 1886 by Henry Churchill de Mille as well as co-produced by David Belasco. An advertisement released by the General Film Company stated that the production is based on "the play in which E. H. Sothern scored his initial success." It has been speculated that Raymond Griffith might have supervised the film's production due to director James Kirkwood being a protégé of Griffith and the film starring Henry B. Walthall and Lillian Gish whom Griffith supported. The film was released in June 1914, but the outdoor scenery in it showed that filming happened before November 1913. The Atlanta Constitution said that the film was produced by Vitagraph Studios. Other sources say otherwise.

== Release ==
A release on the roof of a Loews theatre in New York City was canceled due to the length of the film. The on-screen announcement said "that owing to the length of the vaudeville program the feature picture would not be shown on the Roof but that it could be seen down-stairs at 9.50. No one dropped down unless they went down at intermission and didn't come back". Lord Chumley was remade into the 1925 film Forty Winks. Prints of the film survive at the film archive of the Library of Congress.

== Reception ==
The Buffalo Times said, "The scintillating military ball is one of the most gorgeous scenes ever shown. The photography is exceptional and is up to the Klaw and Erlanger standard." The Atlanta Constitution wrote that "Lord Chumley is a story of army life that contains every element of human appeal and has stirring scenes staged with typical Vitagraph ingenuity." Motion Picture News said, "There is nothing exciting about the story and sometimes it moves at a rather slow pace."

== Cast ==
The major cast based on the American Film Institute.

- Lillian Gish as Eleanor Butterworth
- Henry B. Walthall as Lord Chumley
- Mary Alden as Jessie
- Walter Miller as Lt. Hugh Butterworth
- Charles Hill Mailes as Gaspar La Sage
- Helen Hart as Meg McGregor
