= Men and Women (1925 film) =

1925 film by William C. deMille

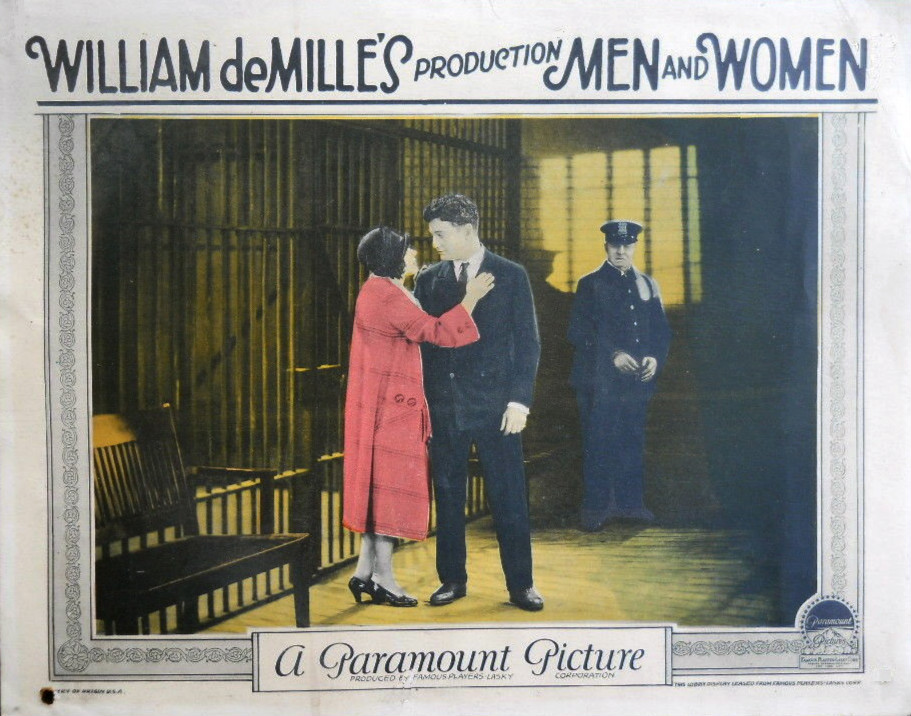
- Lobby card
- Directed by: William C. deMille
- Written by: Clara Beranger (scenario)
- Based on: Men and Women by David Belasco and Henry Churchill de Mille
- Produced by: Adolph Zukor; Jesse Lasky
- Starring: Richard Dix; Claire Adams
- Cinematography: L. Guy Wilky
- Distributed by: Paramount Pictures
- Release date: March 23, 1925
- Running time: 60 minutes; six reels (6,223 feet)
- Country: United States
- Language: Silent (English intertitles)

Men and Women is a 1925 American silent drama film produced by Famous Players–Lasky and released by Paramount Pictures. It was directed by William C. deMille and starred Richard Dix, Claire Adams, and Neil Hamilton. It is based on a play, Men and Women, written years earlier by David Belasco and Henry Churchill de Mille, father of the director.

== Plot ==
Robert Stevens robs the bank where he is employed, and through the efforts of Calvin Stedman, the prosecuting attorney, he is sentenced to six years' imprisonment. While in jail his wife dies and his little daughter, Agnes, is placed in a convent. At the expiration of his sentence, Stevens locates his daughter and settles in Arizona, assuming the name of Stephen Rodman.

== Cast ==
- Richard Dix as Will Prescott
- Claire Adams as Agnes Prescott
- Neil Hamilton as Ned Seabury
- Henry Stephenson as Arnold Kirke
- Robert Edeson as Israel Cohen
- Flora Finch as Kate

== Production ==
=== Development ===
A 1914 Biograph film with the same name based on the same play still exists. It was directed by James Kirkwood and starred Lionel Barrymore, Blanche Sweet and her future husband Marshall Neilan.

== Preservation ==
With no prints of Men and Women located in any film archives, it is considered a lost film.
