= Rosemary (play) =

Rosemary is a comedy by English playwright Louis N. Parker and English playwright and actor Murray Carson. In America, it opened at Charles Frohman's Empire Theatre on Broadway in the August 1896. A film version was produced in 1915.

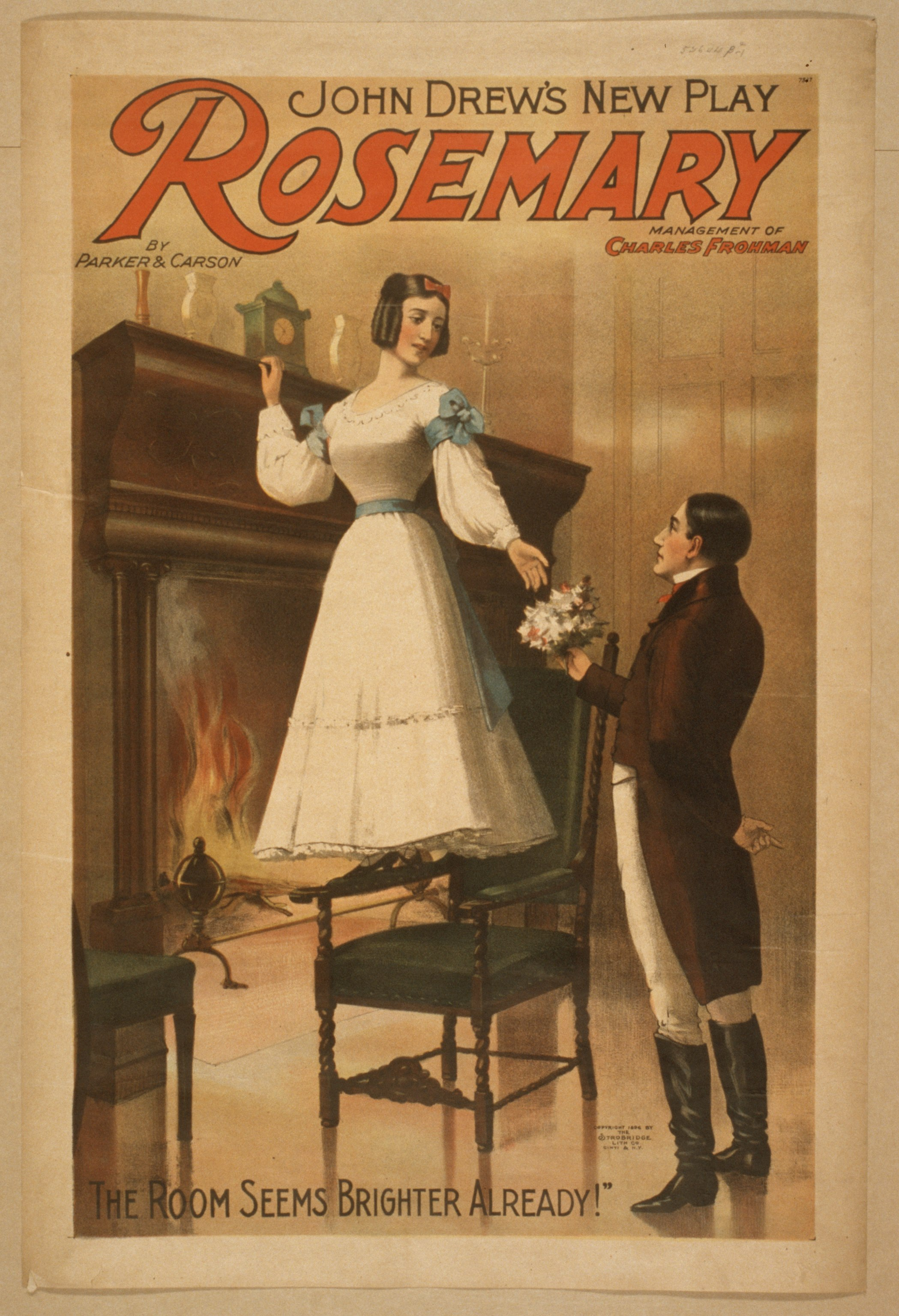
Rosemary

== Original Broadway Cast ==
Sir Jasper Thorndyke	John Drew
Professor Jogram	Daniel Harkins
Captain Cruickshank	Harry Harwood
William Westwood	Arthur Byron
George Minifle	Joseph Humphreys
Abraham	Frank Lamb
Mrs. Cruikshank	Annie Adams
Mrs. Minifle	Mrs. King
Pricscilla, a serving maid	Ethel Barrymore
Dorothy Cruikshank	Maude Adams
