= Kiskadden =

Kiskadden is a surname. Notable people with the surname include:

- Asaneth Ann Adams Kiskadden (1847–1916), American actress
- Maude Ewing Adams Kiskadden (1872–1953), American actress
