= A Midnight Bell =

1921 film

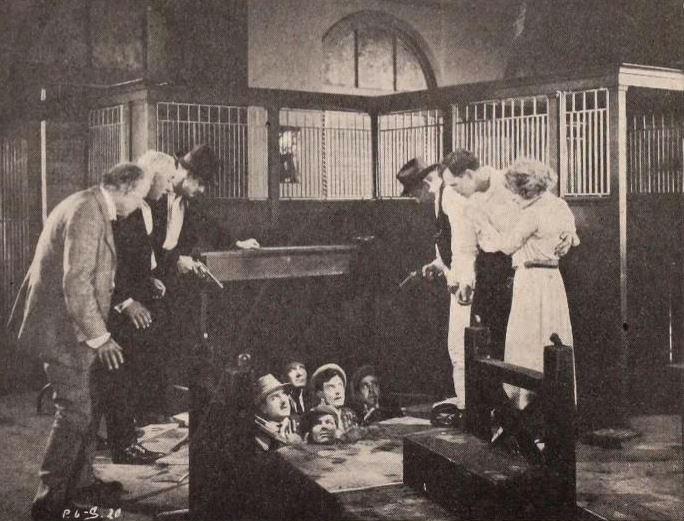
- Film still originally published in the Exhibitors Herald in July 1921.
- Directed by: Charles Ray
- Written by: Richard Andres (adaptation)
- Based on: A Midnight Bell by Charles Hale Hoyt (play)
- Produced by: Charles Ray
- Starring: Charles Ray; Doris Pawn; Donald MacDonald; Van Dyke Brooke
- Cinematography: George Rizard
- Edited by: Harry L. Decker
- Distributed by: Associated First National Pictures
- Release date: August 1921
- Running time: 6,140 ft. / 6 reels/ 66 minutes
- Country: United States
- Language: Silent (English intertitles)

A Midnight Bell is a 1921 American silent comedy film. The film was directed and produced by its star, Charles Ray. His brother, Albert, is thought to have co-directed some scenes. The film is believed to be lost.

The film is based on a play by the same name written by Charles Hale Hoyt that premiered on Broadway in 1889 with Maude Adams in a leading role and starred Eugene Canfield as Martin Tripp.

Director Charles Ray went on to lose his entire fortune in 1923 when he produced The Courtship of Miles Standish, which was a terrible flop at the box office. He later died in 1943 from a severe tooth infection.

== Plot ==
Martin Tripp is a traveling salesman who turns a struggling small-town store into a successful business. He becomes involved in a mystery involving an old church that is supposed to be haunted. Tripp is challenged to spend a night in the old building. A group of criminals, pretending to manifest supernatural phenomena, are exposed by Tripp in the end.

== Cast ==
- Charles Ray as Martin Tripp
- Donald MacDonald as Stephen Labaree
- Van Dyke Brooke as Abner Grey
- Doris Pawn as Annie Grey
- Clyde McCoy as Mac
- Jess Herring as Spike
- S.J. Bingham as 'Bull' Barton
- Bert Offord as 'Slick' Sweeney
- Monte Collins (bit part, uncredited)
