= The Pretty Sister of Jose =

The Pretty Sister of Jose may refer to:

- The Pretty Sister of José, an 1889 novel by Frances Hodgson Burnett
- The Pretty Sister of Jose (play), a 1903 American play, based on the novel
- The Pretty Sister of Jose (film), a 1915 American silent romantic drama, based on the novel and play
