= A Midnight Bell (play) =

Play written by Charles Hale Hoyt

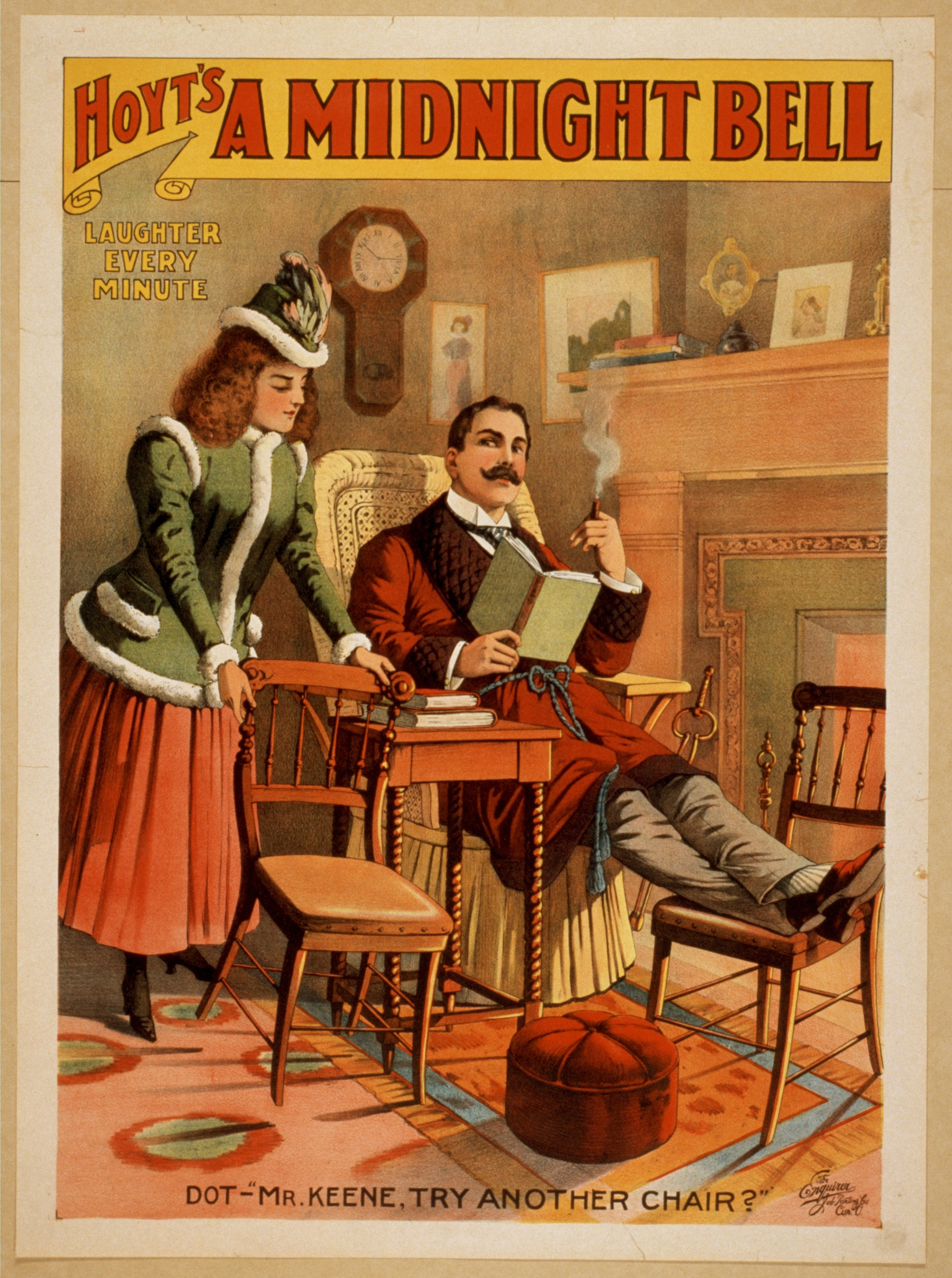
- 1898 lithograph
- Written by: Charles H. Hoyt
- Genre: Comedy

Premiere
- Date premiered: 5 March 1889
- Place premiered: Bijou Theatre

A Midnight Bell is a play written by Charles H. Hoyt. It was featured on Broadway in 1889 and starred Maude Adams. The play was adapted into an American silent film of the same name in 1921.

The show ran from March 5 (delayed by one day for final rehearsal) through July 1, 1889.

== Broadway cast ==
- Clergyman by R.J. Dillon
- Deacon by Thomas Q. Seabrooke
- City Lawyer by Frank Lane
- Bank Cashier by W.J. Humphreys
- Bank Teller by Hart Conway
- Bank President by T.J. Herndon
- Country Boy by Eugene Canfield
- Village Doctor by Jesse Jenkins
- Village Fiddler by Percy Gaunt
- Schoolma'am by Isabelle Coe
- Minister's Sister by Maude Adams
- Old Maid by Annie Adams
- Widow by Marie Uart
- Soprano of the Choir by Elvia Croix
- Village Maiden by Beth Bedford
- Help by Bessie Weyl
