= Men and Women (1914 film) =

- Directed by: James Kirkwood; D. W. Griffith (supervising director)
- Written by: David Belasco (play); Henry Churchill de Mille (play); Frank E. Woods (scenario)
- Produced by: Marc Klaw; Abraham Erlanger
- Starring: Lionel Barrymore; Blanche Sweet
- Production company: Biograph Company
- Distributed by: General Film Company
- Release date: August 1914
- Running time: 30 minutes; 3 reels
- Country: United States
- Language: Silent(English intertitles)

Men and Women is an extant 1914 American silent film produced by the Biograph Company and released by General Film Company. It is based on the 1890 play of the same name by David Belasco and Henry Churchill de Mille. It stars Lionel Barrymore, Blanche Sweet and Marshall Neilan. Sweet and Neilan would later marry in real life.

== Plot ==
Robert Stevens robs the bank where he is employed, and through the efforts of Calvin Stedman, the prosecuting attorney, he is sentenced to six years' imprisonment. While in jail his wife dies and his little daughter, Agnes, is placed in a convent. At the expiration of his sentence, Stevens locates his daughter and settles in Arizona, assuming the name of Stephen Rodman.

== Cast ==
- Lionel Barrymore - Stephen Rodman/Robert Stevens
- Blanche Sweet - Agnes Rodman, Stephen's daughter
- Fred Hearn - District Attorney Calvin Stedman
- Gertrude Robinson - Ruth Prescott
- Marshall Neilan - Will Prescott
- Frank Crane - Ned Seabury (*as Frank Hall Crane)
- Fred Herzog - Kirke, the broker
- Hattie Delaro - Mrs Prescott
- Claire McDowell - Mrs. Stephen Rodman
- Frank M. Norcross - Cohen
- Alan Hale - One of Kirke's Creditors
- Antonio Moreno - Man in Kirke's Office
- Gladys Egan - An Orphan (uncredited)
- Lillian Gish (uncredited)
- Vivian Prescott (uncredited)

== Legacy ==
The story was refilmed by Paramount in 1925 as Men and Women.
