= Georgie Boynton Child =

American efficiency expert

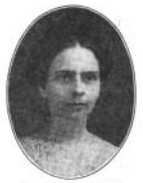
- Georgie Boynton Child, from a 1914 publication.
- Born: Georgie Smith Boynton; August 8, 1873; Woodbridge, New Jersey
- Died: December 10, 1945 (aged 72); Princeton, New Jersey
- Occupation(s): Efficiency expert, writer

Georgie Smith Boynton Child (August 8, 1873 – December 10, 1945) was an American efficiency expert, writer, and business manager.

== Early life ==
Georgie Smith Boynton was born in Woodbridge, New Jersey, the daughter of Casimir Whitman Boynton and Eunice Adelia Harriman Boynton. She earned a bachelor's degree from Vassar College in 1895.

Her older sister Louise Boynton was the partner and personal secretary of actress Maude Adams, for almost fifty years.

== Career ==
From 1897 to 1903, Child was co-owner (with her sister Louise) and business manager at the Perth Amboy Daily Republican, a daily newspaper. In 1911, she and her family moved into the Housekeeping Experiment Station in Stamford, Connecticut. Her book, The Efficient Kitchen: Definite Directions for the Planning, Arranging, and Equipping of the Modern Labor Saving Kitchen; A Practical Book for the Homemaker (1914), was based on the Stamford project. Her advice included tips such as "Keep nothing in the kitchen that is not used every day" and "Have narrow shelves with one row of things on each." She wrote a series of articles for The Delineator, and gave lectures on household efficiency. Her profession was listed as "household engineer" in a 1914 profile.

A new edition of the book was published in 1926, to include more information about electrical wiring, lighting and appliances. In 1932, Child and Louise Boynton published The Golden Grains, a book of economical recipes.

== Personal life ==
Georgie Boynton married mining chemist and metallurgist Alfred Thurston Child in 1903; playwright Anne Crawford Flexner, Boynton's friend from Vassar, was matron of honor at the ceremony. They had four children, Alfred Thurston, Jr., Eunice Adelia, Margaret Lyon, and Louise Boynton. She died in 1945, in Princeton, New Jersey, aged 72 years. Her grandson Richard M. Freeland served as President of Northeastern University and Commissioner of Education for Massachusetts.
