= Forty Winks (1925 film) =

1925 film by Paul Iribe

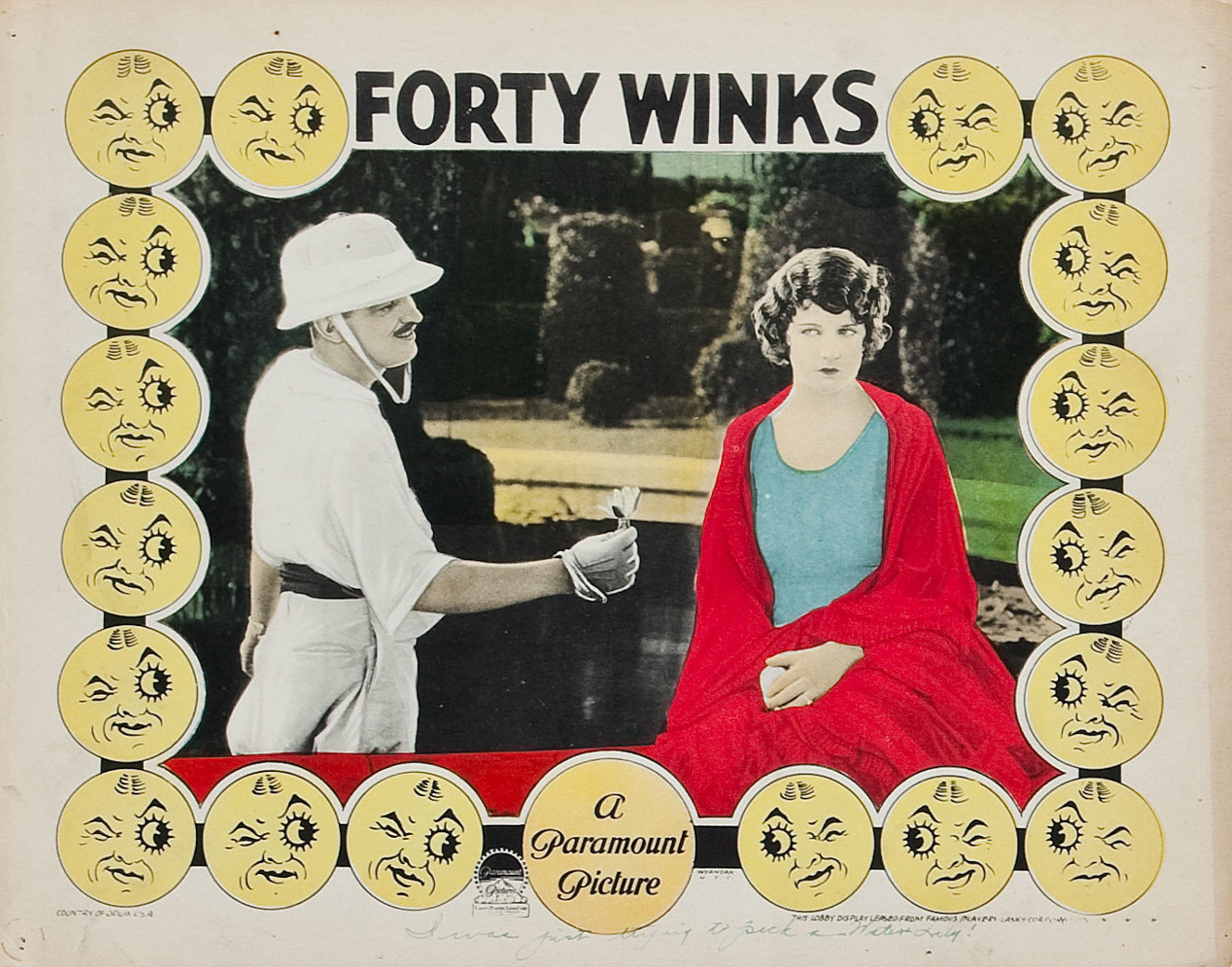
- Lobby card
- Directed by: Paul Iribe; Frank Urson
- Screenplay by: Bertram Millhauser
- Based on: the play Lord Chumley by David Belasco and Henry Churchill de Mille
- Starring: Raymond Griffith; Theodore Roberts; Cyril Chadwick; William Boyd; Anna May Wong
- Cinematography: J. Peverell Marley
- Production company: Famous Players–Lasky Corporation
- Distributed by: Paramount Pictures
- Release date: February 2, 1925
- Running time: 70 minutes
- Country: United States
- Language: Silent (English intertitles)

Forty Winks is a lost 1925 American silent comedy film directed by Paul Iribe and Frank Urson and written by Bertram Millhauser. The film stars Raymond Griffith, Theodore Roberts, Cyril Chadwick, William Boyd, and Anna May Wong. The film was released on February 2, 1925, by Paramount Pictures.

== Plot ==
As described in a review in a film magazine, Gasper Le Sage is attorney to the Butterworths and suitor for the hand of Eleanor Butterworth. He persuades Annabelle Wu, a Eurasian adventuress, to vamp Lt. Gerald Hugh Butterworth and with his keys obtain the plans for a coast defence movement. Suspicion falls upon Lord Chumley of the British secret service, who is also engaged to Eleanor. Le Sage offers to recover the papers if Eleanor will marry him, but "Chumley" forestalls him and gets the papers and wins the young woman's affections after a lively and variagated chase.

== Cast ==
- Raymond Griffith as Lord Chumley
- Theodore Roberts as Adam Butterworth
- Cyril Chadwick as Gasper Le Sage
- William Boyd as Lt. Gerald Hugh Butterworth
- Anna May Wong as Annabelle Wu
- Viola Dana as Eleanor Butterworth

== Preservation ==
With no prints of Forty Winks located in any film archives, it is a lost film.
