= Men and Women (play) =

Men and Women is an American play written by David Belasco and Henry Churchill de Mille.

It was featured on Broadway in 1890, opening at Proctor's Twenty-Third Street Theater on October 21, 1890. The cast included Maude Adams. It proved successful with audiences, and played for over 200 performances.

It was adapted to a silent film of the same name in 1914.

== Original Broadway Cast ==
- Frederic De Belleville as Israel Cohen
- William Morris as Wm. Prescott
- Orrin Johnson as Edwin Seabury
- R.A. Roberts at Calvin Stedman
- Henry Talbot as Lyman H. Webb
- Frank Mordaunt as Stephen Rodman
- M.A. Kennedy as Zachary T. Kip
- T.C. Valentine as "Dick" Armstrong
- J.C. Buckstone as Sam Delafield
- Emmett Corrigan as Arnold Kirke
- Louis Haines as Messenger
- Sydney Armstrong as Agnes Rodman
- Odette Tyler as Mr. Kate Delafield
- Etta Hawkins as Margery Knox
- Annie Adams as Mrs. Jane Prescott
- Lillian Chantore as Mrs. Kirke
- C. Leslie Allen as Pendleton
- W.H. Tillard at Reynolds
- Arthur Hayden as Bergman
- Edgar Mackey as Wayne
- E.J. McCullough as Crawford
- Richard Marlow as John
- Maude Adams as Dora
- Winona Shannon as Lucy
- Gladys Eurelle as Julia

Ida Waterman joined cast as Mrs. Kirke on December 8, 1890 The two-hundredth performance was held on March 25, 1891, and it closed on March 28.
