= Al Hayman =

American businessman (1847–1917)

Al Hayman, also known as Raphael Hayman, (1847 – February 10, 1917) was the business partner of the better-known Charles Frohman who together with others established the Theatrical Syndicate. In addition to the financial backing, ownership and construction of new theaters and the early monopolisation of the booking networks, the Syndicate also produced a number of Broadway shows.

== Biography ==
Al Hayman was born to a Jewish family in Wheeling, West Virginia. He began his theatrical career as a manager for a tour of The Black Crook in 1871. In 1883, Hayman traveled to San Francisco and, leasing the Baldwin Theatre, became its producing manager, becoming a well-known manager. Around 1889 he moved to New York and bought the play Shenandoah with Charles Frohman. He also gained control of a theater in Chicago, starting the wide ownership of theaters. In 1896 he, along with Frohman, Marc Klaw, A.L. Erlanger, Samuel F. Nixon and J. Fred Zimmerman Sr. established the Theatrical Syndicate. This group established systemized booking networks throughout the United States and created a monopoly that controlled every aspect of contracts and bookings until the late 1910s, when the Shubert brothers broke their hold on the industry. Hayman concentrated on investments in real estate.

As theater impresarios and booking agents he helped develop the theater district in New York City at the turn of the 20th century. Hayman owned and/or operated several theaters in New York, such as the Knickerbocker Theatre and the Empire Theatre.

Hayman retired from the theatrical field, leaving his interests to his brother, Alf, and moved to Europe in 1911. Hayman died on February 10, 1917, in New York City.
