= The Bauble Shop =

Play written by Henry Arthur Jones

The Bauble Shop is a play by Henry Arthur Jones. It is about modern London life. It opened at the Criterion Theatre in the West End in 1893. It was featured on Broadway in 1894 and starred Maude Adams.

== Four Acts ==
Act 1: At Lord Clivebrook's, St. Jame's Park

Act 2: At Stoach's Toy Bazaar, Little John Street, Westminster

Act 3: Private Room of the Leader of the House, in the House of Commons

Act 4: At Lord Clivebrook's
