= Clyde McCoy =

American jazz trumpeter (1903–1990)

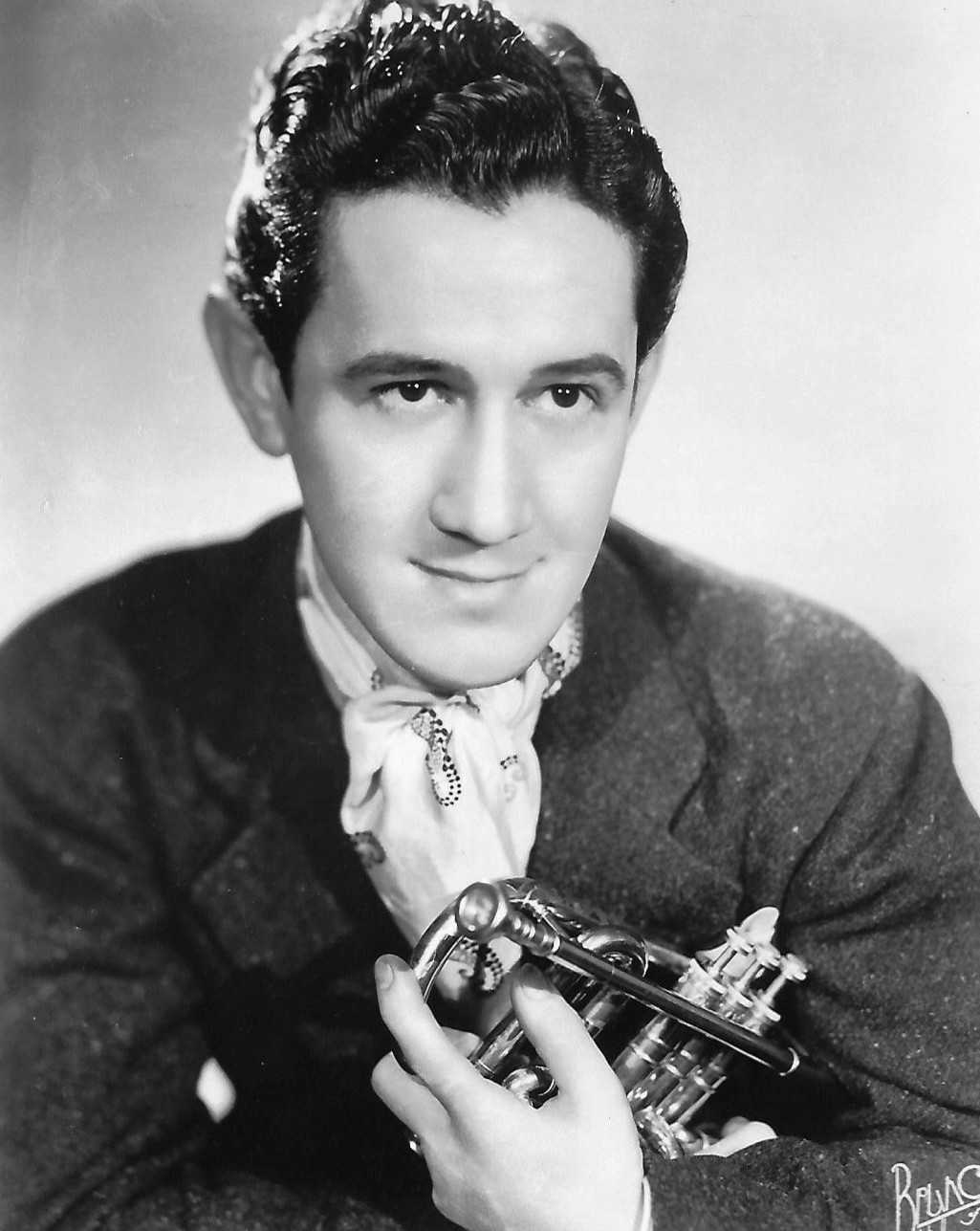
- Clyde McCoy in 1942.

Background information
- Born: Clyde Lee McCoy; December 29, 1903; Ashland, Kentucky, U.S.
- Died: June 11, 1990 (aged 86) Memphis, Tennessee
- Genres: Jazz
- Occupation: Musician
- Instrument: Trumpet
- Years active: 1917–1985

Clyde Lee McCoy (December 29, 1903 – June 11, 1990), was an American jazz trumpeter whose popularity spanned seven decades. He is best remembered for his theme song, "Sugar Blues", written by Clarence Williams and Lucy Fletcher, and also as a co-founder of Down Beat magazine in 1935. The song hit in 1931 and 1935, in Columbia and Decca versions, and returned to Billboard magazine's Country (Hillbilly) chart in 1941. It was also played with vocals, by Bob Wills and his Texas Playboys, Fats Waller and Ella Fitzgerald.

Johnny Mercer had a vocal hit in 1947. McCoy was a member of one of the families of the Hatfield-McCoy feud, and was based at various times in Los Angeles, New York City, and at Chicago's Drake Hotel, where he first performed "Sugar Blues" in 1930. He has a star on the Hollywood Walk of Fame at 6426 Hollywood Boulevard.

== Early career ==
McCoy had begun mastering the trumpet when he was without formal instruction, after the McCoy family moved to Portsmouth, Ohio in 1912. This would lead him to perform regularly at church and school affairs. He was to perform on the Cincinnati riverboats five years later, plying the Mississippi River, and would also perform on the side-wheelers the Island Queen and the Bernard McSwain, becoming one of the youngest musicians on the river at age 14.

McCoy was informed in 1920 by a musical associate about an opening for a small band at a popular resort location in Knoxville, Tennessee, which was originally planned to be a two-week gig. The band boarded a train for Knoxville with a group who had never played together as a unit. The band rehearsed in the train's smoker, en route to the Whittle Springs Hotel and Spa. When the band arrived in Knoxville, owner George Whittle agreed to audition Clyde's "Chicago Orchestra" and approved of their performance, as well the patrons. The Clyde McCoy Orchestra would be officially launched after the gig lasted for 2 months.

== Recorded material ==
McCoy performed his song "Sugar Blues" at the Drake Hotel in Chicago in 1930. Clyde's solo rendition of the song would draw enthusiastic approval from the patrons at the Drake Hotel, and provided national broadcast exposure for the band on the radio. This would also help Clyde be signed to a recording contract with Columbia Records, and the song was recorded on January 22, 1931. It was an instant retail success and continued to enjoy successful sales over the years. The song sold in excess of fourteen million copies internationally by the time of Clyde's retirement in 1985.

The Clyde McCoy Orchestra had a long and successful run at the Drake Hotel before beginning a year-long engagement at Terrace Gardens in Chicago. The band was featured in a Balaban and Katz vaudeville production, before beginning a two-year second engagement Chicago. In mid-1935 Clyde signed a five-year recording contract with Decca Records.

Clyde and the band accelerated their recording activity when they signed with Decca Records. The national recording industry was suffering the Great Depression at the time, which severely hampered the number of record sales. After signing with Decca, McCoy's recording activity accelerated. In addition to conventional retail discs, he began to record regularly at the transcription studios. Those recordings were used primarily in delayed radio broadcasts. Before McCoy entered military service in World War II, he recorded frequently for Associated Transcriptions, both in Chicago and New York. The ASCAP recording ban in 1941 halted recording of all songs composed by its members. Clyde would start recording for LangWorth Transcriptions in New York and several prominent labels, including Mercury, Capitol, and Vocalion Records.

== Personal life ==
McCoy was the son of a Chesapeake and Ohio Railway detective and a member of the McCoy clan that was involved in the Hatfield-McCoy feud.

At his home in Kentucky in 1926, Clyde petitioned the Daylight Lodge No. 760 in Louisville, Tennessee, and received the E.A. Degree on January 9, 1926, the F.C. Degree on May 8, and the M.M. Degree on June 26, 1926. He would be a member of that lodge for 64 years by the time of his death. He became a devoted Mason and a lifetime member of the lodge. Shortly after, Clyde became a member of the Valley of Memphis, Tennessee, A.A.S.R., and joined Kosair Shrine Temple in Louisville, Kentucky.

On January 20, 1945, McCoy married one of the Bennett sisters, Maxine Means, who he had been courting since the girls joined his band back in 1936. The two did not have children, which kept McCoy traveling and performing as long as Clyde's health would permit. He had Alzheimer's disease, and Maxine adamantly rejected medical advice to admit her beloved Clyde to an extended care facility. She cared for him in their home, where he died on June 11, 1990, at age 86. Private memorial services were offered on the 14th at the Memorial Park Rotunda in Memphis.

== "Wah-wah" style and pedal ==
McCoy had been experimenting for nearly ten years with the "wah-wah" trumpet mute. He used it when performing the song "Sugar Blues" and many of the songs in his band's library of arrangements. It was so popular that he licensed the King Instrument Company to manufacture and market the device.

McCoy developed the signature "wah-wah" sound in the late 1920s by combining a Pixie mute and a Plunger mute in the bell of his trumpet. In 1967, a similar effect was made for electric guitar with the introduction of the Vox Clyde McCoy Wah-Wah Pedal (Clyde's name was only used for promotion and Clyde had nothing to do with the use or development of the pedal), the most significant guitar effect of its time. The Wah-wah pedal was invented by a young engineer named Brad Plunkett, who worked for the Thomas Organ Company, Vox/JMI's U.S. counterpart. The wah circuit basically sprang from the 3-position midrange voicing function used on the Vox Super Beatle amplifier.

Vox cleverly packaged the circuit into an enclosure with a rocker pedal attached to the pot (which controlled the frequency of the resonant peak) and named the new device after Clyde McCoy. Early versions of the Clyde McCoy pedal featured an image of McCoy on the bottom panel, which soon gave way to his signature only before Thomas Organ changed the name of the pedal to Cry Baby. Thomas Organ's failure to trademark the Cry Baby name soon led to the market being flooded with Cry Baby imitations from various parts of the world, including Italy, where the McCoy pedals were originally made.

== Partial filmography ==
- A Midnight Bell (1921)
- The Idle Class (1921) (extra)
