= Sugar Blues (song) =

Single by Leona Williams and Her Dixie Band
- B-side: "The Meanest Man in the World (Milady's Blues)"
- Written: 1919
- Published: 1923
- Released: September 1922
- Recorded: August 19, 1922
- Genre: Blues
- Length: 2:55
- Label: Columbia
- Composer: Clarence Williams
- Lyricist: Lucy Fletcher

"Sugar Blues" is a song written in 1919 by Clarence Williams with words by Lucy Fletcher. It was recorded for the first time by Leona Williams and her Dixie Band in August 1922. Sara Martin recorded it with Williams at the piano later that year. It was later recorded by Bob Wills and his Texas Playboys, Fats Waller, and Ella Fitzgerald with Chick Webb and his Orchestra (1939) and others.

The song became popular in 1936 as the trumpeter Clyde McCoy's theme song, featuring the sound of the growling wah-wah mute. As an instrumental, it was also recorded by Count Basie, Johnny Mercer, the Preservation Hall Jazz Band, Berl Olswanger and his Orchestra.

I got those sugar blues,
Everybody's singing those sugar blues,
The whole town is ringing;
My lovin' mama, sweet as she can be,
But the doggone gal turned sour on me!
I'm so unhappy, I feel so bad,
I could lay me down and die;
You can say what you choose,
But I'm all confused;
I've got those sweet, sweet sugar blues,
More sugar,
I got those sweet, sweet sugar blues!
