= A Kiss for Cinderella =

Theatrical comedy

Hilda Trevelyan and Gerald du Maurier in Act 2

A Kiss for Cinderella is a stage comedy – described by the author as "a fancy" – by J. M. Barrie. It was first produced in the West End on 16 March 1916, starring Hilda Trevelyan and Gerald du Maurier, running 156 performances. It was later seen on Broadway, starring Maude Adams. Several West End revivals followed. In 1925 it was made into a silent feature film.

== Background ==
Barrie had become a successful playwright in 1892 with his comedy Walker, London which ran for more than 500 performances. His subsequent theatrical successes included The Little Minister (1897, 320 performances), Quality Street (1902, 459 performances), The Admirable Crichton (1902, 328 performances), Peter Pan (1904, 145 performances), and What Every Woman Knows (1908, 384 performances).

== Premiere ==
A Kiss for Cinderella was first presented at Wyndham's Theatre, London on 16 March 1916, with the following cast:

- Mr Bodie – O. B. Clarence
- Our Policeman – Gerald du Maurier
- Miss Thing – Hilda Trevelyan
- Man with a Coat – J. W. Macdonald
- Mrs Maloney – Alma Ellerslie
- A Proud Wile – Elspeth Douglas-Reid
- A Coster – Ernest Graham
- Marie Thérèse – Violette Kemplen
- Gladys – Babs Farren
- Delphine – Alma Bersey
- Gretchen – Sunday Wilshin
- A Godmother – Stella Campbell
- Lord Mayor – Lyston Lyle
- Lord Times – T. Gideon Warren
- The Censor – D. E. Jefferies
- A King – William Lugg
- A Queen – Edith Johnston
- A Prince – Gerald du Maurier
- A Page – Ronald Hammond
- A Penguin – F. Mortimer
- A Maid – Beatrice Fitzgerald
- Doctor Bodie – Henrietta Watson
- Danny – A. E. George
- A Probationer – Elizabeth Pollock

== Plot ==
=== Act One ===
O. B. Clarence, Hilda Trevelyan and Gerald du Maurier, 1916

In First World War London, German Zeppelin raids are going on. Mr Bodie, a middle-aged artist of independent means, is visited in his studio by a policeman who wants to admonish him about showing a light in the blackout and to ask about suspicious activities on the part of his cleaning girl. She is in her teens, and her name is apparently Jane Thing, but Bodie renamed her Cinderella for her bravery and sweetness amid the drudgery of her job. She had not heard the story of Cinderella before Bodie so named her, but has now read it and identifies with the character; she thinks Bodie has called her that for her small feet. The policeman suspects her because she collects wooden boards, asks questions about the royals and knows German words. He observes her from hiding when she comes in, then emerges and talks to her. He is diverted from his suspicions by her talk, and ends by addressing her contention that she is a nobleman's daughter by giving her his "infallible" test; it proves her to be "common clay", because a lady hides her treasures in her bodice and a common girl puts hers in her pocket. When she leaves to go home, he follows her.

=== Act Two ===
On a snowy night, in Cinderella's poor street, she is in her room. She earns pennies from her neighbours by sewing, healing and morale-bolstering jobs. She used her boards to build boxes which are fastened to the wall several feet up. The policeman finds out that these are the safe havens for four little children, war orphans of various nationalities, one of whom is German, hence her learning the words. He leaves satisfied. Cinderella believes that this is the night when she will go to the ball – she has arbitrarily decided this because it has to be some time – and, after putting the awed children to bed, she steps outside so that her fairy godmother will not miss the house.

The fairy godmother duly arrives, wearing a Red Cross uniform, and grants Cinderella's three wishes: to go to her ball, to help nurse the wounded, and to gain the love of the man of her heart. The ball follows. It is a working-class girl's vision of utmost splendour: everything is gilded and ceremonious, but everyone from the King and Queen on down speaks and acts informally. The children are there in a special balcony to see Cinderella's triumph. The Prince, who resembles the Policeman but is a bored cad, judges the marriageable girls at the ball in the manner of a horse show, including having their temperatures taken to see who is morally good. When Cinderella arrives, dressed splendidly in a gown of inexpensive fabric, he is still bored and rude as she passes the thermometer test, but when she shows him her feet he is instantly transformed into a true lover filled with all the virtues. They are married by the stuffed penguin in Bodie's studio, who is a bishop, and dance, but midnight strikes and Cinderella's splendour vanishes. The ballroom dissolves, and she is seen to be lying asleep on her doorstep in the snow, near death from freezing.

=== Act Three ===
In a country house which has been taken over as a nursing home for wounded soldiers, Bodie's sister, Dr Bodie, tends Cinderella, whom the policeman has found and taken to the hospital and whom Bodie has got into his sister's care. He is looking after her orphans. He comes to see her, and hears from Dr Bodie with dismay that she has little chance of getting well. She is weak and confined to a bed on casters, but is making bandages to help nurse the wounded and is charming all the other patients and nurses. She rejoices in having enough to eat for the first time, and admits that she now, with enough food in her, knows she is not really the Cinderella. She has tea with an orderly who was a plumber in civilian life and a young daughter of the upper classes who is an eager though incompetent nurses' aide; the latter two agree that their friendship is one of the best things in their lives and they will not have as much fun when class separates them after the war. The policeman comes to visit, and Cinderella produces the letter he has written her, which she treasures, from her bodice. He asks her to marry him, and, when she says yes, presents her with a specially made pair of glass slippers instead of a ring. But when he embraces her, he turns his face away because "Dr Bodie has told him something."

== Revivals and film adaptation ==
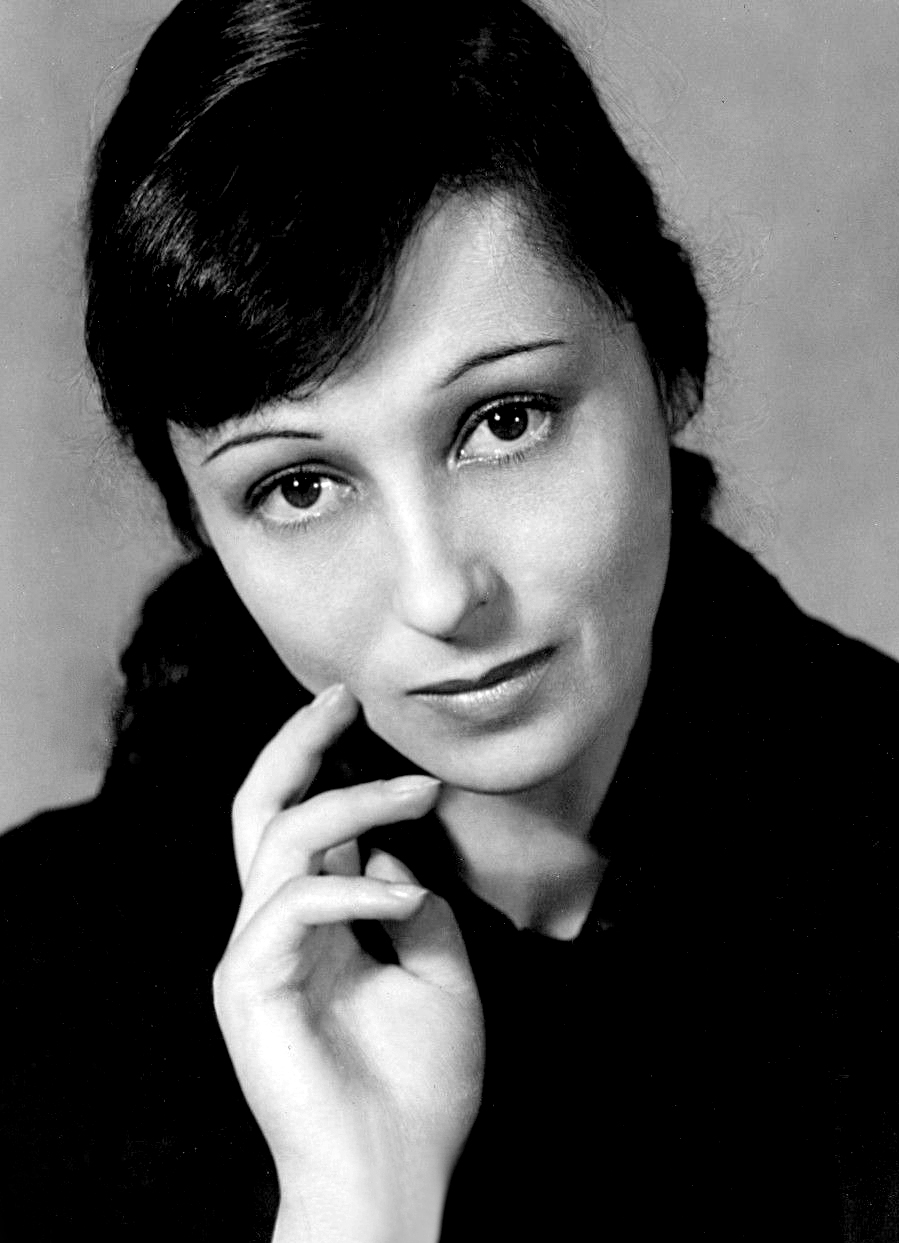
Luise Rainer as Miss Thing in the 1942 Broadway revival of A Kiss for Cinderella

A Kiss for Cinderella was given on Broadway at the Empire Theatre from December 1916 to May 1917 (152 performances) starring Maude Adams as Miss Thing.

The play had four West End revivals. Trevelyan starred in the first three: at the Kingsway Theatre in December 1916; the Queen's in December 1917; and the Haymarket in December 1924. A revival at the Phoenix in December 1937 starred Glynis Johns and Sebastian Shaw.

The play was revived in New York in 1942, with Luise Rainer as Miss Thing and Ralph Forbes as the policeman and the prince.

A Kiss for Cinderella was filmed for Paramount, directed by Herbert Brenon and starring Betty Bronson.
