= The Squire of Dames =

American play by R. C. Carton

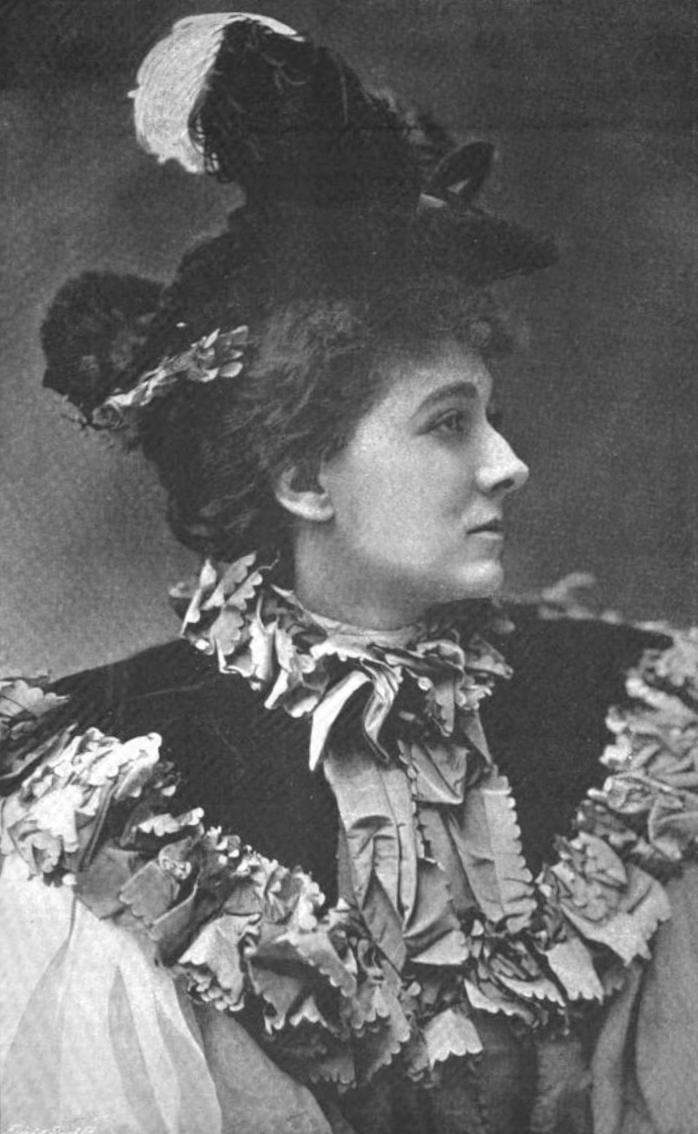
Mary Moore in The Squire of Dames at the Criterion Theatre, 1896

The Squire of Dames is an American play by R. C. Carton. It is an adaptation of L'Ami des Femmes by Alexandre Dumas fils. It was featured on Broadway in 1896 and starred Maude Adams.
