= The Imprudent Young Couple =

The Imprudent Young Couple is a play written by Henry Guy Carleton. It premiered on Broadway in 1895 and was produced by Charles Frohman. It starred Maude Adams and John Drew, Jr., and featured Arthur Byron. The production marked the Broadway debut of Drew's niece, Ethel Barrymore.

== Sources ==
Peters, Margot (1990). The House of Barrymore. New York, NY: Touchstone. ISBN 978-0-671-74799-2.
