= Louise Boynton =

American newspaper publisher and editor (1868–1951)

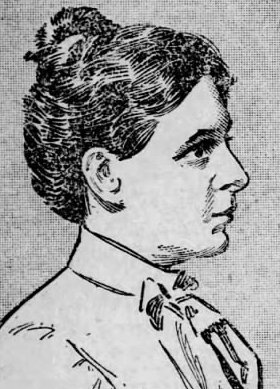
- Louise Boynton, from a 1901 newspaper.
- Born: Mary Louise Boynton; 1868; Georgetown, Massachusetts
- Died: March 3, 1951 (aged 82–83); Tannersville, New York
- Occupations: Newspaper publisher, editor
- Partner: Maude Adams
- Relatives: Georgie Boynton Child (sister)

Mary Louise Boynton (1868 – March 3, 1951) was an American newspaper publisher and editor. She was the personal secretary and partner of actress Maude Adams.

== Early life ==
Louise Boynton was born in Georgetown, Massachusetts, the eldest child of Casimir Whitman Boynton and Eunice Adelia Harriman Boynton. She graduated from Vassar College in 1894.

== Career ==
In 1897, Boynton and her sister Georgie bought a New Jersey newspaper, the Perth Amboy Republican, and ran it as a daily newspaper until 1903, with Louise Boynton as editor in chief. She was credited as editor of her sister's 1914 book, The Efficient Kitchen, and the sisters co-wrote a book of economical recipes, The Golden Grains (1932).

From 1905, Boynton was closely associated with actress Maude Adams, usually described as her personal secretary. A 1913 profile of Adams in Good Housekeeping elaborated, calling Boynton "a companion who is consulted on every momentous question of costume or farm produce; who is present at the trial of every stage effect and is the companion of every country drive; a true helpmeet in the small things of life as well as in the large."

== Personal life ==
Boynton and Adams lived and traveled together from 1905 until Boynton's death in 1951, from an apparent heart attack. Their graves are under a shared headstone, on the grounds of the Cenacle Convent in Ronkonkoma, Long Island.
