= The Masked Ball =

1892 play by Clyde Fitch

The Masked Ball is an American play written by Clyde Fitch. It was featured on Broadway in 1892 at Palmer's Theatre and starred Maude Adams. In 1900, the play was produced in London at the Criterion Theatre and featured a cast with Ellaline Terris, Herbert Standing, and Fanny Brough.
