= The Paymaster =

American play by Duncan B. Harrison

The Paymaster is an American military melodrama by, and originally starring, Duncan B. Harrison. It was presented at Niblo's Garden on Broadway in 1888 and featured Maude Adams in her first acting role at the age of 16. Adams had briefly been cast in the part of the heroine in an earlier part of the play's run, but was re-cast as in a minor role as a maidservant,.
