= The Legend of Leonora =

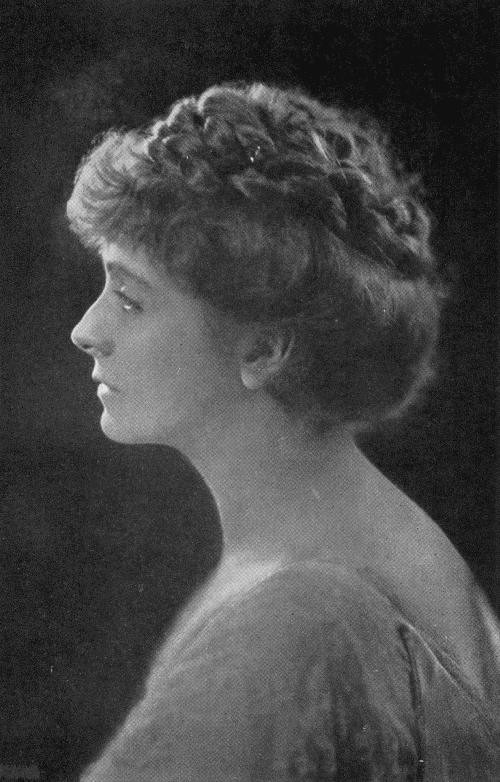
Maude Adams in The Legend of Leonora (1914)

The Legend of Leonora is a play by J. M. Barrie. It was featured on Broadway at the Empire Theatre in January 1914 and starred Maude Adams, running for 136 performances. The play first appeared briefly in London in September 1913 under the title The Adored One.

Grace George played Leonora in a 1927 revival of the play at the Ritz Theatre that ran for 16 performances.

== Original Broadway cast ==
- Mr. Justice Grimdyke by Arthur Lewis
- Sir Roderick Peripety by Morton Selten
- Captain Rattry, R.N. by Aubrey Smith
- Mr. Tovey by Fred Tyler
- Mr. Lebetter by R. Peyton Carter
- Railway Guard by Byron Silvers
- Foreman of Jury by Arthur Fitzgerald
- Juryman by Wallace Jackson
- Juryman by James L. Carhart
- Messenger by Edwin Wilson
- Clerk by William Barton
- Usher by Stafford Windsor
- Policeman by George B. Hubbard
- Leonora by Maude Adams
- Lady Peripety by Elise Clarens
- Mrs. Tovey by Leonora Chippendale
- Maid by Mary Murray
