= Proctor's Theatre (Chelsea, Manhattan) =

Theater in New York City, United States

Coordinates: 40.7438°N 73.9943°W

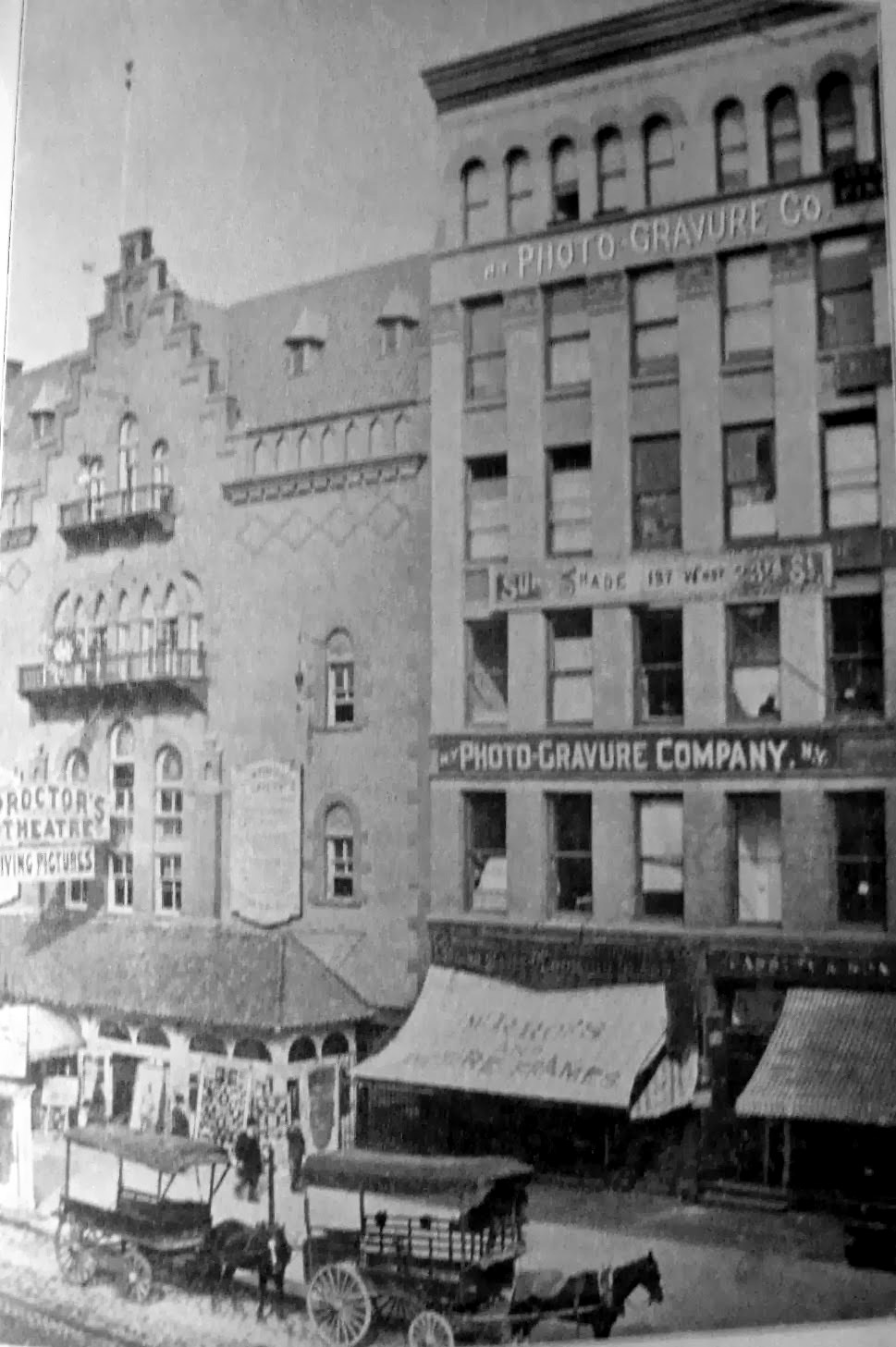
Proctor's Theatre

Proctor's Theatre, also known as Proctor's Twenty-Third Street Theatre, RKO Proctor's Twenty-Third Street Theatre and Keith & Proctor's Twenty-Third Street Theatre, was a theatre located in Chelsea, Manhattan at 141 West 23rd St. in-between Sixth Avenue and Seventh Avenue.

== History ==
It was built in 1889 by the theatrical impresario F. F. Proctor on the former site of Salmi Morse's Temple Theatre which was demolished in 1888. The theatre was designed by architect H. Edward Fickens and had a seating capacity of 1,717 people. The theater was used for both legitimate theatre and vaudeville entertainments before being purchased by RKO and becoming exclusively a movie theatre in 1907. A fire in 1937 forced the theatre to close permanently.

== Notable productions ==
- Shenandoah (1889) (transferred from Star Theatre)
- Men and Women (1890)
- The Lost Paradise (1891) (last play by Henry Churchill de Mille)
