= The Pretty Sister of Jose (play) =

The Pretty Sister of Jose is an American play. It was featured on Broadway in 1903. It was written by Frances Hodgson Burnett and starred Maude Adams. It was made into a 1914 silent film by Adolph Zukor of Paramount Pictures and starred Marguerite Clark and Jack Pickford, brother of Clark rival Mary Pickford. The film of Pretty Sister of Jose appears to be lost.
