= Daniel Harkins =

American actor

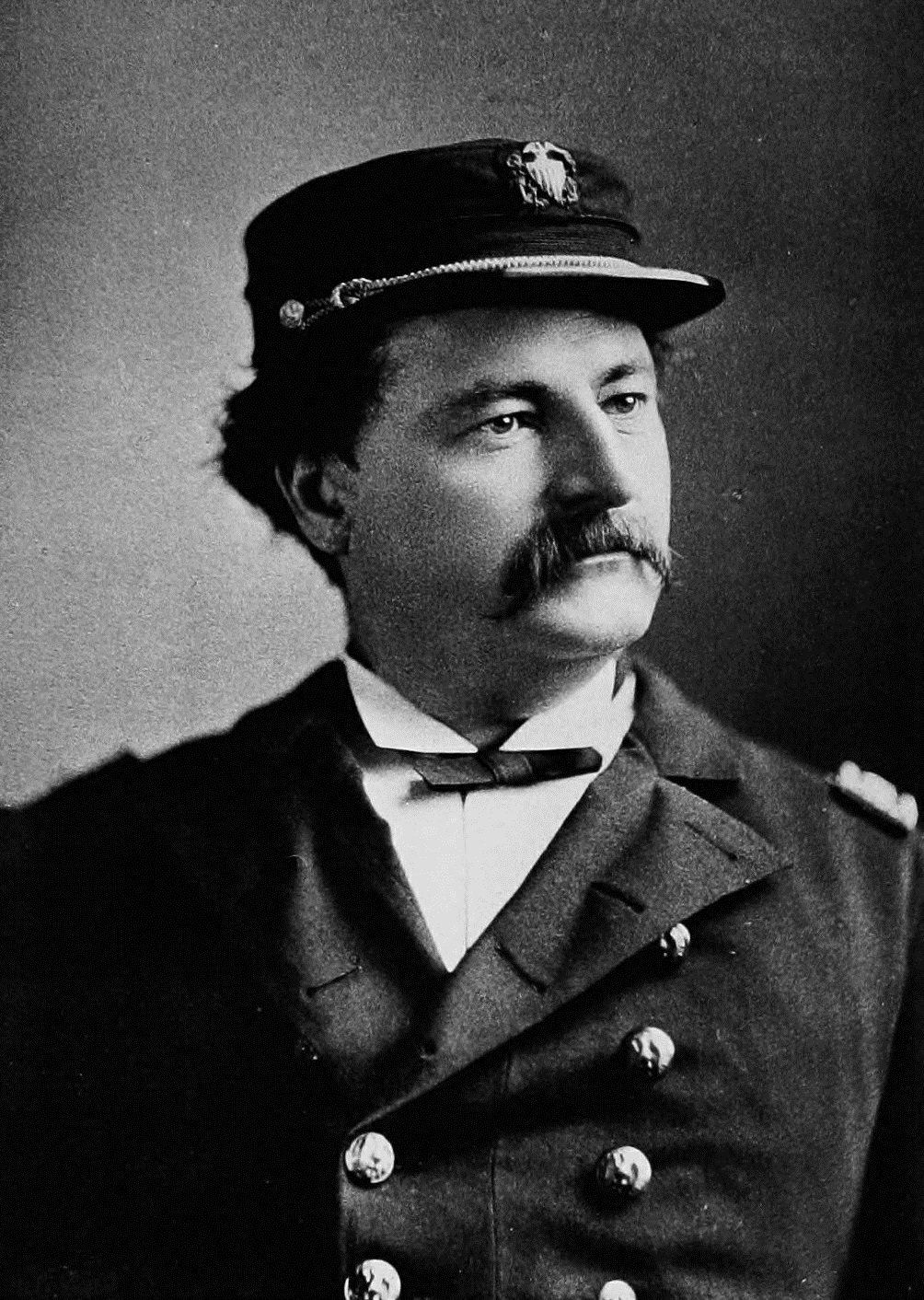
- Harkins in 1875
- Born: April 27, 1836; Boston, Massachusetts, US
- Died: December 7, 1902 (aged 66); San Francisco, California, US
- Occupation: Actor
- Years active: 1853–1902

Daniel Howard Harkins (April 27, 1836 – December 7, 1902) was an American stage actor. His career spanned almost 50 years and included performances around the world. He also served as a Union officer during the American Civil War.

== Career ==
Harkins began his acting career in 1853 in Chicago, appearing at the theater of John Blake Rice. In 1854, he moved to Philadelphia, where he performed in the stock company at the Walnut Street Theatre. In 1855, he went to New York, joining the company of actress Laura Keene. He was still in New York, performing at the Niblo's Garden theater, when the American Civil War began in 1861.

Harkins joined the Union war effort, enlisting in the army on July 16, 1861. He was made captain of Company D of the 1st Regiment New York Volunteer Cavalry. In December 1862, he was promoted to the rank of major. He was discharged from military service on October 6, 1864.

After the war, Harkins returned to the stage. In 1866, he began working with James H. Hackett and became stage manager of the New York Theatre. In August 1868, Harkins got into a business dispute involving the theatrical adaptation of the novel Foul Play. Producer Harry Palmer had obtained rights to adapt the story. Harkins had arranged with Palmer to produce the play at the New York Theatre, with financing from businessman J. T. Lloyd. Harkins would also star in the production. The arrangement went well at first, but a disagreement arose over royalty payments, which led Harkins to relocate the show to the Broadway Theatre. Lloyd, thinking he was cheated, got a local judge to issue a warrant for Harkins, which the county sheriff attempted to execute on August 24. Six armed men barged into the Broadway Theatre during a performance, failing at first to identify themselves as sheriff's officers. A confrontation ensued in which two bystanders were shot, although Harkins had fled the scene before the gunfire. The production was subsequently closed down through a court injunction.

In 1869, he became an actor and stage manager for Augustin Daly's Fifth Avenue Theatre. Albert M. Palmer briefly lured Harkins away to manage his new Union Square Theatre in 1872, but Harkins soon returned to Daly after a dispute with Palmer. He later formed his own company, touring the world before settling in San Francisco, where he performed at the California Theatre. In 1887, he returned to the road with the company of Richard Mansfield.

On April 14, 1902, Harkins appeared in the opening night of The Last Appeal at Wallack's Theatre in New York. He had trouble remembering his lines, which threw the entire show into disarray since he had a major role. Eventually, he was unable to continue. He was led off the stage, and the evening's performance was rushed to an early close. It was his last appearance on the stage.

== Personal life ==
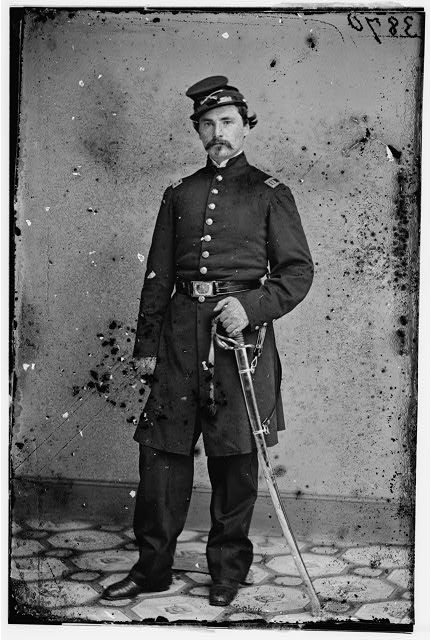
Harkins in his uniform as a Union Army major

Harkins was born in Boston, Massachusetts, on April 27, 1836. While serving in the cavalry, he married Isabella Scofield, who remained his wife until her death on August 29, 1878.

He died of a brain hemorrhage on December 7, 1902, at the home of his brother-in-law in San Francisco. He was buried in the San Francisco National Cemetery at the Presidio.

== Broadway credits ==
Appearances on Broadway were only a portion of Harkins's stage career, but his credits there include:

- Much Ado About Nothing (1869)
- Man and Wife (1870)
- Saratoga (1870)
- Jezebel (1871)
- King Richard II (1875)
- Pique (1875)
- Dr. Jekyll and Mr. Hyde (1887)
- Rosemary (1896)
- The Only Way (1899)
- Sweet Nell of Old Drury (1900)
- The Last Appeal (1902)
