= Henry Churchill de Mille =

American dramatist

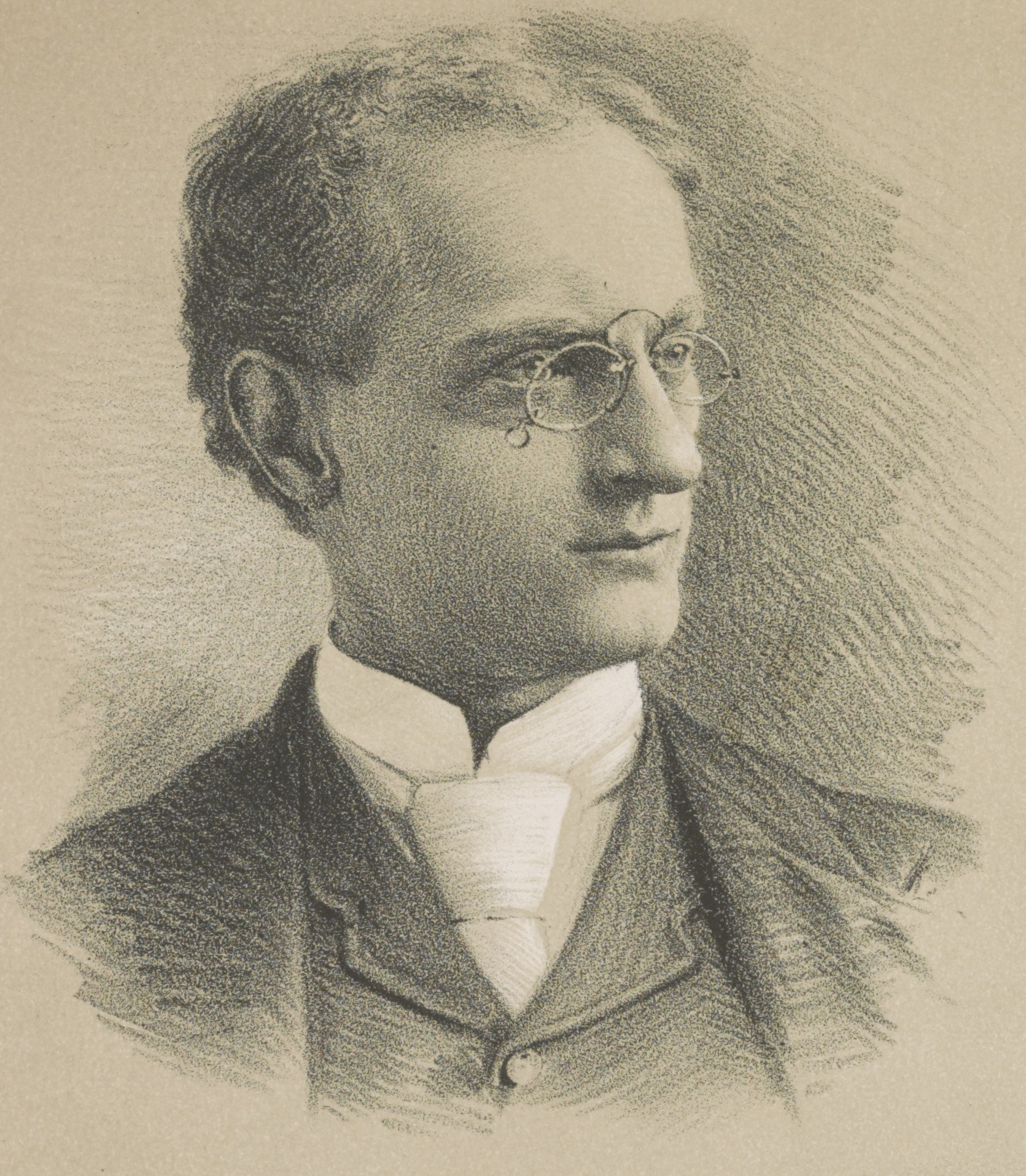
- Born: September 17, 1853; Washington, North Carolina, U.S.
- Died: February 10, 1893 (aged 39); Pompton Township, New Jersey, U.S.
- Other name: Henry C. de Mille
- Occupations: Businessman, playwright
- Spouse: Matilda Beatrice "Bebe" Samuel (m. 1876)
- Children: 3, including William C. deMille and Cecil B. DeMille
- Relatives: grandchildren: Agnes de Mille; Peggy George; Katherine DeMille; Richard de Mille

Henry Churchill de Mille (September 17, 1853 – February 10, 1893) was an American dramatist and Georgist, and the father of film pioneers Cecil B. de Mille and William C. de Mille, and the paternal grandfather of the dancer and choreographer Agnes de Mille.

== Early life ==
Henry Churchill de Mille was born on a farm at Washington, North Carolina. He was the son of businessman and politician William Edward de Mille (1824–1873) and Margaret Mutter Blount Hoyt de Mille (1835–1911). He received his BA and AM degrees from Columbia College in 1875 and 1879. He had studied for the ministry before choosing instead to become a teacher. Eventually, he served as vice-principal at the Lockwood Academy in Brooklyn. Also, he taught several semesters at the Columbia Grammar School in Manhattan.

== Theatrical career ==
He began in amateur theater and later as an actor with A. M. Palmer's organization before returning to teaching at the American Academy of Dramatic Arts. By 1882 de Mille was employed at the Madison Square Theatre reviewing and later revising submitted plays, during which he became acquainted with the playwrights Steele MacKaye and David Belasco.

On December 10, 1883, de Mille's first original play, John Delmer's Daughters, or Duty, opened at the Madison Square Theatre and closed a week later. Three years later, on September 18, 1886, Main Line, or Rawson's Y, a Western melodrama written in collaboration with Charles Barnard, opened at the old Lyceum Theatre. The play, a love story set at a remote railroad way station (complete with authentic RR tracks) and telegraph office, received warm opening night reviews. A short while later de Mille would join forces with David Belasco in a collaborative effort that would prove to have a greater box-office appeal with the theatergoing public.

Their first production was The Wife, a four-act drama that premiered at the Lyceum Theatre on November 1, 1887, under the direction of Daniel Frohman. The play was well received and at its close both authors were called upon to make their curtain call. Lord Chumley; or the Knight of Lummy Tum a three-act comedy written for E. H. Sothern was well received on August 21, 1888, and their three-act drama, The Charity Ball, another success, debuted at the Lyceum Theatre on November 19, 1889. The following season the two produced Men and Women at the Proctor's Twenty-third Street Theatre. The drama opened on October 20, 1890, and starred Maude Adams in a tale about business and politics in America.

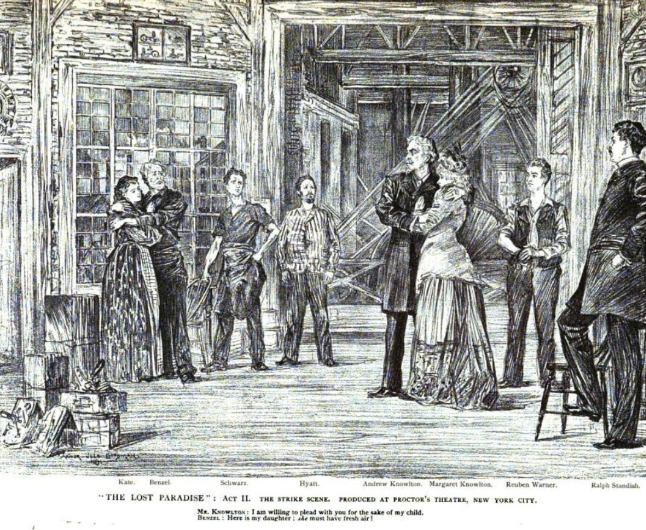
An illustration of a scene from The Lost Paradise staged at Proctor's Theatre in 1891

Belasco and de Mille chose to go their separate ways by 1891. Later that October de Mille produced The Lost Paradise, his adaptation of the Ludwig Fulda play Das Verlorene Paradies. The production by Charles Frohman's company proved to be another success and was considered to be de Mille's best work to date. As he was finishing The Lost Paradise, de Mille read Henry George's famous treatise Progress and Poverty and immediately became a dedicated Georgist "single-taxer". De Mille resolved to write a conclusion to The Lost Paradise called The Promised Land, based on the teachings of George, but de Mille died of typhoid fever less than a year later and before it could be finished.

== Marriage ==
In 1876 de Mille married Matilda Beatrice "Bebe" Samuel (1853–1923), a native of Liverpool who had come to America with her parents when she was about eighteen. Their son William C. deMille was born in 1878, Cecil B. DeMille in 1881 and daughter Agnes de Mille some ten years later.

== Death ==
While at home in Pompton, New Jersey, de Mille contracted pneumonia and died there after a brief struggle on February 10, 1893. He was survived by his wife and children, though his young daughter would fall victim to spinal meningitis just two years later. Two months after de Mille died his widow founded the Henry C. De Mille School for Girls in Pompton and opened an office on Broadway becoming only the second woman playbroker (facilitator) in America working with playwrights, producers and actors.

== Legacy ==
Today de Mille's legacy probably lies more with what influence he had over his sons. Within a decade or so of his death, de Mille's style of play writing went out of vogue and his works were largely forgotten. His demise at thirty-nine denied him the opportunity to evolve with the times and possibly be as well known today as a few of his contemporaries.
