= Annie Adams =

American actress

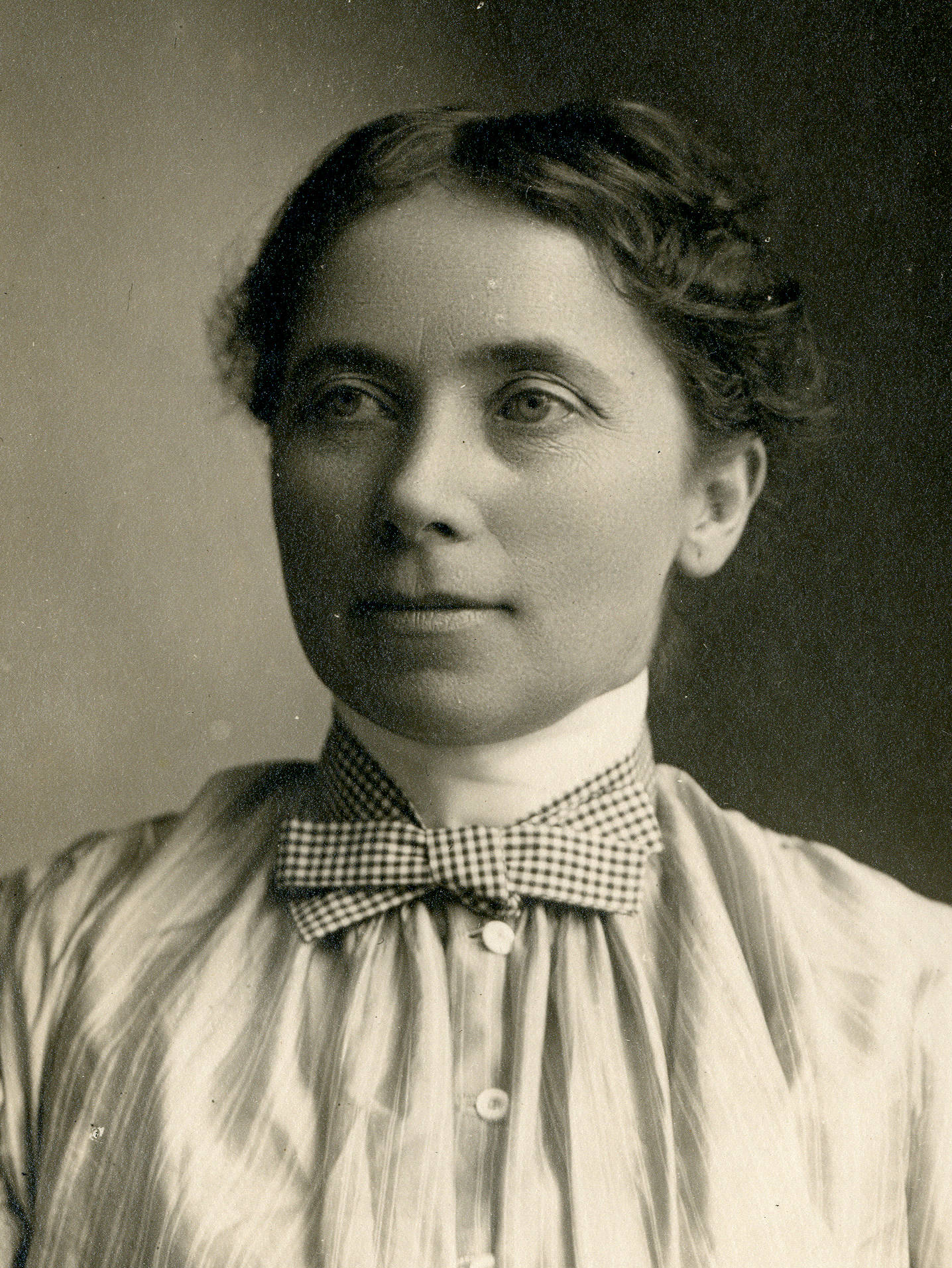
- Born: Asaneth Ann Adams; November 9, 1848; Salt Lake County, Utah, U.S.
- Died: March 17, 1916 (aged 67); Salt Lake City, Utah, U.S.
- Occupation: Actress
- Years active: 1889–1908
- Spouse: James H. Kiskadden (m. 1869; died 1883)
- Children: Maude Adams

Asaneth Ann Adams Kiskadden (November 9, 1848 – March 17, 1916), credited as Annie Adams, was an American actress who performed in Salt Lake City and later on Broadway.

== Early and personal life ==
Adams was born near Salt Lake City, the daughter of Julia Ann (née Banker) and Barnabas Lothrop Adams. Adams acted in amateur theatre as a child.

In 1869, she married James H. Kiskadden (died 1883), who was involved in banking and mining. Their only child, Maude Adams, became a prominent actress known for playing Peter Pan.

== Career ==
Adams debuted at Salt Lake Theatre as Grace Otis in Solon Shingle; or, The People's Lawyer, by Joseph Stevens Jones, in 1865. She became, for many years, the leading woman of Salt Lake Theatre. From 1889 to 1903, Adams performed in several plays on Broadway in New York City, together with her daughter, Maude Adams, sometimes as members of Charles Frohman's stock company at the Empire Theatre.

She retired from the theatre in 1908 and returned to Salt Lake City where she died.
