= Empire Theatre (40th Street) =

Former theatre in Manhattan, New York

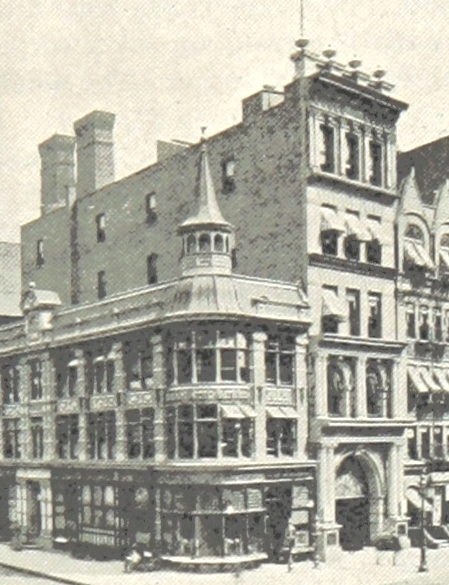
- Interactive map of Empire Theatre
- Address: 1430 Broadway (40th St.); New York City; United States
- Coordinates: 40°45′15″N 73°59′12″W
- Owner: Charles Frohman, Al Hayman
- Capacity: About 1,100

Construction
- Opened: 1893
- Demolished: 1953
- Architect: J. B. McElfatrick

The Empire Theatre in New York City was a prominent Broadway theatre in the first half of the twentieth century.

== History ==
The Empire Theatre opened in 1893 with a performance of The Girl I Left Behind Me by David Belasco. In February 1927 actress Gail Kane and others were arrested following a performance of The Captive, which was considered indecent and a violation of Section 1140A of the New York City Criminal Code.

The Empire continued to present both original plays and revivals, including the English premiere of The Threepenny Opera in 1933, until 1953. Its final show, The Time of the Cuckoo, closed May 30, 1953 after 263 performances. In the same month, the theatre hosted a benefit celebrating the sixty-year history of the Empire.

After the theatre's closure and before its demolition, Robert Porterfield salvaged many of its interior furnishings for use at the Barter Theatre in Abingdon, Virginia. Items removed by Porterfield included seats, paintings, lighting fixtures, and a lighting control system. Some of the decorations and seating that Porterfield transported are still in use at the Barter today.

== Ownership and management ==
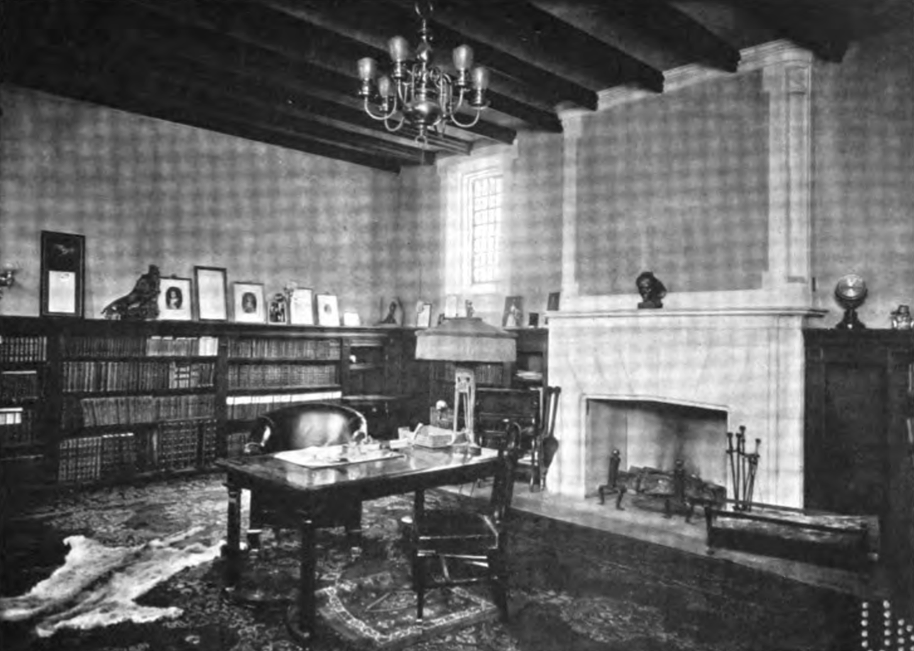
Office of Charles Frohman at the Empire Theatre

Frank Sanger and Al Hayman were the owners and developers of the uptown vacant lot that became the Empire Theatre. Hayman suggested that theatre producer Charles Frohman have the Empire Theatre built there, believing everything theatrical was moving uptown at the time.

The original lessees were listed as Charles Frohman and his partner William Harris of the firm Rich & Harris who were set to take possession of the building on January 23, 1893, which was also set to be the theatre's opening night.

The Empire Theatre's business manager was Thomas F. Shea for over 20 years from its opening till the death of Charles Frohman. After Frohman died on the RMS Lusitania in 1915, Al Hayman took over ownership of the Empire Theatre.

The theatre was sold in 1948 to the Astor estate; in 1953 it was announced that the building would be torn down to make way for an office tower.

== Building ==
Charles Frohman hired architect J. B. McElfatrick to design the Empire Theatre. Advertised as thoroughly fireproof, the building was the only stock theatre at that time to be on the ground floor and to have no steps entering from the street.

On December 2, 1892, it was reported in The New York Times that the building had been completed and was in the hands of the plasterers and decorators.

== Notable productions ==
- This list is incomplete, including selected plays that exceeded 100 performances in early years, and 200 performances in later years)
- The Girl I Left Behind Me (1893) (288 perf.)
- The Masqueraders (1894) (120 perf.)
- The Little Minister (1897) (300 perf., including run at the Garrick Theatre)
- The Conquerors (1898)
- Lord and Lady Algy (1899) (111 perf.)
- The Tyranny of Tears (1899) (by Charles Haddon Chambers)
- Richard Carvel (1900) (128 perf.)
- Mrs. Dane's Defense (1900) (107 perf.)
- Peter Pan (1905) (223 perf.)
- What Every Woman Knows (1908) (198 perf.)
- The Legend of Leonora (1914) (136 perf.)
- A Kiss for Cinderella (1916) (152 perf.)
- Déclassée (1919) (257 perf.)
- Call the Doctor (1920) (127 perf).
- Mary Rose (1920) (127 perf.)
- The Czarina (1922) (136 perf.)
- Grounds for Divorce (1924) (127 perf.)
- Easy Virtue (1925) (147 perf.)
- The Captive (1926) (160 perf.)
- Her Cardboard Lover (1927) (152 perf.)
- Interference (1927) (224 perf.)
- The Age of Innocence (1928) (207 perf.)
- The Barretts of Wimpole Street (1931) (370 perf.)
- Dangerous Corner (1932) (206 perf.)
- The Old Maid (1935) (305 perf.)
- The Star-Wagon (1937) (223 perf.)
- Life with Father (1939–1945) (moved theaters in 1945 and ran through 1947 for 3224 shows, the longest run on Broadway to that time)
- O Mistress Mine (1946) (452 perf.)
- Life With Mother (1948) (265 perf.)
- The Member of the Wedding (1950) (501 perf.)
- I Am a Camera (1951) (214 perf.)
- The Time of the Cuckoo (1952) (263 perf.) (last play before theatre was demolished)
