= Madame Butterfly (disambiguation) =

Madama Butterfly is an opera by Puccini.

Madame Butterfly may also refer to:

== Related to the opera ==
- "Madame Butterfly" (short story), an 1898 story by John Luther Long
- Madame Butterfly (play), a 1900 play by David Belasco based on the short story; basis for the opera
- Madame Butterfly (1915 film), an American silent film by Sidney Olcott
- Harakiri (1919 film) or Madame Butterfly, a German silent film by Fritz Lang
- Madame Butterfly (1932 film), an American film by Marion Gering
- Madame Butterfly (1939 film), an Italian-German film by Carmine Gallone
- Madame Butterfly (1954 film), an Italian-Japanese musical film
- Madame Butterfly (Wednesday Theatre), a 1967 Australian television film
- "Madame Butterfly" (song), a 1984 song by Malcolm McLaren
- M. Butterfly, a 1988 play by David Henry Hwang
- M. Butterfly (film), a 1993 film by David Cronenberg based on the play by Hwang
- Madame Butterfly (1995 film), a film by Frédéric Mitterrand

== People with the nickname ==
- Theresa LePore, Florida politician who designed a butterfly ballot used in the 2000 US presidential election
- Susie O'Neill (born 1973), Australian swimmer

== Other uses ==
- Madam Butterfly (album), a 1979 album by Tavares
