= Armando Bini =

Italian opera singer

Armando Bini (Pisa, October 1, 1887 – Milan, October 31, 1954) was an Italian tenor opera singer.

== Career ==
Bini was a plumber before his music teacher, Professor Antoni, directed him to sing his first song and encouraged him to study music. After military service, he had the chance to debut at the Teatro Carcano in Milan in 1914, in the role of Fernando in Donizetti's La Favorita. In the same year, as requested by the organizers he performed in Donizetti's Don Pasquale and Rossini's Barber of Seville, in the role of Almaviva.

From there Bini's career blossomed, taking him to sing in theaters throughout Italy, including the National Theater of Florence, Milan, Bari and Pisa. In 1931, he interpreted Pinkerton in Madama Butterfly alongside soprano Miura Tamaki at the Teatro Verdi. In Pisa he was also active in several productions of Theater Politeama.

Bini also performed abroad, in Corsica in 1920 and in the Netherlands, where he was honored with the Amsterdam Knighthood of the Kingdom of the Netherlands.
