= Madame Butterfly (play) =

1900 play by David Belasco

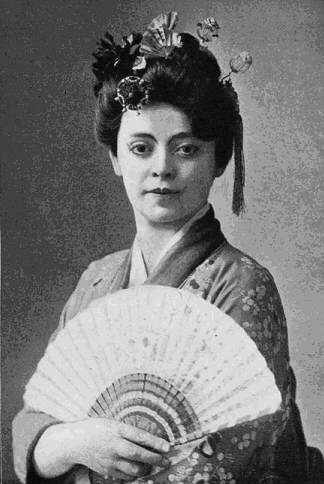
Valerie Bergere as Cho Cho San (ca. 1902).

Madame Butterfly: A Tragedy of Japan is a play in one act by David Belasco adapted from John Luther Long's 1898 short story "Madame Butterfly". It premiered on March 5, 1900, at the Herald Square Theatre in New York City and became one of Belasco's most famous works. The play and Long's short story served as the basis for the libretto of Puccini's 1904 opera, Madama Butterfly. The title role was originally played in New York and London by Blanche Bates; in 1900–01 in New York by Valerie Bergere; and in 1913 by Clara Blandick.

== Production ==
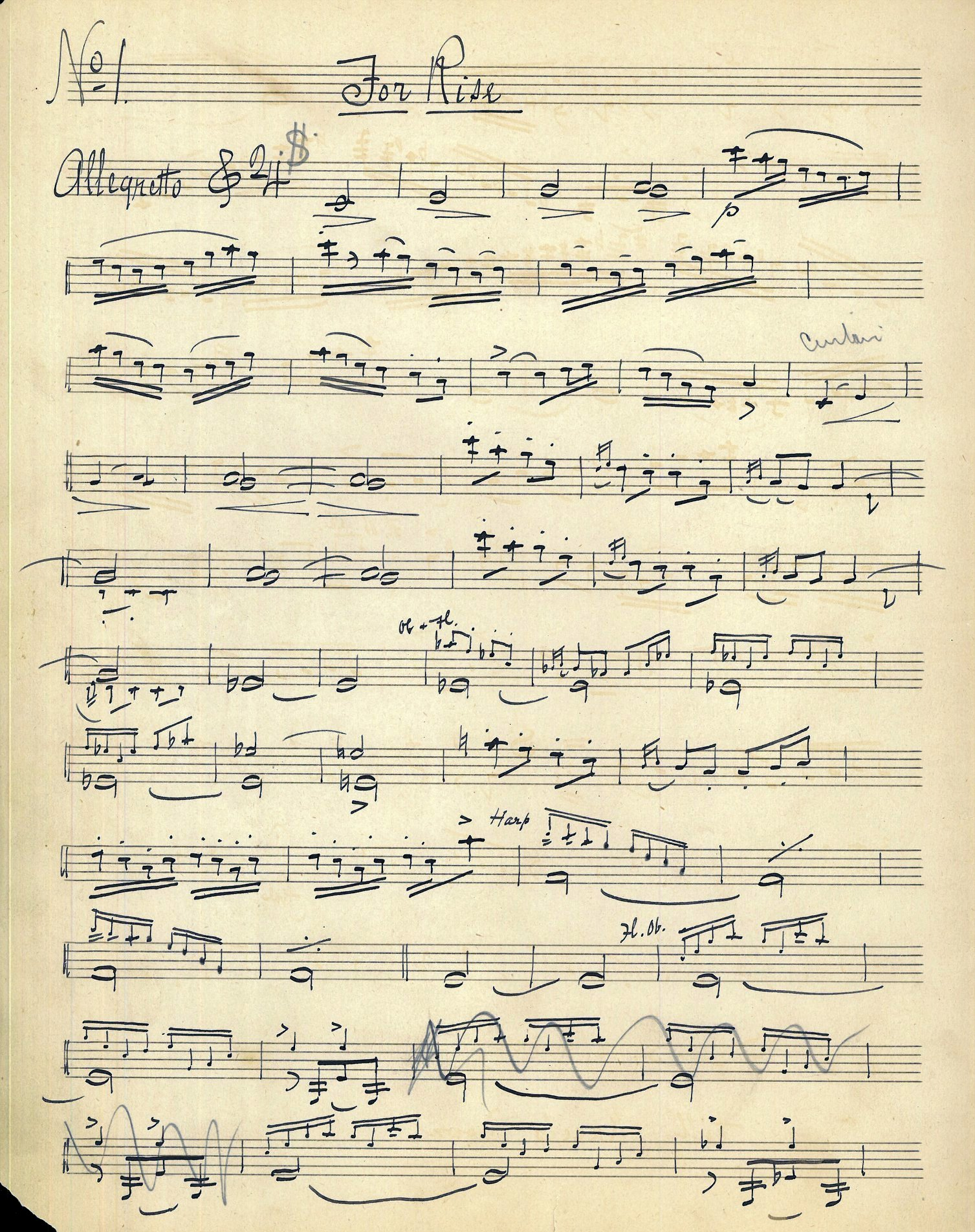
Page one of the first violin part of incidental music for Madame Butterfly by William Furst

Madame Butterfly was first performed March 5, 1900, at the Herald Square Theatre in New York City, after the curtain raiser Naughty Anthony. The play was written and produced by David Belasco, with scenic design by Ernest Gros; incidental music was composed by William Furst.

=== Cast ===
- Blanche Bates as Cho-Cho-San
- Claude Gillingwater as Mr. Sharpless
- Frank Worthing as Lieut. B. F. Pinkerton
- Albert Bruning as Yamadori.
- E. P. Wilks as Nakado
- Mary Barker as Suzuki
- Katharine Black as Kate
- Little Kittle as "Trouble"

== See also ==
- Portrayal of Asians in American theater
