= Madame Butterfly (short story) =

1898 short story by John Luther Long

- Short story by John Luther Long
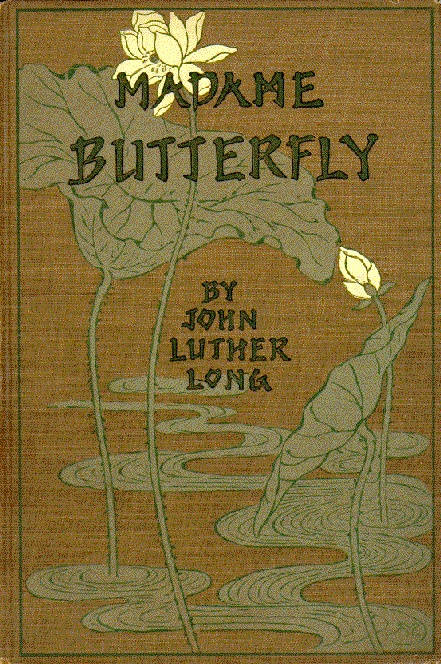
- Cover of a 1903 edition

Text available at Wikisource
- Country: United States
- Language: English
- Genre: Short story

Publication
- Published in: Century Magazine
- Publication type: Periodical
- Publisher: The Century Company
- Media type: Magazine
- Publication date: 1898
- Pages: 19

"Madame Butterfly" is a short story by American lawyer and writer John Luther Long. It is based on the recollections of Long's sister, Jennie Correll, who had been to Japan with her husband, a Methodist missionary. It was first published in Century Magazine in 1898 and adapted for the stage in 1900. Giacomo Puccini based his 1904 opera Madama Butterfly on the play.

== Plot ==
US Navy Lieutenant Benjamin Franklin Pinkerton arrives in Nagasaki. He leases a house for 999 years and marries a 15-year old geisha, Cho-Cho-San. Pinkerton bans her family from visiting, and they disown her. Nevertheless, she feels she is "the mos' bes' happy female woman in Japan—mebby in that whole world".

Pinkerton's duties take him away from Nagasaki, but he promises to return "when the robins nest again". Cho-Cho-San has faith that he will return and bears their baby. She names him Trouble.

A marriage broker harangues Cho-Cho-San to take a new husband. He warns that if Pinkerton does return it will probably only be to retrieve his child. He introduces her to a prince named Yamadori who tells Cho-Cho-San that Pinkerton never viewed their marriage as permanent. Yamadori offers to marry Cho-Cho-San and help her keep Trouble.

Cho-Cho-San visits the American consul, Mr. Sharpless. As Sharpless learns the full scope of Pinkerton's actions, he grows ashamed and contemptuous of the officer. Sharpless encourages her to marry Yamadori.

Several weeks later, Pinkerton's ship arrives. Cho-Cho-San has been keeping a faithful watch for it and is overcome with emotion. Her maid Suzuki helps prepare the house with flowers and arrange Pinkerton's things the way he remembered them. Cho-Cho-San wears her finest kimono and hides behind a shoji to watch Pinkerton's arrival. She waits all night to no avail.

A week later, a civilian ship arrives. Cho-Cho-San spies Pinkerton on deck with a blonde woman. She keeps another fruitless vigil waiting for her husband's homecoming. When Pinkerton's ship leaves the harbor, Cho-Cho-San returns to Sharpless' office. Desperate to avoid inflicting more pain, Sharpless lies to Cho-Cho-San. He tells her that Pinkerton was ordered to China and could not return to her. Sharpless offers her an envelope full of money.

The blonde woman from the steamship bursts into the office and identifies herself as Pinkerton's wife. She asks Sharpless to telegram Pinkerton to say that she had been to Cho-Cho-San's house but could not find her. She asks if she can bring Trouble with her when she joins Pinkerton the following week.

Cho-Cho-San rushes home. She bids farewell to Suzuki and Trouble and shuts herself in her room to end her own life. She opens a wound in her throat and the blood drips down her chest. Suzuki silently enters the room with the baby and pinches him to make him cry. Cho-Cho-San lets the sword drop to the floor. As the baby crawls onto Cho-Cho-San's lap, Suzuki dresses her wound. When Mrs. Pinkerton returns to the house the following day it is empty.

== Historical basis ==
Long's sister Jennie Correll married a Methodist missionary and lived in Nagasaki. Through their correspondence, Long learned about the culture of Japan and various personalities that would become characters in his stories. Correll once told her brother about a "dear little teahouse girl" named "Cho-San" who was abandoned by the father of her child. He immediately turned it into a story and asked her input.

Many people have tried to deduce the identities of the characters in Long's story. Pinkerton and his friend Sayre appear in both "Madame Butterfly" and Long's 1895 novel Miss Cherry-Blossom of Tokyo. Musicologist Arthur Groos believes he tracked down the real Sayre and a likely candidate for Pinkerton. Another author speculated that Thomas Blake Glover is the man who adopted Cho-Cho-San's son, but that evidence was dismissed as "flimsy".

Pierre Loti thinly disguised himself in his 1887 novel Madame Chrysanthème. Because so much of Loti's plot reappears in Long's story, it is assumed to have been a source. However, "temporary" or "Japanese marriages" were a widespread phenomenon after the country's liberalization of marriage laws, and a Japanese woman abandoned by her foreign spouse was far from a unique occurrence. Butterfly's belief that her marriage was permanent was the deviation from the norm.

== Publication history ==
Long's story was an instant success. Just 10 months after it appeared in print, The Century Company rushed a book version to market. Appearing in October 1898, the book included several other Long stories, and began selling "like hot cakes". In 1903, Century reissued the book with several tinted photographs by C. Yarnall Abbott.

=== Gallery ===
Photogravure Illustrations by C. Yarnall Abbott for the 1903 edition of "Madame Butterfly"
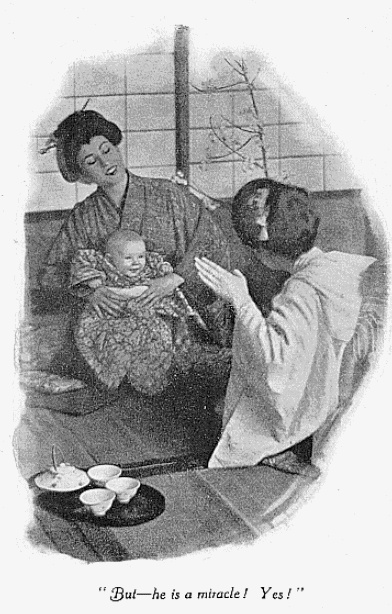
Cho-Cho-San shows her baby to Suzuki.

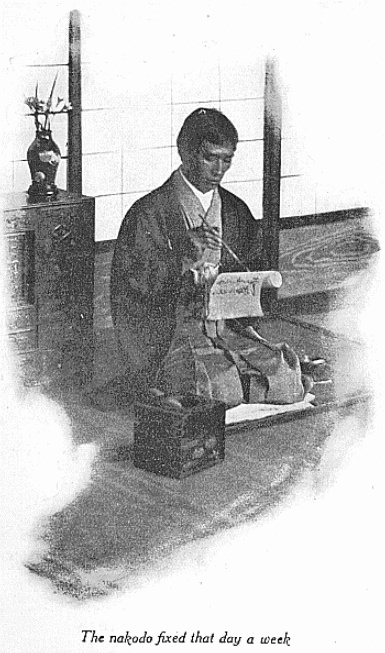
The marriage broker fixes a date for Cho-Cho-San to meet Prince Yamadori.

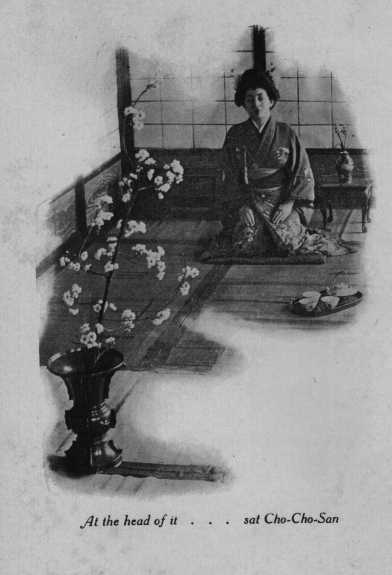
Cho-Cho-San dressed in her finery for the meeting with Yamadori.

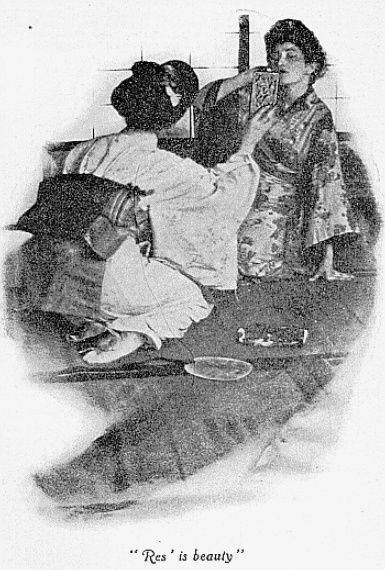
Suzuki holds up a mirror and urges Cho-Cho-San to get some rest before Pinkerton's arrival.

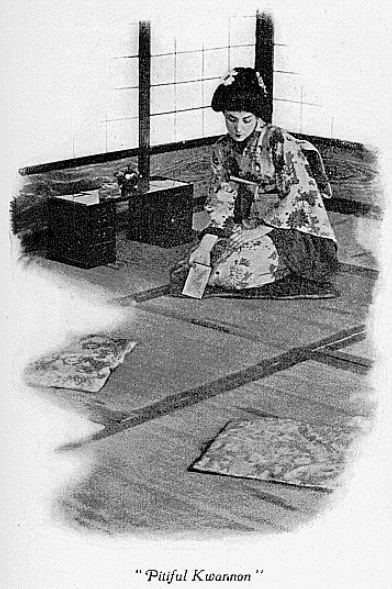
"Pitiful Kwannon!" cries Cho-Cho-San after looking in the mirror.

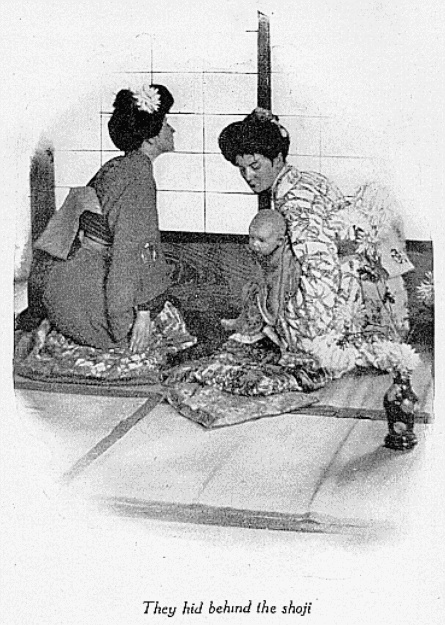
Suzuki and Cho-Cho-San hide behind a shoji as they await the arrival of Pinkerton.

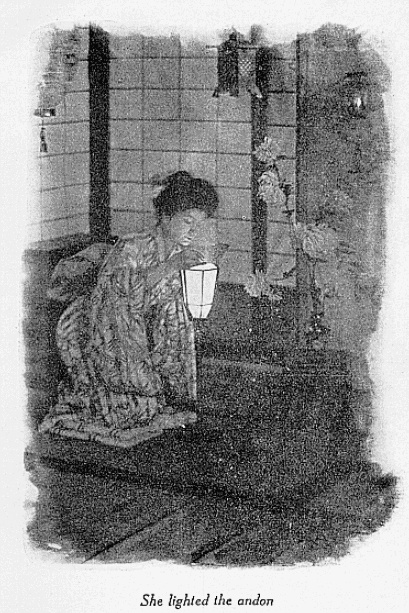
As night falls and Pinkerton fails to arrive, Cho-Cho-San lights a paper lantern.

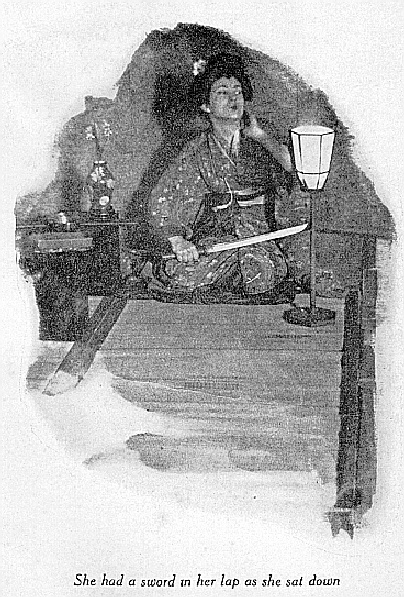
With a sword in her lap, Cho-Cho-San prepares to take her own life.

== Adaptations ==
=== Plays ===
The story interested American playwright David Belasco who collaborated with Long on a one-act adaptation. Madame Butterfly: A Tragedy of Japan premiered in New York's Herald Square Theatre on March 5, 1900 with Blanche Bates in the title role. Seven weeks later, Belasco took it to London's Duke of York's Theatre where it played to full houses and critical acclaim. Evelyn Millard played Madame Butterfly. Back in America, Belasco toured the play for the next two seasons.

In 1988, David Henry Hwang wrote a play entitled M. Butterfly based on the affair between French diplomat Bernard Boursicot and Peking opera singer Shi Pei Pu. He mined the sexist and racist clichés of Puccini's opera to tell the story of a Westerner who fantasized about loving a Madame Butterfly. Hwang's play was adapted into a film by David Cronenberg in 1993 and an opera by Huang Ruo in 2022.

=== Musical Theater ===
In the summer of 1900, while Giacomo Puccini was in London supervising the English premiere of Tosca, he saw David Belasco's play. He spoke very little English, but Butterfly's vigil struck him as an ideal subject for an opera. He rushed backstage to beg Belasco for permission. In April 1901, Puccini had finally settled on Butterfly as a subject and the rights were obtained. The resulting opera, Madama Butterfly, was one of Puccini's favorites and became a cornerstone of the repertoire. It premiered on February 17, 1904 at La Scala in Milan.

The 1989 stage musical Miss Saigon by Claude-Michel Schönberg and Alain Boublil, with lyrics by Boublil and Richard Maltby Jr., transfers the plot to the Vietnam War.

=== Songs ===
Long's story inspired dozens of Tin Pan Alley songs. Popular music had long been fascinated with depicting Asia and Japan in particular. At the turn of the century, Japonisme and "Madame Butterfly" became a touchstone for many songwriters. In 1900, George Hobart and Alfred Aarons retold the story in their song "O Mona San: A Tokyo Tragedy" and dedicated their work to David Belasco. "Madame Butterfly" became the archetype for orientalist songs, and its core narrative was brutally summarized by L. Wolfe Gilbert in his lyrics for "Singapore": "He leaves, she grieves."

After Puccini's opera became a hit, "Madame Butterfly" songs were legion, including by composers as famous as Irving Berlin ("Hurry Back to My Bamboo Shack") and George Gershwin ("Yan-Kee", "In the Heart of a Geisha"). "Butterfly" songs often transferred the characters to other Asian locales, like Shanghai, and it was common to leave the heroine's fate ambiguous. The most successful of all these tunes was "Poor Butterfly" (Golden/Hubbell) which became a standard. Puccini's style was an intuitive fit for Tin Pan Alley songwriters and the jazz artists who cannibalized their work. "Poor Butterfly" was such a hit that it inspired dozens of answer songs.

=== Film ===
The story has been adapted for film several times:

- Madame Butterfly (1915 film), an American silent film directed by Sidney Olcott
- Madame Butterfly, an alternative name for Harakiri (1919 film), a German silent film directed by Fritz Lang
- Le ménage moderne du Madame Butterfly (1920), a French pornographic film.
- The Toll of the Sea (1922), an American silent film directed by Chester Franklin
- Madame Butterfly (1932 film), an American film directed by Marion Gering
- Madame Butterfly (1954 film), a joint Italian-Japanese film directed by Carmine Gallone
- Madame Butterfly (1995 film), a European production directed by Frédéric Mitterrand
