= William Furst =

American composer (1852–1917)

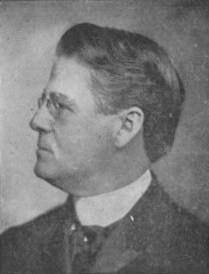
William Furst, ca. 1897

William Wallace Furst (March 25, 1852 – July 11, 1917) was an American composer of musical theatre pieces and a music director, best remembered for supplying incidental music to theatrical productions on Broadway.

== Biography ==
Furst was born in Baltimore, Maryland. He studied music in Baltimore, and was a church organist at the age of 14.

=== Career ===
Furst's comic opera Electric Light was produced and conducted by him in 1878, and for the five seasons following he received engagements as conductor of opera. By the 1880s, he was composing theatrical music for productions starring Herbert Beerbohm Tree, Maude Adams, Otis Skinner, William Faversham, Viola Allen and Mrs. Leslie Carter. He composed the music for five Shakespeare productions by Margaret Anglin at the Berkeley Stadium in California, as well as her production of Electra. One of his earliest operettas was My Geraldine (1880).

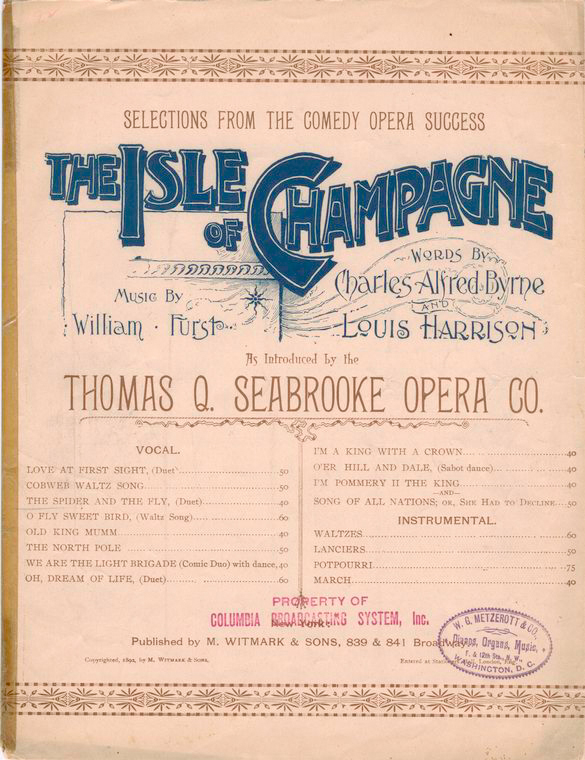
Sheet music from Furst's The Isle of Champagne

In the late 1880s and early 1890s, Furst was the orchestra director at the Tivoli Theatre in San Francisco, California. He composed his only opera, Theodora, for the Tivoli. In 1892, he composed the successful operetta The Isle of Champagne. In 1893, he published "The Girl I Left Behind Me" and moved to New York City, becoming the music director at the now-demolished Empire Theater. The same year, he composed the music (along with Charles Alfred Byrne and Louis Harrison) for the musical Miss Nicotine with Lillian Russell and Marie Dressler Another such Empire piece was The Little Trooper, starring Della Fox (1894) followed by The Little Minister (1897). In 1898, he composed another such piece for the Empire, A Normandy Wedding (an adaptation of the French Papa Gougon), which received an enthusiastic reception in New York at the Herald Square Theatre.

By 1900, Furst also had fairly steady work as a composer/arranger of incidental music to accompany theatrical productions. He produced music for, or was music director for numerous plays, including a steady stream of dramas produced by David Belasco and Charles Frohman. Two plays by Belasco which had Furst's musical accompaniments, Madame Butterfly and The Girl of the Golden West, were made into operas by Giacomo Puccini who attended their New York productions. Musicologist Allan W. Atlas has shown that Puccini modeled some music heard in his opera La fanciulla del West on Furst's music. His last theatrical composition was music for Joan the Woman, starring Geraldine Farrar.

=== Death ===
Furst died in 1917 at his home in Freeport, Long Island, New York at the age of 66. An enthusiastic gardener, Furst tripped in his garden, injuring his foot, which led to a brain clot. He was survived by his widow Charlotte and his daughter, Mrs. Lillian Martin.

== Works ==
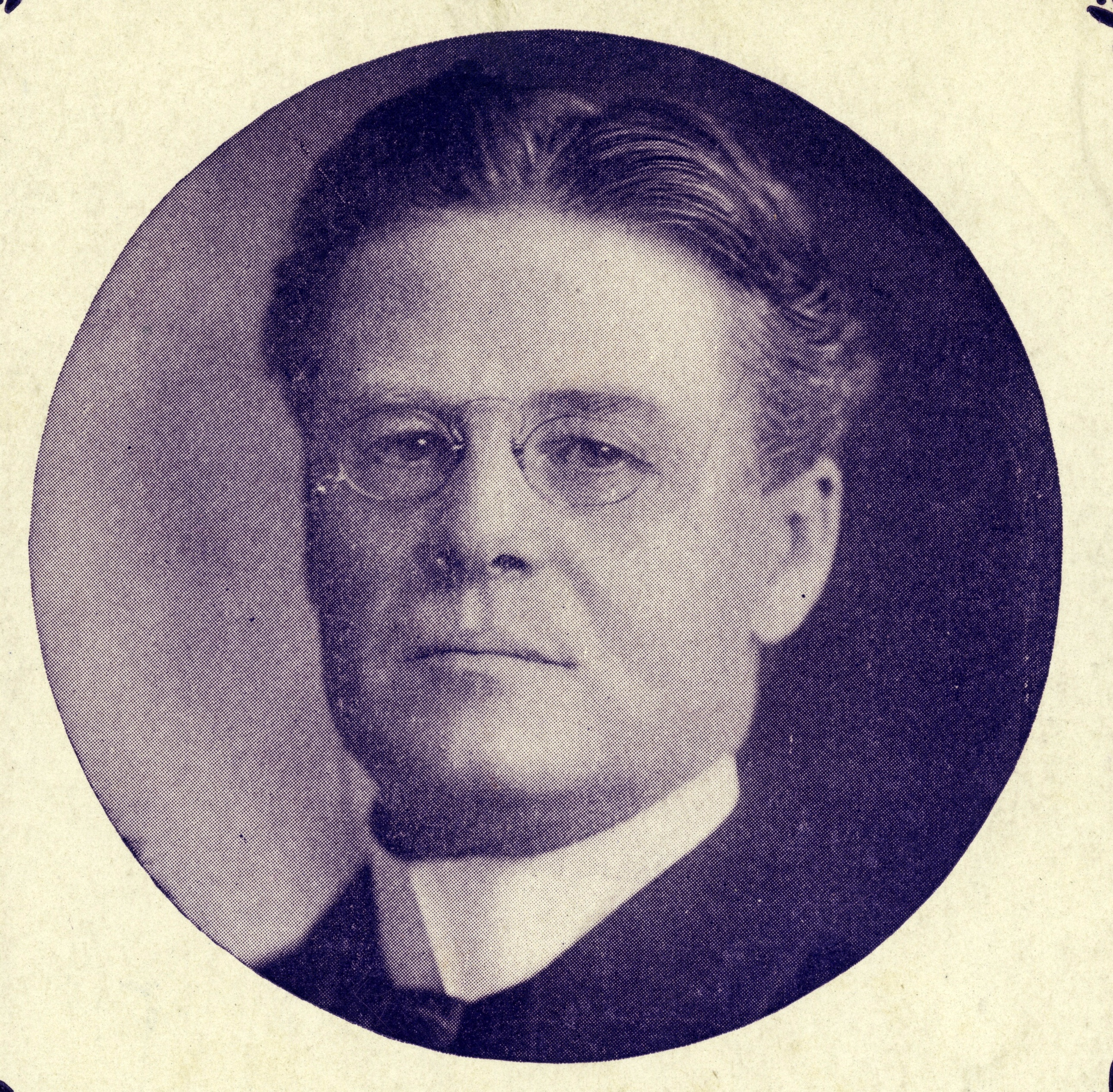
Picture of William Furst, ca. 1901

=== Musicals and operettas ===
This list may not be complete.

- 1880 My Geraldine
- 1892 The Isle of Champagne
- 1893 Princess Nicotine
- 1894 The Little Trooper
- 1895 Fleur-De-Lis
- 1897 The Little Minister
- 1898 A Normandy Wedding
- 1909 The White Sister

=== Plays with music by Furst ===
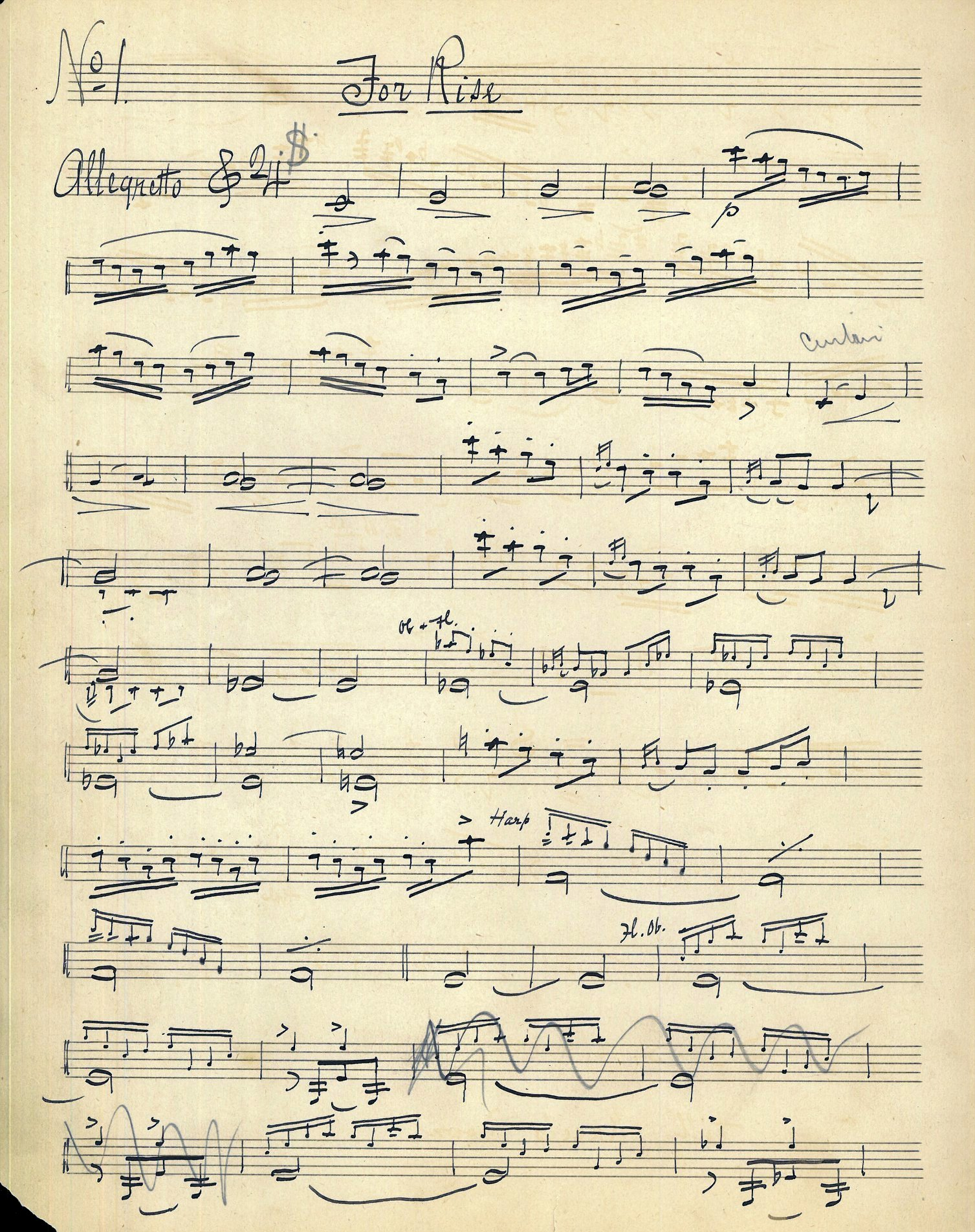
Page one of the first violin part of incidental music for Madame Butterfly by William Furst

This list may not be complete.

- 1888 She
- 1891 Miss Helyett
- 1895 The Heart of Maryland
- 1898 Christian
- 1899 Sherlock Holmes
- 1899 Barbara Frietchie
- 1900 A Royal Family
- 1900 Adventures of François
- 1900 Richard Carvel
- 1900 Lost River
- 1900 Madame Butterfly
- 1901 Brother Officers
- 1901 Colorado
- 1901 Du Barry
- 1901 Quality Street
- 1902 Iris
- 1902 The Darling of the Gods
- 1904 The Music Master
- 1905 Adrea
- 1905 The Girl of the Golden West
- 1906 Pippa Passes
- 1906 The Rose of the Rancho
- 1907 The Christian Pilgrim
- 1908 The World and His Wife
- 1908 The Winterfeast
- 1911 The Return of Peter Grimm
- 1913 Evangeline

=== Furst as conductor ===
Furst served as conductor/music director of many of the works that he composed. In addition, he is known to have conducted the following musicals and operettas:

- 1883 Green-Room Fun!
- 1893 An Artist's Model
- 1900 The Rose of Persia

=== Film music ===
- 1916 The Green Swamp
- 1916 Let Katie Do It
- 1917 Joan the Woman

== Legacy ==
Much of the music composed by William Furst remains unpublished. Since he wrote "for hire," many of his works remained with David Belasco. They now form a part of the David Belasco Collection of Incidental Music and Musicals in the Music Division of The New York Public Library for the Performing Arts. His work for Madame Butterfly and The Girl of the Golden West have been cataloged separately.
