= Harakiri (1919 film) =

- Niels Prien and Lil Dagover as O. Anderson and O-Take-San
- Directed by: Fritz Lang
- Written by: Max Jungk from the play by David Belasco and John Luther Long
- Produced by: Erich Pommer
- Starring: Lil Dagover; Paul Biensfeldt; Georg John; Meinhart Maur; Rudolf Lettinger; Erner Huebsch; Niels Prien
- Cinematography: Max Fassbender
- Distributed by: Decla-Bioscop
- Release date: December 18, 1919
- Running time: 80 minutes
- Country: Germany
- Languages: Silent film German intertitles

Harakiri, or Madame Butterfly, is a German 1919 silent film directed in Germany by Fritz Lang. It was one of the first Japanese-themed films depicting Japanese culture. The film was originally released in the United States and other countries as Madame Butterfly because of the source material on which it is based and which also inspired Giacomo Puccini's eponymous 1904 opera. The film starred Lil Dagover as O-Take-san.

== Synopsis ==
Nagasaki, Japan at the turn of the 20th century. Daimyō Tokujawa comes back to Japan after being an ambassador in Europe. A Buddhist monk wants Tokujawa's daughter O-Take-San to become a priestess of Buddha. In order to have her at his mercy, the monk sends the mikado a letter accusing the daimyo of conspiring against him. As a result, the mikado sends the daimyo a sword with which he commits suicide. The monk abducts O-Take-San but one of the Temple's servants let her escape and sends her to a tea-house where she becomes a geisha. A Danish naval officer, Olaf Anderson falls in love with her and marries her for 999 days, in accordance with Japanese custom. Shortly afterwards, Olaf Anderson goes back to his country and O-Take-San gives birth to his son. She refuses proposals of marriage from Prince Matahari because she considers herself still married to Olaf. After four years, when her marriage with Olaf has expired and her son is going to be taken by the state, Olaf comes back to Nagasaki. He is now married and when his wife learns about O-Take-San's story, she goes to see her to say that she is willing to take care of her son. O-Take-San is desperate to see that Olaf has not even come to see her and answers that she will give her son only to Olaf in person. While Olaf's wife tries to convince him to come to O-Take-San's house, O-Take-San commits harakiri with her father's sword.
