= Tamaki Miura =

Japanese singer (1884–1946)

- 三浦 環
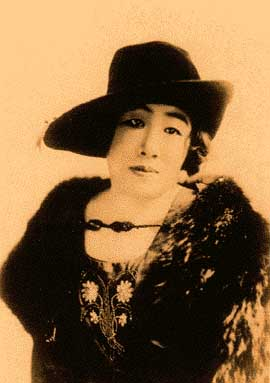
- Born: February 25, 1884; Tokyo
- Died: May 26, 1946 (aged 62); Tokyo
- Resting place: Tokyo
- Occupation: Soprano singer

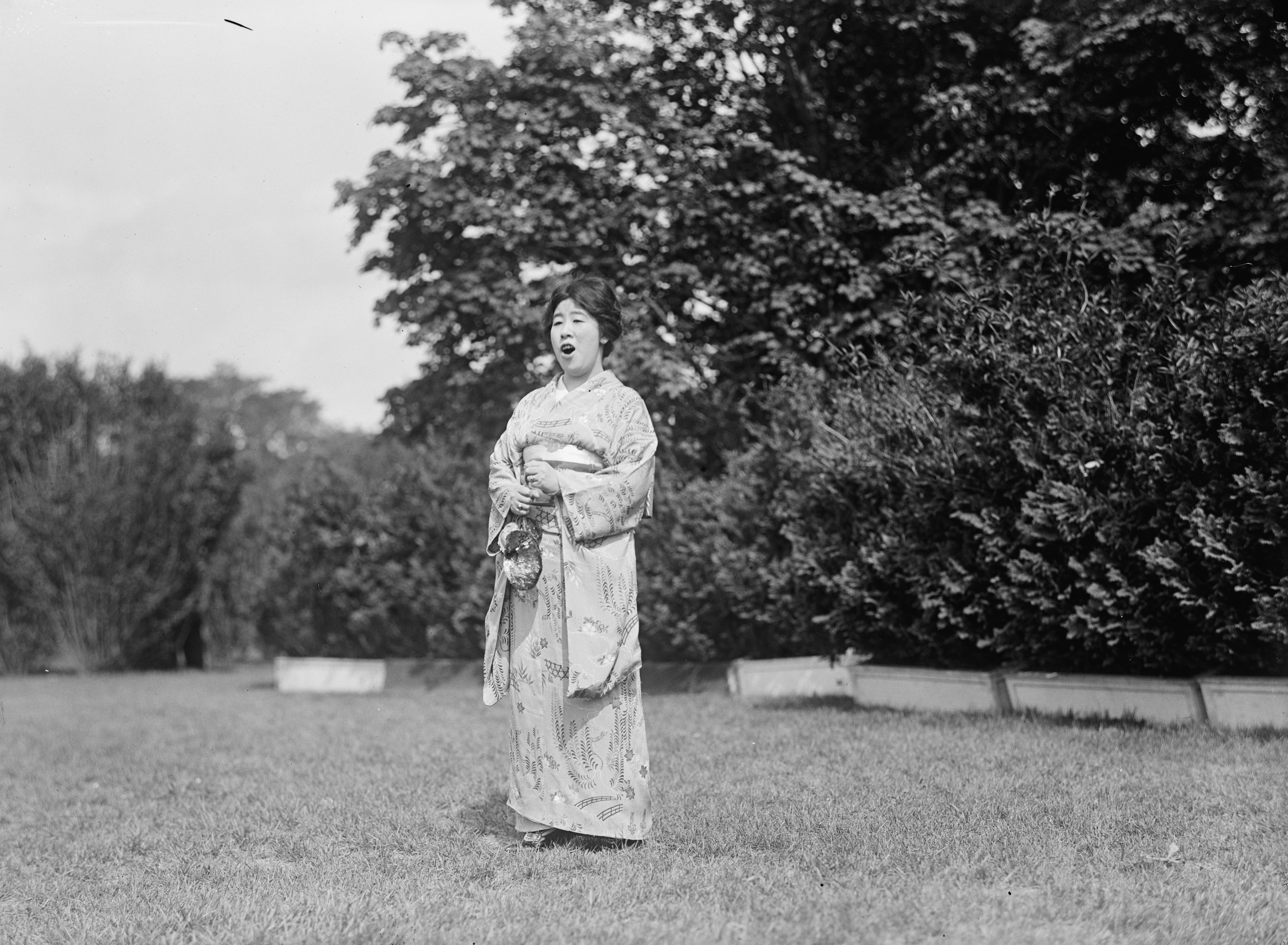
Miura in 1917

Tamaki Miura (三浦 環, Miura Tamaki; née Shibata (柴田) February 22, 1884 – May 26, 1946), was a Japanese opera singer who performed as Cio-Cio-San in Puccini's Madama Butterfly.

== Early life ==
Miura was born the first daughter of Shibata Mōho and Shibata Towa (née Nagata) on February 22, 1884, in Tokyo, Japan. Shibata, a music lover, had his daughter learn Japanese traditional dance and music. In her high school days, Miura set her mind to live a professional musician life under influence of her musical teacher Sugiura Chika, an alumna of Tokyo Music School. Just before Miura entered Tokyo Music School in 1900, she married an army medical officer Fujii Zen'ichi, whom her father Mōho had urged her to wed. They later divorced in 1907, after she graduated and started her professional career.

At Tokyo Music School, Miura learned piano, singing, and violin. When Japan held its first opera performance in 1903 at the auditorium of Tokyo Music School, Miura had a role while a student and gained a reputation. In 1904 she graduated Tokyo Music School and soon was employed with its faculty, first as an assistant and later as an associate professor. She built her musical career both as an educator and a performer.

== Musical career ==
Tamaki made her professional operatic debut in Tokyo in 1911. In 1913 she married with a prospective young medical doctor Miura, and the next year went to Europe to perform and study along her husband. First they went to Berlin and then moved to London after Japan and Germany declared war on each other (World War I). In London she got a chance: she was first cast as Cio-Cio-San by the director Vladimir Rosing as part of his Allied Opera Season held in May and June 1915 at the London Opera House.

In the autumn of 1915, she performed the role in America for the first time in Chicago with the Boston Opera Company. She also sang in St. Louis, Missouri, in October that year. Positive reviews led to further performances in both Madama Butterfly and Mascagni's Iris in New York City, San Francisco and Chicago, before returning to London to work with the Beecham company. In 1918 she returned to the United States where for two seasons she performed both Madama Butterfly and André Messager's Madame Chrysanthème. The latter was not well-received, being viewed as a warmed-over Butterfly. In 1920 she was a guest performer at opera houses in Monte Carlo, Barcelona, Florence and Rome. Upon her return to Japan from this tour, she stopped in Nagasaki in 1922 to see places connected with the opera and to give a concert.

In 1924, Miura returned to the United States to perform with the San Carlo Opera Company. Two years later she again went to Chicago to create the title role in Aldo Franchetti's Namiko-San. After this she took part in various tours and sang in Italy (March 1931 she performed at the Teatro Verdi of Pisa with the famous tenor Armando Bini, at Carani in Sassuolo, Modena in Livorno, Florence, Lucca, Pistoia, Torino, Novi Ligure, Rimini) before returning to Japan in 1932.

In 1940, Miura assisted Arai Wagorō with the production and distribution of Madame Butterfly's Illusion.

She died on May 26, 1946, in Japan.

== Legacy ==
Her statue, with that of Puccini, can be seen in Nagasaki's Glover Garden.

Mt. Fuji International Opera Competition of Shizuoka held by Shizuoka Prefecture has commemorated her and awarded MIURA Tamaki Special Prize .
