= Madame Butterfly (1932 film) =

1932 film directed by Marion Gering

- Movie poster
- Directed by: Marion Gering
- Written by: David Belasco (play); John Luther Long (short-story); Josephine Lovett (screenplay); Joseph Moncure March (screenplay)
- Produced by: B. P. Schulberg
- Starring: Sylvia Sidney; Cary Grant; Charlie Ruggles; Irving Pichel
- Cinematography: David Abel
- Edited by: Jane Loring
- Music by: W. Franke Harling
- Distributed by: Paramount Pictures
- Release date: December 30, 1932
- Running time: 86 minutes
- Country: United States
- Language: English

Madame Butterfly is a 1932 American pre-Code drama film directed by Marion Gering, based on David Belasco's play and the story by John Luther Long. It was adapted by Josephine Lovett and Joseph Moncure March. It stars Cary Grant and Sylvia Sidney. Music is credited to W. Franke Harling (although much of it is an adaptation of Giacomo Puccini's opera Madama Butterfly), cinematography by David Abel, art direction by Ward Ihnen. It premiered on December 30, 1932.

== Plot ==
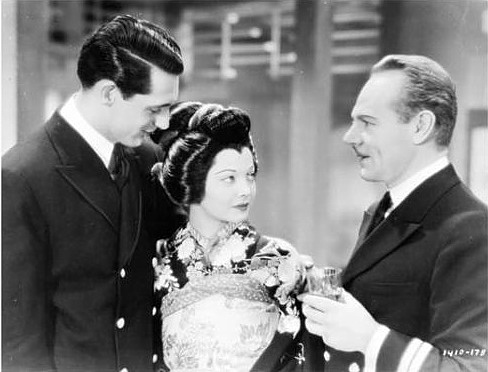
Cary Grant, Sylvia Sidney and Charlie Ruggles in Madame Butterfly

At Goro's Tea House, we are introduced to Cho-Cho San who is bidding farewell to her mother and grandfather. She is about to undergo training as a geisha in exchange for money that will support her family. After the relatives leave, Goro introduces Prince Yamadori, a prospective husband, to Cho-Cho San. When Yamadori finds her withdrawn, Madame Goro explains that Cho-Cho San is high-born and is not yet used to the geisha life style.

Meanwhile, on board an American steamship due to arrive in Japan for several months' stay, Lieutenant Barton convinces his friend Lieutenant Ben F. Pinkerton that once they arrive to skip the American Counsul's party and plan to enjoy themselves instead. Pinkerton looks at a photograph of a blonde woman and hides it in his clothing trunk.

Back at Goro's, Mrs. Goro prepares Cho-Cho San for another meeting with Yamadori by dressing her more elegantly. Meanwhile, Pinkerton and Barton enter Goro's, and are greeted by geishas. They are seated and watch a performance of dancing and music played by the geishas, and begin to become intimate with them. Goro interrupts so Pinkerton wanders to a different room and, through a screen, sees a dancing silhouette. Entering further, he discovers Cho-Cho San practicing her dancing. Despite Goro's admonishment, he is immediately enchanted with Cho-Cho San, who runs away to the garden in fear. Pinkerton catches up to her and they talk.

Yamadori comes to meet Cho-Cho San again. Goro pretends she is indisposed but a neighboring geisha reveals that she is with a naval officer. Infuriated, Yamadori vows never to set foot in Goro's house again. This makes Goro angry at Cho-Cho San, since Yamadori was Goro's best client. Goro threatens to shame Cho-Cho San's family because she has been disobedient. Pinkerton asks Goro to explain why he is so angry, and Goro tells him that Cho-Cho San was supposed to marry Yamadori. Barton takes Pinkerton aside and tells him that "marriage" to Japanese is just a formality: when husbands desert, the geishas can automatically be considered divorced. Realizing how easy the situation is, Pinkerton informs Goro of his intention to marry Cho-Cho San.

Cho-Cho San's relatives assemble at the couple's new house, and the marriage takes place as a tea ceremony. Afterwards, Cho-Cho San prays at her home altar, adorned with a picture of her ancestors. Pinkerton asks Barton to send the relatives away, while he gets to know Cho-Cho San better and shows her how to kiss.

Several days later, Pinkerton arrives home, where Cho-Cho San greets him with honors. He gives her a translucent veil. She offers him drink and a pipe to smoke. While searching for some pipe cleaners in Pinkerton's trunk, Cho-Cho San discovers the picture of a blonde woman, which is inscribed to Pinkerton from “Adelaide”. With a serious face, she brings it to Pinkerton and asks if he is in love with the woman. He denies it.

Several weeks later, the home altar now shows a picture of Pinkerton. Cho-Cho San happily receives Pinkerton and Barton. In an aside to Barton, Pinkerton explains that he hasn't had the courage to tell Cho-Cho San that he's leaving the following day. Barton suggests they all have dinner at the hotel. While eating, the commander of the naval vessel visits the table, mentioning they are due to leave tomorrow. Cho-Cho San is taken aback. Returning home, Cho-Cho San is upset, so Pinkerton sings to her "My Flower Of Japan".

The following day, Pinkerton asks Cho-Cho San not to see him off at the dock. She asks about the girl in the picture but Pinkerton says he loves only Cho-Cho San and promises to come back in the spring. "When the robins nest again?" asks Cho-Cho San and Pinkerton affirms.

The scene cuts to the next spring, and Cho-Cho San happily holds her infant son. She points out that a robin has nested and speaks to her son, revealing his name as "Trouble" for now, but when Pinkerton returns, it will be changed to "Joy".

The scene cuts to a robin building a nest. Pinkerton and Adelaide, the woman from the photograph, are sitting in a garden in America. A ring on her finger indicates that they are engaged. She remarks that it is now spring to Pinkerton, who looks troubled. He offers to tell her something that might upset her and she agrees. The scene ends.

In Cho-Cho San's home, her grandfather asks her to marry Yamadori, but Cho-Cho San explains that, unlike in Japan where desertion is ground for divorce, in the United States divorce can only be effected by a judge after a period of years. He asks her to return home, if only for the sake of the child, but she rejects her grandfather's ways, saying that she and the entire house belong to Pinkerton. Her grandfather disowns her and asks that she never enter his house again.

Meanwhile, Pinkerton and Adelaide get married.

Back in Japan, Cho-Cho San remarks that the robins have nested three times. She goes to see the American consul and asks about the nesting habits of American robins. Understanding what has happened, he explains that, in the United States, they nest only once in three years. Relieved, Cho-Cho San leaves happily and goes to a temple to pray. Meanwhile, the consul sends a radiogram to Pinkerton asking him to see him as soon as his ship docks.

When Cho-Cho San sees US naval ships in the distance, she is overjoyed and explains to her son that his father has returned.

At the dock, Pinkerton is met by Adelaide. Barton mentions that the Consul will be having a party that night, and Pinkerton assumes that's why he sent the radiogram.

Cho-Cho San suggests to Suzuki that they surprise Pinkerton: Suzuki will be with Trouble in the next room and only bring him out when Cho-Cho San's claps. They sit by the window to watch for Pinkerton's approach. Suzuki and Trouble fall asleep, but Cho-Cho San continues to watch all through night. In the morning, Suzuki encourages Cho-Cho San to go to bed. Dejected, she still believes Pinkerton will come, despite Suzuki's warnings that "men always forget."

Meanwhile, having talked to the Consul at the party, Pinkerton explains the situation to Adelaide: he needs to visit Cho-Cho San to settle the matter and asks her to accompany him.

Pinkerton and Adelaide arrive at Cho-Cho San's house. While Adelaide waits outside the gate, he goes up to the house and is greeted by a wildly happy Cho-Cho San. Her happiness turns serious as he explains that he must leave soon and is never coming back. Cho-Cho San sees Adelaide waiting, and realizes that Pinkerton has married another woman – the woman she had seen in the picture. In tears, she bids him goodbye.

Crying, she tells Trouble that his father has taken another woman, while Trouble fidgets with an ancestral heirloom, a knife. She then tells Suzuki to take Trouble to his grandfather, who will raise Trouble "in the ways of his ancestors." She tells Suzuki she will follow after she prays. As she prays, she recalls the American marriage vow "till death do us part". She unsheathes the knife and sees the inscription "To die with honor when one can no longer live with honor." Wrapping the veil Pinkerton gave her around her neck, she stabs herself. Her dying words are "I love you for always."

== Cast ==
- Sylvia Sidney as Cho-Cho San
- Cary Grant as Lieutenant B. F. Pinkerton
- Charlie Ruggles as Lieutenant Barton
- Irving Pichel as Yamadori
- Edmund Breese as Cho-Cho San's grandfather
- Helen Jerome Eddy as Cho-Cho San's mother
- Judith Vosselli as Madame Goro
- Sheila Terry as Adelaide Pinkerton
- Berton Churchill as American Consul
- Louise Carter as Sazuki

== Music ==
Although almost no singing occurs during the film, much of the underscoring is from or based on Puccini's opera Madama Butterfly, and much of it in the corresponding places of where it would occur in the opera:

- The opening title is a modified version of the introduction.
- When Pinkerton gets the idea to marry Cho-Cho San (and after the wedding ceremony) the music of the love duet is heard.
- After the two are married, the music from Tutti i fior is heard.
- In the first scene between Pinkerton and his wife Adelaide, the underscoring is of the popular song Poor Butterfly which is a parody based on the operatic character.
- When Cho-Cho San, Suzuki, and Trouble sit down at the window, the Humming Chorus is heard.
- Before Pinkerton's return to Cho-Cho San, a small bit of E Izaghi e Izanami (the Act 2 opening) is heard.
- When Cho-Cho San sees and finally meets Pinkerton after his long absence, Un bel di is heard.
- When Cho-Cho San unsheathes the knife, the music of Con onor muore is heard.
- The end of the film has the same music as the final minutes of the opera.
- During the final credits, Un bel di is heard.
