= David Belasco =

American theatrical figure (1853–1931)

David J. Belasco
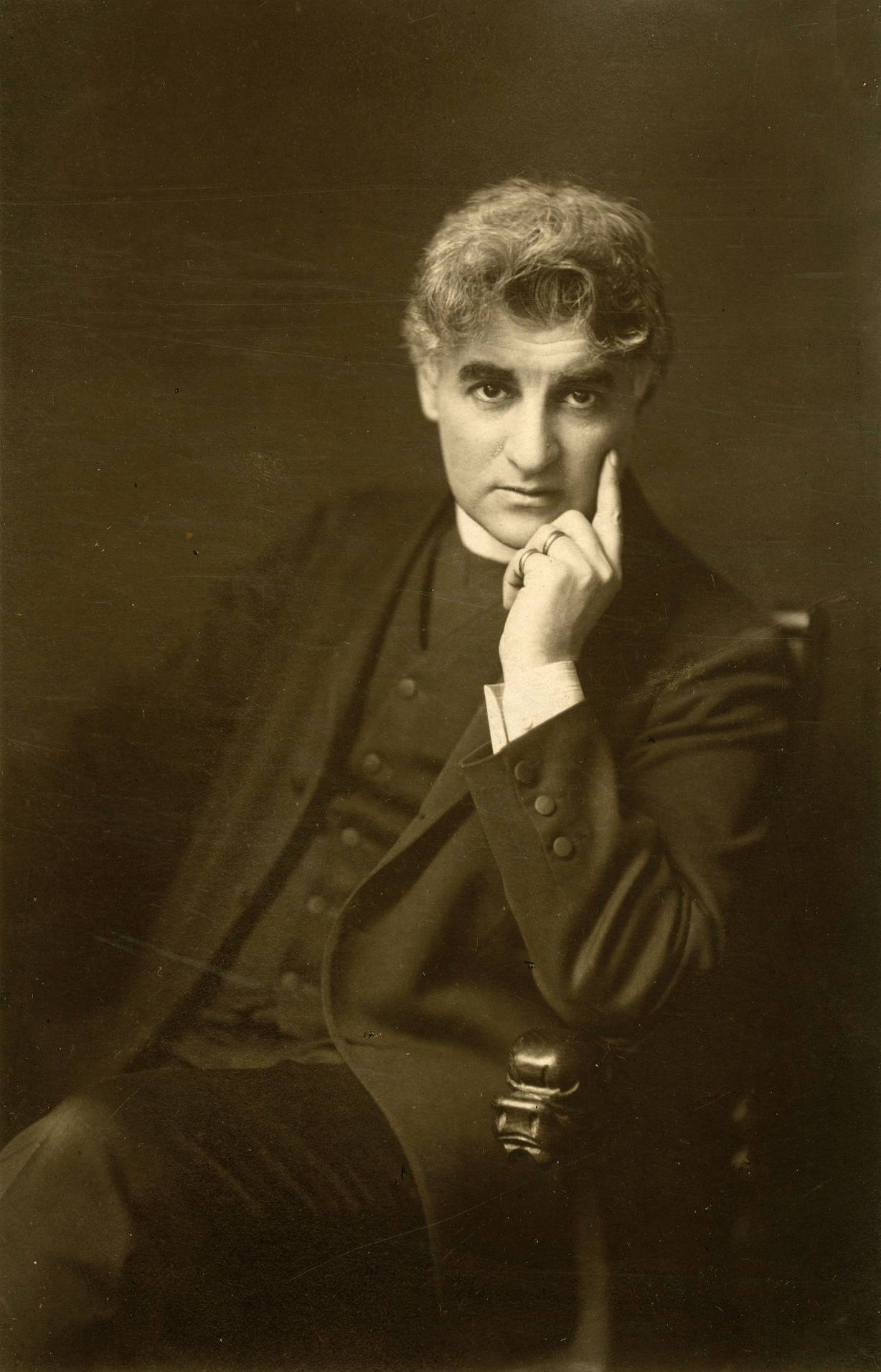
- Belasco in 1909
- Born: July 25, 1853; San Francisco, California, U.S.
- Died: May 14, 1931 (aged 77); New York City, U.S.
- Occupations: Theatrical producer, director, playwright
- Years active: 1873 to 1930
- Known for: Belasco Theatre; pioneer of modern stage lighting and stage effects; stage naturalism
- Notable credit: Madame Butterfly
- Spouse: Cecilia Loverich (m. 1873; died 1926)

David Belasco (July 25, 1853 – May 14, 1931) was an American theatrical producer, impresario, director, and playwright. He was the first writer to adapt the short story Madame Butterfly for the stage. He launched the theatrical career of many actors, including James O'Neill, Mary Pickford, Lenore Ulric, and Barbara Stanwyck. Belasco pioneered many innovative new forms of stage lighting and special effects in order to create realism and naturalism.

== Early years ==
David Belasco was born in 1853 in San Francisco, California, the son of Abraham H. Belasco (1830–1911) and Reyna Belasco (née Nunes, 1830–1899), Sephardic Jews who had immigrated to the United States from London's Spanish and Portuguese Jewish community during the California gold rush. He began working as a youth in a San Francisco theater doing a variety of routine jobs, such as call boy, script copier, or as an extra in small parts. He received his first experience as a stage manager while on the road. He said, "We used to play in any place we could hire or get into—a hall, a big dining room, an empty barn; any place that would take us."

From late 1873 to early 1874, he worked as an actor, director, and secretary at Piper's Opera House in Virginia City, Nevada, where he found "more reckless women and desperadoes to the square foot…than anywhere else in the world". His developmental years as a supporting player in Virginia City colored his thoughts and eventually helped him to conceive realistic stage settings. He said that while working there, seeing "people die under such peculiar circumstances" made him

all the more particular in regard to the psychology of dying on the stage. I think I was one of the first to bring naturalness to bear in death scenes, and my varied Virginia City experiences did much to help me toward this. Later I was to go deeper into such studies.

His recollections of that time were published in Hearst's Magazine in 1914.

By March 1874, he was back at work in San Francisco, eventually managing Thomas Maguire's Baldwin Theater. When Maguire lost the theater in 1882, Belasco relocated to the East Coast, bringing his practical western experiences with him. The West allowed him to develop his talents as not only a performer, but in progressive production design and execution.

A gifted playwright, Belasco went to New York City in 1882. He worked as stage manager for the Madison Square Theatre (starting with Young Mrs. Winthrop), and then the old Lyceum Theatre, while also writing original plays. By 1895, he was so successful that he was considered America's most distinguished playwright and producer.

== Career ==
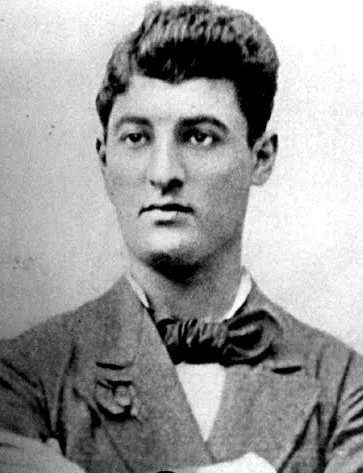
Belasco in 1873

During his long creative career, stretching between 1884 and 1930, Belasco either wrote, directed, or produced more than 100 Broadway plays, including Hearts of Oak, The Heart of Maryland, and Du Barry, making him the most powerful personality on the New York City theater scene. He also helped establish careers for dozens of notable stage performers, many of whom went on to work in films.

Among them were Leslie Carter, dubbed "The American Sarah Bernhardt," whose association with Belasco skyrocketed her to theatrical fame after her roles in Zaza (1898) and Madame Du Barry (1901). Ina Claire's lead in Polly with a Past (1917) and The Gold Diggers (1919) similarly propelled her career. Belasco wrote a lead part for 18-year-old Maude Adams in his new play Men and Women (1890), which ran for 200 performances.

Other stars whose careers he helped launch included Jeanne Eagels, who would later achieve immortality as Sadie Thompson in Rain (1923), which played for 340 performances. Belasco discovered and managed the careers of Lenore Ulric and David Warfield, both of whom became major stars on Broadway. He launched the career of Barbara Stanwyck, and was responsible for changing her name.

Belasco is perhaps most famous for two works that were adapted as highly popular operas. He adapted the short story Madame Butterfly as a play with the same name. He also wrote the play The Girl of the Golden West. Both of these works were adapted as operas by Italian composer Giacomo Puccini (Madama Butterfly 1904—twice, after revision) and La fanciulla del West (1910).

In other adaptations, more than forty motion pictures have been made from the many plays that Belasco wrote.

To me, David Belasco was like the King of England, Julius Caesar and Napoleon rolled into one.

— Mary Pickford

Many prominent performers of the late 19th and early 20th centuries sought the opportunity to work with Belasco; among them were D. W. Griffith, Helen Hayes, Lillian Gish, Mary Pickford and Cecil B. DeMille. DeMille's father had been close friends with Belasco. After DeMille graduated from the American Academy of Dramatic Arts, he began his stage career under Belasco's guidance. DeMille's later methods of handling actors, using dramatic lighting and directing films, were modeled after Belasco's staging techniques.

Pickford appeared in his plays The Warrens of Virginia at the first Belasco Theatre in 1907 and A Good Little Devil in 1913. The two remained in touch after Pickford began working in Hollywood; Belasco appeared with her in the 1914 film adaptation of A Good Little Devil. He is credited as giving Pickford her stage name as well. He also worked with Lionel Barrymore, who starred in his play Laugh, Clown, Laugh opposite Lucille Kahn, whose Broadway career Belasco launched. Belasco was a member of The Lambs from 1893 to 1931.

== Marriage ==
David Belasco was married to Cecilia Loverich for over fifty years. They had two daughters, Reina (who later married producer Morris Gest) and Augusta.

== Death ==
Belasco died on May 14, 1931, at the age of 77 in Manhattan. His funeral was held at Central Synagogue, Manhattan. He was interred in the Linden Hill Jewish Cemetery on Metropolitan Avenue in Ridgewood, Queens.

== Influence on American theatre ==
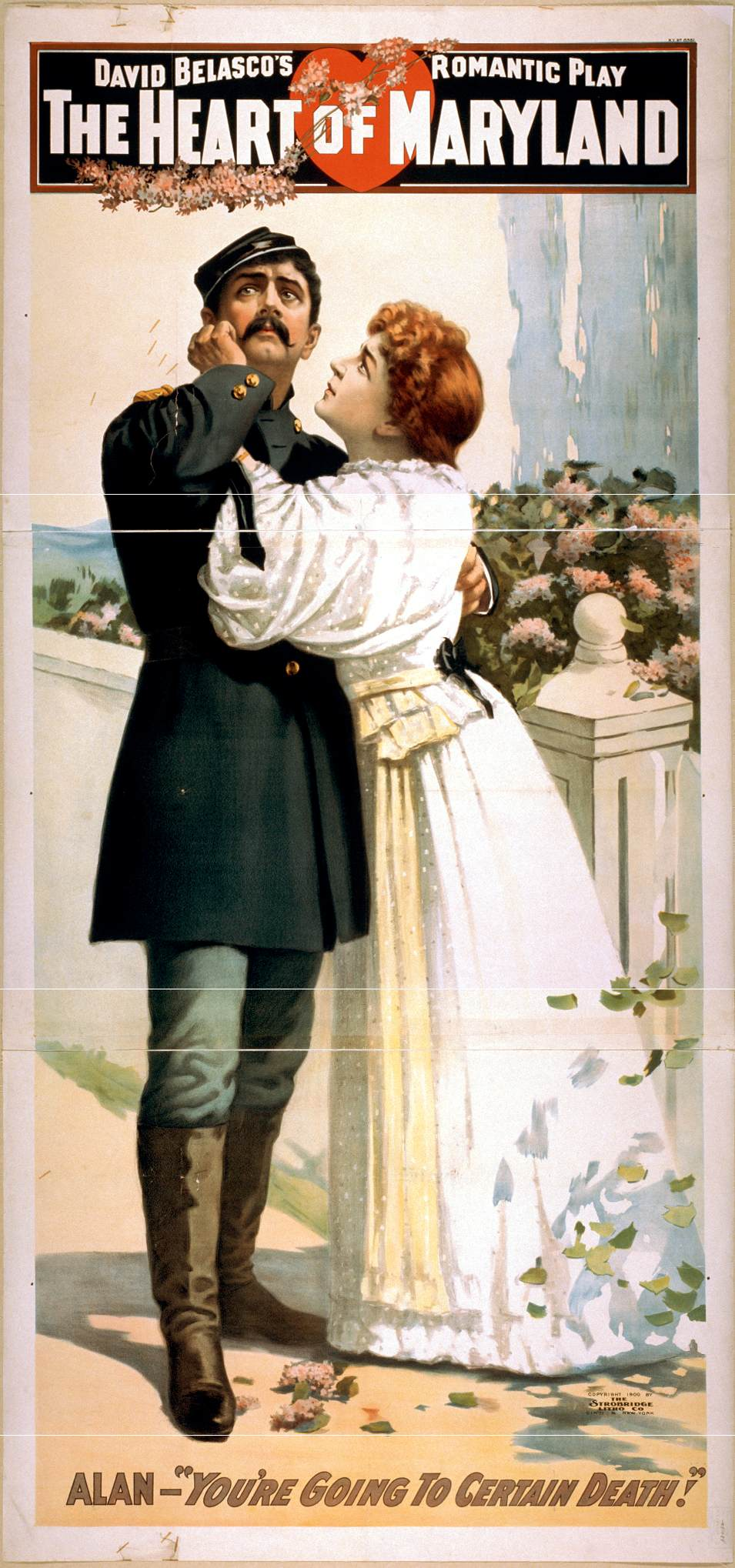
Poster for The Heart of Maryland with Maurice Barrymore and Mrs. Leslie Carter

Belasco demanded a natural acting style, and to complement that, he developed stage settings with authentic lighting effects to enhance his plays. His productions inspired several generations of theatre lighting designers.

Belasco's contributions to modern stage and lighting techniques were originally not appreciated as much as those of his European counterparts, such as André Antoine and Constantin Stanislavski. But today he is regarded as "one of the first significant directorial figures in the history of the American theatre," writes theatre historian Lise-Lone Marker.

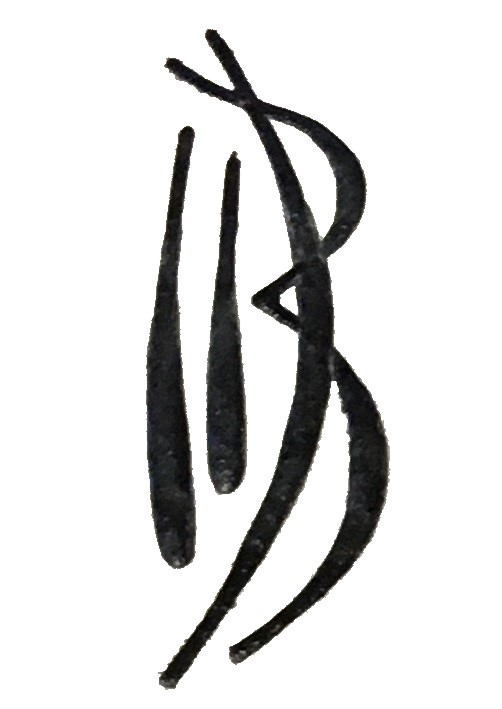
Belasco's monogram

He brought a new standard of naturalism to the American stage as the first to develop modern stage lighting, along with the use of colored lights, via motorized color changing wheels, to evoke mood and setting. America's earliest stage lighting manufacturer, Kliegl Brothers, began by serving the specialized needs of producers and directors such as Belasco and Florenz Ziegfeld. With regard to these modern lighting effects, Belasco is best remembered for his production of Girl of the Golden West (1905), with the play opening to a spectacular sunset that lasted five minutes before any dialogue started.

Belasco became one of the first directors to eschew the use of traditional footlights in favor of lights concealed below floor level, thereby hidden from the audience. His lighting assistant, Louis Hartmann, realized Belasco's design ideas. He also used 'follow spots' to further create realism and often tailored his lighting configurations to complement the complexions and hair color of the actors. He ordered a specially made 1000-watt lamp developed just for his own productions. He was the only director to have one for the first two years after its introduction (1914–1915).

In his own theatres, the dressing rooms were equipped with lamps of several colors, allowing the performers to see how their makeup looked under different lighting conditions.

Belasco was said to put appropriate scents to set scenes in the ventilation systems of the theaters, while his sets were highly detailed and sometimes spilled out into the audience area. In one play, for instance, an operational laundromat was built onstage. The Governor's Lady had a reproduction of a Childs Restaurant kitchen, where actors cooked and prepared food during the play.

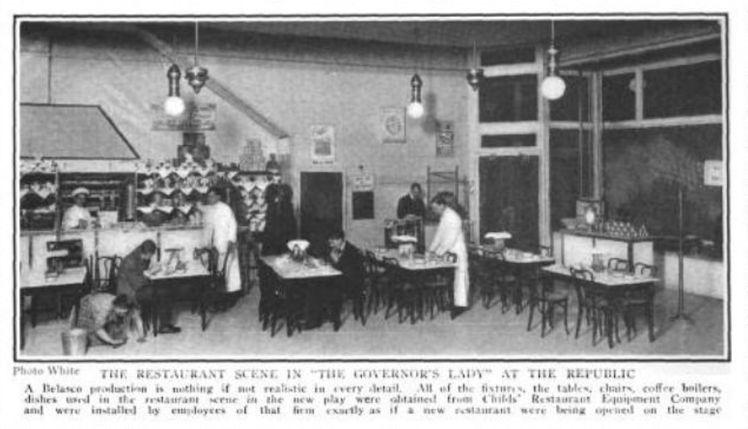
Childs Restaurant Scene in The Governor's Lady

In his 1919 book The Theatre through Its Stage Door, Belasco relates the following incident:

When I produced The Easiest Way I found myself in a dilemma. I planned one of its scenes to be an exact counterpart of a little hall bedroom in a cheap theatrical boarding-house in New York. We tried to build the scene in my shops, but, somehow, we could not make it look shabby enough. So I went to the meanest theatrical lodging-house I could find in the Tenderloin district and bought the entire interior of one of its most dilapidated rooms—patched furniture, threadbare carpet, tarnished and broken gas fixtures, tumble-down cupboards, dingy doors and window-casings, and even the faded paper on the walls.

Belasco's original scripts were often filled with long, specific descriptions of props and set dressings. He has not been noted for producing unusually naturalistic scenarios.

Belasco both embraced existing theatre technology and sought to expand on it. Both of Belasco's New York theatres were built on the cutting edge of their era's technology. When Belasco took over the Republic Theatre, he drilled a new basement level to accommodate his machinery. He had the Stuyvesant Theatre specially constructed with great amounts of flyspace, hydraulics systems and lighting rigs. The basement of the Stuyvesant contained a working machine shop, where Belasco and his team experimented with lighting and other special effects. Many of the innovations developed in the Belasco shop were sold to other producers.

F. Scott Fitzgerald refers to Belasco's reputation for realism in his novel The Great Gatsby (1925). A drunken visitor in the library of Gatsby's mansion exclaims in amazement that the books are genuine: "See!" he cried triumphantly. "It's a bona-fide piece of printed matter. It fooled me. This fella's a regular Belasco. It's a triumph. What thoroughness! What realism! Knew when to stop, too—didn't cut the pages."

== Theatres ==
=== New York ===
New York's first Belasco Theatre was originally the Republic Theatre, located at 229 West 42nd Street, between 7th and 8th Avenues, in Manhattan's Theater District. Belasco took over the theater and remodeled it in 1902, two years after it was constructed by Oscar Hammerstein. Belasco gave up the theater in 1910, after which it was renamed the Republic. The theater then went through a tumultuous period as a burlesque venue, then a second-run and later pornographic movie theater. It was rehabilitated and reopened as New Victory Theater in 1995.

New York's second Belasco Theatre is located at 111 West 44th Street, between 6th and 7th Avenues, a few blocks from the original New York Belasco. This theater, originally Stuyvesant Theatre, was constructed in 1907 and renamed Belasco in 1910. The theater was built to Belasco's wishes, with Tiffany lighting and ceiling panels, rich woodwork, and murals. Belasco's office and private apartment were also housed in the building. The Belasco is still in operation as a Broadway venue with much of the original decor intact.

=== Other cities ===
Belasco Theatres also existed in several other cities.

In Los Angeles, the first Belasco Theatre was located at 337 S. Main Street. This theater, which hosted the Belasco Stock Company, opened in 1904 and was operated by David Belasco's brother, Frederick. The theater was renamed twice: as the Republic c. 1913 and as the Follies c. 1919. The theater was used for burlesque in the 1940s, after which it fell into sharp decline. It was demolished in May 1974.

The second Belasco Theater in Los Angeles is located at 1050 South Hill Street). This theatre, built by Morgan, Walls & Clements and opened in 1926, was managed by another of David's brothers: Edward. Many Hollywood stars with theatrical roots as well as Broadway stars visiting the West Coast appeared in this theatre. However, the theater declined after Edward's death in 1937 and closed in the early 1950s. The building was then used as a church for several decades, and underwent an extensive restoration from 2010 to 2011. It is currently in use as a nightclub and convention venue.

Shubert-Belasco Theatre, located at 717 Madison Place, across from the White House in Washington, D.C., was purchased by Belasco in September 1905. Originally built in 1895 as the Lafayette Square Opera House, the theater was razed in 1962 and replaced by the U.S. Court of Claims building.

== Selected plays ==
- Hearts of Oak (1879), by James A. Herne and David Belasco
- La Belle Russe (1882), by David Belasco
- May Blossom (1884), by David Belasco
- Lord Chumley (1888), by Henry Churchill de Mille and David Belasco
- Men and Women (1890), by Henry Churchill de Mille and David Belasco
- The Girl I Left Behind Me (1893), by Franklin Fyles and David Belasco
- Pawn Ticket No. 210 (1894), by Clay M. Greene and David Belasco
- The Heart of Maryland (1895), by David Belasco
- Zaza (1898), by David Belasco (based on the play Zaza by Pierre Berton and Charles Simon)
- Madame Butterfly (1900), by David Belasco (based on the short story Madame Butterfly by John Luther Long)
- Du Barry (1901), by David Belasco
- The Auctioneer (1901)
- Sweet Kitty Bellairs (1903), by David Belasco (based on the novel The Bath Comedy by Agnes Castle and Egerton Castle)
- The Music Master (1904), by Charles Klein
- Adrea (1905), by David Belasco and John Luther Long
- The Girl of the Golden West (1905), by David Belasco
- Rose of the Rancho (1906), by Richard Walton Tully and David Belasco
- The Warrens of Virginia (1907), by William C. deMille
- A Grand Army Man (1907), by David Belasco, Pauline Phelps and Marion Short
- The Fighting Hope (1908), by William J. Hurlbut
- The Easiest Way (1909), by Eugene Walter
- The Lily (1909), by David Belasco (based on the play Le Lys by Pierre Wolff and Gaston Leroux)
- Just a Wife (1910), by Eugene Walter
- The Woman (1911), by William C. deMille
- The Return of Peter Grimm (1911), by David Belasco
- The Governor's Lady (1912), by Alice Bradley
- The Case of Becky (1912), by Edward Locke
- A Good Little Devil (1913), by Austin Strong (based on the play Un bon petit diable by Rosemonde Gérard and Maurice Rostand)
- The Temperamental Journey, by Leo Ditrichstein (based on Pour Vivre Heureux by André Rivoire and Yves Mirande)
- Seven Chances (1916), by Roi Cooper Megrue
- Tiger Rose (1917), by Willard Mack
- The Gold Diggers (1919), by Avery Hopwood
- The Son-Daughter (1919), by George Scarborough and David Belasco
- Kiki (1921), by David Belasco with music by Zoel Parenteau (based on the play Kiki by André Picard)
- Shore Leave (1922), by Hubert Osborne
- Laugh, Clown, Laugh (1923), by Tom Cushing and David Belasco (based on the play Ridi, pagliaccio! by Fausto Maria Martini)
- Ladies of the Evening (1924), by Milton Herbert Gropper
- The Dove (1925), by Willard Mack (based on a story by Gerald Beaumont)
- Lulu Belle (1926), by Charles MacArthur and Edward Sheldon
- Tonight or Never (1930), by Fanny Hatton and Frederic Hatton (based on the play Ma este vagy soha by Lili Hatvany)

== Filmography ==
- Lord Chumley, directed by James Kirkwood (1914, based on the play Lord Chumley)
- La Belle Russe, directed by William J. Hanley (1914, based on the play La Belle Russe)
- Men and Women, directed by James Kirkwood (1914, based on the play Men and Women)
- Rose of the Rancho, directed by Cecil B. DeMille (1914, based on the play Rose of the Rancho)
- The Girl of the Golden West, directed by Cecil B. DeMille (1915, based on the play The Girl of the Golden West)
- The Girl I Left Behind Me, directed by Lloyd B. Carleton (1915, based on the play The Girl I Left Behind Me)
- DuBarry, directed by Edoardo Bencivenga (1915, based on the play Du Barry)
- The Heart of Maryland, directed by Herbert Brenon (1915, based on the play The Heart of Maryland)
- May Blossom, directed by Allan Dwan (1915, based on the play May Blossom)
- The Case of Becky, directed by Frank Reicher (1915, based on the play The Case of Becky)
- Madame Butterfly, directed by Sidney Olcott (1915, based on the play Madame Butterfly)
- Zaza, directed by Edwin S. Porter and Hugh Ford (1915, based on the play Zaza)
- Sweet Kitty Bellairs, directed by James Young (1916, based on the play Sweet Kitty Bellairs)
- La Belle Russe, directed by Charles Brabin (1919, based on the play La Belle Russe)
- Harakiri, directed by Fritz Lang (Germany, 1919, based on the play Madame Butterfly)
- The Heart of Maryland, directed by Tom Terriss (1921, based on the play The Heart of Maryland)
- The Case of Becky, directed by Chester M. Franklin (1921, based on the play The Case of Becky)
- Pawn Ticket 210, directed by Scott R. Dunlap (1922, based on the play Pawn Ticket No. 210)
- The Girl of the Golden West, directed by Edwin Carewe (1923, based on the play The Girl of the Golden West)
- Zaza, directed by Allan Dwan (1923, based on the play Zaza)
- Tiger Rose, directed by Sidney Franklin (1923, based on the play Tiger Rose)
- Forty Winks, directed by Paul Iribe and Frank Urson (1925, based on the play Lord Chumley)
- Seven Chances, directed by Buster Keaton (1925, based on the play Seven Chances)
- Men and Women, directed by William C. deMille (1925, based on the play Men and Women)
- Kiki, directed by Clarence Brown (1926, based on the play Kiki)
- The Lily, directed by Victor Schertzinger (1926, based on the play The Lily)
- The Return of Peter Grimm, directed by Victor Schertzinger (1926, based on the play The Return of Peter Grimm)
- The Music Master, directed by Allan Dwan (1927, based on the play The Music Master)
- The Heart of Maryland, directed by Lloyd Bacon (1927, based on the play The Heart of Maryland)
- Laugh, Clown, Laugh, directed by Herbert Brenon (1928, based on the play Laugh, Clown, Laugh)
- Ladies of Leisure, directed by Frank Capra (1930, based on the play Ladies of the Evening)
- Sweet Kitty Bellairs, directed by Alfred E. Green (1930, based on the play Sweet Kitty Bellairs)
- Du Barry, Woman of Passion, directed by Sam Taylor (1930, based on the play Du Barry)
- The Girl of the Golden West, directed by John Francis Dillon (1930, based on the play The Girl of the Golden West)
- Kiki, directed by Sam Taylor (1931, based on the play Kiki)
- Tonight or Never, directed by Mervyn LeRoy (1931, based on the play Tonight or Never)
- Girl of the Rio, directed by Herbert Brenon (1932, based on the play The Dove)
- The Hatchet Man, directed by William A. Wellman (1932, based on the play The Honorable Mr. Wong)
- The Son-Daughter, directed by Clarence Brown (1932, based on the play The Son-Daughter)
- Madame Butterfly, directed by Marion Gering (1932, based on the play Madame Butterfly)
- The Return of Peter Grimm, directed by George Nicholls Jr. (1935, based on the play The Return of Peter Grimm)
- Rose of the Rancho, directed by Marion Gering (1936, based on the play Rose of the Rancho)
- Follow the Fleet, directed by Mark Sandrich (1936, based on the play Shore Leave)
- The Girl of the Golden West, directed by Robert Z. Leonard (1938, based on the play The Girl of the Golden West)
- Zaza, directed by George Cukor (1939, based on the play Zaza)
- Lulu Belle, directed by Leslie Fenton (1948, based on the play Lulu Belle)
- Madame Butterfly, directed by Carmine Gallone (Italy, 1954, based on the opera Madama Butterfly)
- Madame Butterfly, directed by Frédéric Mitterrand (France, 1995, based on the opera Madama Butterfly)

=== Producer ===
- A Good Little Devil, directed by Edwin S. Porter (1914, Famous Players Film Company)
- Rose of the Rancho, directed by Cecil B. DeMille (1914, Jesse L. Lasky Feature Play Co.)
- The Girl of the Golden West, directed by Cecil B. DeMille (1915, Jesse L. Lasky Feature Play Co.)
- The Warrens of Virginia, directed by Cecil B. DeMille (1915, Jesse L. Lasky Feature Play Co.)
- The Governor's Lady, directed by George Melford (1915, Jesse L. Lasky Feature Play Co.)
- The Woman, directed by George Melford (1915, Jesse L. Lasky Feature Play Co.)
- The Fighting Hope, directed by George Melford (1915, Jesse L. Lasky Feature Play Co.)
- The Case of Becky, directed by Frank Reicher (1915, Jesse L. Lasky Feature Play Co.)
- Her Accidental Husband, directed by Dallas M. Fitzgerald (1923, Belasco Productions, Inc.)
- The Gold Diggers, directed by Harry Beaumont (1923, Warner Bros.)
- Tiger Rose, directed by Sidney Franklin (1923, Warner Bros.)
- Welcome Stranger, directed by James Young (1924, Belasco Productions, Inc.)
- Friendly Enemies, directed by George Melford (1925, Belasco Productions, Inc.)
- Fifth Avenue, directed by Robert G. Vignola (1926, Belasco Productions, Inc.)
- The Prince of Pilsen, directed by Paul Powell (1926, Belasco Productions, Inc.)

=== Films about David Belasco ===
- Lady with Red Hair, directed by Curtis Bernhardt (1940), with Claude Rains as David Belasco

== See also ==
- The Auctioneer (1927)
- William Ziegler House
