= The Girl of the Golden West (1923 film) =

1923 film

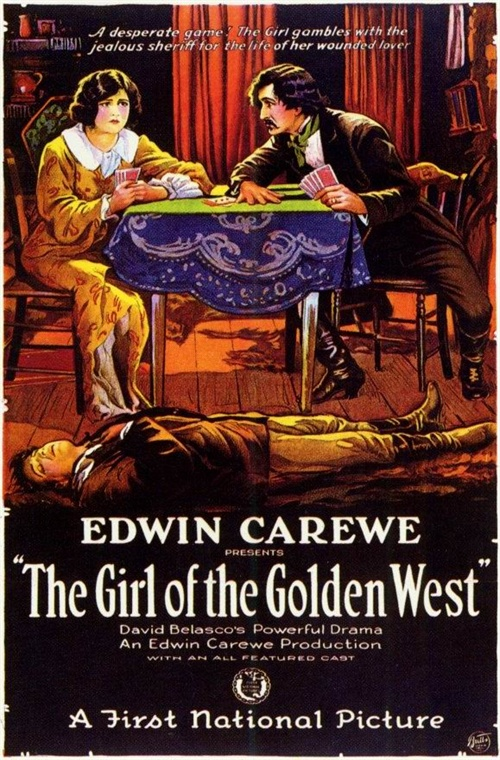
- Film poster
- Directed by: Edwin Carewe
- Written by: Adelaide Heilbron (adaptation)
- Based on: The Girl of the Golden West; 1905 play by David Belasco
- Produced by: Edwin Carewe
- Starring: Sylvia Breamer; J. Warren Kerrigan; Russell Simpson
- Cinematography: Sol Polito; Thomas Storey
- Edited by: Robert De Lacey
- Distributed by: Associated First National
- Release date: May 3, 1923
- Running time: 7 reels
- Country: United States
- Languages: Silent; English intertitles

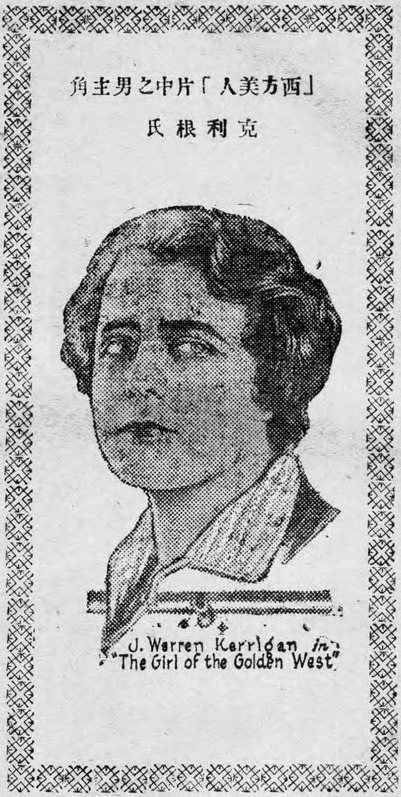
Bilingual ad in the Chinese language Screen Weekly, 1925

The Girl of the Golden West is a 1923 American silent Western film directed and produced by Edwin Carewe and starring Sylvia Breamer, J. Warren Kerrigan, and Russell Simpson. It was distributed through Associated First National Pictures. It is based on the 1905 David Belasco play The Girl of the Golden West.

== Cast ==
- Sylvia Breamer as The Girl
- J. Warren Kerrigan as Ramerrez
- Russell Simpson as Jack Rance
- Rosemary Theby as Nina Micheltorena
- Wilfred Lucas as Ashby
- Nelson McDowell as Sonora Slim
- Charles McHugh as Trinidad Joe
- Hector V. Sarno as Castro
- Jed Prouty as Nick
- Cecil Holland as Antonio
- Thomas Delmar as Handsome Harry
- Fred Warren as Old Jed Hawkins
- Sam Appel as Pedro Micheltorena
- Minnie Devereaux as The Squaw

== Preservation ==
With no prints of The Girl of the Golden West located in any film archives, it is a lost film.
