= The Girl of the Golden West (play) =

1905 play written by David Belasco

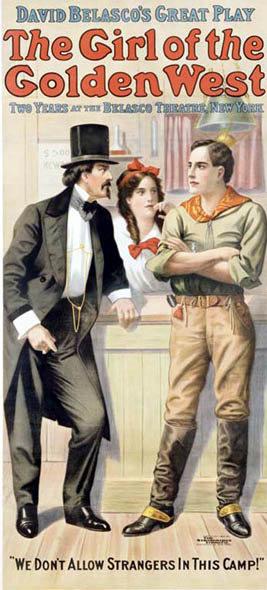
Poster for the 1907 run of The Girl of the Golden West

The Girl of the Golden West is a theatrical play written, produced and directed by David Belasco, set in the California Gold Rush. The four-act melodrama opened at the old Belasco Theatre in New York on November 14, 1905 and ran for 224 performances. Blanche Bates originated the role of The Girl, Robert C. Hilliard played Dick Johnson, and Frank Keenan played Jack Rance. Bates was joined by Charles Millward and Cuyler Hastings for two-week Broadway runs in 1907 and 1908. William Furst composed the play's incidental music. The play toured throughout the US for several years.

The play has been adapted numerous times, most notably as the 1910 opera La fanciulla del West by Giacomo Puccini. It was also made into four films, all titled The Girl of the Golden West, in 1915, 1923, 1930 and 1938. In 1911, Belasco wrote a novel based on the play.

== Characters ==
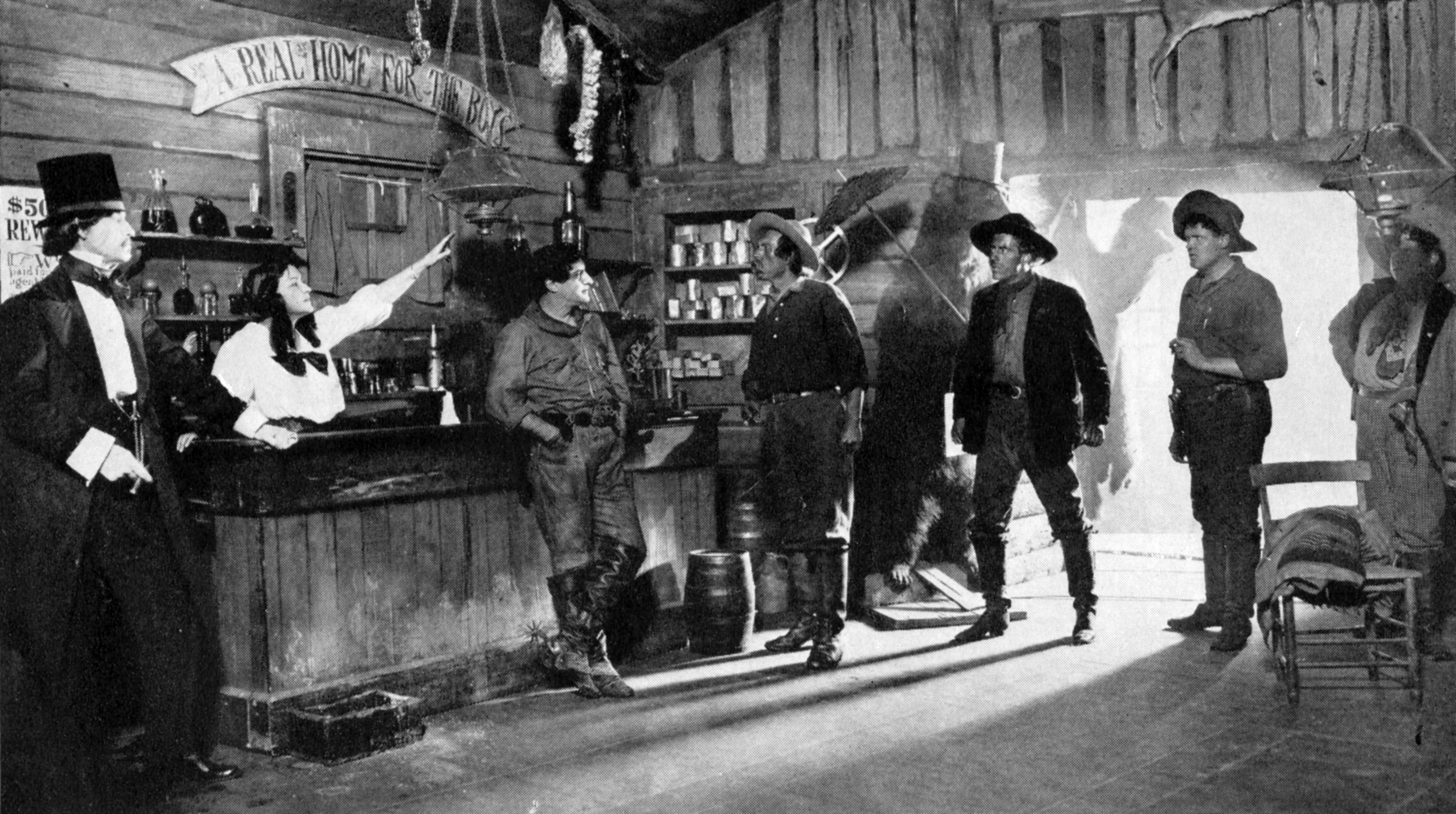
Blanche Bates in the original Broadway production of The Girl of the Golden West (1905)

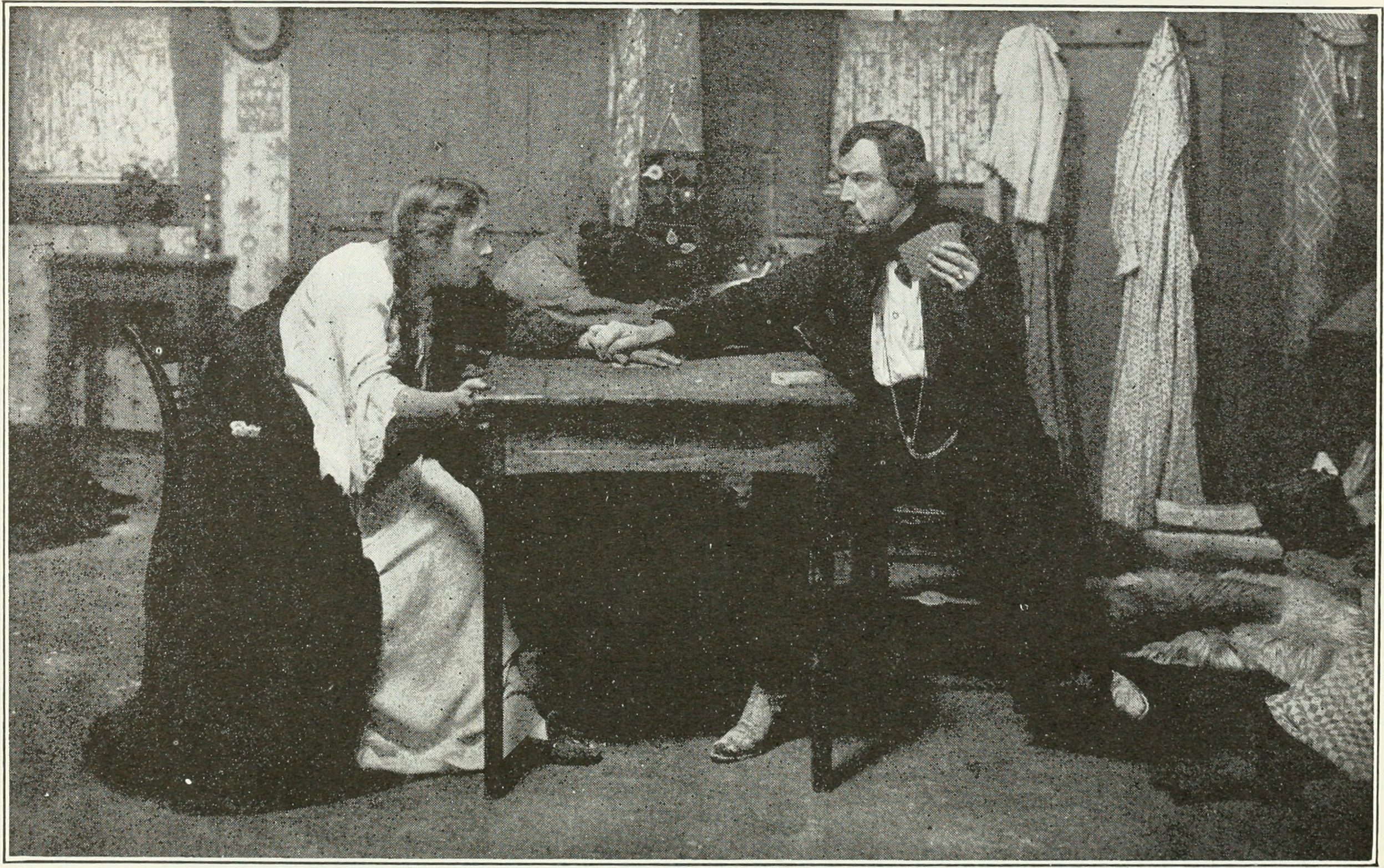
Blanche Bates and Frank Keenan in the original Broadway production of The Girl of the Golden West (1905)

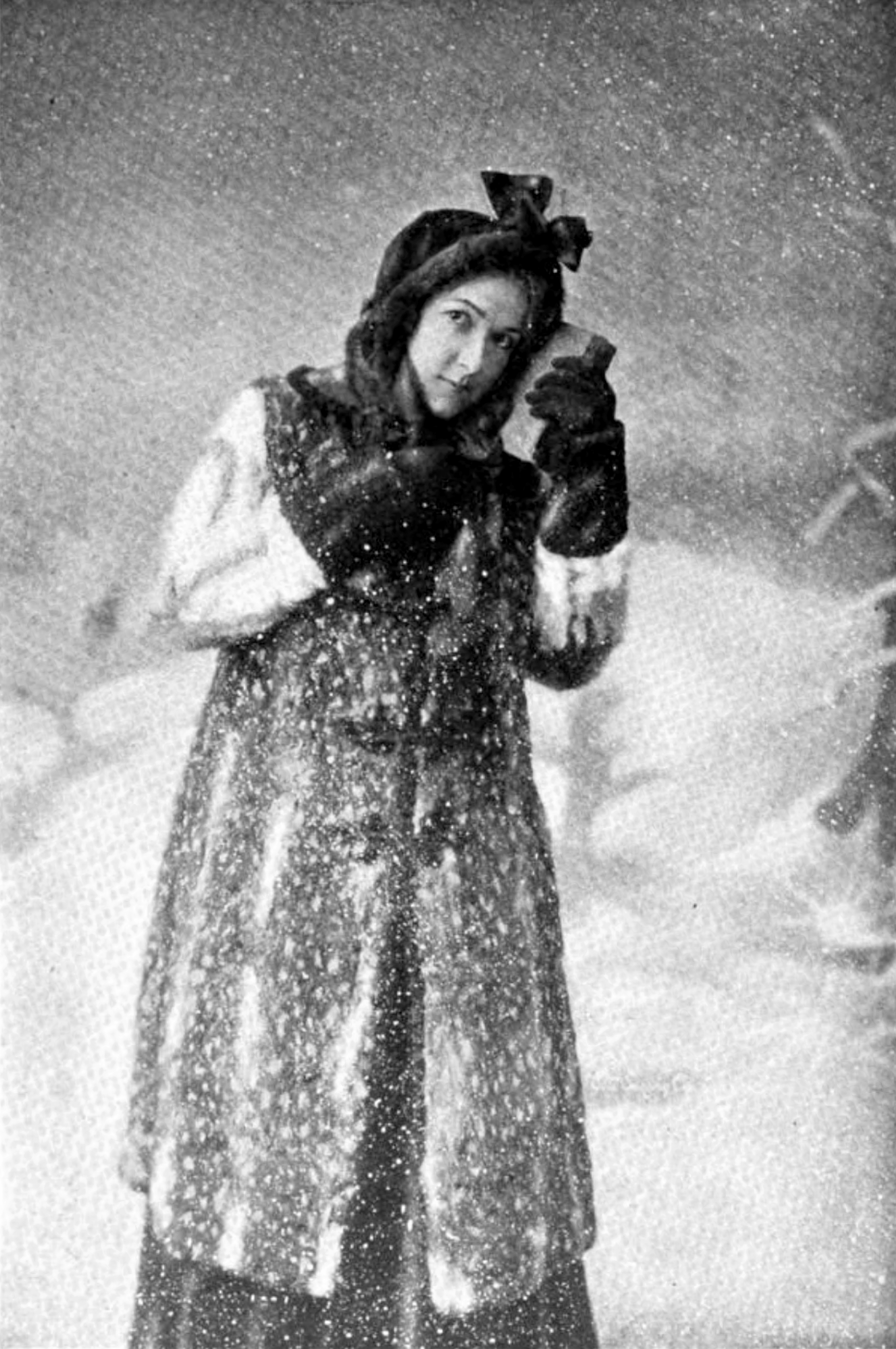
Blanche Bates in The Girl of the Golden West (1905)

- The Girl (Minnie)
- Jack Rance, gambler and Sheriff
- Dick Johnson, a stranger
- Sonora Slim
- Trinidad Joe
- Nick, bartender at The Polka
- The Sidney Duck, a faro-dealer
- Jim Larkens
- Handsome Charlie
- Happy Halliday
- Deputy Sheriff
- Ashby, a Wells-Fargo agent
- José Castro, member of Ramerrez's band
- Rider of the Pony Express
- Jack Wallace, a traveling camp minstrel
- Bucking Billy, from Watson's
- The Lookout
- A Faro-dealer
- The Boy from the Ridge
- Joe, Concertina Player
- Citizens of the Camp and Boys of the Ridge
- Wowkle, the fox, Billy Jackrabbit's squaw

== Bibliography ==
- Mantle, Burns and Garrison P. Sherwood, eds., The Best Plays of 1899-1909, Philadelphia: The Blakiston Company, 1944.
- The Girl of the Golden West theatrical program folder held by the Billy Rose Theatre Division, New York Public Library for the Performing Arts.
- "The Girl of the Golden West", Internet Broadway Database, ibdb.com.
- American Film Institute, Catalog of Motion Pictures Produced in the United States: Feature Films, 1911-1920, Berkeley, University of California Press, 1988.
- American Film Institute, Catalog of Motion Pictures Produced in the United States: Feature Films, 1921-1930, Berkeley, University of California Press, 1971.
- American Film Institute, Catalog of Motion Pictures Produced in the United States: Feature Films, 1931-1940, Berkeley, University of California Press, 1993.
