= Madame Butterfly's Illusion =

Ochōfujin no gensō
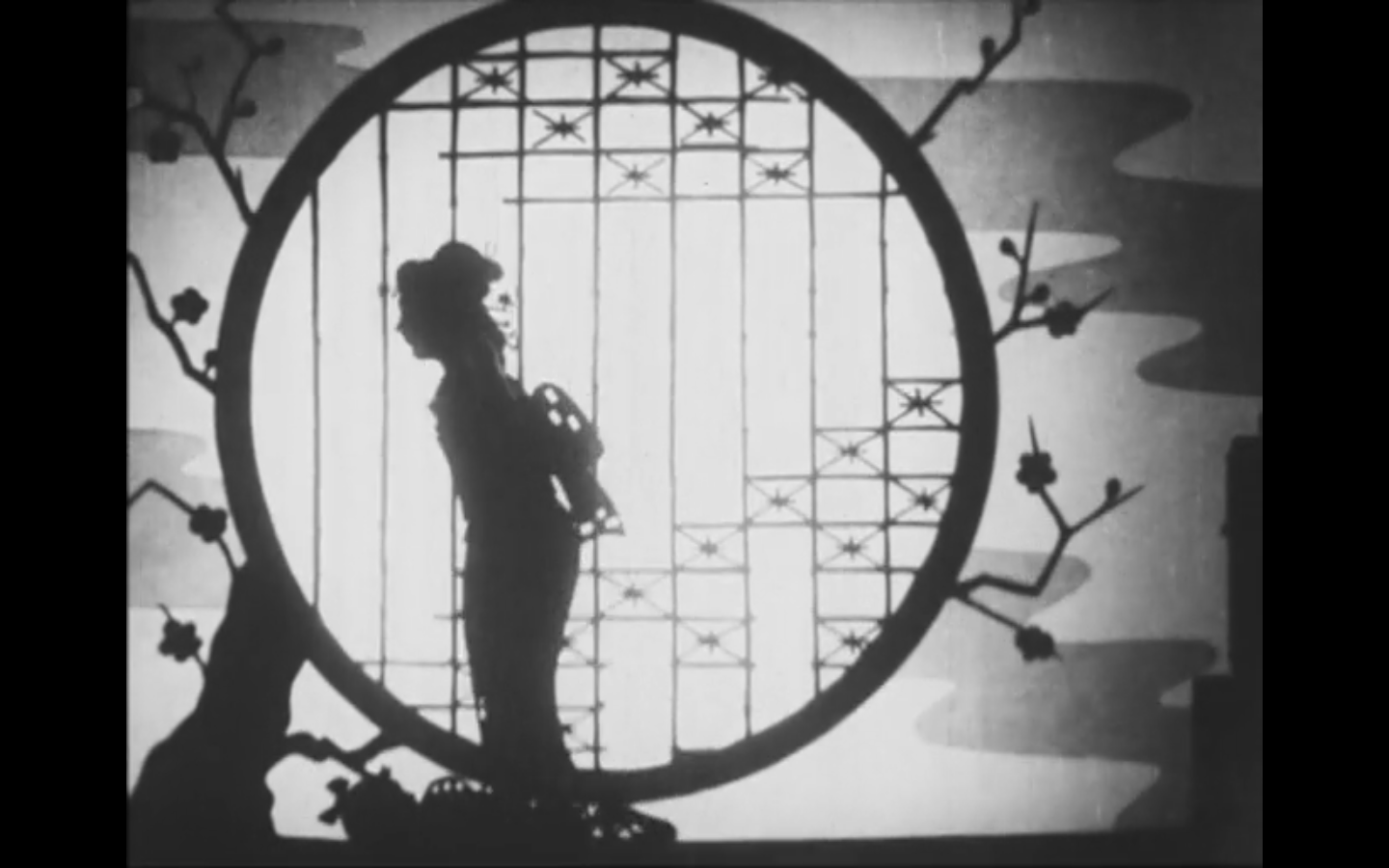
- Directed by: Wagorō Arai
- Music by: Tamaki Miura
- Distributed by: Asahi Eigasha
- Release date: May 16, 1940 (Japan)
- Running time: 12 minutes
- Country: Japan

Madame Butterfly's Illusion (Japanese: お蝶夫人の幻想, Hepburn: Ochōfujin no gensō) is a 1940 Japanese animated short. It was directed by Wagorō Arai, a dentist who created nearly a dozen short films between 1939 and 1947 in the style of silhouette animation. It is based on parts of the opera Madama Butterfly by Giacomo Puccini.

== Plot ==
A Japanese woman reflects on her ill-fated marriage to an American naval officer. She ultimately concludes that "it is better to die with honor than live in shame."

== Production ==
Outside of his work as a dentist, Arai collaborated with a small group of friends (particularly Tobiishi Nakaya) to create roughly one short animated film each year between 1939 and 1947. All of these films are in the style of silhouette animation and many, including Madame Butterfly's Illusion (1940), Jakku to mame no ki (Jack and the Beanstalk, 1941), and Kaguyahime (Princess Kaguya, 1942), are based on popular tales. It is believed that Arai - despite his talents as an animator - stopped creating films soon after World War II because of Tobiishi's untimely death.

The film's Puccini-esque score was composed and performed by renowned Japanese opera singer Tamaki Miura.

== Legacy ==
Arai is the focus of Minami Masatoki's short documentary Arai Wagorō: Kage-e Animēshon no Sekai (Wagorō Arai: His World of Silhouette Animation, 2013), which screened at the Hiroshima International Animation Festival in 2016.

A 35mm print of the film is held in the National Film Archive of Japan and was screened by NFAJ in 2017 alongside animated films by Ōfuji Noburō and Murata Yasuji.
