= Madama Butterfly =

1904 opera by Giacomo Puccini

- Opera by Giacomo Puccini
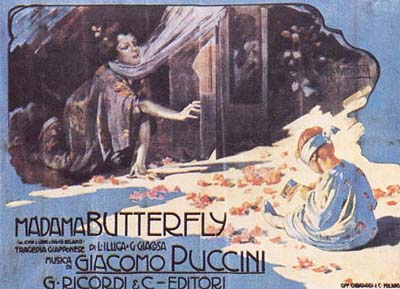
- Original 1904 poster by Adolfo Hohenstein
- Librettist: Luigi Illica; Giuseppe Giacosa
- Language: Italian
- Based on: "Madame Butterfly" (1898) by John Luther Long and Madame Chrysanthème (1887) by Pierre Loti
- Premiere: 17 February 1904; La Scala, Milan

Madama Butterfly (Italian pronunciation: [maˈdaːma ˈbatterflai]; Madame Butterfly) is an opera in three acts (originally two) by Giacomo Puccini, with an Italian libretto by Luigi Illica and Giuseppe Giacosa. The Schickling catalog number is SC 74.

It is based on the short story "Madame Butterfly" (1898) by John Luther Long, which, in turn, was based on stories told to Long by his sister Jennie Correll, and on the semi-autobiographical 1887 French novel Madame Chrysanthème by Pierre Loti. Long's version was dramatized by David Belasco as the one-act play Madame Butterfly: A Tragedy of Japan, which, after premiering in New York in 1900, moved to London, where Puccini saw it in the summer of that year.

The original version of the opera, in two acts, had its premiere on 17 February 1904 at La Scala in Milan. It was poorly received, despite having such notable singers as soprano Rosina Storchio, tenor Giovanni Zenatello and baritone Giuseppe De Luca in lead roles. This was due in part to a late completion by Puccini, which gave inadequate time for rehearsals. Puccini revised the opera, splitting the second act in two, with the Humming Chorus as a bridge to what became Act III, and making other changes. Success ensued, starting with the first performance on 28 May 1904 in Brescia.

== Versions ==
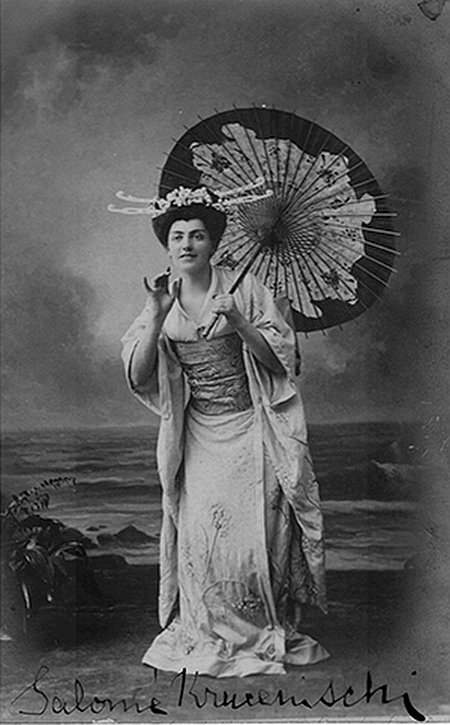
Solomiya Krushelnytska as Butterfly (c. 1904).

Puccini wrote five versions of the opera. Each version is designated with the Schickling catalog number SC 74 with a letter suffix. The original two-act version (SC 74.A), which was presented at the world premiere at La Scala on 17 February 1904, was withdrawn after a disastrous premiere.

Puccini then substantially rewrote it, this time splitting off the second half of the very long second act into a third act. This second version (SC 74.B) was performed on 28 May 1904 in Brescia, where it was a great success, with Solomiya Krushelnytska as Cio-Cio-San.

It was the second version (SC 74.B) that premiered in the United States in 1906, first in Washington, D.C., in October, and then in New York in November, performed by Henry Savage's New English Opera Company (so named because it performed in English-language translations).

In 1906, Puccini wrote a third version (SC 74.C), which was performed at the Metropolitan Opera in New York on 11 February 1907.

Later in 1907, Puccini made several changes in the orchestral and vocal scores, and this became the fourth version (SC 74.D).

Again in 1907, Puccini made his final revisions to the opera in a fifth version (SC 74.E), which has become known as the "Standard Version" and is the one that is most often performed today.

The original 1904 version (SC 74.A) is still occasionally performed, however, such as for the opening of La Scala's 2016–17 season, on 7 December 2016, with Riccardo Chailly conducting. The intent was to recapture and present Puccini's original intended vision for the opera.

== Performance history ==
Premieres of versions of Madama Butterfly in major opera houses throughout the world include the Teatro de la Opera de Buenos Aires on 7 July 1904, under Arturo Toscanini, this being the first performance in the world outside Italy. As in the world premiere in Milan a few months earlier, the protagonist was Rosina Storchio.

The opera's first performance in Britain was in London on 10 July 1905 at the Royal Opera House, Covent Garden, while the first US performance was presented in English on 15 October 1906, in Washington, D.C., at the Columbia Theater. The first performance in New York took place on 12 November of the same year at the Garden Theatre.

The Metropolitan Opera first performed the opera on 11 February 1907 under the supervision of the composer with Geraldine Farrar as Cio-Cio-San, Enrico Caruso as Pinkerton, Louise Homer as Suzuki, Antonio Scotti as Sharpless, with Arturo Vigna conducting; Madama Butterfly has since been heard virtually every season at the Met except for a hiatus during World War II from 1942 through 1945 due to the hostilities between the United States and Japan.

The first Canadian performance was in April 1907 at Princess Theatre in Toronto by the H. W. Savage Company. The first Australian performance was presented at the Theatre Royal in Sydney on 26 March 1910, starring Amy Eliza Castles.

Between 1915 and 1920, Japan's best-known opera singer Tamaki Miura won international fame for her performances as Cio-Cio-San. A memorial to this singer, along with one to Puccini, can be found in the Glover Garden in the port city of Nagasaki, where the opera is set.

== Roles ==
Roles, voice types, premiere cast
Role	Voice type	Premiere cast, 17 February 1904 Conductor: Cleofonte Campanini	Brescia cast, 28 May 1904 Conductor: Cleofonte Campanini
Cio-Cio-San (Madama Butterfly)	soprano	Rosina Storchio	Solomiya Krushelnytska
Suzuki, her maid	mezzo	Giuseppina Giaconia	Giovanna Lucaszewska
B.F. Pinkerton, Lt. in the U.S. Navy	tenor	Giovanni Zenatello	Giovanni Zenatello
Sharpless, U.S. consul at Nagasaki	baritone	Giuseppe De Luca	Virgilio Bellatti
Goro, a matchmaker	tenor	Gaetano Pini-Corsi	Gaetano Pini-Corsi
Prince Yamadori	baritone	Emilio Venturini	Fernando Gianoli Galletti
The Bonze, Cio-Cio-san's uncle	bass	Paolo Wulman	Giuseppe Tisci-Rubini
Yakusidé, Cio-Cio-san's uncle	bass	Antonio Volponi	Fernando Gianoli Galletti
The Imperial Commissioner	bass	Aurelio Viale	Luigi Bolpagni
The Official Registrar	bass	Ettore Gennari	Anselmo Ferrari
Cio-Cio-san's mother	mezzo	Tina Alasia	Serena Pattini
The aunt	soprano	?	Adele Bergamasco
The cousin	soprano	Palmira Maggi	Carla Grementieri
Kate Pinkerton	mezzo	Margherita Manfredi	Emma Decima
Dolore ("Trouble", "Pain" in italian), Cio-Cio-san's son	silent	Ersilia Ghissoni	Ersilia Ghissoni
Cio-Cio-san's relatives and friends and servants

== Synopsis ==
=== Act 1 ===
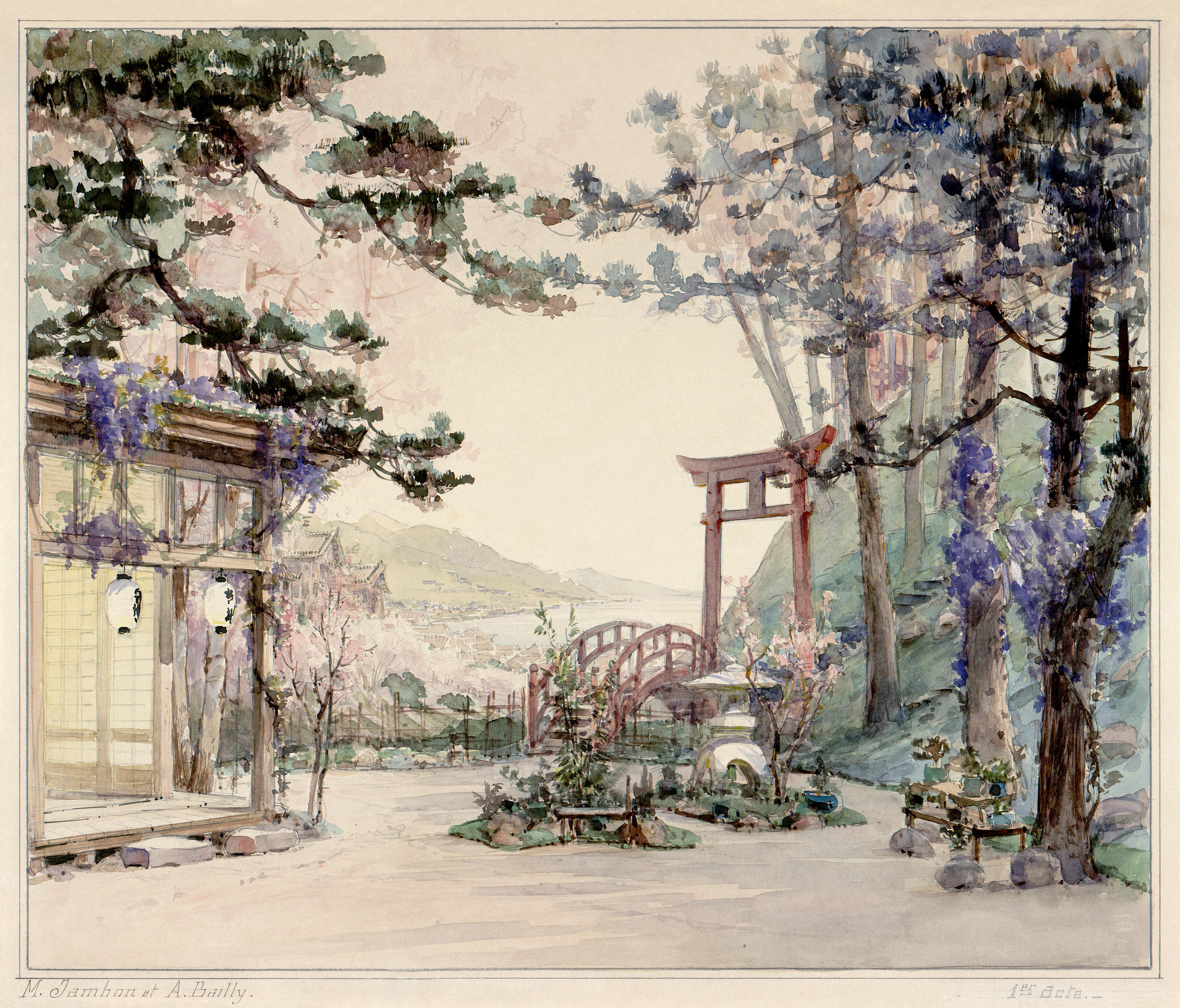
Set design by Bailly and Jambon for Act I in the 1906 production

In 1904, a U.S. naval officer named Pinkerton rents a house on a hill in Nagasaki, Japan, for himself and his soon-to-be wife, "Butterfly". Her real name is Cio-Cio-San (from the Japanese word for "butterfly" (蝶々, chōchō; pronounced [tɕoꜜːtɕoː]); -san is a plain honorific). She is a 15-year-old Japanese girl whom he is marrying for convenience, and he intends to leave her once he finds a proper American wife, since Japanese divorce laws are very lenient. The wedding is to take place at the house. Butterfly had been so excited to marry an American that she had earlier secretly converted from Buddhism to Christianity. After the wedding ceremony, her uninvited uncle, a bonze, who has found out about her conversion, comes to the house, curses her and orders all the guests to leave, which they do while renouncing her. Pinkerton and Butterfly sing a love duet and prepare to spend their first night together.

=== Act 2 ===
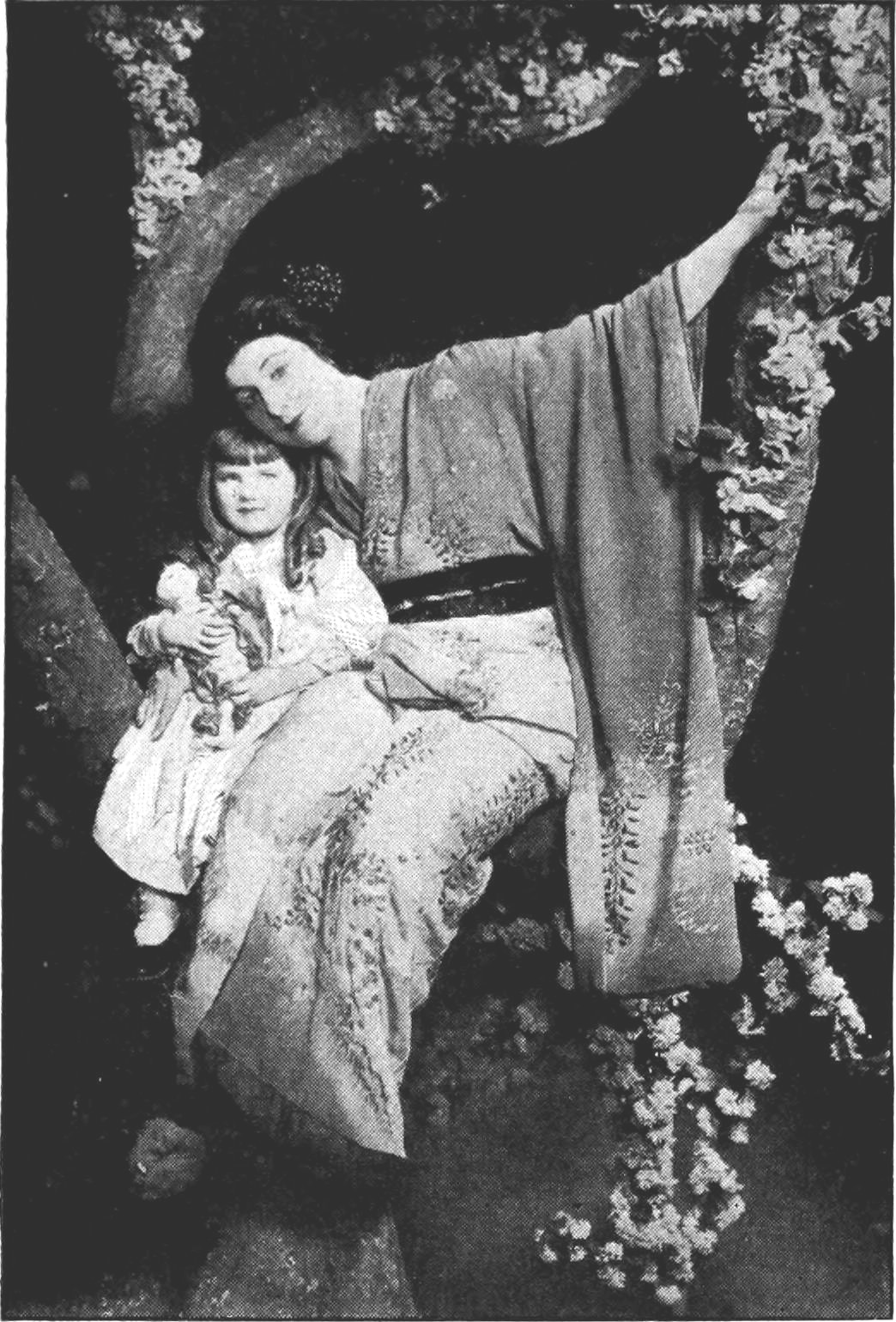
Butterfly and her son 'Trouble' (Dolore) in 1917

Pinkerton left shortly after the wedding, and three years later, Butterfly is still waiting for him to return. Her maid Suzuki keeps trying to convince her that he is not coming back, but Butterfly does not believe her. Goro, the marriage broker who arranged her marriage, keeps trying to marry her off again, but she does not listen to him either. The American consul, Sharpless, comes to the house with a letter, which he has received from Pinkerton who asks him to break some news to Butterfly: that Pinkerton is not coming back to Japan. However, Sharpless cannot bring himself to finish it. Sharpless asks Butterfly what she would do if Pinkerton were not to return. She then reveals that she gave birth to Pinkerton's son after he had left and asks Sharpless to tell him.

From the hill house, Butterfly sees Pinkerton's ship arriving in the harbour. She and Suzuki prepare for his arrival, and then they wait. Suzuki and the child fall asleep, but Butterfly stays up all night waiting for him to arrive.

=== Act 3 ===
Suzuki wakes up in the morning and Butterfly finally falls asleep. Sharpless and Pinkerton arrive at the house, along with Pinkerton's new American wife, Kate. They have come because Kate has agreed to raise the child. But, as Pinkerton sees how Butterfly has decorated the house for his return, he realizes he has made a huge mistake. He admits that he is a coward and cannot face her, leaving Suzuki, Sharpless, and Kate to break the news to Butterfly. Agreeing to give up her child if Pinkerton comes himself to see her, Butterfly prays before statues of her ancestral gods, says goodbye to her son, and blindfolds him. She places a small American flag in his hands and goes behind a screen, stabbing herself with her father's tantō. Pinkerton rushes in, but he is too late, and Butterfly dies.

== Musical numbers ==
Music from Madama Butterfly
"Un bel dì" (One fine day)
Recorded in 1919, performed by Rosa Ponselle with orchestra

No. 2: "E son molti i parenti?"

No. 3: "Ed è bella la sposa?"

No. 4: "Ecco. Son giunte"/"Ancora un passo"

No. 5: "Nessuno si confessa"

No. 6: "Vieni, amor mio"

No. 7: "Tutti zitti!"

No. 8: "Cio-Cio-San! Cio-Cio-San!"

No. 9: "Viene la sera"

No. 10: "Stolta paura ..."

No. 11: "Io t'ho ghermita"

No. 12: "E Izaghi ed Izanami"

No. 13: "Perché con tante cure"

No. 14: "Un bel dì vedremo"

No. 15: "C'è. Entrate."

No. 16: "Yamadori ancor le pene ..."

No. 17: "Ora a noi. Sedete qui"

No. 18: "E questo?... e questo?..."

No. 19: "Io scendo al piano"

No. 20: "Una nave da guerra..."

No. 21: "Spoglio è l'orto"

No. 22: "Nello shosi or farem"

No. 23: "Intermezzo"

No. 24: "Oh eh! oh eh!"

No. 25: "Chi sia?"

No. 26: "Sì, tutto in un istante"

No. 27: "Tu Suzuki ..."

No. 28: "Il bimbo ove sia?"
Performed in 1929 by La Scala Orchestra and Chorus, conducted by Lorenzo Molajoli

=== Act 1 ===
1. Orchestral prelude.
2. E soffitto e pareti ("And ceiling and walls").
3. Dovunque al mondo ("Throughout the world").
4. Amore o grillo ("Love or fancy").
5. Ancora un passo ("One step more").
6. Gran ventura ("May good fortune attend you").
7. L'Imperial Commissario ("The Imperial Commissioner").
8. Vieni, amor mio! ("Come, my love!").
9. Ieri son salita tutta sola ("Yesterday, I went all alone").
10. Tutti zitti ("Quiet everyone").
11. Madama Butterfly.
12. Cio-Cio-san!.
13. Bimba, Bimba, non piangere ("Sweetheart, sweetheart, do not weep").
13A. Viene la sera ("Night is falling").
14. Bimba dagli occhi pieni di malia ("Sweetheart, with eyes full of enchantment"). (The long duet continues.)
15. Vogliatemi bene ("Love me, please.").

=== Act 2 ===
16. E Izaghi ed Izanami ("And Izanagi and Izanami").
17. Un bel dì, vedremo ("One fine day we shall see").
18. C'e. Entrate. ("She is there. Go in.").
19. Yamadori, ancor le pene ("Yamadori, are you not yet...").
20. Ora a noi. ("Now for us.").
21. Due cose potrei far ("Two things I could do").
22. Ah! M'ha scordata? ("Ah! He has forgotten me?").
23. Io scendo al piano. ("I will go now.")
24. Il cannone del porto! ("The cannon at the harbor!", often known as The Flower Duet).
25. Tutti i fior? ("All the flowers?").
26. Or vienmi ad adornar ("Now come to adorn me").
27. Coro a bocca chiusa ("Humming Chorus").

=== Act 3 ===
28. Oh eh! Oh eh! ("Heave-ho! Heave-ho!").
29. Già il sole! ("The Sun's come up!").
30. Io so che alle sue pene ("I know that her pain").
31. Addio, fiorito asil ("Farewell, flowery refuge").
32. Suzuki! Suzuki! ("Suzuki! Suzuki!").
33. Come una mosca ("Like a little fly").
34. Con onor muore ("To die with honor").
35. Tu? Tu? Piccolo iddio! ("You? You? My little god!").

== Instrumentation ==
Madama Butterfly is scored for three flutes (the third doubling piccolo); two oboes, English horn; two clarinets in B-flat; bass clarinet in B-flat, two bassoons; four French horns in F; three trumpets in F; three tenor trombones; bass trombone; a percussion section with timpani, cymbals, triangle, snare drum, bass drum, bells, tam-tam, Japanese gong, and 4 "Japanese Bells"; keyboard glockenspiel; onstage "little bell"; onstage tubular bells; onstage viola d'amore; onstage bird whistles; onstage tam-tam; onstage bass tam-tam; harp; and strings.

== Reception ==
The premiere in Milan was a fiasco, as Puccini's sister, Ramelde, wrote in a letter to her husband:

At two o'clock we went to bed and I can't sleep one bit; and to say that we were all so sure! Giacomo, poor thing, we never saw him because we couldn't go on the stage. We got to the end of it and I don't know how. The second act I didn't hear at all, and before the opera was over, we ran out of the theater.

Called "one of the most terrible flops in the history of Italian opera", the premiere was beset by several bad staging decisions, including the lack of an intermission during the second act. Worst of all was the idea to give audience plants nightingale whistles to deepen the sense of sunrise in the final scene. The audience took the noise as a cue to make their own animal noises.

Some, such as Katherine Hu in an op-ed for The New York Times, have criticized Madama Butterfly for orientalism, noting in particular the perpetuation of harmful stereotypes about East Asian hypersexuality and submissiveness. Hu argues that while doing away with classic works like Madama Butterfly would "destroy the art form, preventing us from reshaping otherwise beautiful compositions in powerful ways," opera houses should serve as museums and classrooms, presenting works in a way that helps audiences be aware of their problematic histories.

Today Madama Butterfly is the sixth most performed opera in the world and considered a masterpiece, with Puccini's orchestration praised as limpid, fluent and refined.

== Adaptations ==
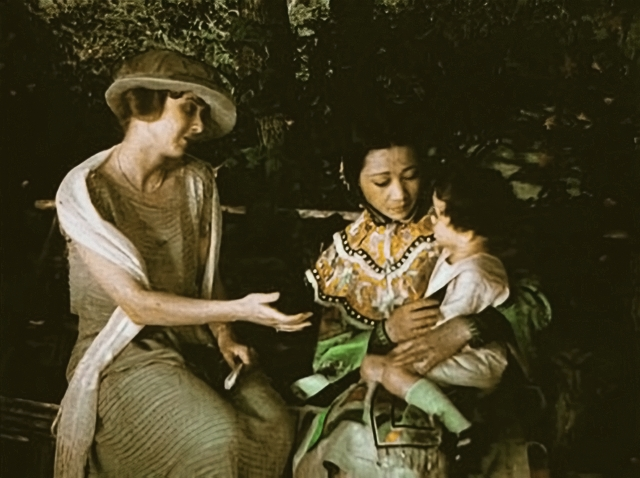
Anna May Wong holding the child in the 1922 film The Toll of the Sea

- 1909: Sao Krua Fah (สาวเครือฟ้า), a Thai adaptation of Madama Butterfly written by Prince Narathip Praphanphong. The play is set in Chiang Mai and centers on a romance between a Northern Thai dancer and a soldier from Bangkok. Further adaptations of Sao Krua Fah have since been made, such as a 16 mm film in 1965 starring Mitr Chaibancha and Pisamai Wilaisak.
- 1915: A silent film version was directed by Sidney Olcott and starred Mary Pickford.
- 1919: A silent (tinted) film version (titled Harakiri) directed by Fritz Lang and starring Paul Biensfeldt, Lil Dagover, Georg John and Niels Prien.
- 1922: A silent color film, The Toll of the Sea, based on the opera/play was released. This movie, which starred Anna May Wong in her first leading role, moved the storyline to China. It was the second two-color Technicolor motion picture ever released and the first film made using Technicolor Process 2.
- 1931: Concise Chōchō-san by the Takarazuka Revue
- 1932: Madame Butterfly, a non-singing drama (with ample portions of Puccini's score in the musical underscoring) made by Paramount starring Sylvia Sidney and Cary Grant in black & white.
- 1940: Ochō Fujin no Gensō (お蝶夫人の幻想) "Madame Butterfly's Illusion", a 12-minute Japanese silhouette animation film.
- 1954: Madame Butterfly, a screen adaptation of the opera, directed by Carmine Gallone jointly produced by Italy's Cineriz and Japan's Toho. The film was shot in Technicolor at Cinecittà in Rome, Italy. Starring Japanese actress Kaoru Yachigusa as Cio-Cio San and Italian tenor Nicola Filacuridi as Pinkerton, and with Japanese actors and Italian actors, dubbed by Italian opera singers.
- 1974: Madama Butterfly, a German television adaptation of the opera starring Mirella Freni and Plácido Domingo, directed by Jean-Pierre Ponnelle and conducted by Herbert von Karajan.
- 1984: "Madam Butterfly (Un bel dì vedremo)" is a song by Malcolm McLaren, an electronic interpretation of the aria "Un bel dì vedremo" from Madama Butterfly. It was released as a single from McLaren's 1984 album Fans, and reached number 13 on the UK Singles Chart and No. 19 on the US Dance Singles Chart.
- 1988: The play M. Butterfly by David Henry Hwang is partially based on Madama Butterfly as well as the story of French diplomat Bernard Boursicot and the Beijing opera singer Shi Pei Pu. In 1993, the play was adapted into a film of the same name by David Cronenberg.
- 1989: Miss Saigon, a musical by Claude-Michel Schönberg and Alain Boublil, is inspired by the opera, focusing on a doomed romance between an American Marine and a Vietnamese bargirl and transporting the action to the end and aftermath of the Vietnam War.
- 1995: Frédéric Mitterrand directed a film version of the opera, Madame Butterfly, in Tunisia, North Africa, starring Richard Troxell and Chinese singer Ying Huang in the lead roles.
- 1995: Australian choreographer Stanton Welch created a ballet, inspired by the opera, for The Australian Ballet.
- 1996: The album Pinkerton by the rock band Weezer is based loosely on the opera.
- 2004: On the 100th anniversary of Madama Butterfly, Shigeaki Saegusa composed Jr. Butterfly to a libretto by Masahiko Shimada.
- 2011: Cho cho san is a Japanese novel, and TV drama series based on the novel, written by Shinichi Ichikawa. Based on the original opera, the story depicts the sorrowful love and turbulent life of a samurai's daughter who loses her parents at a young age and becomes the apprentice of a geisha, set in the early Meiji era in Nagasaki, Japan. It stars Japanese actress Aoi Miyazaki as Cho Ito (Cho cho san).
- 2013: Cho Cho, musical drama by Daniel Keene, music by Cheng Jin, set in 1930s Shanghai.
- 2021: Mariposa, an operatic dance-drama set in post-revolution Cuba where a local rent boy and a foreign sailor fall in love.
- 2026: Bastion Butterfly, novella set in Malta during WW2 written by A.K.Lakelett. Based on the original opera, the story depicts a young Maltese girl falling in love with an American naval officer. Love and despair, heartbreak and a chance for Butterfly to live beyond sorrow.
