= Madame Butterfly (1915 film) =

1915 film by Sidney Olcott

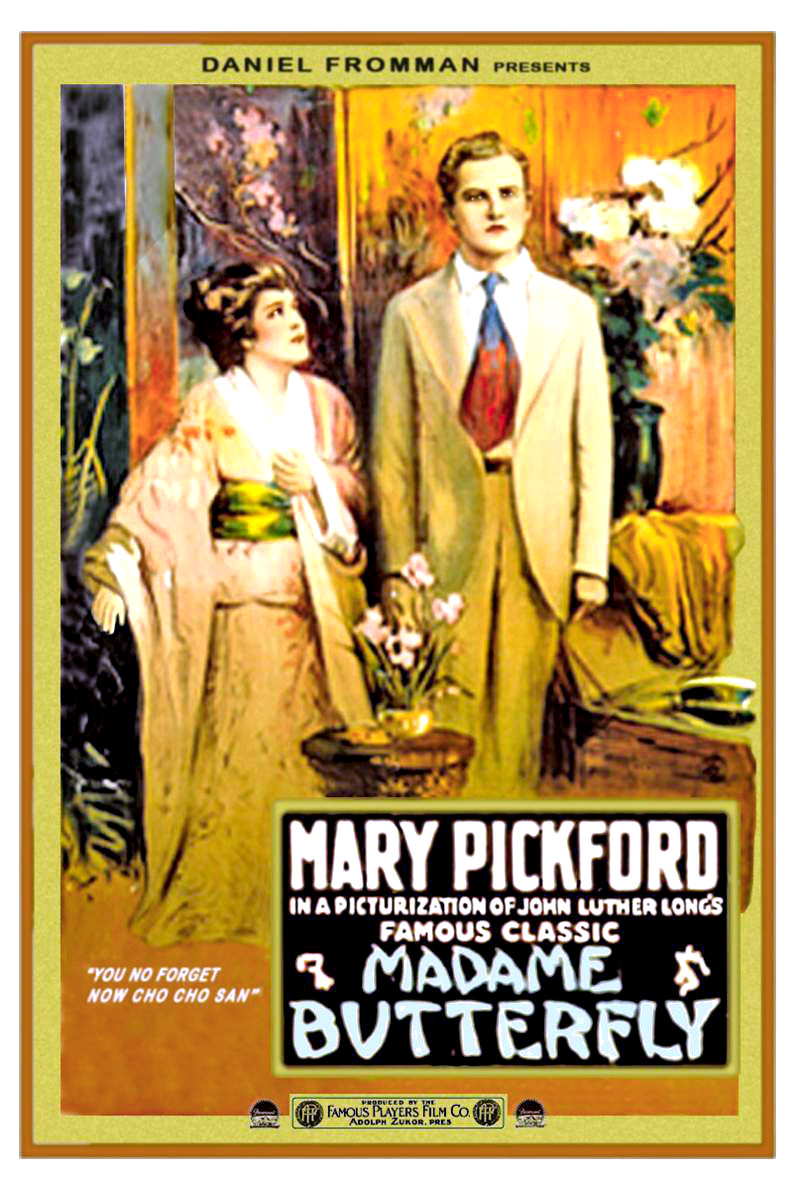
- Theatrical poster
- Directed by: Sidney Olcott
- Written by: John Luther Long (story)
- Produced by: Daniel Frohman; Adolph Zukor
- Starring: Mary Pickford
- Distributed by: Paramount Pictures
- Release date: November 7, 1915
- Running time: 61 minutes
- Country: United States
- Languages: Silent film English intertitles

Madame Butterfly

Madame Butterfly is a 1915 silent film directed by Sidney Olcott. The film is based on the 1898 short story "Madame Butterfly" by John Luther Long and the opera Madama Butterfly.

== Production ==
Reportedly, leading actress Mary Pickford fought constantly with Sidney Olcott about the character. Olcott wanted Pickford to be more reserved and thought she was "too Americanized to play a Japanese".

== Plot ==
The film takes place in Japan in 1904. Lieutenant Pinkerton (Marshall Neilan) marries Cho-Cho-San 'Butterfly' (Mary Pickford), a 15-year-old Japanese geisha. Cho-Cho-San is lucky with her new husband and takes the marriage very seriously. Pinkterton, however, regards it as entertainment. He is not in love with her and plans to break off the wedding in a month. The American Consul (William T. Carleton) begs him to break off the wedding as soon as possible, to avoid hurting her feelings. The lieutenant laughs him off.

After Pinkerton forces Cho-Cho-San to end their wedding reception early, her disapproving family disowns her. When Pinkerton is ordered to return to America, he promises Cho-Cho-San he will return before he leaves. Three years go by. Cho-Cho-San, now a mother, still believes Pinkerton will return someday, while he is engaged to an American woman. He sends her a letter to announce he will marry another woman, but Cho-Cho-San can't read.

Meanwhile, The Prince of Japan (David Burton) takes interest in Cho-Cho-San, but she refuses his company and claims she is still waiting for her husband. Sometime later, Pinkerton returns to Japan but he hands the American Consul some money as compensation for Cho-Cho-San and leaves again. When Cho-Cho-San comes to ask about her husband, she runs into Pinkerton's new American wife. The American woman asks Cho-Cho-San to give them her child, as he will be given better opportunities and prosperity under their parenting. Cho-Cho-San is crushed but complies and hands over her child. She kills herself in the final scene by walking into a river and drowning.

== Cast ==
- Mary Pickford - Cho-Cho-San
- Marshall Neilan - Lieutenant Pinkerton
- Olive West - Suzuki
- Jane Hall - Adelaide
- Lawrence Wood - Cho-Cho-San's father
- Caroline Harris - Cho-Cho-San's mother
- M.W. Rale - The Nakodo
- William T. Carleton - The American Consul
- David Burton - The Prince
- Cesare Gravina - The Soothsayer
- Frank Dekum - Naval officer

== Home media ==
Madame Butterfly was released on Region 0 DVD-R by Alpha Video on July 7, 2015.
