= John Luther Long =

American lawyer and writer (1861-1927)

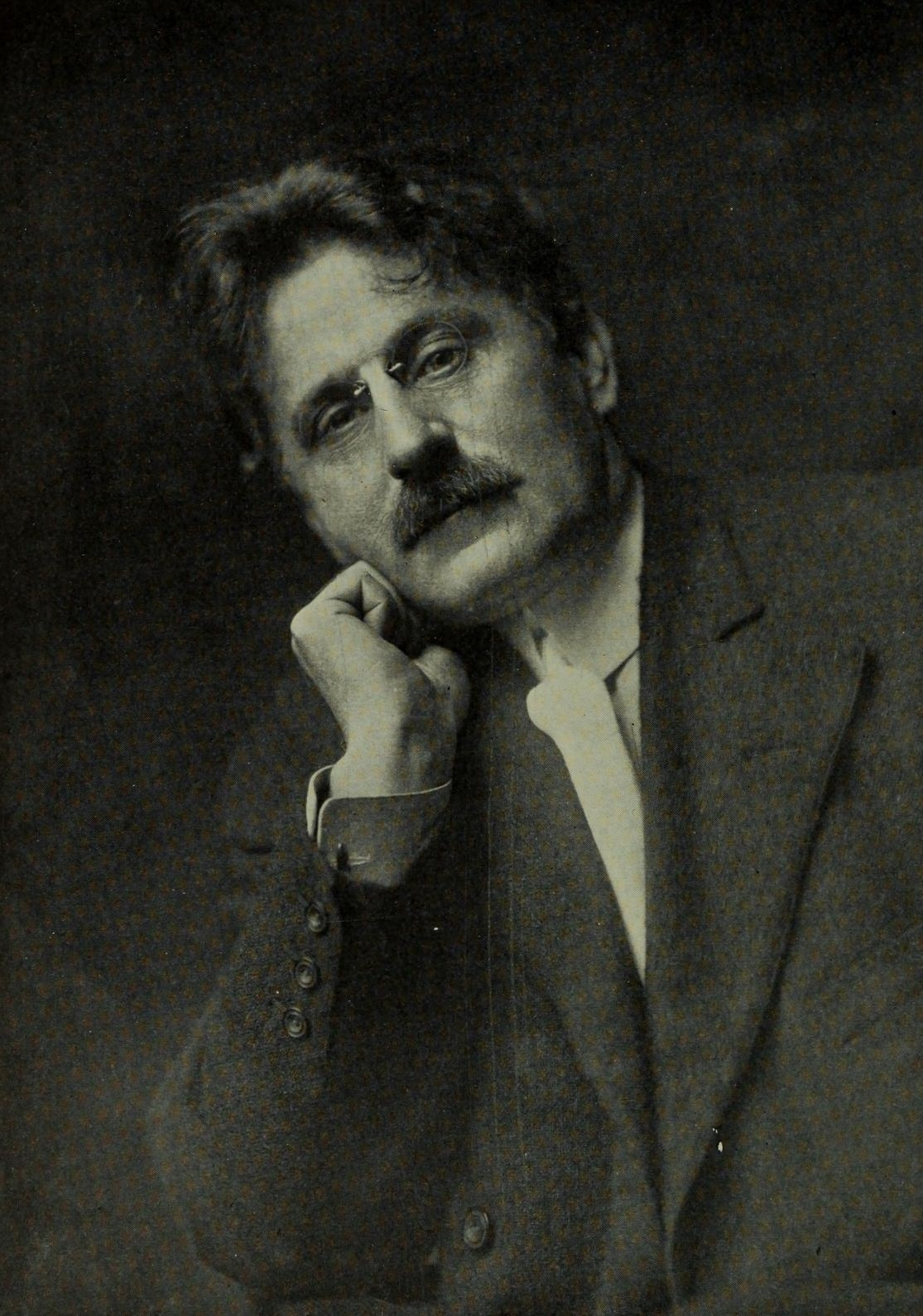
John Luther Long

John Luther Long (January 1, 1861 – October 31, 1927) was an American lawyer and writer best known for his short story "Madame Butterfly", which was based on the recollections of his sister, Jennie Correll, who had been to Japan with her husband—a Methodist missionary.

== Biography ==
Born in Hanover, Pennsylvania, Long had been admitted to the bar in Philadelphia on October 29, 1881, and become a practicing lawyer. On January 17, 1882, he married Mary Jane Sprenkle. He died at age 66 on October 31, 1927, having spent the last two months of his life at a sanatorium in Clifton Springs, New York. The obituary in The New York Times of November 1, 1927, quoted his own interpretation of himself as "a sentimentalist, and a feminist and proud of it".

With David Belasco he wrote the four act play Andrea which starred Mrs. Leslie Carter and which ran for 123 performances at the first Belasco Theatre. His one act play Dolce was staged at the Manhattan Theater on April 24, 1906, starring Minnie Maddern Fiske.

== Legacy ==
The Harry Ransom Humanities Research Center has an extensive collection of his papers including correspondence and literary projects.

== Plays ==
- Andrea, written with David Belasco
- Dolce, a one act play
- Kassa
- The Darling of the Gods and Andrea
