= Belle Archer =

American actress and singer

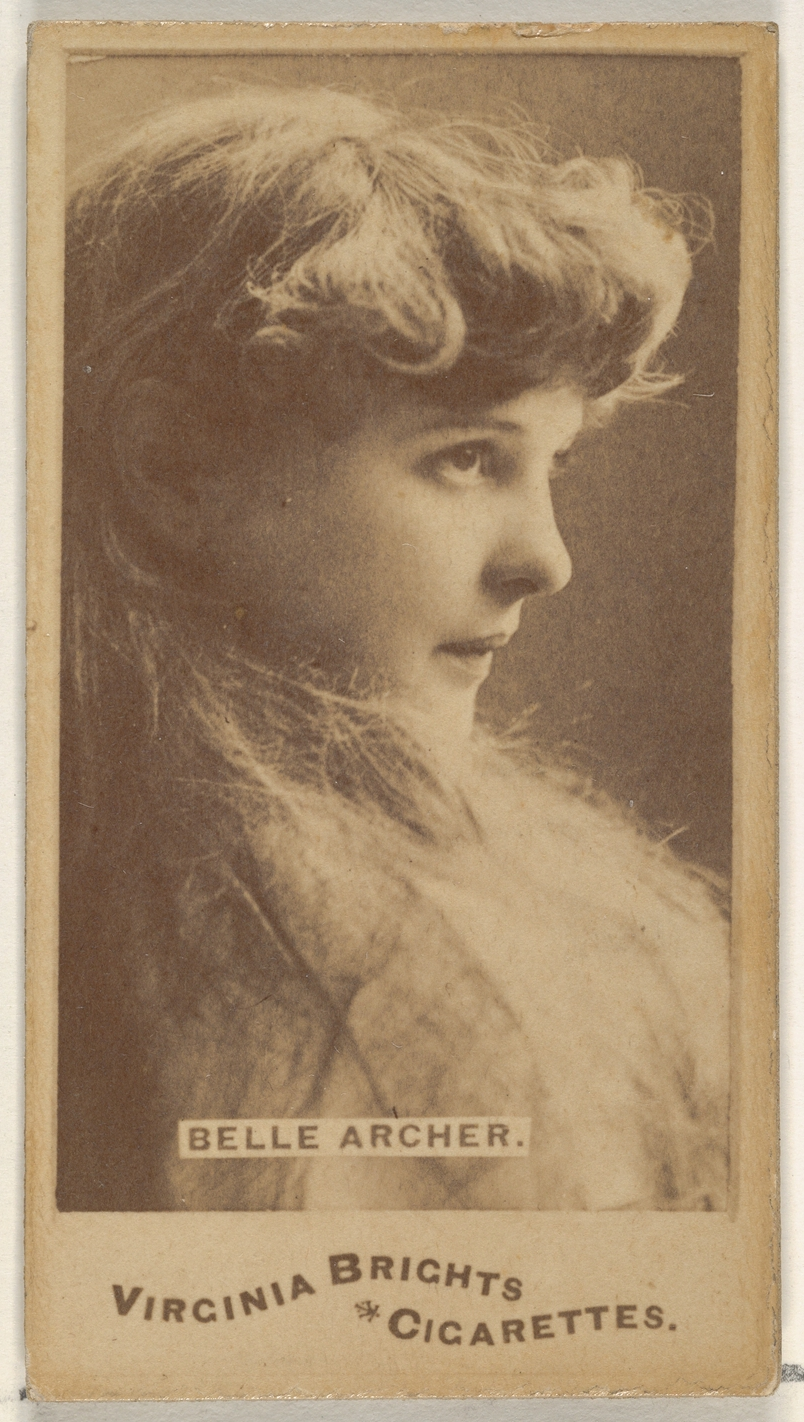
Belle Archer, from the Actors and Actresses series (N45, Type 1) for Virginia Brights Cigarettes

Belle Archer (née Mingle; June 5, 1859 — September 19, 1900) was an American actress and singer. She was also known as Belle Mackenzie. She was notable for starring in a three-year, cross-country touring production of A Contented Woman and for creating the role of Cousin Hebe in H.M.S. Pinafore.

== Early years ==
Archer was born in Easton, Pennsylvania, the daughter of J.L. Mingle, a businessman with Western Union. She grew up in Easton and was educated there. As a youngster, Archer ran away from the Philadelphia Normal School with a friend with the goal of joining a theatrical troupe. She was stopped in Baltimore, however, and taken back to her home.

== Career ==
Before she was 16 years old, Archer debuted on stage in Baltimore under theater manager John T. Ford. In 1879, billed as Belle Mackenzie, "she had created the role of Cousin Hebe" when the comic opera H.M.S. Pinafore premiered in Philadelphia. As early as 1881, she was performing in New York City in the play Won at Last.

In 1882, she was signed to a three-year contract with Madison Square Theatre, with her initial role that of heading the production of Hazel Kirke. Archer became the leading lady for actor Charles H. Hoyt, succeeding his wife, Caroline Miskel Hoyt. She also starred in A Contented Woman, touring the United States for three years in that production, and acted for about two years each with companies headed by E.H. Sothern and Alexander Salvini.

An article in the March 1899 issue of Munsey's Magazine credited Archer with being the first female press agent. "Besides being a clever actress," it said, Miss Archer has the distinction of having opened a new field for woman's work. This was in 1893, when she went in advance of Carrie Turner as press agent."

In 1888, Archer received $1,200 per year from a New York photographer for the right to print photographs of her.

== Personal life ==
On September 19, 1880, she married actor H.R. Archer in Norfolk, Virginia. They met when he joined a theatrical company in which she was acting, and they married soon afterward.

== Death ==
On September 19, 1900, Archer died in the Warren, Pennsylvania, emergency hospital following a blood clot on her brain. She was buried in the family plot in Easton Cemetery, Easton, Pennsylvania. The cemetery contains a six-foot-tall stone with "a coin-shaped profile" of Archer. The statue contains the epitaph, "To the name Belle Archer, the master leaning reached a hand and whispered, 'It is finished.'"
