= A Trip to Chinatown (film) =

1926 film by Robert P. Kerr

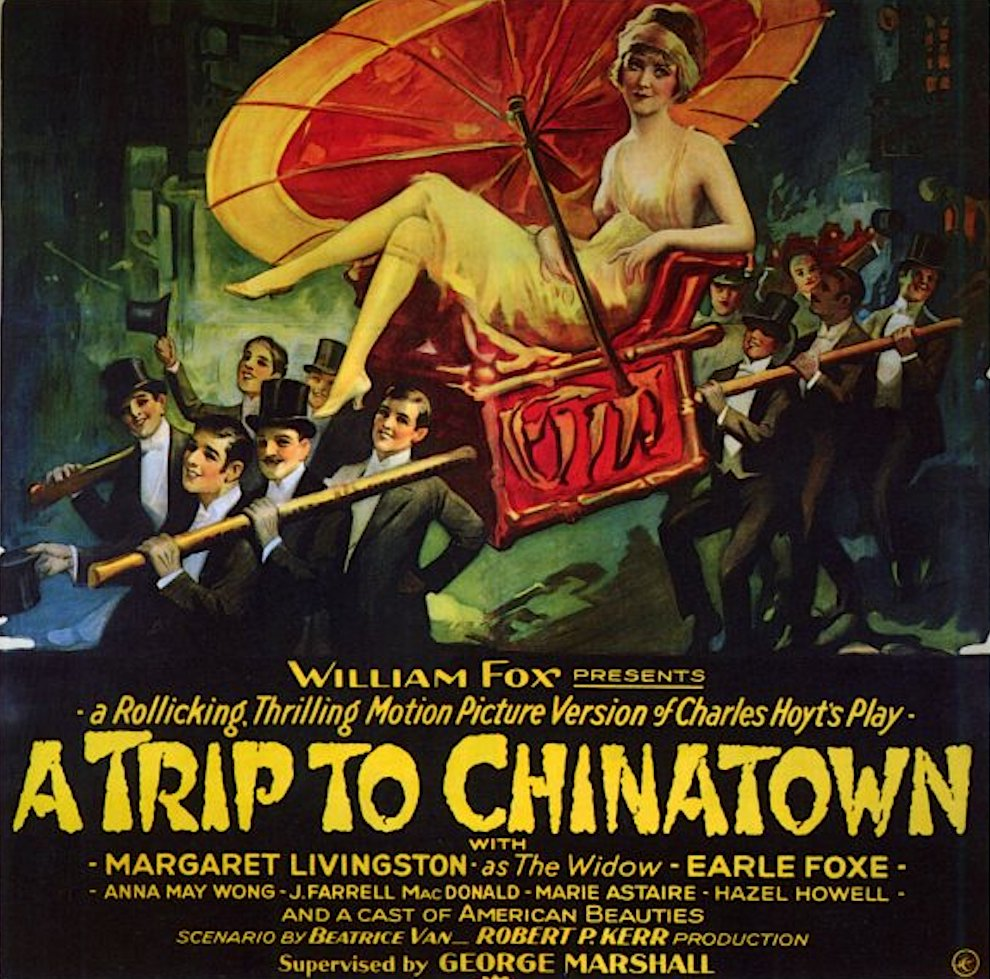
- 1926 theatrical poster
- Directed by: Robert P. Kerr
- Written by: Beatrice Van
- Based on: A Trip to Chinatown by Charles Hale Hoyt
- Produced by: William Fox
- Starring: Margaret Livingston; Earle Foxe; J. Farrell MacDonald
- Cinematography: Barney McGill
- Distributed by: Fox Film
- Release date: June 6, 1926
- Running time: 60 minutes; 6 reels (5,594 feet)
- Country: United States
- Language: Silent (English intertitles)

A Trip to Chinatown is a 1926 American silent comedy film produced and distributed by the Fox Film Corporation and starring Margaret Livingston and Earle Foxe. The supporting cast includes Anna May Wong and Charles Farrell. The movie was scripted by Beatrice Van from Charles Hale Hoyt's hit 1891 Broadway musical of the same name and directed by Robert P. Kerr.

Livingston played the "Woman from the City" the following year in F. W. Murnau's Sunrise: A Song of Two Humans, the rival to Farrell's future screen partner Janet Gaynor.

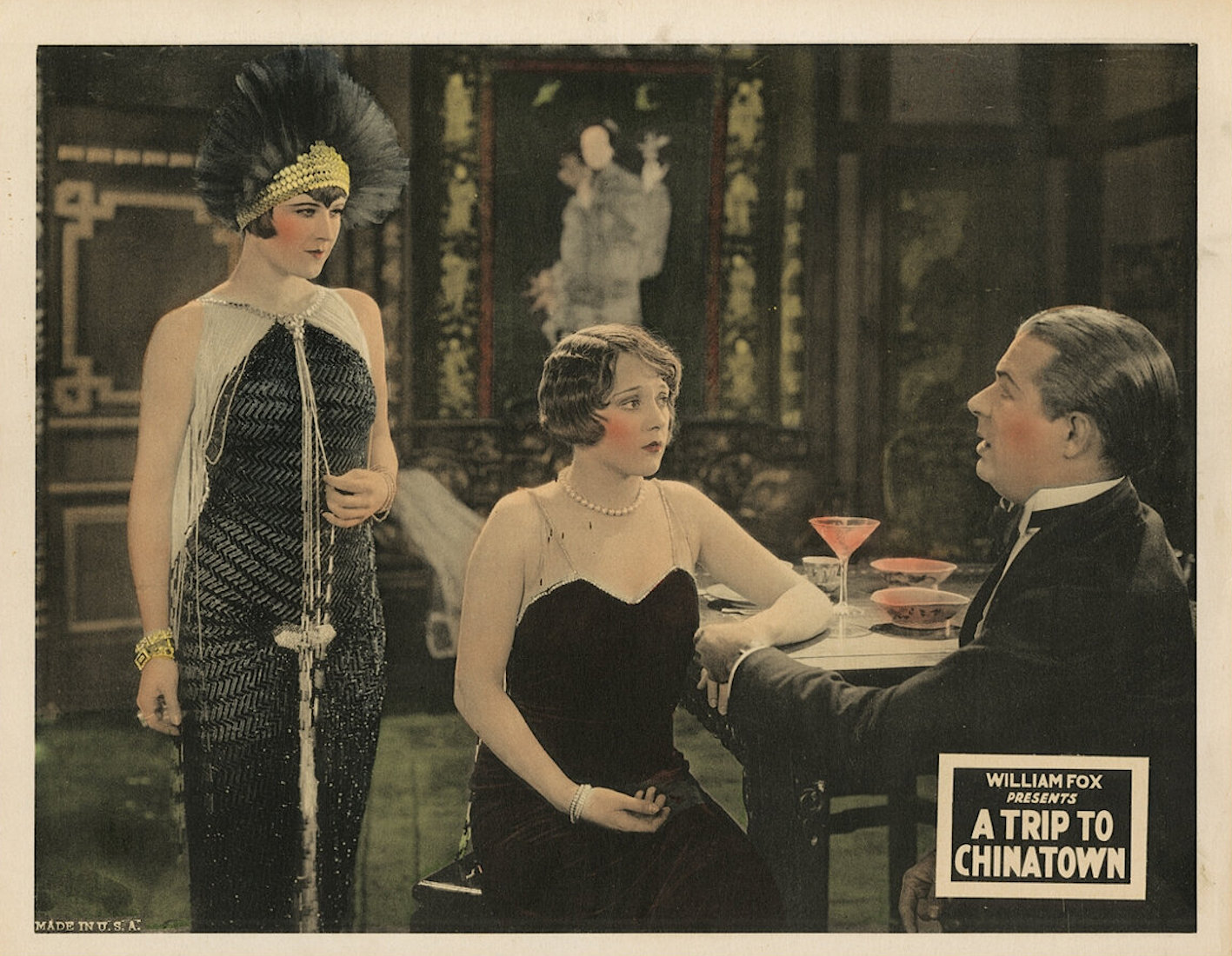
Lobby card for the film.

== Plot ==
As described in a film magazine review, Welland Strong is a young man who is told by his doctor that he has but a short time to live, so he gives away all his effects and goes to San Francisco to visit his rich and lively uncle Benjamin Strong. There he has many adventures which culminate in his agreeing to marry the widow Alicia Cuyer and in his learning that the period of his life is to be greatly extended.

== Cast ==
- Margaret Livingston as Alicia Cuyer
- Earle Foxe as Welland Strong
- J. Farrell MacDonald as Benjamin Strong
- Anna May Wong as Ohati
- Harry Woods as Norman Blood
- Marie Astaire as Rose Blood
- Gladys McConnell as Marion Haste
- Charles Farrell as Gayne Wilder
- Hazel Howell as Henrietta Lott
- Wilson Benge as Slavin
- George Kuwa as Tulung

== Production ==
A Trip to Chinatown was mainly filmed in fall of 1925 before being finished in spring 1926. The film was Robert Kerr's first solo feature length film. Livingston reportedly wore 36 different handmade dresses throughout the film. Outfits matching Livingston's were made for the monkey featured in the film.

== Preservation ==
With no prints of A Trip to Chinatown located in any film archives, it is a lost film.

== See also ==
- 1937 Fox vault fire
