= A Texas Steer (play) =

1890 play by Charles H Hoyt

A Texas Steer is a play written by Charles H. Hoyt in 1890 and opened in Broadway theatres in 1894 after several years of touring across American cities. It was later adapted into an American silent film in 1927.

The play featured in Indianapolis in early 1891 at the city's Grand Opera House to a full audience. As a satirical comedy, it offered a caricatured portrayal of American politics, drawing comparisons to Gilbert and Sullivan's exaggerated style. The play's success prompted additional performances, with tickets selling out quickly.

== Production and cast ==
The play was considered a departure from Hoyt's usual work, with humor taking precedence over singing and dancing, favoring a more straightforward approach to comedy. Women were portrayed with dignity instead of having female characters in skimpy attire. The play's dialogue was described as being sharp and witty and kept the audience engaged. Tim Murphy's portrayal of Maverick Brander, a Texan thrust into politics, was praised for originality and skill. Alongside him, Flora Walsh as "Bossy" added charm and humor in her character's journey to a socialite. Of the supporting cast, Will Bray played "the Minister to Dahomey" and was described as having brought depth and diversity.

== Reception ==
A critic writing for The Indianapolis Journal in 1891 hailed the play as a standout piece for Hoyt, suggesting that it marked a shift by showcasing his ability to write plays beyond farce-comedy and not just primarily for entertainment or financial gain. The Cheyenne Daily Leader made a similar observation in their promotion of the play in 1892, noting that it marked a "notable advance in composition and in literary ability". The Buffalo Courier also praised the play, suggesting that it offered audiences a chance to laugh at the absurdities of power and corruption.

A critic for The Anaconda Standard writing in April 1896 described it as "a good play, well acted", suggesting it would likely be a success with the public with its "immense amount of satire on the political world".
