= Harry Conor =

American actor

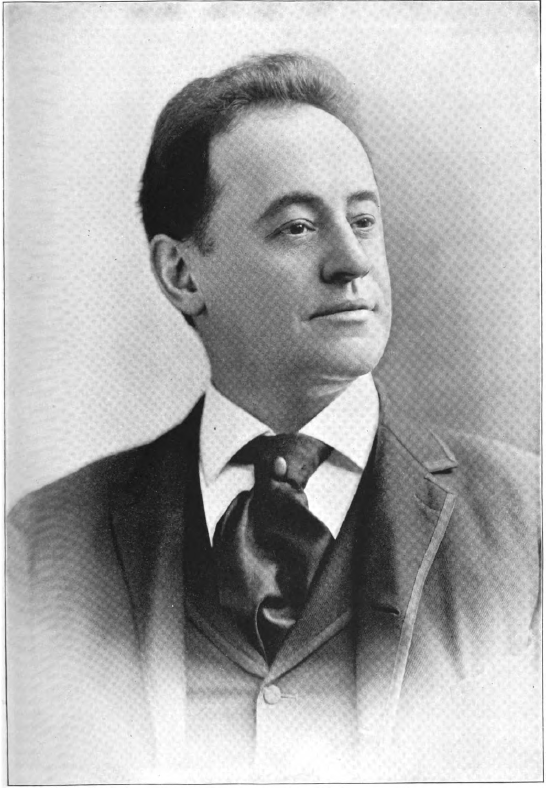
- Harry Conor circa 1893
- Born: c. 1856
- Died: April 1931; Roxbury, Massachusetts
- Occupation(s): Actor, comedian

Harry Conor (c. 1856 – April 1931) was an American comic actor, best known for playing the role of Welland Strong in A Trip to Chinatown.

== Biography ==
Conor grew up in Massachusetts, and began acting at an early age, appearing as a child with William J. Florence in No Thoroughfare. He came to sing comic songs and performed small pieces around Boston. At age 19, he formed his own company to perform a play written for him, and traveled to South Carolina for their first show. According to Conor, seeing a glow in the sky in the wee hours of the night as he arrived in Columbia, he commented on the "beautiful sunrise" only to be told it was local theatre burning down which included all his sets and costumes, which was the end of that first touring company. He later was taken on by Charles Hale Hoyt, with whom Conor worked for 18 years, and who produced A Trip to Chinatown. Conor was also in Hoyt's A Rag Baby, A Tin Soldier, and A Stranger in New York.

His best known performance was in the role of hypochondriac Welland Strong in A Trip to Chinatown (1891), wherein he performed the song "The Bowery". He performed that role for many years and many hundreds of performances both in New York and abroad. He also reprised the role of Welland Strong in 1912's A Winsome Widow.

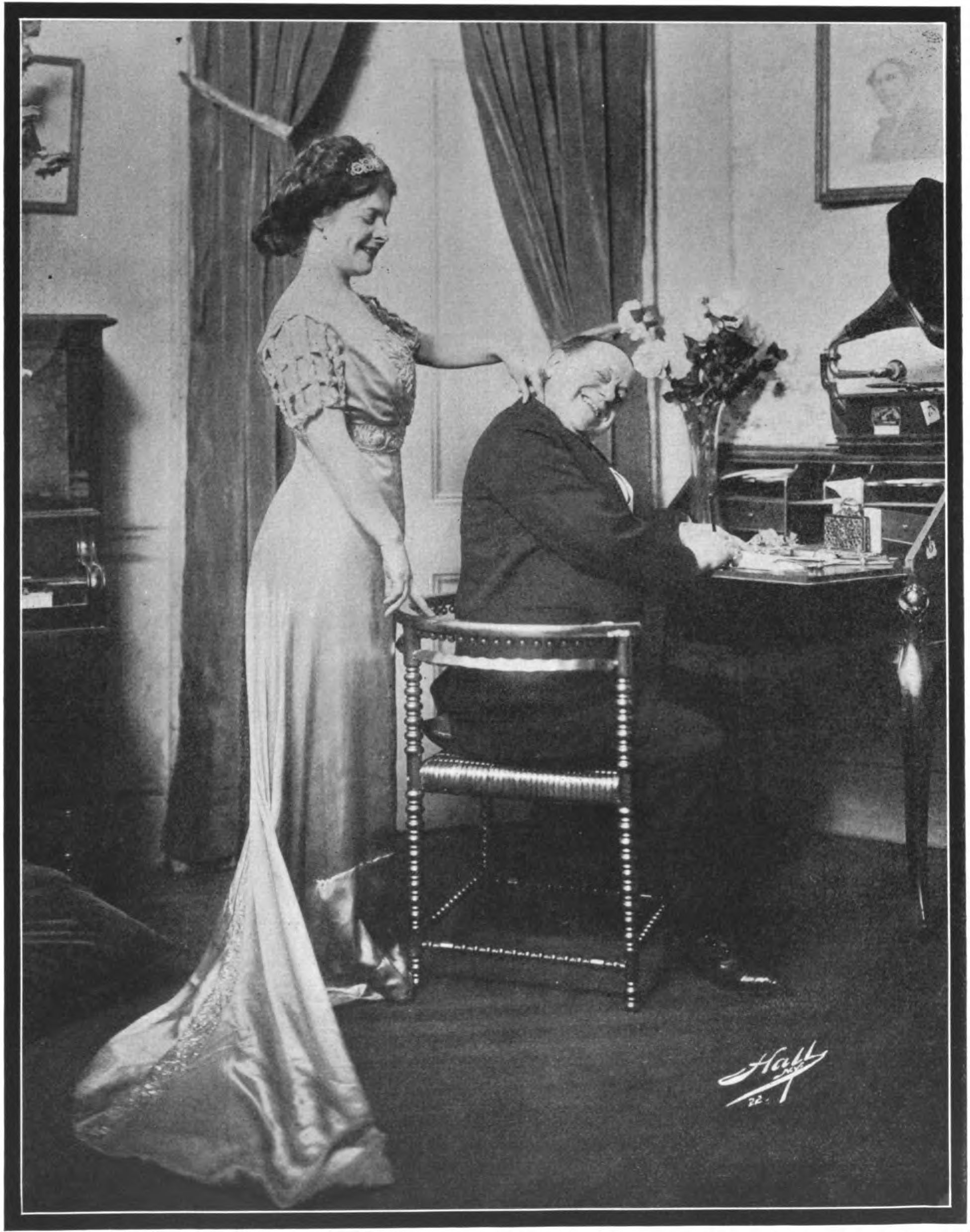
Conor with actress Mabel Barrison in Blue Mouse (1908)

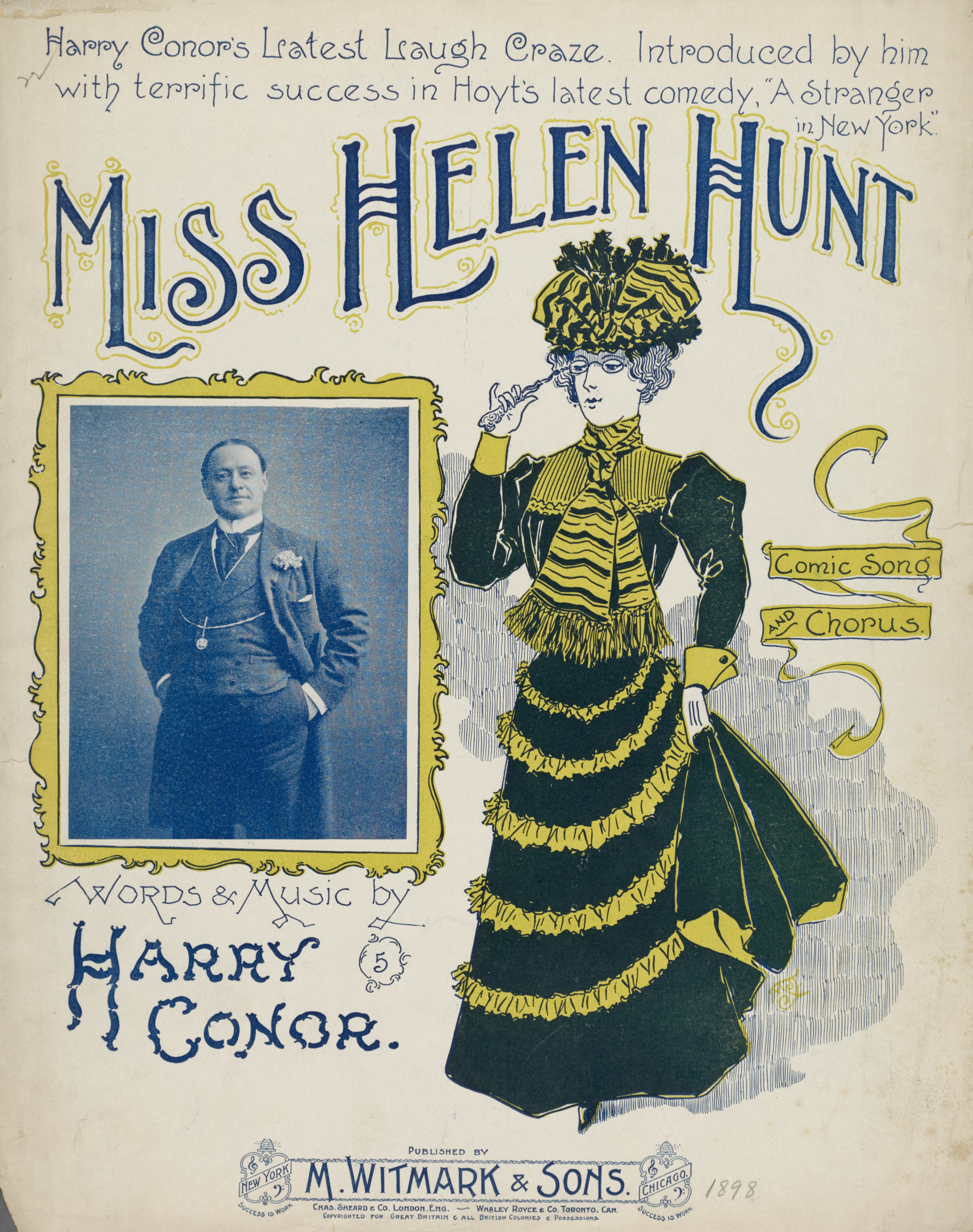
A Stranger in New York advertisement

Other performances included The Blue Mouse (1908) and Lulu's Husbands (1910) with Mabel Barrison. Conor also composed songs including Miss Helen Hunt from A Stranger in New York.

Conor died in Roxbury, Massachusetts, in April 1931 and is little remembered today, though he has a short entry in The Oxford Companion to American Theatre.

== Selected performances ==
- A Rag Baby as the Dude Tramp (1883, Broadway 1884)
- A Tin Soldier as Willie Steele (1885)
- A Trip to Chinatown as Welland Strong (1891)
- A Stranger in New York (1897)
- The Chaperons as Adam Hogg (1902)
- The Blue Mouse (1908)
- Lulu's Husbands (1910)
- Marriage a la Carte (1911)
- A Winsome Widow (1912)
- Alone at Last (1915)
- Fancy Free (1918)
