= A Trip to Chinatown =

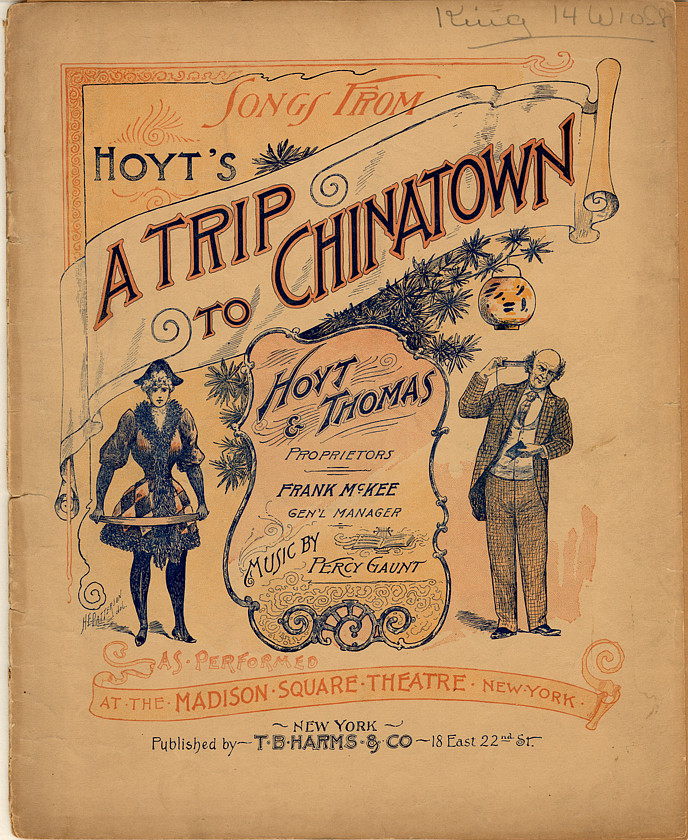
- Cover of Vocal Score
- Music: Percy Gaunt
- Lyrics: Charles H. Hoyt
- Book: Charles H. Hoyt
- Basis: A Day Well Spent by John Oxenford
- Productions: 1891 Broadway

A Trip to Chinatown is a musical comedy in three acts with a book by Charles H. Hoyt, music by Percy Gaunt and lyrics by Hoyt. In addition to the Gaunt and Hoyt score, many songs were interpolated into the score at one time or another during the run, as was fashionable for musicals of the era. The story concerns a widow who accidentally maneuvers two young suburban couples into a big city restaurant and brings romance to them and herself. It is loosely based on an 1835 English one-act farce, A Day Well Spent, by John Oxenford.

After almost a year of touring, the musical opened at Broadway’s Madison Square Theatre on November 9, 1891, and ran for 657 performances, or just short of two years. This was the longest-running Broadway musical in history up to that time (although London had seen a few longer runs), and it held that record until Irene in 1919. The show was such a hit that several road companies played it throughout the country simultaneously with the Broadway production, and at one point a second company was even opened in New York while the original company was still performing on Broadway. The cast included Trixie Friganza and Harry Conor, who introduced the song "The Bowery". The musical also ran in London for 125 performances.

A version of the show was produced in 1912 under the title A Winsome Widow, and a film adaptation featuring Anna May Wong was made in 1926.

== Background ==
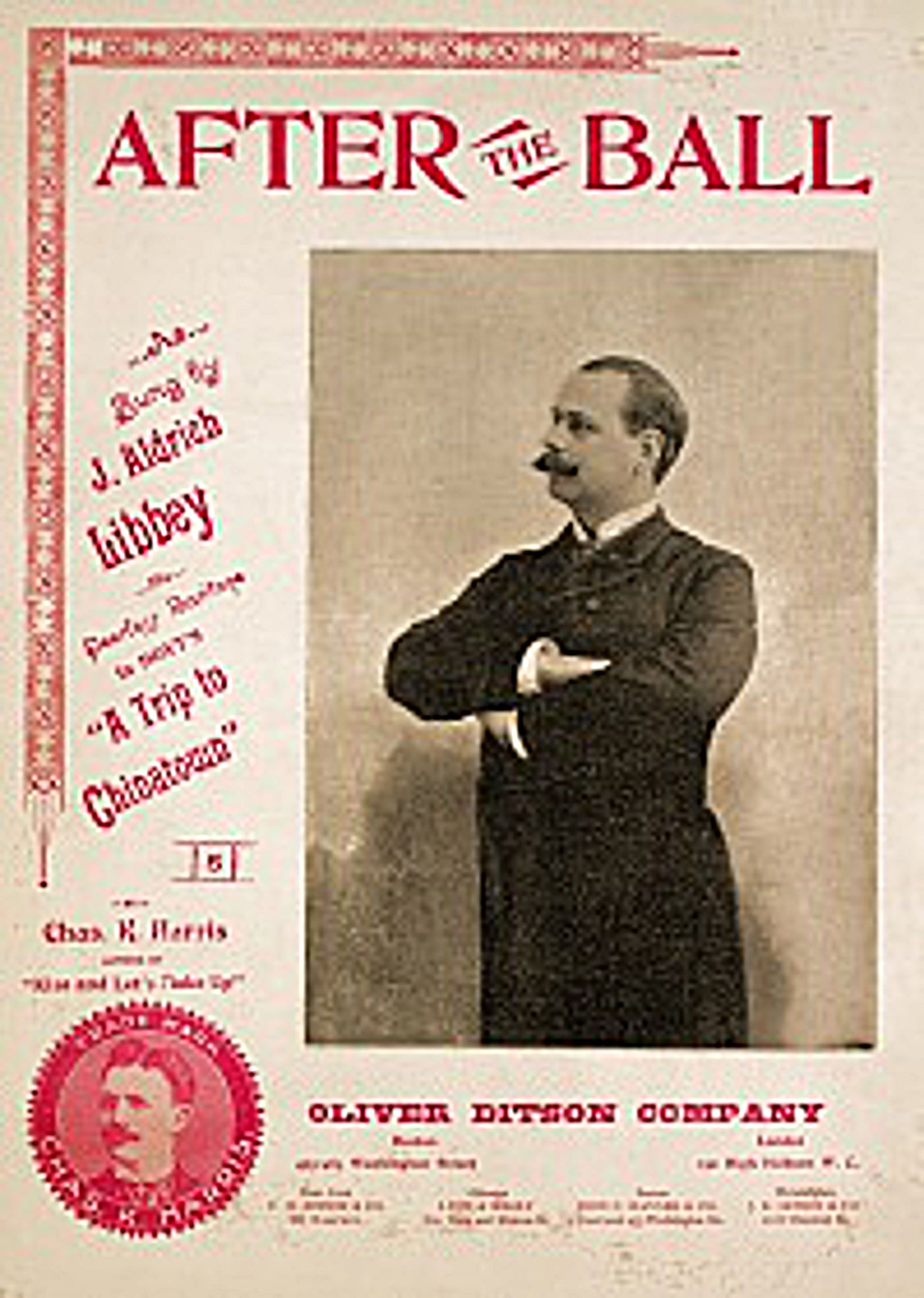
sheet music cover

Hoyt was born in 1859 in Concord, New Hampshire. In the 1870s, he became the music and drama critic for The Boston Post. Beginning in 1883, he began a career as a playwright, producing a series of twenty farcical comedies (roughly one per year until his death) and a comic opera. Hoyt had his own theater, the Madison Square Theatre, where A Trip to Chinatown premiered. It was Hoyt's 10th stage work. His plays and musicals emphasized individualized characters drawn from the everyday experiences of ordinary people. Most of his plays were non-musical farces. Two of the songs from A Trip to Chinatown are still known, "The Bowery" and "Reuben and Cynthia". There were many interpolations of songs into A Trip to Chinatown written for the many touring companies, the most famous being Charles K. Harris's "After the Ball", which was not part of the 1891 Broadway production but became a big hit and was later interpolated into Show Boat to exemplify the 1890s style. Versions of the script can be found in the 1941 Princeton University Press collection, Five Plays by Charles Hoyt edited by Douglas L. Hunt. In addition the George Washington University has microfiche copies of three versions of Hoyt's script, which changed as the cast changed, and differed from tour to tour.

The source material for the musical was the 1835 English one-act farce, A Day Well Spent, by John Oxenford. In 1842 A Day Well Spent was extended into a full-length play titled He'll Have Himself a Good Time by Johann Nestroy. In 1938, Thornton Wilder adapted Nestroy's play into the comedy The Merchant of Yonkers, which was further expanded in 1955 into The Matchmaker, which in turn was adapted into the musical Hello, Dolly! (1964).

== Synopsis ==
Two young men in San Francisco tell their wealthy but strict guardian, Uncle Ben, that they are going on an educational sightseeing trip to Chinatown. They really plan a double date night out on the town, with dinner and dancing. The men have engaged a chaperone, Mrs. Guyer, but her letter of acceptance is received by Uncle Ben, who misinterprets it as an invitation to a rendezvous. At "The Riche", the restaurant mentioned in the letter, where the young people have booked a table, the old man gets drunk. He does not see the young couples or Mrs. Guyer, and when he gets everyone's bill, it turns out that he has forgotten his wallet, which leads to humorous complications. Ben is unable to scold the young people for deceiving him, as they point out that they know about his own night out.

== Roles and original Broadway cast ==
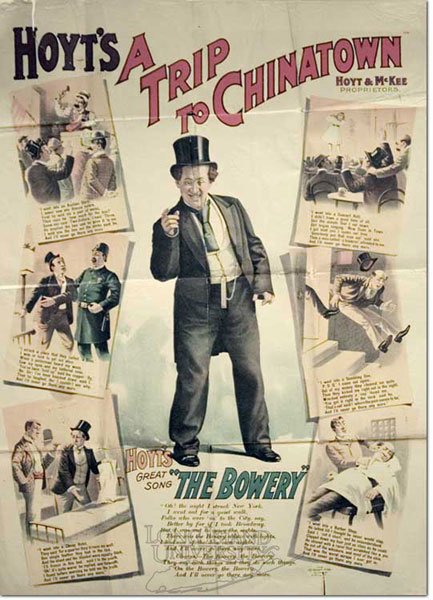
A poster with lyrics to "The Bowery", 1890

- Welland Strong (a man with one foot in the grave) – Harry Conor
- Ben Gay (a wealthy bachelor) – George A. Beane, Jr.
- Tony Gay (his ward) – Avery Strakosch
- Rashleigh Gay (his nephew) – Lloyd Wilson
- Norman Blood (chum of Rashleigh) – Arthur Pacie
- Willie Grow (a gilded youth; a trouser role) – Blanche Arkwright (later Queenie Vassar)
- Noah Heap (waiter) – Harry Gilfoil
- Slavin Payne (Ben's servant) – Harry Gilfoil
- Turner Swift (runs the ice crusher) – W. S. Lewis
- Isabel Dame (friend of the Gays) – Geraldine McCann
- Hoffman Price (manager of Cliff House) – Frank E. Morsk
- Mrs. Guyer (a widow) – Anna Boyd
- Flirt (Mrs. Guyer's maid) – Patrice
- Dancers

== Musical numbers ==
- The Bowery
- Reuben and Cynthia
- The Widow
- Push Dem Clouds Away (an African cantata)
- The Chaperone
- Out for a Racket
- After the Ball
- The Sunshine of Paradise Alley
- Love Me Little, Love Me Long
- Do, Do, My Huckleberry, Do
- Keep A-Knockin’
- Riding on the Golden Bike
- Her Eyes Don't Shine like Diamonds
- Only One Girl in the World for Me
- Then Say Good Bye!
- She's My Best Girl
- Back among the Old Folks Once Again
- McGee's Back Yard

== 1912 revision ==
In 1912, a revised version of the musical was produced by Florenz Ziegfeld, Jr., with a score by Raymond Hubbell, called A Winsome Widow.

== 1926 film ==
A silent film adaptation of the musical was released in 1926, called A Trip to Chinatown, starring Margaret Livingston and featuring Anna May Wong and Charles Farrell. The screenplay was by Beatrice Van, based on Hoyt's book, and the film was directed by Robert P. Kerr.

== Notes ==
Preceded by Adonis	Longest-running Broadway show 1893–1920	Succeeded by Lightnin'
