= A Winsome Widow =

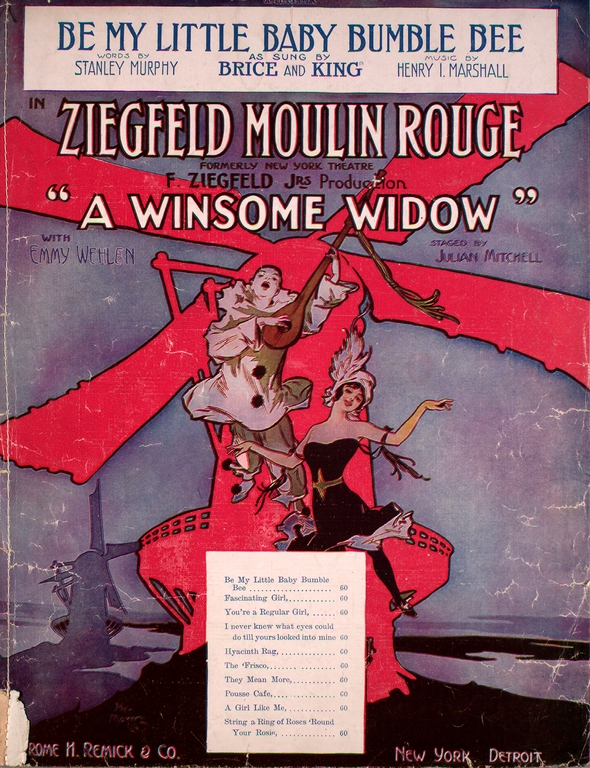
- Sheet music cover to Be My Little Baby Bumble Bee
- Music: Raymond Hubbell
- Lyrics: Unknown (pastiche)
- Book: Charles Hale Hoyt
- Basis: A Trip to Chinatown by Charles Hale Hoyt
- Premiere: April 11, 1912: Moulin Rouge
- Productions: 1912 Broadway

A Winsome Widow is a 1912 musical produced by Florenz Ziegfeld, Jr., which was a revised version of Charles Hale Hoyt's 1891 hit, A Trip to Chinatown, with a score by Raymond Hubbell.

== History ==
The show debuted at the Moulin Rouge on April 11, 1912, and ran into September, with a total of 172 performances. (A pre-opening performance was presented at Parson's Theatre in Hartford, Connecticut on April 8, 1912.) The production's sets were designed by Ernest Albert.

One of its featured songs was "Be My Little Baby Bumble Bee" by Stanley Murphy and Henry I. Marshall. The musical was a big hit, and featured a finale with real ice skating.

The large cast featured Emmy Wehlen, Leon Errol, the Dolly Sisters, Elizabeth Brice, Frank Tinney, and Charles King. A young Mae West played a small role, though she quit after five performances.

Though well received by audiences, the show had mixed reviews. The New York Clipper called it "a spectacle of gayety and gorgeousness", but The New York Times was bored of its "sameness", and critic Sime Silverman of Variety said it was "at least forty minutes too long, draggy with superfluous people."

== Primary cast (may be incomplete) ==
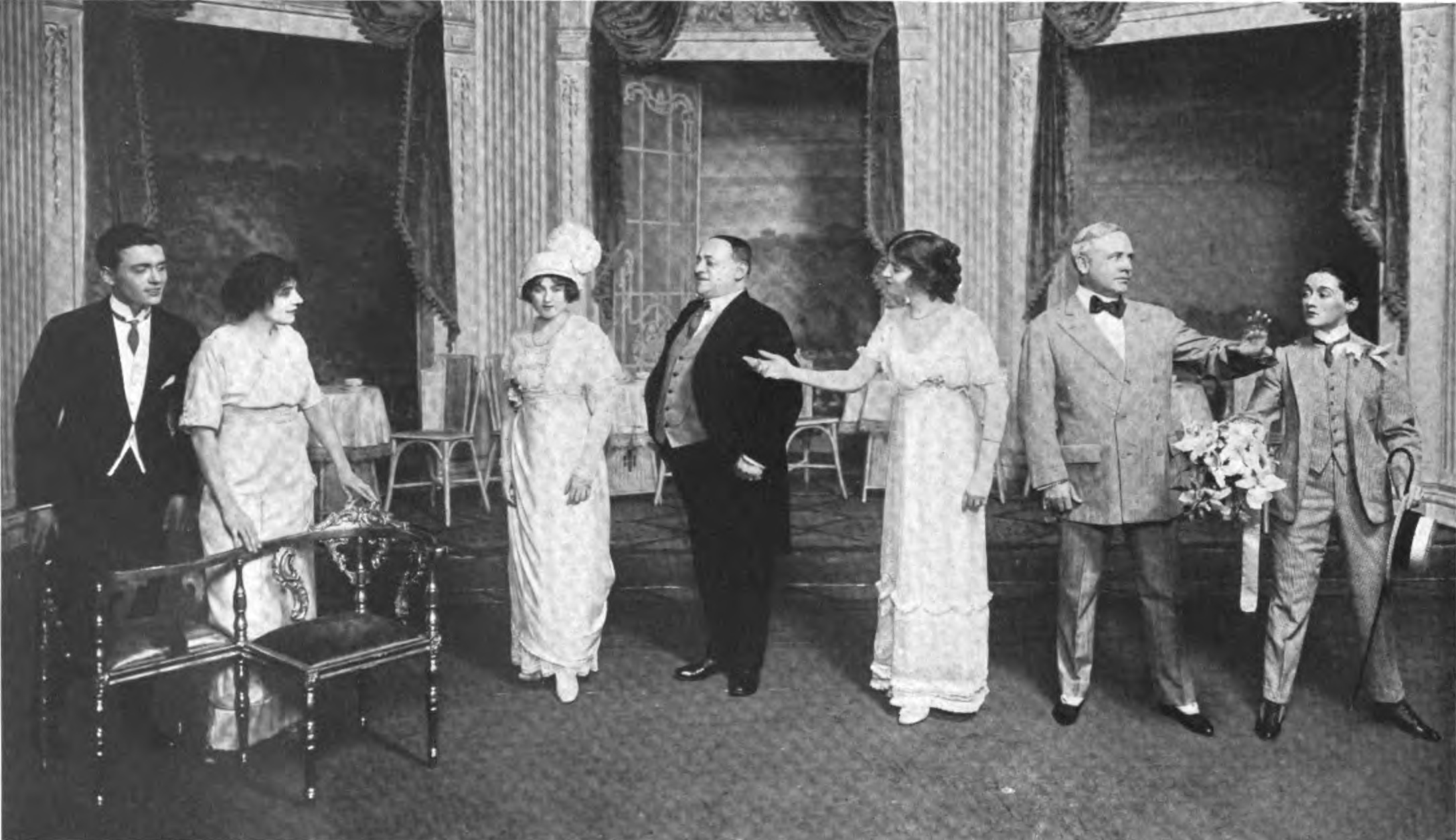
A scene from A Winsome Widow featuring Charles King, Elizabeth Brice , Emmy Wehlen, Harry Conor, Ida Adams, Charles J. Ross, and Kathleen Clifford

- Emmy Wehlen - Mrs. Guyer (the "winsome widow" of the title)
- Leon Errol - Ben Gay
- Dolly Sisters - Jenny and Rosie
- Elizabeth Brice - Isabel
- Frank Tinney - Noah
- Kathleen Clifford
- Charles King - Wilder Daly
- Harry Conor - Welland Strong (the role he also played in A Trip to Chinatown)
- Mae West - Le Petite Daffy
