= Elizabeth Brice (performer) =

American singer (1883 - 1965)

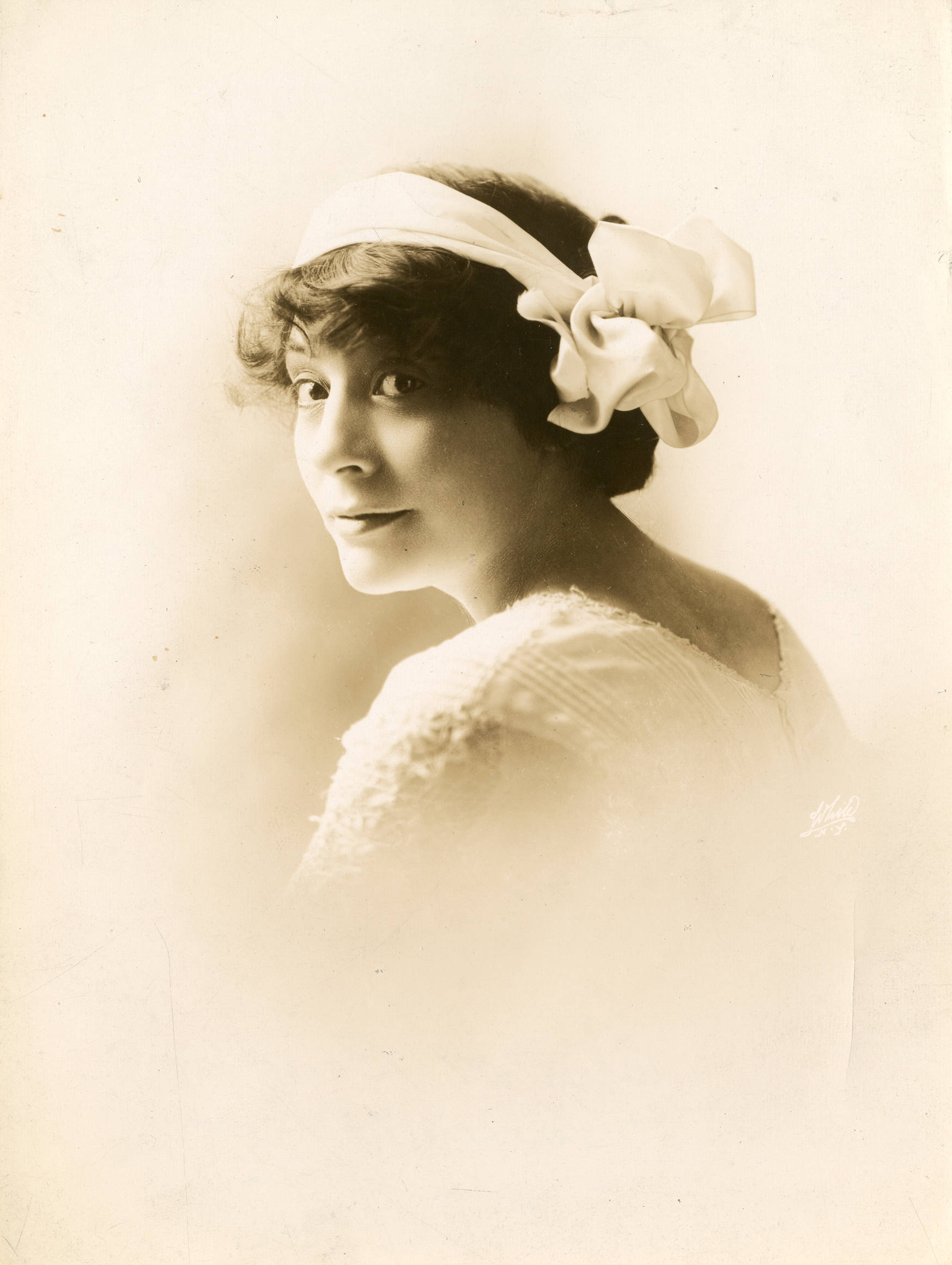
Elizabeth Brice, c. 1914

Elizabeth Brice (born Bessie S. Shaler; February 21, 1883 – January 25, 1965) was an American actress, singer, and dancer who performed in musicals and light operas. She began her career as a chorus girl on Broadway from 1902-1904, and advanced to leading roles in 1905 when she was given the title role in the touring production of Alfred Baldwin Sloane's comic opera Lady Teazle. She was a leading musical theatre actress on Broadway from 1906-1920, and enjoyed great popularity in America during the years of World War I.

In the 1910s Brice performed frequently with actor Charles King with whom she performed in a vaudeville duo. In addition to appearing on the stage, she made several recordings with the Victor Talking Machine Company in 1911 and Columbia Record from 1913-1917. After 1920 she no longer performed on the New York stage, but remained active in vaudeville and American regional theatre into the early 1930s.

== Biography ==
Brice was born Bessie S. Shaler in Findlay, Ohio, on February 21, 1883 to John Shaler and Fannie C. Wise. In March 1901, shortly after her 18th birthday, she married Fred J. Wilkinson in Essex, Ontario, Canada. Before becoming an actress and singer she worked as a stenographer for the Toledo Bee. After seeing a musical in Toledo, she decided she wanted to pursue a career on the stage and went to New York where she began working as chorus girl in the Broadway productions of A Chinese Honeymoon (1902-1903), The Runaways (1903), and Red Feather (1904).

Brice's big break came in December 1905 at the Belasco Theatre in Pittsburgh when she was plucked from the chorus of the touring company of Alfred Baldwin Sloane's comic opera Lady Teazle to replace Grace Van Studdiford in the title role. She ended up replacing Studdiford permanently on the 1905-1906 tour due to Studdiford's reportedly bad diva behavior at the direction of the Shubert family who were producing the show.

From 1906 through 1920 Brice had a prolific career in musical theatre on the New York stage. Her first leading role on Broadway was as Babette in Gustav Kerker's The Social Whirl (1906-1907). This was followed by leading parts in the original Broadway casts of Nearly a Hero (1908. as Francine), Mlle. Mischief (1908, as Lola), The Motor Girl (1909, as Louise), and The Jolly Bachelors (1910, as Carola Gayley). In the 1910s she was frequently paired in Broadway shows opposite Charles King; starring with him in The Slim Princess (1911, as Lutie Longstreet), A Winsome Widow (1912, as Isabel), Watch Your Step (1914, as Stella Spark), and Miss 1917. She was also active with King in vaudeville; performing with him as a duo act billed as Brice and King.

Brice achieved the height of her popularity during World War I, and spent time during the war she entertaining the troops overseas. Other Broadway shows she starred in included Tantalizing Tommy (1912, as Tommy), the Ziegfeld Follies of 1913, Words and Music (1917, as Mrs. Billings F. Cooings), Toot Sweet (1919), and Buzzin' Around (1920, Betty Barrett). She was also active as a recording artist with the Victor Talking Machine Company in 1911 and Columbia Record from 1913-1917; recordings which are catalogued in the Discography of American Historical Recordings.

Some sources claim Brice retired from the stage in 1920, but newspapers report her performing in American regional theaters outside of New York City as late as 1931. She was still active as a vaudeville performer in the 1920s. In retirement she lived in Queens. She died in 1965, aged 82. She was not related to Fanny Brice.
