= Charles King (musical actor) =

American vaudeville and Broadway actor (1886–1944)

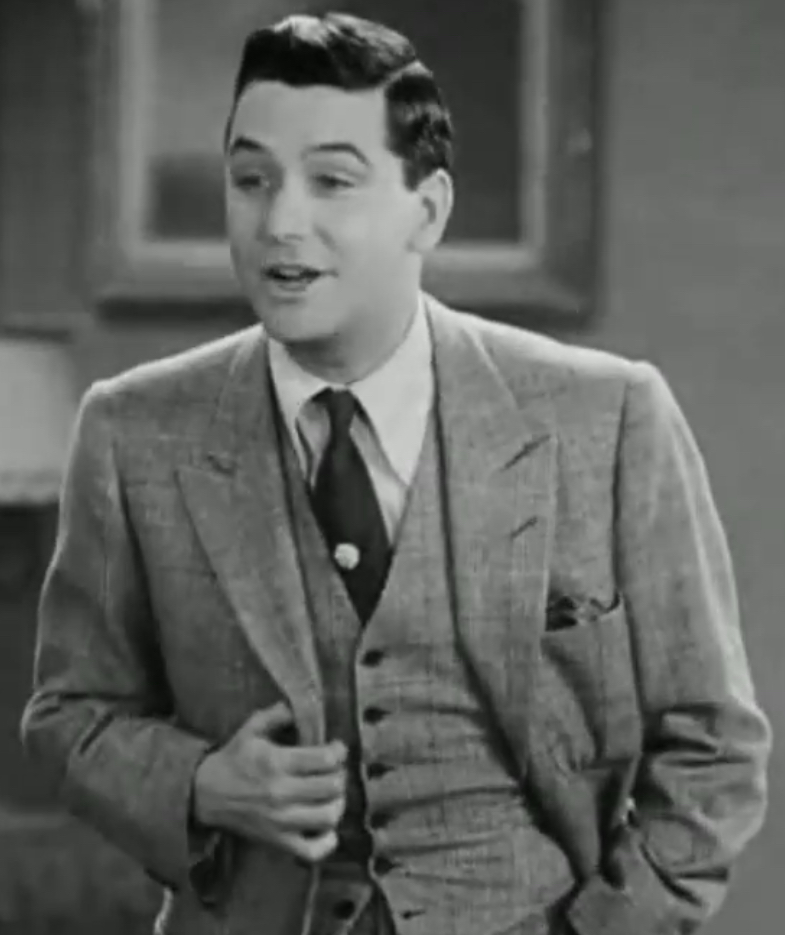
- King in The Broadway Melody (1929)
- Born: Charles Joseph King; October 31, 1886; New York City, U.S.
- Died: January 11, 1944 (aged 57); London, England, UK
- Occupation: Actor
- Years active: 1908–1944
- Spouse: Lila Rhodes

Charles Joseph King (October 31, 1886 – January 11, 1944) was an American vaudeville and Broadway actor who also starred in several movies. He starred as the leading actor in the hit MGM movie, The Broadway Melody (1929), the first all-talking film to win the Academy Award for Best Picture.

== Early life and stage experience ==
King was born in New York City on October 31, 1886 to Thomas and Ellen King, both of whom were born in Ireland and had immigrated to the U.S. in 1883. Eleven children would be born to them, but only three were living by 1900: Charles, Nellie and Mary. Under the name of Mollie King, Mary would eventually pursue a film career between 1916 and 1924.

By 1908, King had begun acting on the Broadway stage; his first known role came in the revue The Mimic World. In the 1910s his most frequent partner was Elizabeth Brice with whom he appeared in The Slim Princess, A Winsome Widow, Watch Your Step and Miss 1917. King continued to appear in many major Broadway successes during the 1920s, including George White's Scandals (1921 edition), Little Nellie Kelly, Keep Kool, Hit the Deck and Present Arms, before turning his attention to Hollywood and the nascent genre of film musicals.

== Film career ==
In late 1928, like many of his musical theatre colleagues, Charles King journeyed to Hollywood to begin appearing in films. His feature-film debut, The Broadway Melody, was an immense hit for MGM in 1929 and featured him singing the title song and "You Were Meant for Me", two significant song hits the same year. King introduced such other hits as "Orange Blossom Time" in The Hollywood Revue of 1929 (1929) and "Happy Days Are Here Again" in Chasing Rainbows (1930), but could not sustain the initial momentum of his film popularity as musicals saturated the market, many failed at the box office and studios ended their contracts with musical performers. By the end of 1930, he had returned to the Broadway stage where he spent the remainder of his career.

== Audio recordings ==
Between January 1911 and April 1930, Charles King made a series of commercial recordings for Victor, Columbia, and Brunswick including several of his stage and film hits. A total of 26 recordings were issued, 12 of them duets with Elizabeth Brice.

== Death ==
In 1944, at age 57, King died of pneumonia in London while on a USO tour.
