= Chasing Rainbows (1930 film) =

1930 film

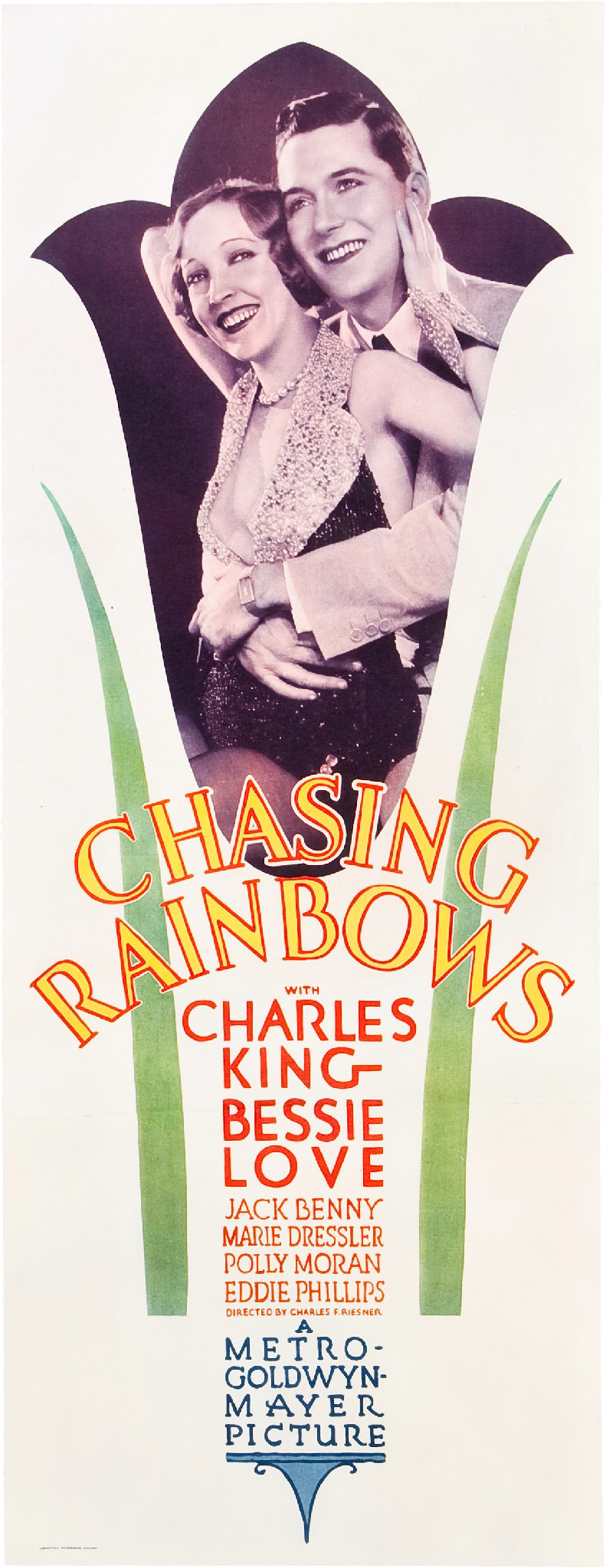
- Theatrical release poster
- Directed by: Charles Reisner
- Written by: Al Boasberg; Wells Root; Kenyon Nicholson; Charles Reisner
- Based on: Road Show by: Robert E. Hopkins; Bess Meredyth
- Starring: Bessie Love; Charles King
- Cinematography: Ira H. Morgan
- Edited by: George Hively
- Music by: Milton Ager; Jack Yellen
- Distributed by: Metro-Goldwyn-Mayer
- Release date: February 23, 1930 (U.S.)
- Running time: 106 minutes (complete but lost); 90 minutes (extant); 85 minutes (TCM print)
- Country: United States
- Language: English
- Box office: $700,000 (equivalent to $13,500,000 in 2025)

Chasing Rainbows (also known as The Road Show) is a 1930 American Pre-Code romantic musical film directed by Charles Reisner, and released by Metro-Goldwyn-Mayer.

The film reunites The Broadway Melody stars Bessie Love and Charles King, with a supporting cast of Jack Benny, Marie Dressler, and Polly Moran. This was Jack Benny's first dramatic role in a motion picture.

Filmed in July and August 1929, it was not released for months later, missing an opportunity to capitalize on the success of its song Happy Days Are Here Again, which by then had already been a major hit.

== Plot ==
Carlie and Terry are in a traveling vaudeville troupe with Eddie, the stage manager; Bonnie, a comedian; and Polly, the wardrobe mistress. Terry constantly falls in love with his leading ladies, and marries Daphne, a two-timing songstress. When he finds her with another man, Terry threatens to kill himself, but Carlie reassures him that "Happy Days Are Here Again," and the show goes on.

== Cast ==
- Bessie Love as Carlie Seymour
- Charles King as Terry Fay
- Jack Benny as Eddie Rock
- Marie Dressler as Bonnie
- Polly Moran as Polly
- George K. Arthur as Lester
- Gwen Lee as Peggy
- Nita Martan as Daphne Wayne
- Eddie Phillips as Don Cordova
- Youcca Troubetzkov as Lanning

== Reception ==
The film was commercially successful, but not as much as expected.

Love, Dressler, and Benny all received positive reviews for their performances.

== Preservation ==
Chasing Rainbows was mostly filmed in black and white, but had two sequences shot in Technicolor. The film survives, but the color scenes are lost, having been removed for a re-release in 1931 and destroyed in the 1965 MGM vault fire. The audio from the missing technicolor scenes still exists on Vitaphone disks, including "Happy Days Are Here Again".

The film has been issued on DVD in the Warner Archive Collection.

== See also ==
- List of American films of 1930
- List of early color feature films
