= The Bowery (song) =

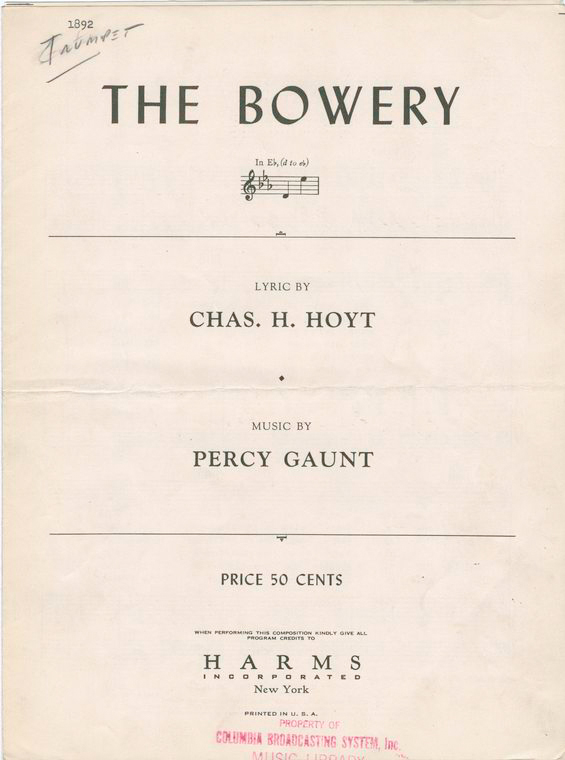
Sheet Music to The Bowery, 1892

"The Bowery" is a song from the musical A Trip to Chinatown with music by Percy Gaunt and lyrics by Charles H. Hoyt. The musical toured the country for several years and then opened on Broadway in 1891.

== Description ==
The song is written in 3/4 time in a major key. The lyrics describe an incident in New York City and have nothing to do with the plot, a story set in San Francisco. They consist of six verses interspersed with the chorus, which ends with the vow:

The Bowery, the Bowery,
I'll never go there anymore!

Although the Bowery neighbourhood of New York City was where theater life flourished from about 1860 to 1875, by the 1880s it had become a sordid district. The experience of the singer is described in part by the Village Voice:

He's [the singer] buttonholed by a grifter and conned by a shopkeeper before entering "a concert hall," where he starts a row because he thinks "A New Coon in Town" is directed at him. Bye-bye rube: "A man called a bouncer attended to me./I'll never go there any more."

== Lyrics ==
The Bowery
by Charles H. Hoyt and Percy Gaunt
From the Broadway play A Trip to Chinatown (1891)

Verse 1
Oh! the night that I struck New York,
I went out for a quiet walk;
Folks who are "on to" the city say,
Better by far that I took Broadway;
But I was out to enjoy the sights,
There was the Bow'ry ablaze with lights;
I had one of the devil's own nights!
I'll never go there anymore.

Refrain
The Bow'ry, the Bow'ry!
They say such things,
And they do strange things
On the Bow'ry! The Bow'ry!
I'll never go there anymore!

Verse 2
I had walk'd but a block or two,
When up came a fellow, and me he knew;
Then a policeman came walking by,
Chased him away, and I asked him why.
"Wasn't he pulling your leg?," said he.
Said I, "He never laid hands on me!"
"Get off the Bow'ry, you Yap!," said he.
I'll never go there anymore.

(Repeat Refrain)

Verse 3
I went into an auction store,
I never saw any thieves before;
First he sold me a pair of socks,
Then said he, "How much for the box?"
Someone said "Two dollars!" I said "Three!"
He emptied the box and gave it to me.
"I sold you the box not the sox," said he,
I'll never go there any more.

(Repeat Refrain)

Verse 4
I went into a concert hall,
I didn't have a good time at all;
Just the minutes that I sat down
Girls began singing, "New Coon in Town,"
I got up mad and spoke out free,
"Somebody put that man out," said she;
A man called a bouncer attended to me,
I'll never go there anymore.

(Repeat Refrain)

Verse 5
I went into a barbershop,
He talk'd till I thought that he'd never stop;
I: "Cut it short," he misunderstood,
Clipp'd down my hair just as close as he could.
He shaved with a razor that scratched like a pin,
Took off my whiskers and most of my chin;
That was the worst scrape I'd ever been in.
I'll never go there anymore.

(Repeat Refrain)

Verse 6
I struck a place that they called a "dive,"
I was in luck to get out alive;
When the policeman heard of my woes,
Saw my black eye and my batter'd nose,
"You've been held up!" said the copper fly.
"No, sir! But I've been knock'd down," said I;
Then he laugh'd, tho' I could not see why!
I'll never go there anymore!

(Repeat Refrain)

== History ==
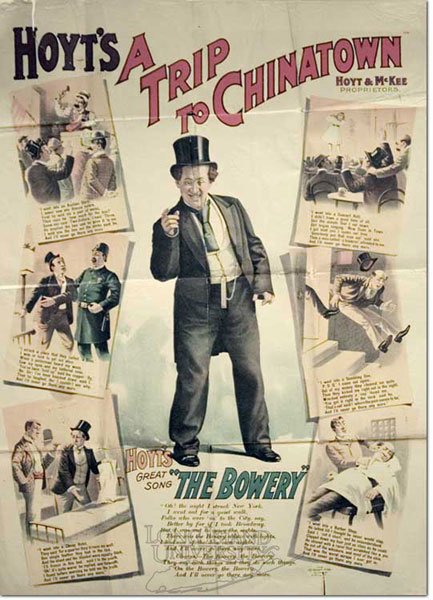
A poster with lyrics to The Bowery, 1890

The producer/playwright/lyricist Charles H. Hoyt (1849–1900) collaborated on at least 11 musicals with conductor/composer Percy Gaunt (1852–1896). Hoyt, who has been called the Father of American Farce, developed a style in his musicals based upon fast action, outrageous situations, witty dialogue, dancing, acrobatics, and singing. The meager plot of A Trip to Chinatown did not remain constant during its long run but varied with changes in novelty acts, songs, characters, and lines. One constant was The Bowery, which had been interpolated initially to shore up the musical's appeal. The strategy proved successful, and The Bowery became a major factor in the show's success. It was introduced on Broadway by comic Harry Conor. A Trip to Chinatown ran for 650 performances and set a Broadway record that stood for 20 years. The Bowery sold more than 1 million copies of sheet music and has remained a familiar song.

Bing Crosby included the song in a medley on his album Join Bing and Sing Along (1959).
