= Flora Walsh =

American actress and singer (1870–1893)

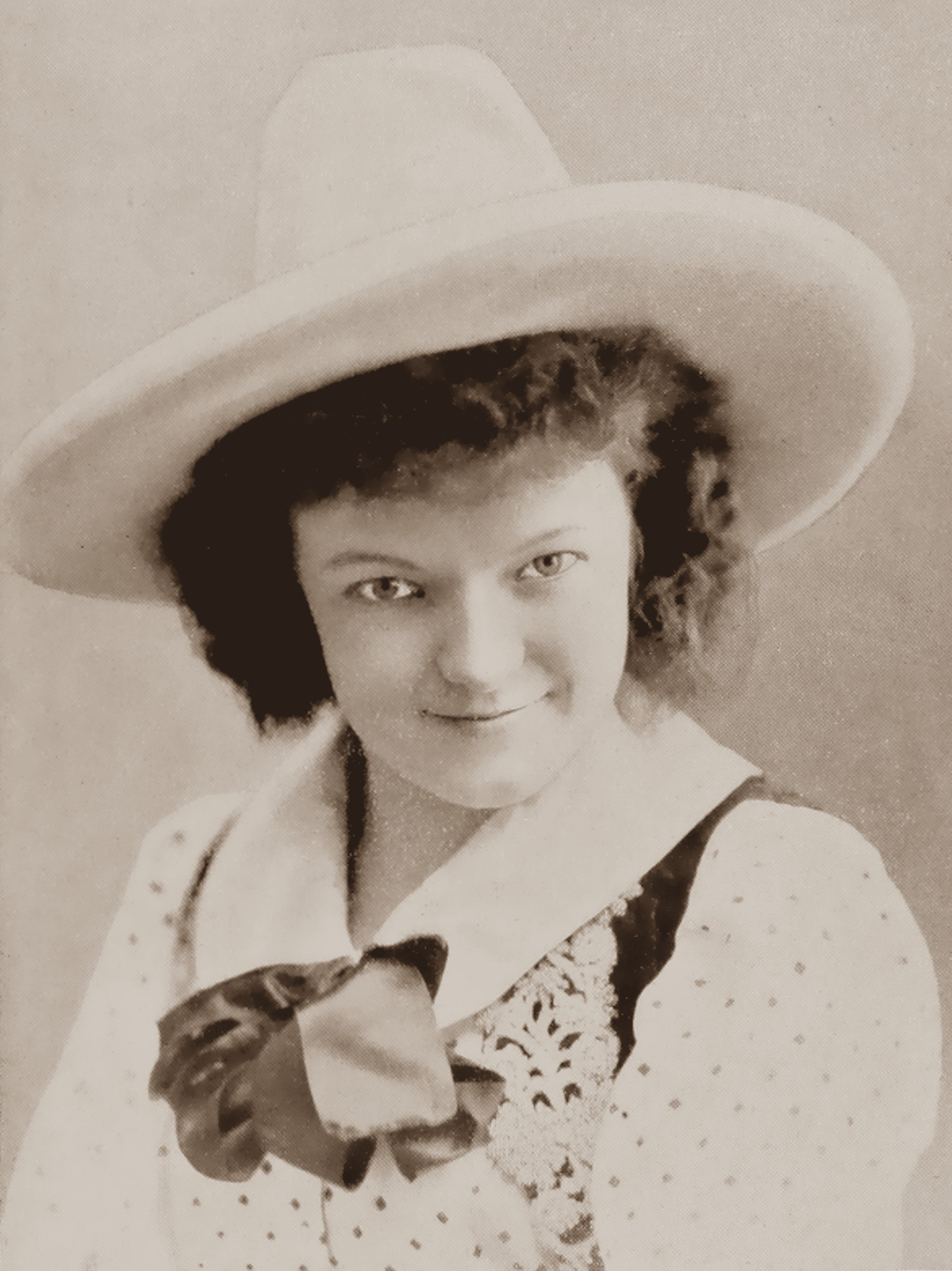
- Portrait of Walsh c. 1890s
- Born: Flora Walsh; July 25, 1870; San Francisco, California, US
- Died: January 22, 1893 (aged 22); Boston, Massachusetts, US
- Occupation: Actress
- Years active: 1879–1893
- Spouse: Charles H. Hoyt (m. 1887–1893)

Flora Walsh (July 25, 1870 – January 22, 1893) was an American stage actress in the late 19th century. Walsh performed as a child as part of a singing and dancing duo with her mother, Alice, and the two appeared in productions together until the early 1890s. Walsh's professional debut came at the age of 9 as part of a juvenile production of H.M.S. Pinafore; she soon earned opportunities to play leading roles.

In the 1880s, she performed in several works by actor-playwright Charles H. Hoyt, and the two married in 1887, when Walsh was 16 years old. She inspired some of his play writing.

Her career was cut short when she succumbed to illness at the age of 22. Her last performance was in January 1893 in Boston, Massachusetts, playing Bossy Brander in "A Texas Steer." A severe cold developed into pneumonia, leading to her death on January 22, 1893, aged 22, with her husband and mother present. Her funeral took place in the Charlestown neighborhood of Boston.

== Early life ==
Walsh was born on July 25, 1870, in San Francisco, California. Her father Edward Walsh was a civil engineer, and her mother Alice was a character actress famous on the Pacific Coast. Her father was born in Canada and her mother in England. According to the 1880 census, she was the eldest of three children and had a younger brother and sister. Her mother was believed to be worth several thousand dollars and expressed a desire to see Flora become a star.

== Career ==
Walsh was born into a theatrical family. She first performed as one of the so-called "Walsh sisters", a singing and dancing duo with her mother, Alice Walsh, a character actress known on the West coast. Her mother was considerably larger in size than Walsh, which the pair incorporated into their act. The two appeared similar in age, and it was only later known that the duo was a mother and daughter act. The two appeared in plays together until around 1891, at which point Walsh's mother joined her as a companion.

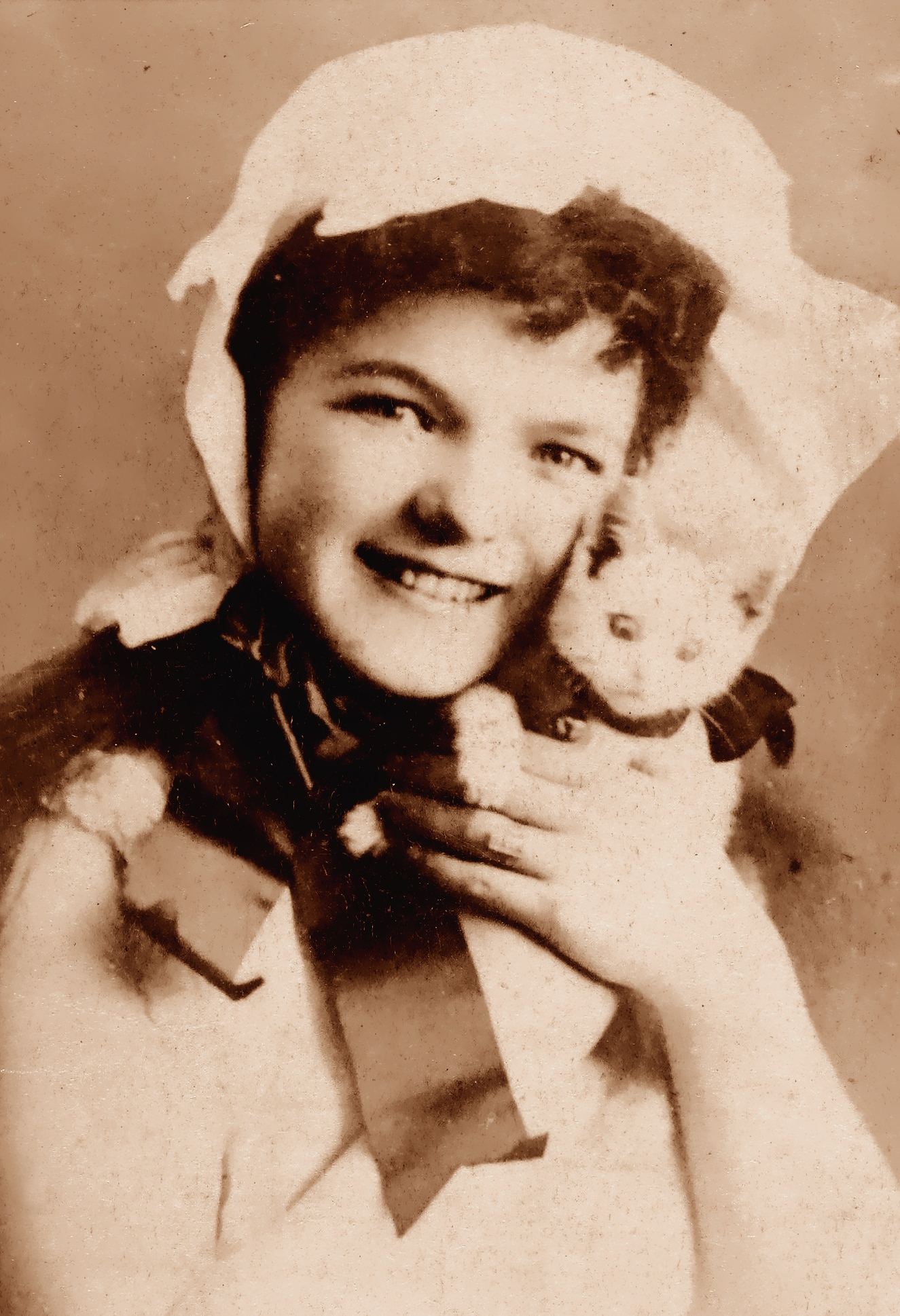
Walsh in the 1880s

Walsh made her professional debut as part of a juvenile production of "H.M.S. Pinafore" where in 1879, aged 9, she was described as being "the most extraordinary performer of her age that we have ever seen" with high praise for her acting and "sweet" soprano voice. The Sacramento Union remarked in 1880 that her portrayal in the role entitled her to be considered as the leading lady. Another early role was in "Barney's Courtship", opposite Maude Adams. A later performance as Josephine in Pinafore, at the age of 12, was at the Tivoli in San Francisco, where she earned wider recognition. Her appetite for the stage developed from an early age, and although her first part was intended only to be a minor one, her natural singing voice earned her the leading role at the age of 12. She subsequently traveled the western circuit singing opera and later featured in a production of Muldoon's Picnic. Walsh was the recipient of a benefit performance in 1882 at the Baldwin Theater in San Francisco when Dot, or the Cricket on the Hearth was presented.

By the age of 15, despite having appeared on the local stage only occasionally, Walsh was described by The Boston Globe as a natural "remarkable dancer", having never had any formal tuition; she was also described as a "chubby child". In the fall of 1885, her dramatic company was playing in towns in Colorado when they got stranded in the Rocky Mountains, 60 miles away from the nearest railroad. With little chance of leaving, they spent the winter in the mountain town of Aspen. Walsh became a popular performer there, making many friends among the local people. Amateur actors and actresses in the town would occasionally entertain in the town's only opera house, the Rink Opera House, and producers would consider the success of their performance a near certainty if they engaged Walsh. During her stay, several benefit performances were provided by the local population to show their appreciation to Walsh and her contribution to their entertainment.

Walsh was engaged to appear in a production of in Charles H. Hoyt's play Rag Baby in 1885 at Bush Street Theater in San Francisco, after one of the actresses withdrew due to illness. She appeared in other Hoyt plays later in the 1880s, including A Tin Soldier and A Parlor Match. From late 1888, she appeared as the character Baggage in another of Hoyt's plays, A Brass Monkey.

Her last theatrical appearance was on January 12, 1893, at the Tremont Theatre, where she played Bossy Brander in A Texas Steer; the role marked "the greatest hit of her life". She had been performing in this play for over a year, including at the New Park Theatre on Broadway in 1891. She had received praise from the Los Angeles Times' reviewer in 1892 for her performances in the role, with the review remarking that she was "very natural" and calling her acting "excellent".

== Death ==
During her last performance, Walsh was described as being "distressed by a severe cold" and had difficulty speaking. As her cold progressed, an abscess appeared on her neck, and she endured excruciating pain for several days. The abscess was lanced but, instead of healing, she developed pneumonia and ultimately succumbed to the disease.

Walsh died on January 22, 1893, in Boston, Massachusetts, at the Parker House following a ten-day illness. She was 22 years old. In her presence were her husband and mother. The funeral took place in the Charlestown neighborhood of Boston. Her death "cast a gloom" over her company, and her widower ceased watching the play following her death. Tim Murphy, who had performed alongside Walsh, noted she would be remembered for her manner of moving "about like a ray of sunshine, cheering everyone by the geniality of her kindly disposition".

== Personal life ==
Walsh married author and playwright Charles H. Hoyt on July 12, 1887, in Hoyt's country home in New Hampshire, two weeks before her 17th birthday. The occasion was an intimate affair of friends and close family due to the ill health of Hoyt's father. Among the guests was actor and comedian Otis Harlan. Hoyt met Walsh when she came East in A Tin Soldier and was impressed by her performances; he wrote A Hole in the Ground to provide her with better acting opportunities. While studying her acting methods he fell in love with her, and they were engaged to marry before the play was complete. They married soon afterwards, with Walsh earning an "enviable position among the leading soubrettes of the day". She was the first wearer of Hoyt's private collection of jewels, valued in 1902 at nearly $50,000 following his death.
