= 30 Below Zero =

1926 film

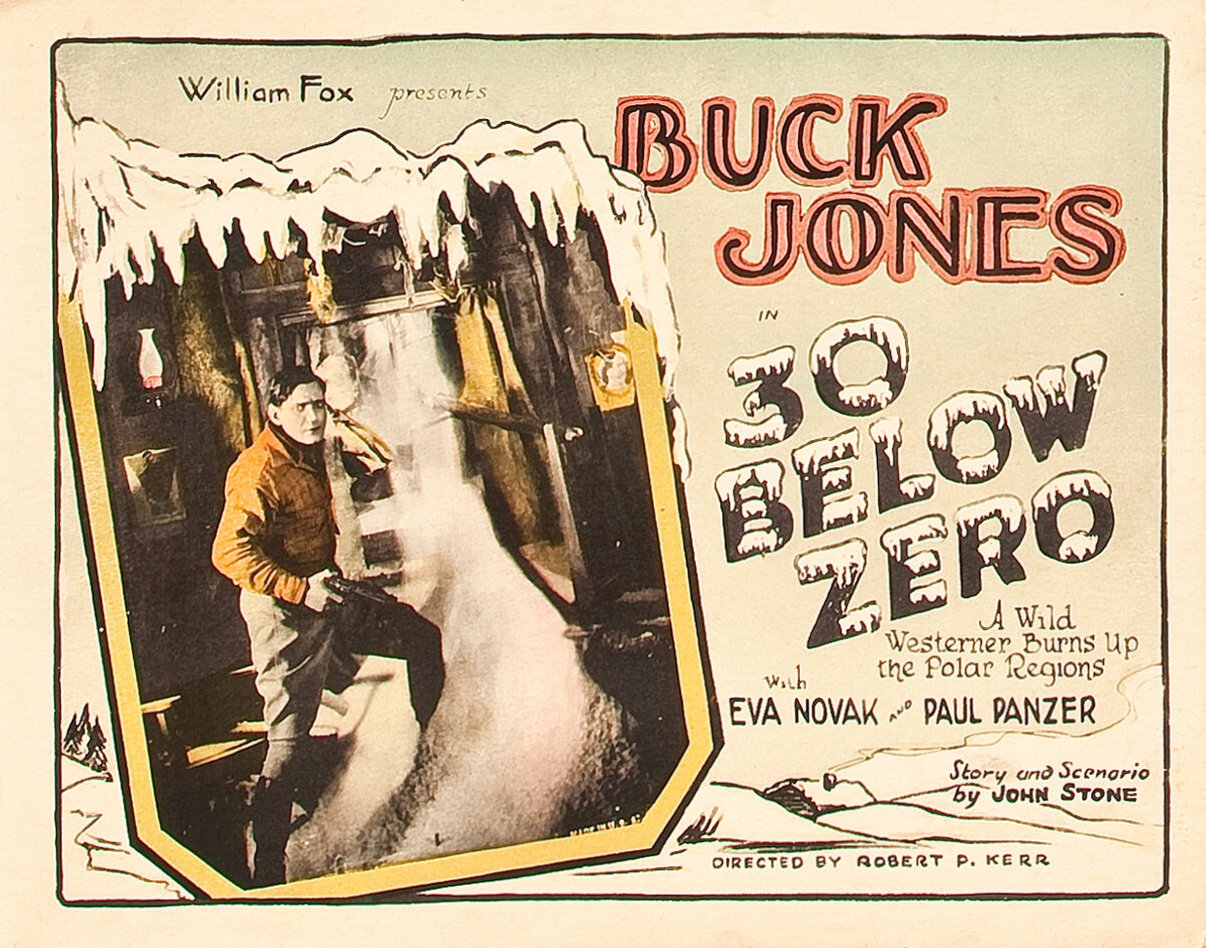
- Lobby card
- Directed by: Robert P. Kerr; Lambert Hillyer
- Screenplay by: John Stone
- Starring: Buck Jones; Eva Novak; Paul Panzer; E. J. Ratcliffe; Frank Butler; Harry Woods
- Cinematography: Reginald Lyons
- Production company: Fox Film Corporation
- Distributed by: Fox Film Corporation
- Release date: October 31, 1926
- Running time: 50 minutes
- Country: United States
- Language: English

30 Below Zero is a lost 1926 American silent drama film directed by Robert P. Kerr and Lambert Hillyer and written by John Stone. The film stars Buck Jones, Eva Novak, Paul Panzer, E. J. Ratcliffe, Frank Butler and Harry Woods. The film was released on October 31, 1926, by Fox Film Corporation.

== Cast ==
- Buck Jones as Don Hathaway Jr.
- Eva Novak as Ann Ralston
- Paul Panzer as Fighting Bill Ralston
- E. J. Ratcliffe as Don Hathaway Sr.
- Frank Butler as Professor Amos Hopkins
- Harry Woods as Cavender
- Fred Walton as Butler
- Henry Murdock as Halfbreed Indian
- Vincente Howard as Bootlegger

== Production ==
In January, 1926, it was announced that Robert P. Kerr would direct 30 Below Zero as his first film under his renewed contract with Fox. Filming began in early March, with the production taking scenes on location at Truckee, California, and wrapping up by mid-April.

== Preservation ==
With no holdings located in archives, 30 Below Zero is considered a lost film.
