= A Parlor Match =

Play by Charles Hale Hoyt

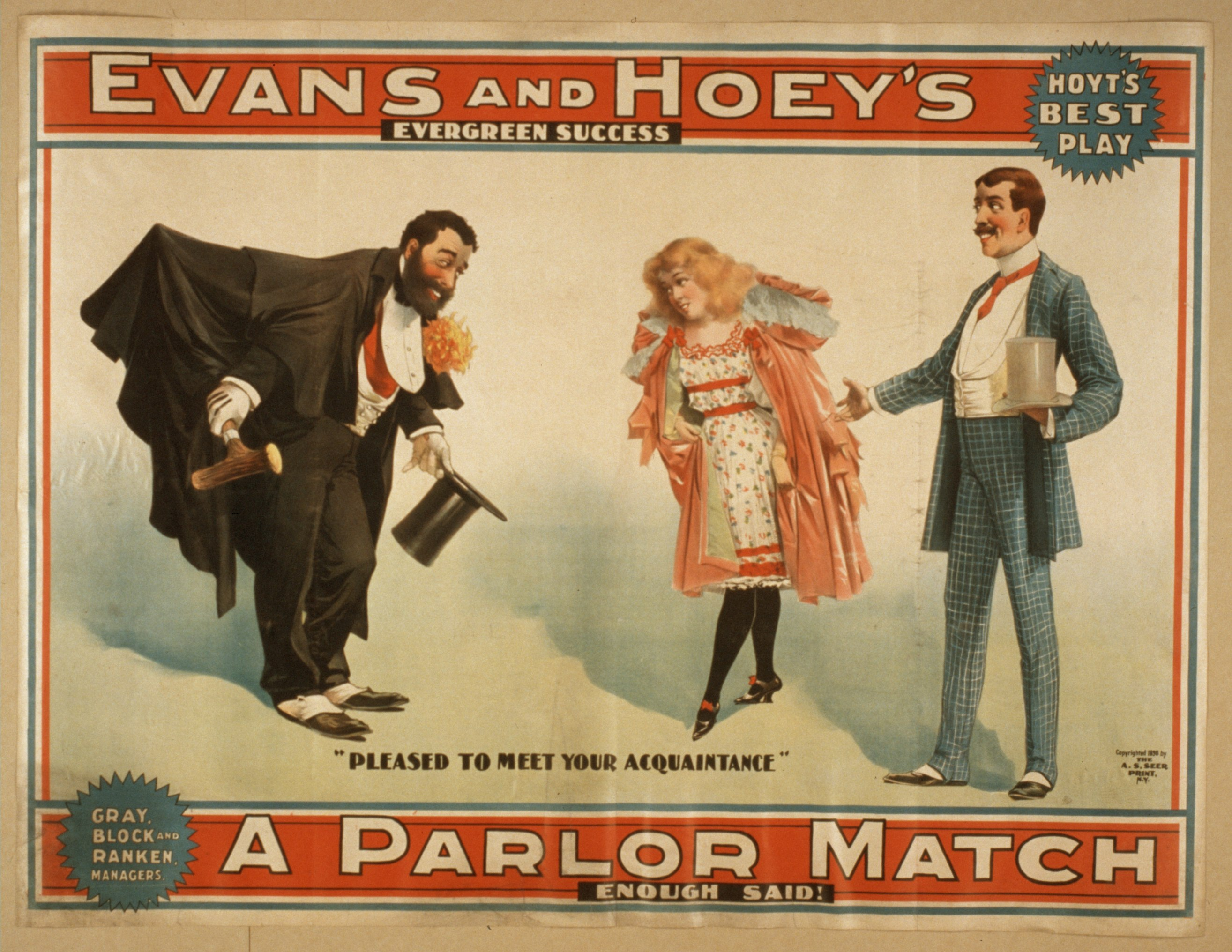
Hoey and Evans in A Parlor Match

A Parlor Match is an American musical play which debuted in 1884 and was one of the biggest hits of its time. It starred Charles E. Evans and William F. Hoey.

Charles H. Hoyt authored the play, adapting Evans' and Hoey's vaudeville piece "The Book Agent" (which came from an afterpiece by Frank Dumont) into a full-length play. The scant plot involved two hustlers who convince Captain William Kidd that he is actually a medium, serving as a vehicle for interpolated songs and dances, which would vary over time as the play traveled, and aged.

The play debuted on September 22, 1884, at Tony Pastor's Theatre, and the show played far and wide over the following years. In the 1892-93 season of its run, the English music hall song "The Man Who Broke the Bank at Monte Carlo" was added to great success.

Ziegfeld's actress Anna Held debuted in an 1896 revival at the Herald Square Theatre, which also featured Evans and Hoey returning to their original roles.
