= Caroline Miskel Hoyt =

American actress

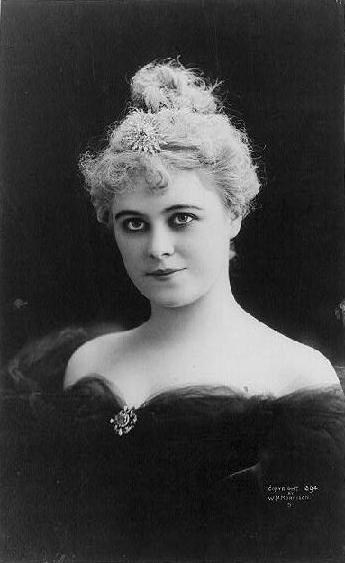
- Caroline Miskel Hoyt in 1894
- Born: Caroline Miskel Scales; September 15, 1873; Covington, Kentucky, U.S.
- Died: October 2, 1898 (aged 25); New York City, U.S.
- Occupation: Stage actress
- Spouse: Charles H. Hoyt (m. 1894)
- Writing career
- Years active: 1893–1898

Caroline Miskel Hoyt (née Scales; 1873–1898) was an American stage actress who became the second wife of playwright Charles H. Hoyt.

== Early life ==
Caroline Miskel Scales, who later adopted the professional name Caroline Miskel, was born September 15, 1873, in Covington, Kentucky. Her parents, Christopher Columbus and Mary Menzies Scales, moved to Toronto in 1875. There she became a student of the Canadian elocutionist Jessie Alexander. Over the years, Caroline's father was a merchant, Kentucky state legislator, magazine editor, and inventor.

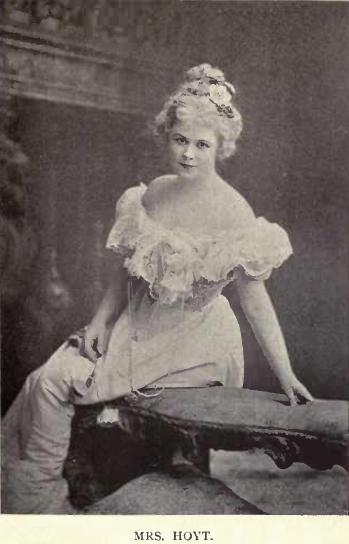
Caroline Miskel Hoyt

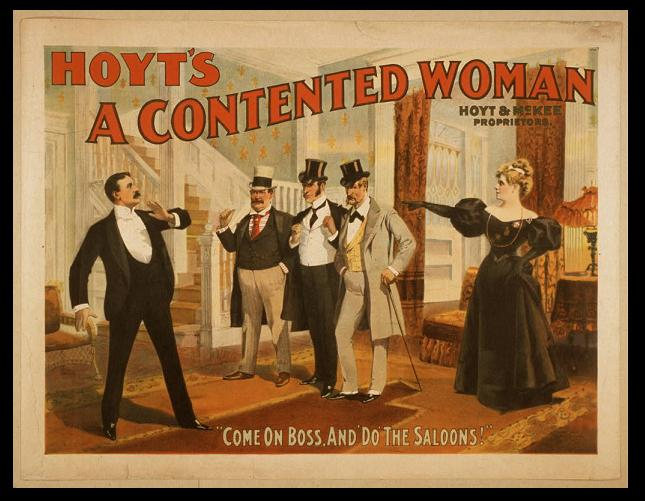
Caroline Miskel Hoyt in A Contented Woman (1897), written for her by her husband

== Career ==
Miskel moved to New York City at the age of 18 and soon made her professional stage début touring with Augustin Daly's famed repertory company that by season's end saw her playing Phoebe, the shepherdess in Shakespeare's As You Like It. She later portrayed Marguerite in Charles Osborne's The Face in the Moonlight opposite Robert B. Mantell. The following season she portrayed Ruth Hardman in Charles H. Hoyt's A Temperance Town, a satiric comedy that opened on September 17, 1893, at Hoyt's Madison Square Theatre and ran for 125 performances.

Though by then Miskel was known as a promising young actress with a flair for comedy, she chose to retire from the stage not long after she married Charles Hoyt on March 4, 1894. She returned to the theatre in January 1897 to star in Hoyt's new play A Contented Woman, the Broadway premiere of which was anticipated for the next season after a brief shakedown tour of several northeastern cities.

While in Hartford, Connecticut, early the following year, at a ceremony following the last curtain call of the opening night's performance of A Contented Woman, Caroline Miskel Hoyt received an award from the publishers of The Dramatic News. She had been voted by its readers "most popular actress" in a contest the magazine had conducted over the previous few weeks.

== Personal ==
Miskel married playwright Charles H. Hoyt on March 1, 1894.

== Death ==
On October 1, 1898, Caroline Miskel Hoyt, who had become acutely ill with kidney problems, became gravely ill following the birth of her son. Both died the next day, and mother and son were interred together at the Hoyt family plot in Charlestown, New Hampshire. Her health up until the morning of the day she died was described as "excellent" and that she had been in good spirits. The loss brought about the decline of her widower, who died in November 1900.
