= Robert P. Kerr =

American actor

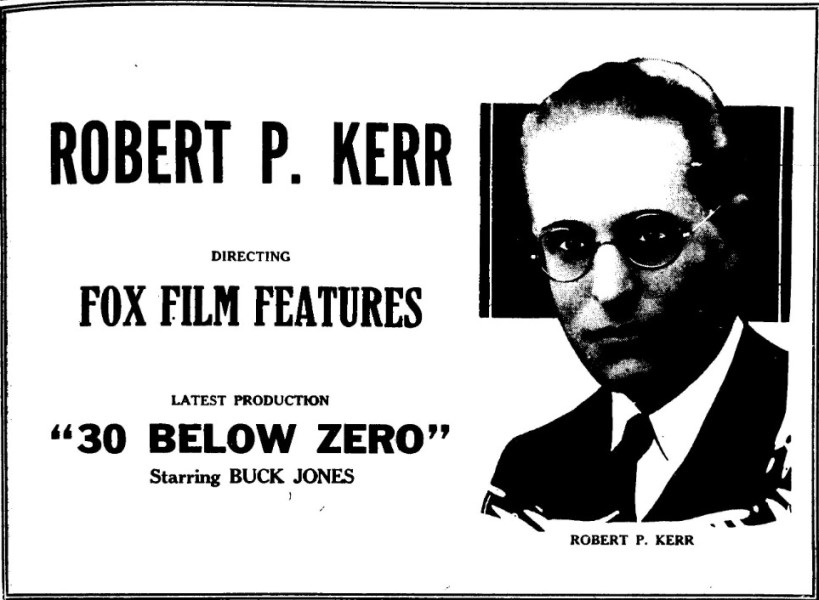
- Advertisement from 1926
- Born: October 9, 1892; Burlington, Colorado, US
- Died: September 5, 1960 (aged 67); Porterville, California, US
- Years active: 1917–1928

Robert Perry Kerr (October 9, 1892 – September 5, 1960) was an American film director, actor and screenwriter. He directed more than 40 films between 1917 and 1928. Many of his films are considered lost.

== Life ==
Kerr was born in Burlington, Connecticut on October 9, 1892, to Milton Royce Kerr and Francis Perry Kerr. His father was a Protestant minister that preached across the East Coast. His family immigrated from Scotland to New York State before moving to Connecticut.

He spent much of his early life around the Cape Cod area of Massachusetts. Fascinated by show business from an early age, Kerr would work for the circus whenever it came around town. He attended college in Carthage, Illinois. After graduation, he joined several circus troops and traveled across the United States and Canada, serving as a stand-up comedian for one of them.

He married his first wife, Elsie Helen Olchvary, on January 9, 1914. He served in World War I and was stationed in France from 1918 to 1919. He married his second wife, Katheryn S. Allison in 1922.

He moved to Porterville, California in 1942. He died at a hotel in Porterville where he was a tenent at from a heart attack. He is buried at the Home of Peace cemetery in Porterville.

== Film career ==
Kerr got his break into Hollywood with an introduction to after a friend introduced him to Mack Sennett. Kerr began his career acting as a Keystone Cop in comedy films during the early silent film era. After acting in several films, Kerr became the personal assistant of Sennett.

Kerr began his directing career working with director and producer Jack White on comedies. In his seven years of partnership with White, he co-created 33 films. He later co-directed with George Marshall after moving to Fox Films. Kerr's first feature-length film as a solo director was the comedy A Trip to Chinatown in 1926. The film is currently considered lost, as no copies of it exist in any archives. In January 1926, Kerr was signed to a three-year contract with Fox Films. The first film he produces under this new contract was 30 Below Zero.

== Filmography ==
- A Janitor's Wife's Temptation (1915) [Actor]
- Bubbles of Trouble (1916) [assistant director]
- Black Eyes and Blue (1916) [Director]
- His Bread and Butter (1916) [Actor]
- His Busted Trust (1916) [assistant director]
- A Clever Dummy (1917) [Director]
- A Royal Rogue (1917) [Director]
- Dangers of a Bride (1917) [Director]
- Hero for a Minute (1917) [Director]
- A Flyer in Folly (1918) [Director]
- Her Movie Madness (1918) [Director]
- The Pickaninny (1921) [Director]
- Stop Kidding (1921) [Director]
- Sweet By and By (1921) [Director]
- Many Happy Returns (1922) [Director]
- His First Job (1922) [Director]
- Busy Bees (1922) [Director]
- The Handy Man (1923) [Director]
- Pest of the Storm Country (1923) [Actor]
- Exit Caesar (1923) [Director]
- His Sons-in-Law (1924) [Director] [Actor] [Writer]
- Hit 'em Hard (1924) [Director] [Writer]
- Family Life (1924) [Director]
- Keep Coming (1924) [Director] [Writer]
- Keep Going (1924) [Director] [Writer]
- The Fight (1924) [Writer]
- Sons-In-Law (1924) [Director] [Writer]
- Obey the Law (1924) [Director] [Writer]
- The Big Game Hunter (1925) [Director]
- The Guest of Honor (1925) [Director]
- The Wrestler (1925) [Director]
- The Amateur Detective (1925) [Director]
- Honeymoon, Ltd. (1925) [Director]... aka "The Honeymoon Limited" - USA (alternative title)
- Control Yourself (1925) [Director]
- King Bozo (1926) [Director]
- A Trip to Chinatown (1926) [Director]
- The Complete Life (1926) [Director]
- The Feud (1926) [Director]
- 30 Below Zero (1926) [Director]
- Andy Nose His Onions (1927) [Director]
- Tie That Bull (1927) [Director]
- The Mild West (1927) [Director]
- Swiss Movements (1927) [Director]
- Society Architect (1927) [Director]
- Meet the Folks (1927) [Director]
- Ocean Blues (1927) [Director]
- Greet the Wife (1927) [Director]
- Dr. Quack (1927) [Director]
- Fighting Fannie (1928) [Director]
- They Had to See Paris (1929) [Actor]
- The Spider (1931) [Actor]
- Island of Lost Souls (1932) [Actor]
- The Public Menace (1935) [Actor]
- Party Wire (1935) [Actor]
- Life Begins at 40 (1935) [Actor]
