= Charles H. Hoyt =

American dramatist (1859–1900)

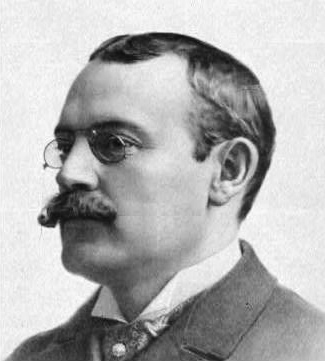
- Born: July 26, 1859; Concord, New Hampshire, U.S.
- Died: November 20, 1900 (aged 41); Charlestown, New Hampshire, U.S.
- Occupation: Dramatist
- Spouse: Flora Walsh (m. 1887; died 1893) Caroline Miskel Hoyt (m. 1894; died 1898)
- Writing career
- Years active: 1893–1898

Charles Hale Hoyt (July 26, 1859 – November 20, 1900) was an American dramatist and playwright. He was married twice, to stage actresses Flora Walsh and Caroline Miskel Hoyt, both of whom died young. The shock of the death of his second wife contributed towards his mental health issues and the alcohol consumption which culminated in his death.

== Early life ==
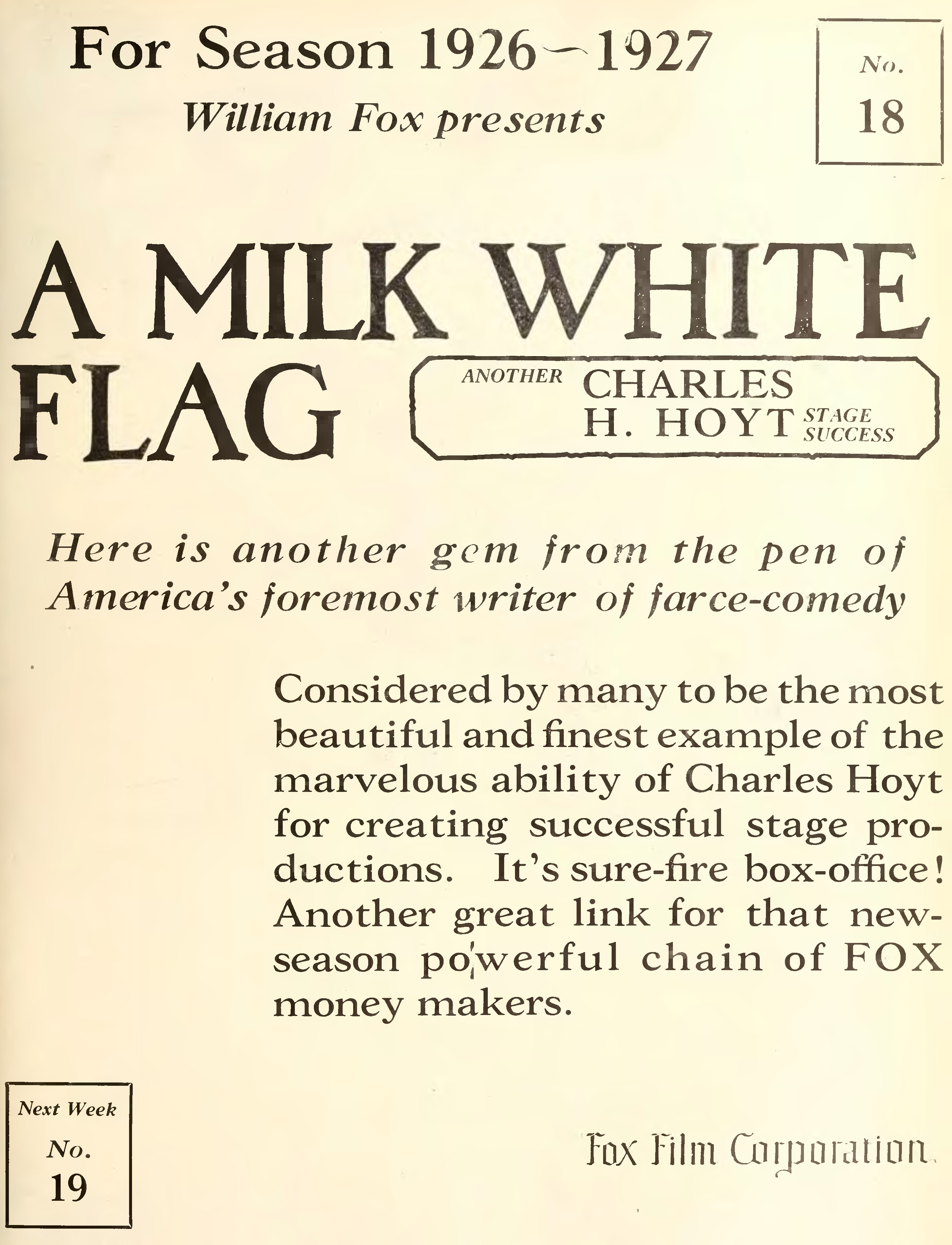
A Milk White Flag ad in Motion Picture News (1926)

Hoyt was born in Concord, New Hampshire. He had a difficult childhood, as his mother died when he was ten years old. He graduated at the Boston Latin School and, after being engaged in the cattle business in Colorado for a time, took up newspaper work, first with the Advertiser in Saint Albans, Vermont, and later becoming the music and drama critic for The Boston Post.

== Career ==
Beginning in 1883, Hoyt turned playwright and wrote a series of 20 farcical comedies (roughly one per year until his death) and a comic opera. Hoyt's plays emphasized individualized characters drawn from the everyday experiences of ordinary people. His 10th play, A Trip to Chinatown (1891), with its hit tune "The Bowery" and its then-record 657-performance run, and his 1883 play, A Milk-White Flag, were the most successful. Both were performed at Hoyt's Madison Square Theatre in New York, often called simply "Hoyt's Theatre" during the seven years he ran it. He was a highly popular playwright and producer, and was very financially successful, thanks in part to the assistance of his business partners, Charles W. Thomas and Frank McKee. A Parlor Match (1884), adapted from a vaudeville act, was another popular Hoyt play.

Hoyt was the 19th-century playwright who did the most to combine baseball with his love for the theatre. Besides having covered Boston Beaneater baseball for The Boston Post, he was a member of the Boston Elks lodge, whose members included fellow theatre and sports buff Nat Goodwin. In early 1888, Hoyt was responsible for the stage debut of Boston Elk-Boston Beaneater Mike "King" Kelly in his A Rag Baby, and for the first-ever star billing given to a ballplayer on the stage. The latter took place in 1895, with longtime Chicago diamond star Cap Anson drawing the distinction through his A Runaway Colt.

Hoyt was also responsible for two of Kelly and Anson's lesser roles: At the end of the 1888 season, he gave Anson a bit part one day in the role of Monk in one of his new pieces; Anson wore "old gray whiskers and an old man’s wig" and stalked forth and shouted, "Good marnin, me min; I want yez to git that hole complaited [completed] to-day." Those were all of his lines, and New York and Chicago players were present. Around Christmas that year, and then New Year’s Day of 1889 in New York, Kelly played a "tough baggage-smasher" in Hoyt’s A Tin Soldier. Kelly was dressed as a tramp, and some of his lines concerned a character named Rats. When someone said to him, "Do have that Rats licked. I’ll give $10 to have that Rats licked," Kelly replied, "Make it $15 and I’ll lick him." Later, when someone said, "Do it well and I’ll make it [$]25," Kelly replied, "Young feller, I’ll blot him off the earth."

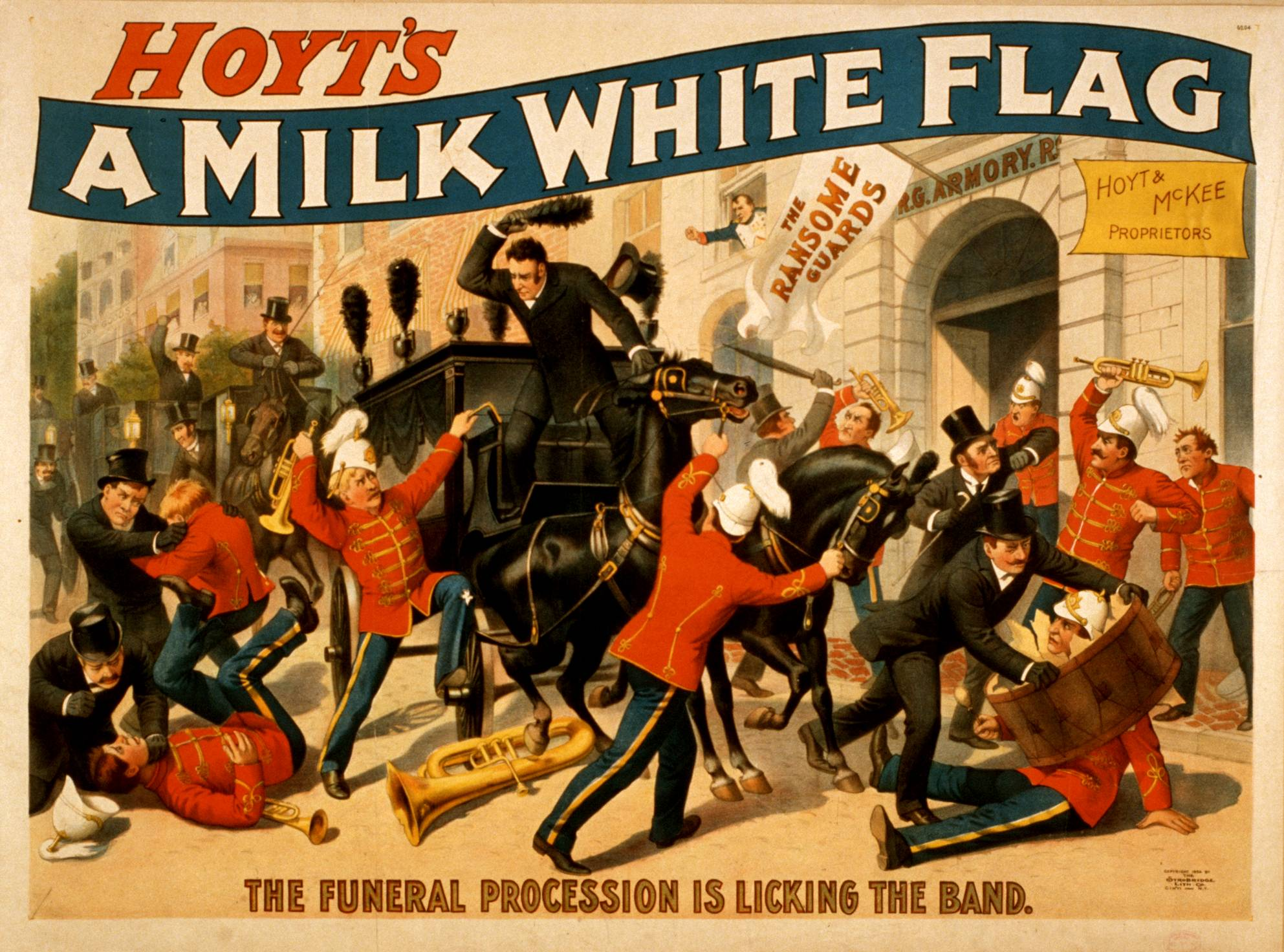
Poster for A Milk White Flag (1894)

Hoyt, once considered one of the most famous citizens of Charlestown, New Hampshire, was twice a member of the New Hampshire Legislature and was Democratic candidate for Speaker.

== Personal life ==
Hoyt's first marriage was to stage actress Flora Walsh on July 12, 1887, in Hoyt's country home. The occasion was an intimate affair of friends and close family due to the ill health of Hoyt's father. Among the guests was actor and comedian Otis Harlan. Hoyt had first met Walsh in 1885 when she was engaged to appear in a production of Rag Baby, starring Hoyt, at Bush Street Theater in San Francisco, after one of the young actresses on the opening night withdrew due to illness. Hoyt was impressed by Walsh's performances, and while studying her acting methods in order to write a role for her in his play A Tin Soldier (1887), he fell in love with her; they were engaged before the play was complete and married soon afterwards, with Walsh earning an "enviable position among the leading soubrettes of the day". After experiencing what was first thought to be a severe cold, Walsh became severely ill and died at the age of 22 on January 22, 1893 in Boston, Massachusetts from pneumonia following a ten day illness, with Hoyt in her presence.

Following the death of Walsh, Hoyt was described as being inconsolable until meeting Caroline Miskel Hoyt "and life awoke for him". Following their marriage, they were a happy couple and celebrated the birth of a child, although it only lived for a short time. Miskel, who was not considered to be in particularly strong health, died in October 1898, at which point Hoyt went into a state of shock and drank excessive amounts of alcohol, "hoping to drown his sorrow". In the months following her death, Hoyt walked the streets and sat in hotel corridors, often being found asleep in public restrooms from exhaustion. He was said to have grieved "morbidly, deeply, unremittingly", sleeping very little. A year following Miskel's death, he attended the final rehearsals for what would be his last play A Dog in the Manger, which was poorly received by audiences and swiftly cancelled by his close friend and partner Frank McKee. Hoyt was committed to an insane asylum in 1900. His stay was brief, and he returned to his home in Charlestown, New Hampshire.

== Death ==
Hoyt later suffered paresis and lost his mind. In the period leading up to his death, friends tried to appoint a guardian to act in his best interests if he were unable to care for himself, which raised outcry of a conspiracy to seize his property and gain control of his assets, believed to be worth around $300,000. he died in November 20 1900.

His private collection of jewels, valued at nearly $50,000 in 1902 following his death, were first worn by his first wife Flora. His former partner Frank McKee was one of his estate's executors, and the jewels went into his possession, despite claims from the mother and sister of his second wife Miskel that he had promised them the gems.

== Plays ==
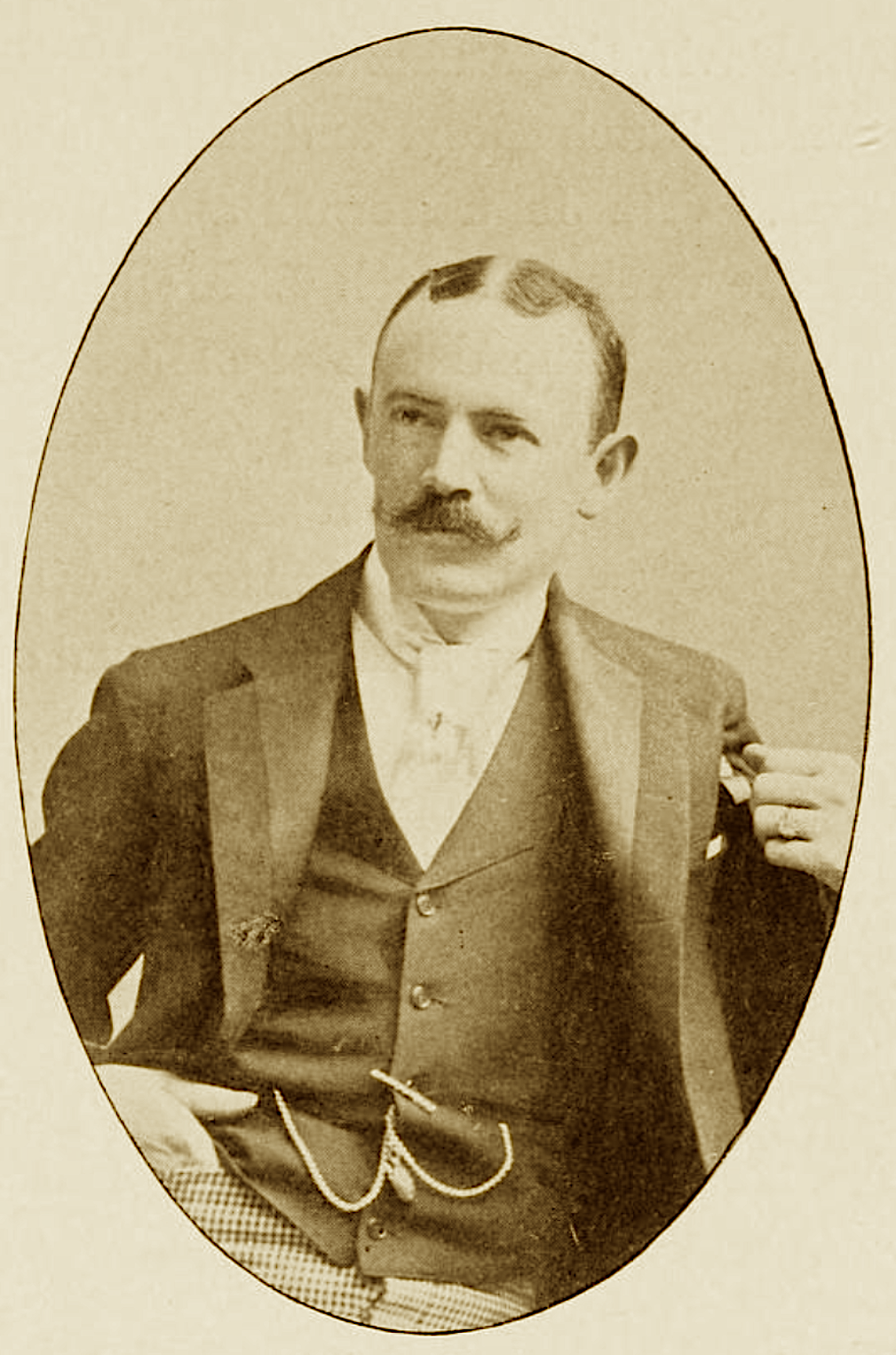
Charles H. Hoyt

New York debut year unless otherwise indicated.

- Gifford's Luck (Boston 1881)
- Cezalia (Boston 1882)
- A Bunch of Keys (1883)
- A Rag Baby (1883, Broadway 1884)
- A Parlor Match (1884)
- A Tin Soldier (1886)
- The Maid and the Moonshiner (1886)
- A Hole in the Ground (1887)
- A Brass Monkey (1888)
- A Midnight Bell (play) (1889)
- A Texas Steer (1890)
- A Trip to Chinatown (1891)
- A Temperance Town (1893)
- A Milk White Flag (1894)
- A Runaway Colt (1895)
- A Black Sheep (1896)
- A Contented Woman (1897); adapted into the musical Ladies First
- A Stranger in New York (1897)
- A Day and Night in New York (1898)
- A Dog in the Manger (Washington, D.C., 1899)

== Sources and further reading ==
- Nancy Foell Swortzell (Feb 2000). "Hoyt, Charles Hale". American National Biography Online.
- Howard W. Rosenberg, Cap Anson 2: The Theatrical and Kingly Mike Kelly: U.S. Team Sport's First Media Sensation and Baseball's Original Casey at the Bat (Arlington, Virginia: Tile Books, 2004). Rosenberg subsequently re-read one of his sources, the Chicago Daily News of October 6, 1888, and discovered that Anson's bit part in 1888 was not in Hoyt's A Bunch of Keys, as appears in his book, but in the role of Monk in what the Daily News merely described as one of Hoyt's "new pieces."
