= The Belle of New York =

The Belle of New York may refer to:

- The Belle of New York (musical), an 1897 Broadway musical that achieved much greater success in London
  - The Belle of New York (1919 film), an adaptation of the musical
  - The Belle of New York (1952 film), another adaptation of the musical
