= Leona Stephens =

American actress, playwright, and songwriter

Leona Stephens (c. 1884 – July 22, 1982, Bogota, New Jersey), also known as Leona Hollister, Leona Stephens Hollister, Leona Hollister West, and Leona Stephens Hollister West, was an American actress, vaudeville performer, playwright, and songwriter who had an active career on stage and radio during the first half of the 20th century.

== Life and career ==
Born in Ohio, Stephens was one half of the vaudeville team Stephens & Hollister; the other half being her first husband, the actor and playwright Len D. Hollister (1884-1936). The duo toured in the major vaudeville circuits during the first two decades of the 20th century, and in the 1930s and 1940s they had their own program on CBS Radio, The Hollisters.

Stephens also worked as an actress on Broadway, beginning with the role of Lottchen Spring in the Gustav Kerker and Roderic C. Penfield musical The White Hen at the Casino Theatre in 1907. Her other Broadway credits included Tillie Ticker in the musical Let George Do It (1912), Mrs. Schaeffer in the play The Come-On Man (1929), Lissa in the musical Right This Way (1938), and Greeny Gorman in the play Dark of the Moon (1945). As a playwright, only one of her plays was staged on Broadway, The Morning After (1925, Hudson Theatre). In 1912 she toured nationally in the Eddie Foy musical Over the River.

After the death of her first husband and stage partner in 1936, Stephens continued to perform through the 1940s. She was also active as a songwriter during this period, and several of her songs were published.

Leona Stephens Hollister West died on July 22, 1982, in Bogota, New Jersey at the age of 98. The Manuscripts and Archives Division of the New York Public Library holds the "Leona Stephens papers 1878-1952"; a collection of personal documents, letters, photographs, sheet music, and other artifacts which document her career.
