= Charles Cartwright =

English stage actor and manager (1851–1915)

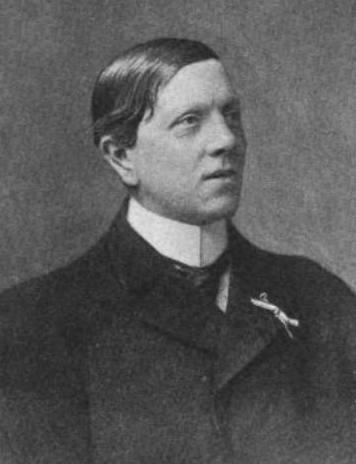
- In The Sketch, 11 December 1901
- Born: Duncan John Morley; 7 March 1851; Clerkenwell, London, England
- Died: 25 May 1915 (aged 64); Swiss Cottage, London, England
- Education: Stonyhurst College
- Occupations: Actor, manager

Duncan John Morley (7 March 1851 – 25 May 1915), known professionally as Charles Cartwright, was an English stage actor and actor manager in the Victorian era. He was best known for his portrayal of villains in the melodramas that flourished at London's Adelphi Theatre in the 19th century. He also played more sympathetic characters and, for a time, was under the management of Sir Henry Irving at the Lyceum. He toured extensively with productions around England and the provinces, as well as spending a season in India, two seasons in Australia and three in the USA.

== Early life ==
Cartwright was born on 7 March 1851 in Clerkenwell, London to George Morley, a farmer from Berkshire turned wheelwright, and Caroline (née Lane) who was of Huguenot descent from Bethnal Green, London. The family lived in Warren Street in central London.

Educated at Stonyhurst College, Lancashire, he became a government clerk in London, a position his parents had organised for him. But the lure of the stage drew him to Birmingham in 1873, where he put himself forward for a role in a burlesque performance of Don Giovanni and changed his name to Charles Cartwright to avoid being found out by his parents.

He spent the following year travelling around England in search of acting and singing engagements to develop his stage skills. In 1874, he became a stock actor at the Prince of Wales theatre in Liverpool. He appeared in burlesques and operettas until the arrival of the actress Jennie Lee heralded a move to more serious drama and an opportunity for a stand out role as Chadband in Little Jo, an adaptation of Charles Dickens' Bleak House.

== Career ==
Following Little Jo's transfer to London's Globe Theatre in 1876, Cartwright moved away from burlesque to join the company at the Theatre Royal in Manchester, taking on a number of roles in Shakespearean revivals under the management of Charles Calvert. After appearing as Osric in Henry Irving's touring production of Hamlet, Cartwright joined the company at the Lyceum on its return to London. His first role at the Lyceum was as Irving's stunt double in a production of Vanderdecken, a play by W.G. Wills and Percy Fitzgerald in which Irving's character falls off a cliff. Subsequently, Cartwright stayed at the Lyceum for two years, first under the management of Sidney Frances Bateman and then Irving. He performed in a range of classical plays but found a talent for making villains credible, such as Job Trotter in the Dickens' adaptation, Pickwick.

But in 1879, some ill-judged comments led to Cartwright leaving the Lyceum. The company was on tour, sailing from Scotland to Ireland, when Henry Irving became ill with seasickness. Cartwright quipped that Irving didn't look like the young Hamlet. When the company was back in London, Irving informed Cartwright that his role in the forthcoming Hamlet revival would be that of the servant of Polonius - a part with barely any lines.

Cartwright left Irving's company and travelled to Bombay, where he had been hired to manage the launch programme of 35 musical and theatrical productions at the city's new Gaiety Theatre, which opened on 6 December 1879.

=== 1880s ===
Arriving back in London in 1881, Cartwright joined William Creswick's company at the Surrey Theatre for a Shakespearean revival season, before joining Edwin Booth's 1882 tour in the north of England. In Liverpool, he appeared as Troy in J Commyns Carr's adaptation of Far From the Madding Crowd. The popular adaptation, in which Thomas Hardy was personally involved, premiered on 27 February 1882, before going on a provincial tour and then transferring to London.

He established himself in London and, in 1883, appeared with Kyrle Bellew and Marie Litton in a hugely successful production of Moths, an adaptation by Henry Hamilton of a novel by Ouida. He would go on to reprise his role in Moths a number of times in London, the provinces and colonies.

The success of Moths guaranteed Cartwright a steady stream of leading roles. In 1887, he joined the company at the Adelphi Theatre in London, appearing in a number of productions alongside Olga Nethersole and William Terris. He was in 102 consecutive performances of The Silver Falls, winning plaudits for his powerful and clever characterisation of the villain and appeared in long runs of melodrama such as The Bells of Haslemere, The Union Jack and Harbour Lights.

=== 1890s ===
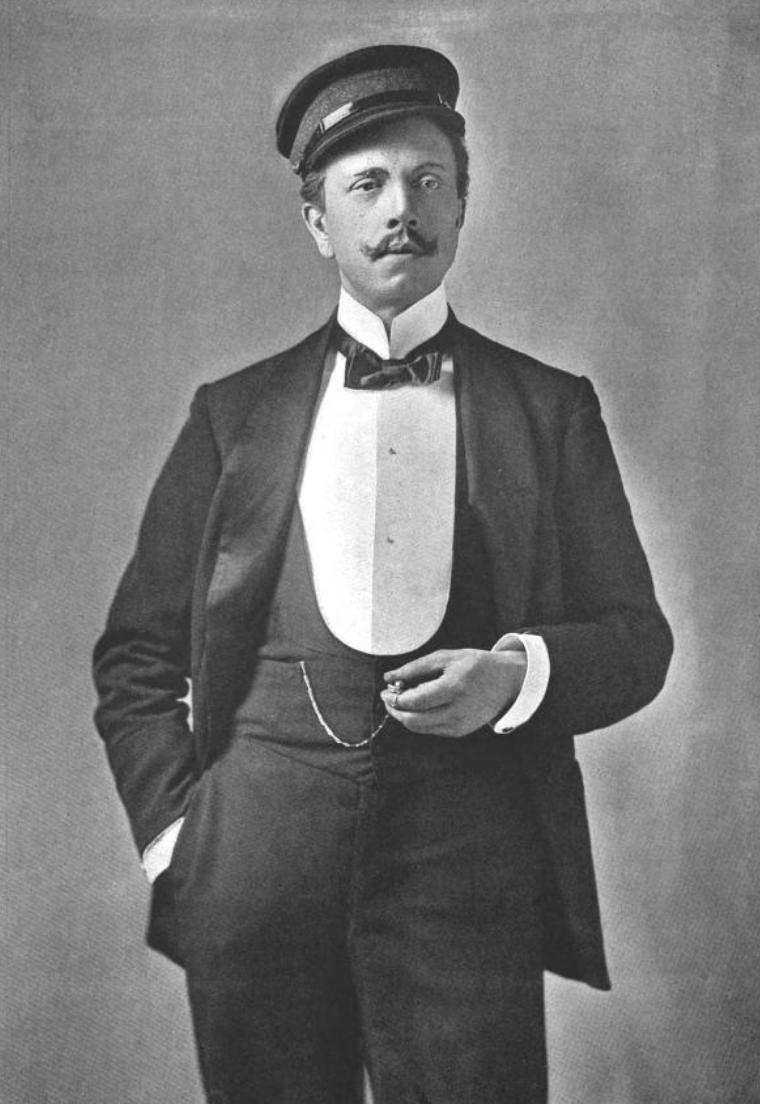
As Sir Hugh Garlinge in the 1894 play John-a-Dreams

The heavy performance and touring schedule took a toll on Cartwright's health. In October 1890, in search of a better climate, he took a company on a ten month tour of Australia, opening in Melbourne's Bijou Theatre, on contract to the Brough and Boucicault Comedy Company.

After Australia, Cartwright returned to the Adelphi, where his performances included Oliver Cromwell in The White Rose (23 April – 10 June 1892) and Jeptha Grimwade in 200 performances of William Pettit's A Woman's Revenge (1 July 1893 – 3 March 1894).

In between engagements at the Adelphi, he broke away from playing villains to portray more sympathetic characters. He became involved in producing and directing plays, looking for new works, particularly literary adaptations. In 1894, he directed The Two Orphans (12 May – 18 June 1894) at the Adelphi, with himself in the lead role and with Marion Terry playing one of the sisters. He was also in contact with authors and playwrights, among them Thomas Hardy, with whom he worked in Liverpool, and Oscar Wilde, who asked Cartwright to stage The Duchess of Padua.

In 1895, he went into business with the theatre manager Henry Dana, taking out a 21-year lease on the Trafalgar Theatre. His first move was to change the name of the theatre to the Duke of York's, after gaining the approval of the future King George V. Opening with a successful run of Walter Frith's Her Advocate, he eventually sub-let the theatre to the team behind The Gay Parissienne, which ran for 369 performances.

In early 1899, Cartwright sailed to Australia for a second tour at the invitation of Harry Rickards, with a repertory of seven plays for which he had secured the Australian rights. Cartwright had assembled a company from London, this time with Beatrice Lamb as his leading lady. At a farewell dinner before his departure, Charles Wyndham and Max Beerbohm Tree delivered speeches rebuffing Clement Scott's incendiary views on acting which he had published in January 1898 as "Does the theatre make for good?" News of the farewell party and its speeches was extensively covered in the media of the day.

The tour took in Adelaide, Melbourne, Sydney and Perth, before sailing back to England in October 1898.

=== 1900s ===
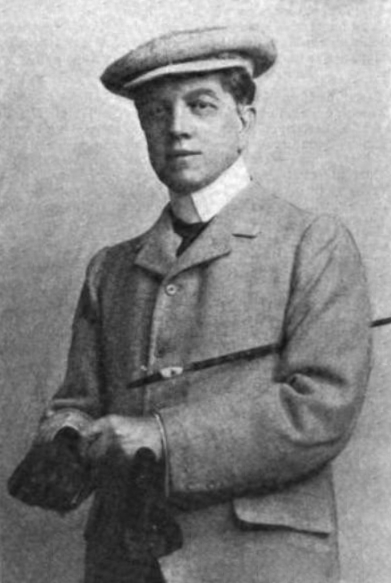
As Max in The Mouse, 1902

Cartwright began to concentrate once again on producing and directing plays. Setting up the London Matinee Syndicate Ltd., he solicited investment in theatrical productions with the promise of 10% returns. Investors in this scheme would have seen dividends from Cartwright's staging of English Nell at the Prince of Wales, with Marie Tempest in the title role. It ran for 176 performances, one of which was captured as an early film.

Buoyed by these successes, Cartwright travelled to America for the 1904–05 season, having assembled a group of actors including his brother-in-law Edmund Lyons for a run of Zwangwill's Leah Kleschna at the Manhattan Theatre. With Minnie Fisk in the lead role and Cartwright playing the manipulative Kleshna, the play was a critical and commercial success, running for 131 performances. Less popular was Cartwright's attempt at writing. The production of The Proud Laird, a play he had co-written with Cosmo Hamilton, closed after being described by The New York Times as "muckle ado aboot naething". Other successful plays in the tour were Zwangwill's Merely Mary Ann and Nurse Marjorie.

He returned to Broadway for the 1906-7 season and in 1910-11 toured California in David Belasco's production of The Lily, taking in the Clunie Theatre in Sacramento and the Mason Theatre in Los Angeles, before arriving back in England towards the end of 1911.

== Death ==
On 3 April 1912, while performing in Chester Bailey Fernald's play 98.9, Cartwright suffered a stroke which forced him into retirement.

He died of acute bronchitis and syncope at his home in Swiss Cottage on 25 May 1915, survived by his wife Eva and their daughter Edith. He is buried at St Mary's Catholic Cemetery, Kensal Green.
