= Carlotta Nillson =

Swedish-American actress (1876–1951)

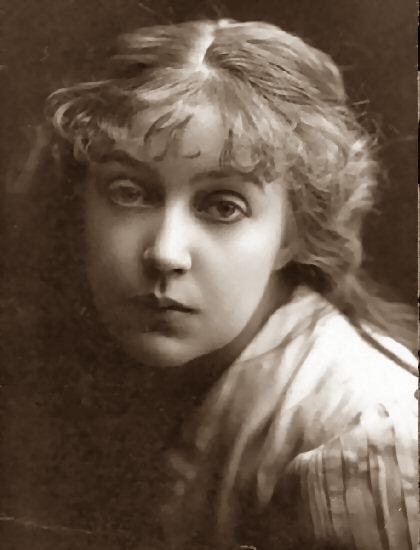
- New York Public Library Digital Gallery
- Born: February 25, 1876; Småland, Sweden
- Died: December 30, 1951 (aged 75); New York City, US
- Occupation: Actress

Carlotta Nillson (February 25, 1876 – December 30, 1951) was a Swedish-born American actress who appeared in at least ten Broadway productions over the first decade of the twentieth century. She was probably best remembered for her portrayal of Rhys Macchesney in the play The Three of Us.

== Early life ==
Carlotta Nillson was born on February 25, 1876, in Småland, Sweden and was raised by her widowed mother. When she was about ten her mother brought her to America where they first settled in Wisconsin and later Minnesota. Nillson's mother was very poor at the time and it was soon decided that she should live with a more affluent neighbor with a large family. Though too young to be a nanny, Nillson was expected to entertain the younger children of the household. Because of her circumstances Nillson was not a happy child (later describing herself as being "born old") and at first found this chore somewhat challenging. This she overcame when it was discovered she had a knack for conjuring up fairy tales rich with goblins, sea pirates and fairies who lived in ice caves along the North Sea.

Several years later Nillson and her mother moved to San Francisco where the young teenager managed to be hired as a walk-on player with Madame Modjeska's stock company. Nillson's stage debut followed in a road production of Friedrich Schiller's play Mary Stuart. Modjeska had noticed how emotional Nillson became during Mary's (Modjeska) execution scene and cast her as one of the maids that accompanied the Scottish Queen to the scaffold.

== Career ==
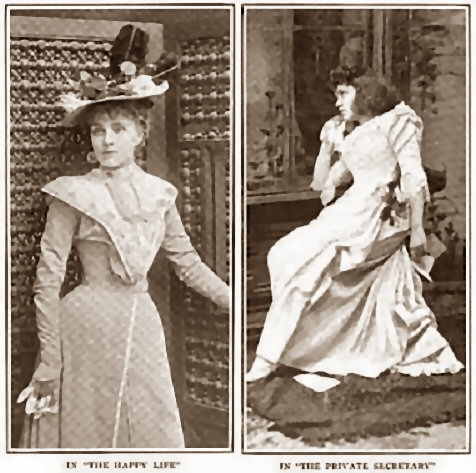
Scenes from The Happy Life and The Private Secretary Theatre Magazine, 1907

Nillson later moved to New York where she worked for Augustin Daly for a time and then went on a grueling forty-week tour of one-night stands as the ingénue in William Gillette's The Private Secretary (a.k.a. Digbey's Secretary) and later toured in John Stetson's The Crust of Society. After touring in Bronson Howard's Civil War play Shenandoah, Nillson decided to take some time off to hone her craft in England under the tutelage of William Farren Jr. and Geneviève Ward. She returned to the theatre in 1898 as Mrs. Dasney in the West End production of Pearl Craigie's The Ambassador at the St. James Theatre and the following year at Terry's Theatre as Evelyn in The Happy Life.

Nillson made her Broadway debut as the slave girl Eunice, in a revival of Stanislaus Stange's Quo Vadis in December 1900 at the Academy of Music Opera House and would remain in demand throughout the decade in Broadway productions and road tours. She was probably best remembered by audiences of that time for her performances as Mrs. Elvsted in Hedda Gabler opposite Minnie Maddern Fiske, the title role in Pinero's Letty and Rhys Macchesney in the Rachel Crothers play The Three of Us, over its long run at the Madison Square Theatre. She twice played the title role in C. M. S. McLellan's melodrama Leah Kleschna, first in the silent film version (her only film released by the Famous Players Film Company) in 1913 and then in a road production produced by Daniel Frohman a year or two later.

In 1913 Nillson formed the Deborah Company and began a tour of North America playing the title role in Deborah by William Legrand Howlaind. Deborah was a story about a sheltered young woman who desperately wants to have a baby, takes a lover and eventually confesses her sin to her priest, long after the child is born. The play premiered in Toronto in May 1913 and was soon shut down and the cast arrested after the city's Chief Censor objected that the play was immoral. A judge later squashed the charges and the play reopened in June at Toronto's Princess Theatre and ran for a week. Afterward though, the play was eventually abandoned.

== Later years ==
Carlotta Nillson appears to have retired from the stage sometime around World War I. She remained active with the Actor's Equity organization and at some point became one of the first actors from the legitimate stage to appear on radio. Nillson came out of retirement on two occasions: she appeared in the 1934 play Re-Echo, but voluntarily withdrew from the cast before its Broadway debut when she learned the playwright, I. J. Golden, wanted her part to be played by actress Florence Walcott, and in late 1940 she joined the cast of Ferenc Molnár's short-lived Broadway play Delicate Story staged at Henry Miller's Theatre.

== Death ==
Carlota Nillson died at the age 75 at a New York area hospital on December 30, 1951.

== Selected performances ==
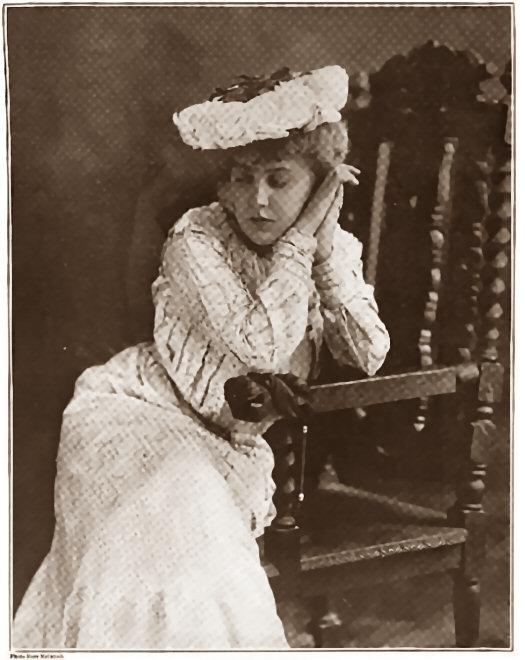
Carlotta Nillson in Theatre Magazine, 1904

- June 2, 1898, St. James's Theatre: Mrs. Dasney, The Ambassador
- November 13, 1899, Terry's Theatre: Evelyn, The Happy Life
- December 31, 1900, Academy of Music Opera House Eunice, Quo Vadis?
- November 10, 1902, Garden Theatre: Countess Labia Latac, Among Those Present
- October 5, 1903, Manhattan Theatre: Mrs. Elvsted, Hedda Gabler
- February 8, 1904, Criterion Theatre (Manhattan): Miriam Selwyn, The Triumph of Love
- April 14, 1904, Wallack's Theatre: Dorothy Graydon, Love's Pilgrimage
- September 12, 1904, Hudson Theatre: title role, Letty
- October 3, 1905, Madison Square Theatre: Elizabeth Annesley, The Man on the Box
- October 17, 1906, Madison Square Theatre: Rhy Macchesney, The Three of Us
- September 5, 1908, Savoy Theatre (New York): title role, Diana of Dobson's
- February 22, 1909, Maxine Elliott Theatre: Thekla Muellet, This Woman and This Man
- December 4, 1940, Henry Miller's Theatre: Mrs. Bernard, Delicate Story

Tours

- 1910: Elsie, For Better,' For Worse
- 1911, title role, "Thyra Avery
- 1913: title role, Deborah
- 1915: title role, Leah Kleschna

Film

- 1913: title role, Leah Kleschna
