= Leah Kleschna (film) =

- Directed by: J. Searle Dawley
- Written by: C. M. S. McLellan (play)
- Produced by: Adolph Zukor; Daniel Frohman
- Starring: Carlotta Nillson
- Cinematography: H. Lyman Broening
- Distributed by: Paramount Pictures
- Release date: December 10, 1913
- Running time: 4 reels
- Country: United States
- Language: Silent (English intertitles)

Leah Kleschna is a lost 1913 American silent drama film directed by J. Searle Dawley and starring Carlotta Nillson, a Swedish stage actress. It was produced by Daniel Frohman and Adolph Zukor under the banner of his newly formed Famous Players Film Company. The film is based on a 1904 play Leah Kleschna by C. M. S. McLellan that starred Mrs. Fiske on Broadway.

This film was remade in 1924 by Paramount as The Moral Sinner.

== Plot ==
Leah, daughter of Parisian master thief Kleschna, has been forced since early childhood to steal. While robbing a charity bazaar, she is rescued from a fire by Paul Sylvain, whom she falls in love with, and wants to be redeemed through his help. General Berton wants Paul to prevent his son, Raoul, from meeting Leah, as Raoul is the brother of Paul's fiancée. Kleschna is told to leave France by Paul, and he endeavors to steal the necklace intended for Paul's fiancée, Claire, before he departs.

Compelled by her father, Leah is made to break into Paul's house and is immediately caught, but recognizes her hero. Instead of turning her over to the police, he sympathetically questions her and she confesses that her father forces her to steal. At this moment, Raoul drunkenly enters the room and, out of jealousy, accuses Paul of being unfaithful to his fiancée. Leah dramatically confesses that she is a thief and came to steal the necklace, at which she is ushered out of the house. Raoul leaves as well, and Paul discovers the necklace missing.

Initially, Paul believes that he has been duped by Leah, as she has left her father and started a new life elsewhere. However, it is revealed that Raoul was the thief and Leah obtains the jewels. His engagement to Claire has been terminated, and he finds Leah far from Paris, where she has become a redeemed woman in his absence. He proposes marriage to her, and her wedding gift is the necklace that brought them together.

== Cast ==
- Carlotta Nillson as Leah Kleschna
- House Peters as Paul Sylvain
- Hal Clarendon as Kleschna
- Alexander Gaden as Schram
- Frank H. Crane as Raoul Berton
- Vincent Sternroyd as General Berton
- Madlaine Traverse as Claire Berton
- Anabel Dennison as Charlotte
- Elenore Flowers as Sophie

== Reception ==
Billboard gave the film a positive review, praising the settings, cinematography, and Carlotta Nillson's acting in particular.

Moving Picture World reviewer George Blaisdell was also very positive, describing the interiors as "elaborate and luxurious" and praised the performances of the actors.

== See also ==
- List of Paramount Pictures films
