= Augusta Glosé =

American vaudeville performer (1877-1976)

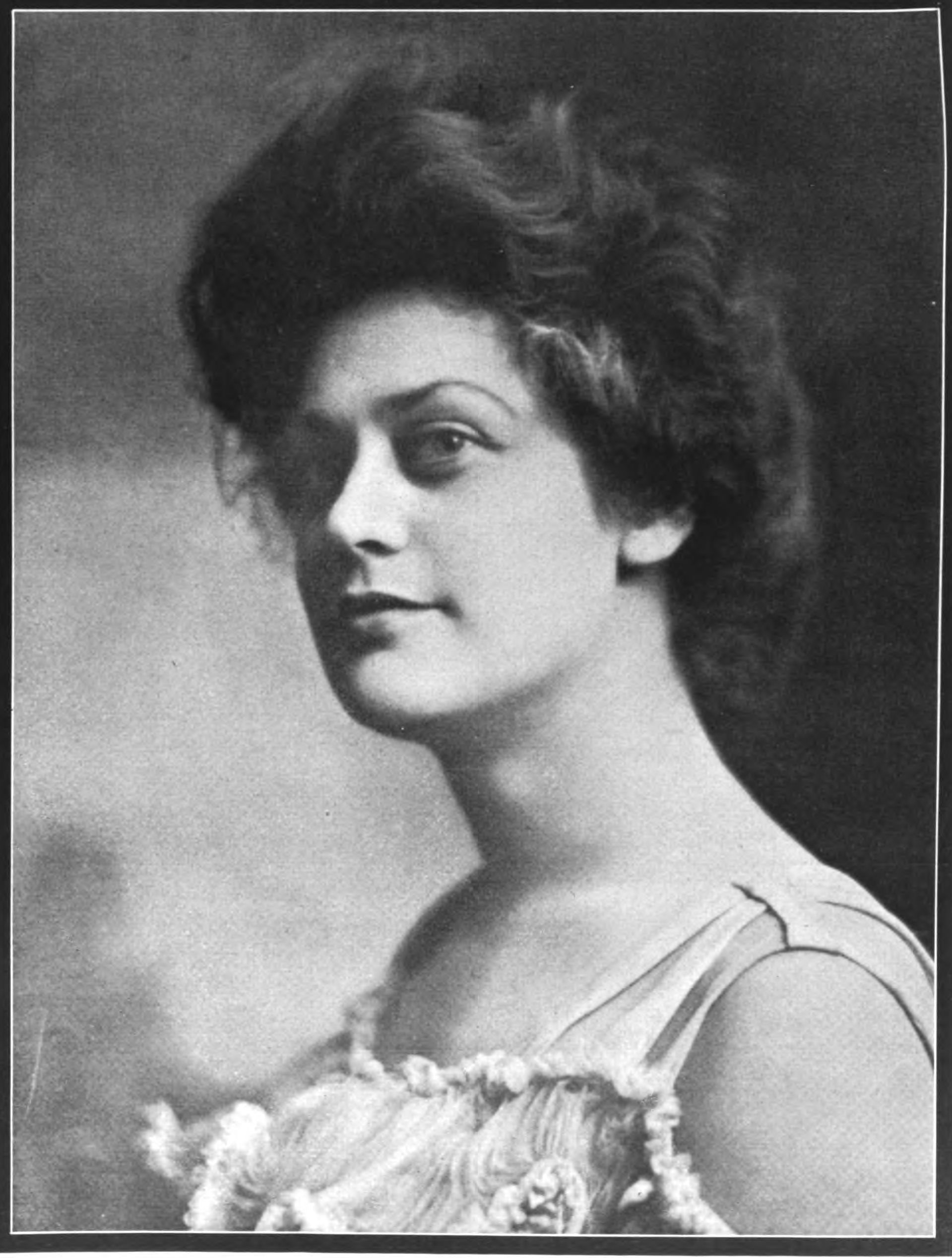
Glosé from a 1908 publication

Augusta Glosé (June 2, 1877 – September 24, 1976), also known as Augusta Glose, later Augusta Glose Leeds, was an American comedic actress and musical performer in vaudeville.

== Early life ==
Augusta Linda Glose was born in Philadelphia, Pennsylvania, the daughter of musician, vocal coach, and composer Adolph Frederic Glose, who was also her piano teacher. Her mother, Linda Weisgerber Glose, was a soprano. When she was 12, Augusta met Helena Modjeska and was inspired to pursue a career on the stage.

== Career ==
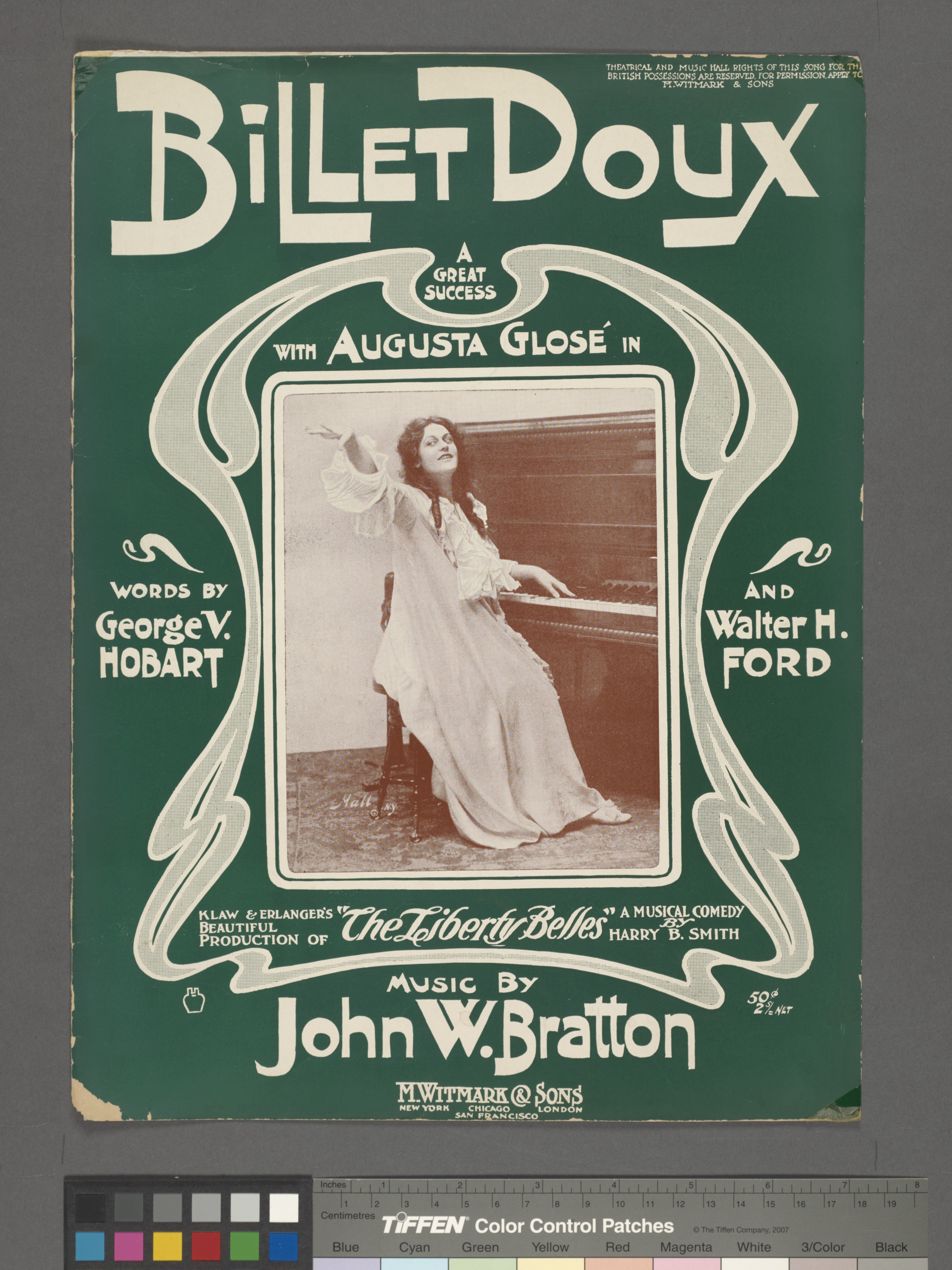
Sheet music featuring a photograph of Augusta Glosé

Glosé appeared on Broadway twice, in William Gillette's Because She Loved Him So (1899) and in The Liberty Belles (1901-1902). She also played duets with her father in concert, for a time. In 1903 she performed at a benefit concert for the New York Home for Destitute Crippled Children.

She developed a novelty vaudeville act, a "pianologue", that involved telling jokes and stories while playing a piano. (Another American woman performing pianologues in the same period was Cora Folsom Salisbury. Journalist Kate Field also worked in this format for a time, after rehearsing with Adolph Glose.) "I really like this vaudeville work," she assured an interviewer in 1904. "Audiences are kind, and I think they rather like my daring."

She announced a retirement from the stage when she married in 1907, but soon resumed her performances. In 1918 she joined Stage Women's War Relief to present a canteen entertainment for soldiers and sailors in New York City.

== Personal life ==
Glosé became the second wife of Kansas City businessman Charles Starr Leeds in 1907. They had a daughter, Linda Augusta Leeds (1912-1988). Augusta Glose was widowed when Charles S. Leeds died in 1939, the same year her father died. Augusta Glose Leeds died in 1976, aged 99 years.

The future Princess Anastasia of Greece and Denmark was briefly (from 1907 to 1908) Glosé's sister-in-law, when they were both married to brothers (Charles S. Leeds and William B. Leeds). In widowhood Nancy Leeds opposed Augusta Glosé's stage career, believing it threatened the Leeds family's social respectability.
