= C. M. S. McLellan =

American dramatist

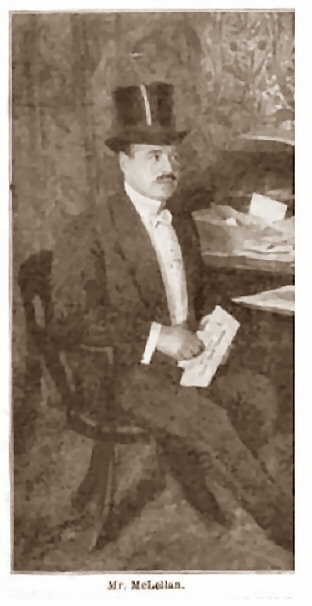
- The Sketch; December 11, 1901
- Born: Charles Morton Stewart McLellan; September 4, 1865; Bath, Maine, USA
- Died: September 16, 1916 (aged 51); Esher, Surrey, England, UK
- Other names: Charles M. S. McLellan; Hugh Morton
- Occupation: Playwright
- Spouse: Marie Adelaide

Charles Morton Stewart McLellan (1865–1916) was a London-based American playwright and composer who often wrote under the pseudonym Hugh Morton. McLellan is probably best remembered for the musical The Belle of New York and drama Leah Kleschna.

== Early life ==
McLellan was born on September 4, 1865, in Bath, Maine to William H. and Florida (née McLanathan) McLellan. His father was a successful wholesaler who later formed the shipbuilding firm, E and S. Company. Florida McLellan, the daughter of a ship's captain, was described in her 1898 obituary as having "unusual business talent and tact." At an early age, McLellan's family moved to Boston, where he attended Hopkinson School (founded by the father of artist Charles Hopkinson) and Chauncy Hall Preparatory School.

== Career ==
McLellan began as a journalist, eventually rising to become editor of the publication Town Topics. After finding success in the late 1890s, he left journalism to write full-time for the stage. Over the remainder of his life, McLellan produced a steady stream of mostly light and often popular musical comedies, frequently in collaboration with the composer Gustave Kerker and later Ivan Caryll.

McLellan's first major success, The Belle of New York, opened at the Casino Theatre on September 28, 1897, to mixed reviews and closed after a two-month run. The following year the show was brought to London, where it opened at the Shaftesbury Theatre on April 12, 1898, and went on to have an extremely successful run of 697 consecutive performances, closing on December 30, 1899. The Belle of New York later proved successful on tours of Australia, New Zealand and the British provinces and returned to Broadway for revival engagements in 1900 and 1921. The musical was made into two Hollywood films, the first in 1919 with Marion Davies, Etienne Girardot and L. Rogers Lytton, and the second in 1952 with Fred Astaire, Vera-Ellen, Marjorie Main and Keenan Wynn.

Leah Kleschna, a melodrama about the daughter of a Paris jewel thief, was first produced at the Manhattan Theatre in December 1904, and the following year at London's New Theatre. Minnie Maddern Fiske played the title role in New York, and Lena Ashwell played it in London. Leah Kleschna was portrayed by Carlotta Nillson in the 1913 silent film version of the play produced by the Famous Players Film Company.

== Death ==
McLellan died on September 21, 1916, at his long-time residence in Esher, a small town on the outskirts of Greater London. He was survived by his wife, Marie Adelaide McLellan, a native of Brooklyn, New York. The couple had three children, Gabrielle, Hugh and Elizabeth. A few years after his death his son married the French actress Yvonne Arnaud and in 1927 Marie McLellan published a revised version of The Belle of New York. His younger brother, George Brinton McLellan (1867–1932), was a successful London-based theatrical manager and producer probably best known for the popular play Is Zat So? and for his marriages to musical comedy actresses Pauline Hall and Madge Lessing.

== Works ==
Source: Who's Who in the Theatre:

- 1897- An American Beauty
- 1898- Whirl of the Town
- 1898- The Belle of New York
- 1898- The Telephone Girl
- 1898- In Gay New York
- 1899- Yankee Doodle Dandy
- 1901- The Girl Up There
- 1903- Glittering Gloria
- 1903- The Wire Walker
- 1905- Leah Kleschna
- 1905- On the Love Path
- 1906- The Jury of Fate
- 1907- Nelly Nell
- 1907- The Shirkers
- 1908- The Pickpockets
- 1910- The Strong People (lyrics)
- 1911- Marriage a la Carte
- 1911- The Pink Lady
- 1911- The Affair in the Barracks
- 1912- Oh! Oh! Delphine
- 1913- The Little Café
- 1914- The Fountain
- 1915- Around the Map
- 1921 - The Whirl of New York
