= Paula Edwardes =

Actor

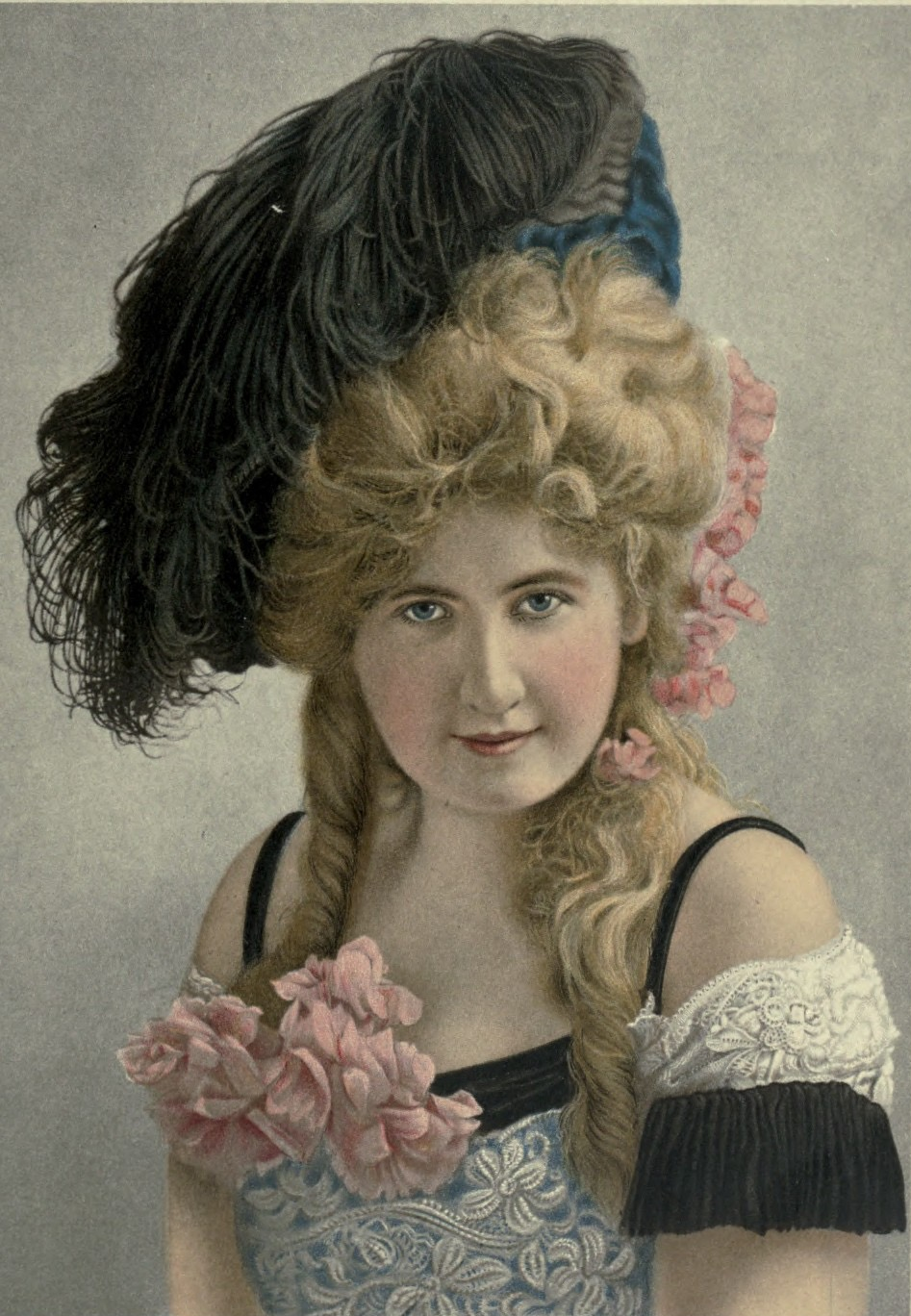
Paula Edwardes, from a 1904 magazine cover.

Paula A. Edwardes (1878 – after 1926) was an American stage performer in musical comedies and vaudeville.

== Early life ==
Edwardes was born in New York City or possibly Boston, Massachusetts, and raised in Boston, where she began her stage work as a chorus girl. She made her stage debut in 1894 in the chorus of the premiere production of the burlesque opera Tabasco which was mounted by Thomas Q. Seabrooke.

== Career ==
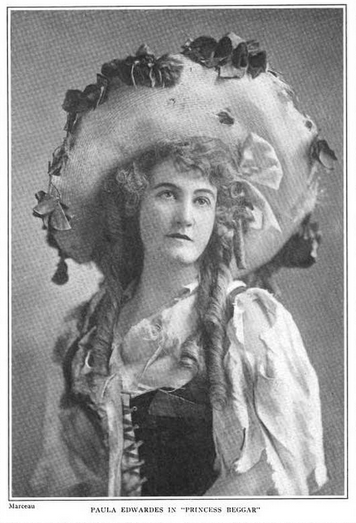
Paula Edwardes in 1907, in costume for Princess Beggar

She had a part in The Belle of New York (1897), which traveled to London; her sister Peggy Edwardes was also in the company. She was also in The Great Ruby. Her Broadway appearances included roles in A Runaway Girl (1898–1899); The Show Girl (1902); The Defender (1902); Winsome Winnie (1903); The Man from Now (1906); and The Princess Beggar (1907). Edwardes was known for performing soubrette parts using an exaggerated accent called "Americanized Cockney" by one reviewer.

In 1906, ragtime composer Cora Folsom Salisbury wrote a valse caprice for piano named "Paula" and dedicated it to Edwardes. In 1907, she contracted to provide "electric music" (recordings) in theatre lobbies before her live performances, one of the first musical theatre stars to be recorded for such purposes.

At the end of 1907, rumors arose that she was engaged to marry steel magnate Joseph E. Schwab, which both parties denied. In 1910, she was headlining a variety show in New York City.

== Later life ==
As Edwardes grew older, she was no longer suited to soubrette parts and did not win other roles. "Thus Paula Edwardes, when her youth faded, faded simultaneously from view," explained critic George Jean Nathan; he told of an encounter with the older Edwardes, dressed girlishly and claiming to be her own teenaged niece, in hopes of reclaiming the fame of her earlier days. In 1926, a police officer found Edwardes, holding a crucifix and praying in the rain, on a street corner in New York City. She said that a dream had instructed her to do so, and she was escorted to Bellevue Hospital for care.
