= Princess Theatre (Toronto) =

Live theatre venue in Toronto, Ontario, Canada

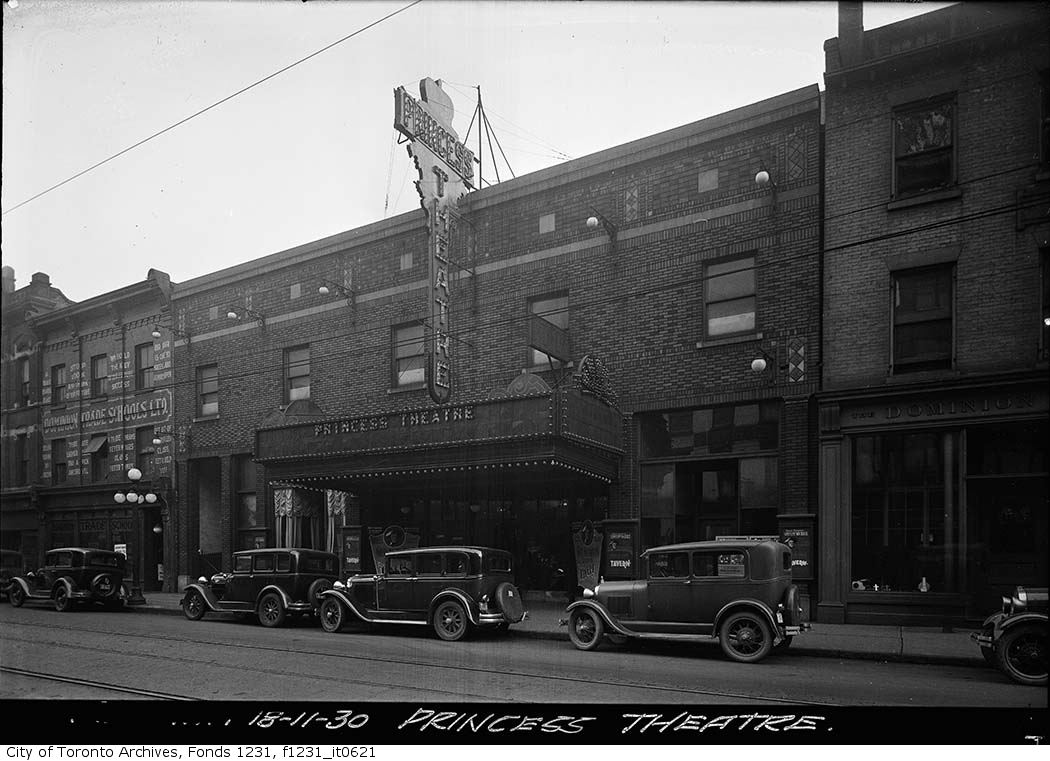
- The "New" Princess Theatre in 1930
- Interactive map of the Princess Theatre area
- Former names: The Academy of Music (1889-1895)

General information
- Status: Demolished
- Location: 167 King Street West, Toronto, Ontario, Canada
- Coordinates: 43.647554°N 79.384744°W
- Inaugurated: November 6, 1889
- Demolished: 1931

The Princess Theatre was an early live theatre in Toronto, Ontario, Canada. It opened in 1889, was destroyed by fire in 1915, rebuilt in 1917 and finally demolished in 1931 for a civic street expansion project. It was both a live theatre and music venue, opening as The Academy of Music. It was Toronto's first live theatre venue and showed productions of touring plays, performed by local and international actors.

== History ==
Two live theatre venues in Toronto burned down in 1883, notably the Royal Opera House and the Queen's Theatre. Neither was rebuilt. The Princess Theatre was built by Frank W. Martineau. It opened on November 6, 1889 on King Street West between York and Simcoe Streets as the Academy of Music with a performance by violinist Nora Clench. Its first play was David Garrick the next day, performed by the Wood - St. John English Comedy Company. The building also was the home of the H. N. Shaw theatre school. One notable alumni was Walter Huston.

In 1895, the building was fully renovated and renamed the Princess Theatre. The renovation provided a fully new entrance, new enlarged stage and new gallery around the hall. As well as the auditorium, it contained a ballroom, banquet room, art gallery and drawing room. It was wired for electricity and was the first such building in Toronto. Ticket prices were raised, now increased in range from 25 cents to CA$1.5 (equivalent to $64.15 in 2025). The theatre's grand re-opening was on September 1, 1895 with a special musical program. The house orchestra backed singer Mlle. Strauss and Signor Pierre Delasco. The first production was Runnymede starring Frederick Warde.

The hall was also used for events other than theatre and music. A boxing title match was held at the Princess on May 23, 1896, between Tommy Dixon and Frank Zimpher, for the featherweight boxing title. Films of other fights were presented also. The theatre also was the location for political speeches. John A. Macdonald was known to have held one of his most rousing speeches, where he attacked Commercial Unionists, delivering the line "A British subject I was born, a British subject I will die."

Toronto-born actress Mary Pickford made her first appearance on stage at the Princess in 1899. Seven-year-old Mary (then Gladys Smith) portrayed a girl and a boy, while her younger sister Lottie was cast in a silent part in Cummings Stock Company's production of The Silver King, while their mother played the organ.

In 1907, the Princess showcased Madame Butterfly, the sensation of the opera world twice. The Canadian premiere was a production by the H. W. Savage Company in April. To capitalize on the interest, the Princess Theatre management decided to put on a second production of the opera in November. The opera played for four nights and each had different singers. Those singing the role of Madame Butterfly were Phoebe Strakosch, Rena Vivienne, a "Miss Wolff" and Strakosch again in the final night. Strakosch would perform the role numerous times in her career.

In 1913, the theatre was the center of a scandal around the play Deborah by William Legrand Howlaind starring Carlotta Nillson. Deborah was a story about a sheltered young woman who desperately wanted to have a baby, takes a lover and has a child, eventually confessing her sin to a priest. The play premiered in May. Its opening night was attended by Toronto's Chief Censor William Banks and the Reverend John Coburn. Banks decided the play was immoral, and ordered charges to be laid. The play was shut down and the cast arrested. A judge later squashed the charges and the play reopened in June at the Princess, after significant changes were made to satisfy Banks. It ran for a week with New York producers attending to decide whether to stage it in New York. Specifically, the sequence where Deborah turns out the light was cut at the end of Act II. The crowd for the re-opening registered its protest by cheering the end of Act II, in which Deborah had taken a lover, despite the cut. Critics complained that the cuts to the play left it disjointed. The play was eventually abandoned. Despite its notoriety, the play was never published.

The theatre was destroyed due to a fire on May 7, 1915, causing an estimated CA$125,000 (equivalent to $3,364,754 in 2025) worth of damage, and gutting most of the building. The fire originated in the offices of the Metropolitan Racing Club on the second floor and spread quickly to the rest of the building, destroying it in 90 minutes. It was rebuilt by B. C. Whitney, along with New York producers Klaw and Erlanger and re-opened in 1917 as the 'New Princess Theatre.' The new theatre seated 1,650, at the time the largest in town. Its first play was Showtime.

The end came in 1931. As part of a project to relieve traffic congestion, University Avenue was to be extended south from Queen Street to Front Street and the Princess lay directly in its path. The city expropriated buildings in the way, including the Princess Theatre. The final production was The Tavern starring George Cohan in December 1930. The City eventually paid CA$371,088 (equivalent to $7,430,811 in 2025) for the theatre site.

== Notable actors and performers ==
The actors and performers at the Princess were typically Americans appearing in a touring Broadway production, or English actors travelling in a touring production from London. Several Canadian performers did appear at the Princess, (such as Margaret Anglin, Marie Dressler and Mary Pickford) typically when their Broadway show travelled to Toronto.

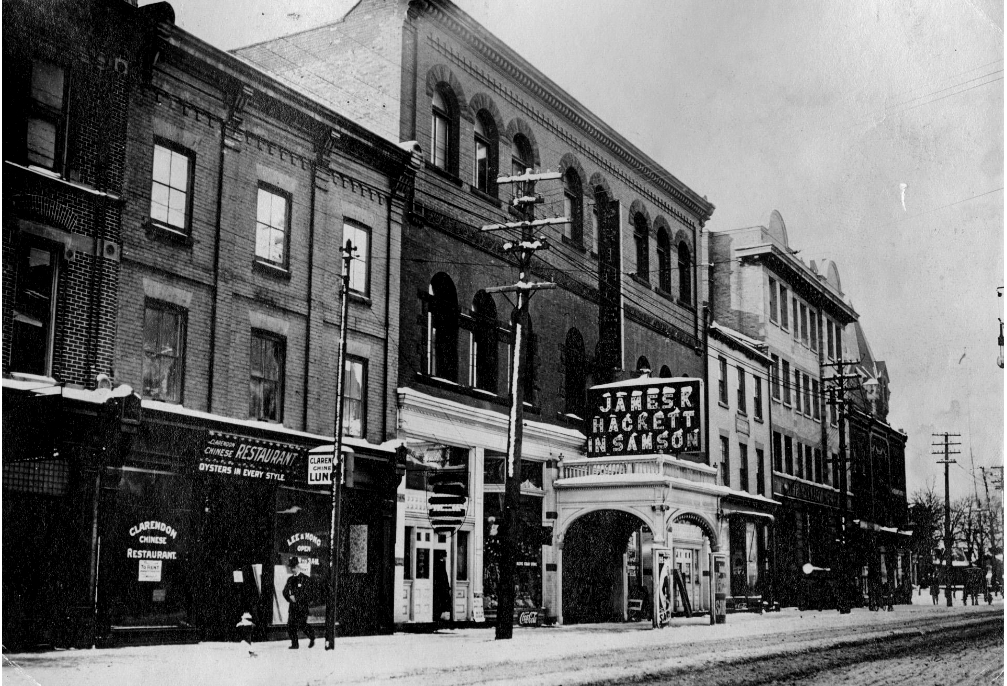
The original Princess Theatre in 1910

From 1890 to 1915:

- Margaret Anglin
- Julia Arthur
- Sarah Bernhardt
- Billie Burke
- Richard Carle
- William H. Crane
- John Drew Sr.
- Elsie Ferguson
- Johnston Forbes-Robertson
- William Gillette
- Lulu Glaser
- Nat Goodwin
- Joseph Hart
- John Martin-Harvey
- DeWolf Hopper
- Henry Irving
- Laurence Irving
- Elsie Janis
- Julia Marlowe
- Henry Miller
- Carlotta Nillson
- James O'Neill
- Mary Pickford
- E. H. Sothern
- Ellen Terry
- E. S. Willard
- Hattie Williams
- Francis Wilson

Source: Toronto Star, May 1915

From 1917 to 1930:

- George Arliss
- Fay Bainter
- Marie Cahill
- Ruth Chatterton
- George Cohan
- Jack Donahue
- Marie Dressler
- Henry V. Esmond
- Helen Hayes
- Raymond Hitchcock
- Madge Kennedy
- Beatrice Lillie
- Robert Mantell
- Cyril Maude
- Phyllis Neilson-Terry
- Chauncey Olcott
- Otis Skinner
- Frances Starr
- Lou Tellegen
- Lenore Ulric
- David Warfield

Source: Toronto Star, November 1930
