= The White Hen (musical) =

1907 musical

The White Hen (originally titled The Girl from Vienna) is a musical in two acts with music by composer Gustav Kerker, a book by Roderic C. Penfield, and lyrics co-authored by Penfield and Paul West. Set in Tyrol, Austria, the story takes place at an inn, 'The White Hen', owned by Hensie Blinder. The musical begins after Blinder returns from a trip to Vienna in which he engaged a matrimonial agency to help him find a wife. Upon his return to the inn, several women arrive in response to the advertisement placed by the agency and a comedy of errors ensues; including Blinder mistakenly believing he has committed the crime of bigamy.

== Performance history ==
The White Hen was initially performed outside of New York City for tryout performances during which time adjustments were made to the work by its creators. This included a change to the title which was initially The Girl from Vienna. The name was changed after the original production's male lead, Louis Mann, insisted that the work be renamed so as not to indicate that his character was not the star of the show.

The White Hen premiered at Broadway's Casino Theatre on February 16, 1907. It ran at that theatre for 94 performances; closing on May 18, 1907. Produced by The Shubert Organization, the production was co-directed by Julian Mitchell and J. C. Huffman. The sets were designed by Ernest Albert and Arthur Voegtlin. The production starred Louis Mann as Hensie Blinder, Louise Gunning as Pepi Gloeckner, Lotta Faust as Lisa Sommer, Ralph C. Herz as Eric Weiss, Robert Michaelis as Paul Blancke, Leona Stephens as Lottchen Spring, Carrie E. Perkins as Sonia Matemoff, and Otis Sheridan as Lieutenant Wilhelm Klopstock among others.
