= Raymond Bloomer =

American actor

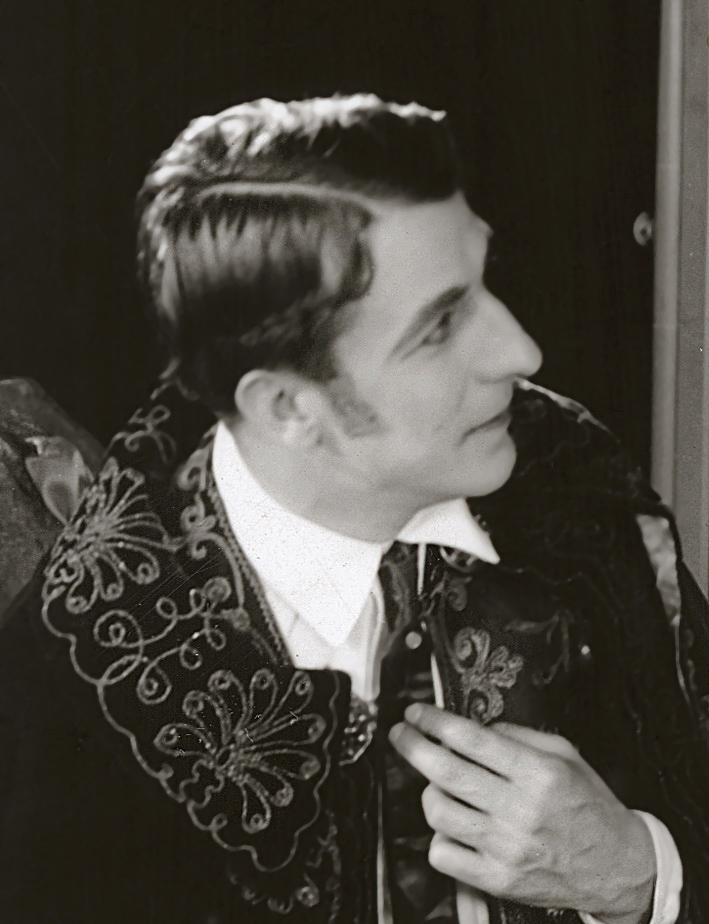
- Born: December 9, 1886; Rochester, New York, U.S.
- Died: November 1, 1948 (aged 61); New York City, New York, U.S.
- Occupation: Actor
- Years active: 1913–1927

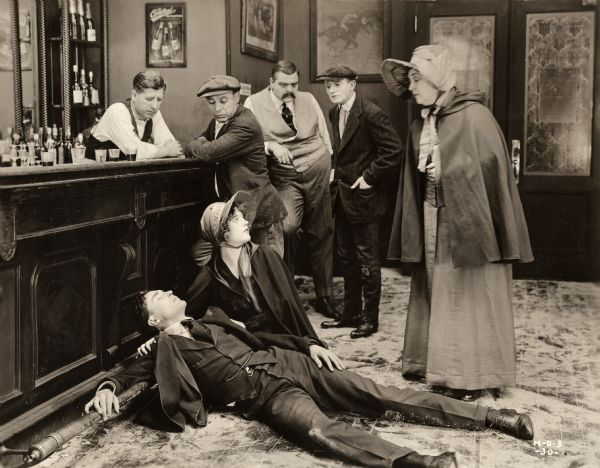
Beaten senseless in an underworld bar, Raymond Bloomer is aided by Marion Davies in a scene still from the 1919 silent drama The Belle of New York.

Raymond Bloomer (December 9, 1886 – November 1, 1948) was an American actor who appeared in 22 films between 1913 and 1927.

== Life ==
After receiving a scholarship, Bloomer left Rochester, New York, when he was 18 and went to New York City to study music at a conservatory. Another student's illness led to his taking a part in a play. He went on to act in stock theater companies in several cities, including Buffalo, Detroit, and Montreal. His work in films included Vitagraph productions.

Bloomer's Broadway credits include Naughty Marietta (1910), The Revue of Revues (1911), The Duchess (1911), Baron Trenck (1912), A Good Little Devil (1913), The Squab Farm (1918), King Richard III (1920), Macbeth (1921), and Swords (1921).

== Filmography ==
| Year | Title | Role |
|---|---|---|
| 1913 | Retribution | |
| 1913 | A Bolt from the Sky | The Detective |
| 1915 | What's Ours? | |
| 1915 | Philanthropic Tommy | |
| 1916 | The Marriage Bond | |
| 1916 | Kennedy Square | Langdon Willetts |
| 1918 | The Prodigal Wife | Dr. Frederick Farnham |
| 1918 | A Woman of Impulse | Count Nerval |
| 1918 | Out of a Clear Sky | Crown Prince |
| 1919 | Break the News to Mother | Dave Bray |
| 1919 | The Belle of New York | Jack Bronson |
| 1920 | The Vice of Fools | Granville Wingate |
| 1921 | The Love Light | Giovanni |
| 1922 | The Town That Forgot God | David, as a man |
| 1922 | Broadway Rose | Hugh Thompson |
| 1922 | Other Women's Clothes | Barker Garrison |
| 1923 | The Net | Bruce Norman |
| 1923 | If Winter Comes | Lord Tybar |
| 1924 | Greater Than Marriage | Vincent Marbridge |
| 1925 | The Fool | Jerry |
| 1925 | A Woman of the Sea | Peter the Fisherman |
| 1927 | Sensation Seekers | Reverend Lodge |
