= Asbury Park Press =

Newspaper published in Asbury Park, New Jersey

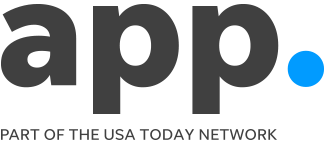
- Type: Daily newspaper
- Format: Broadsheet
- Owner: USA Today Co.
- Editor: Phil Freedman
- Founded: 1879
- Headquarters: 3600 Highway 66; Neptune, New Jersey 07754; United States
- Country: United States
- Circulation: 11,513 (as of 2024)
- OCLC number: 16894042
- Website: app.com

The Asbury Park Press, formerly known as the Shore Press, Daily Press, Asbury Park Daily Press, and Asbury Park Evening Press, is the third largest daily newspaper in the state of New Jersey. Established in 1879, it has been owned by Gannett since 1997. The newspaper is part of the USA Today Network. It has a history of winning and almost winning national awards for its public service and investigative reporting.

== Early history ==
The Asbury Park Press was founded under the name Shore Press in 1879 by Dr. Hugh S. Kinmonth; a publication that was only published once a week. In October 1884 the paper was sold at auction to S. T. Hendrickson and W. W. Conover; men who already owned a considerable amount of stock in the newspaper. Hendrickson and Conover in turn sold the paper to the brothers Roderic C. Penfield and Norman W. Penfield in December 1884. The brothers owned the publishing and editing firm Penfield Bros. and took over the publishing and editing of the newspaper at this point with Norman serving as managing editor.

The Penfield brothers significantly expanded the physical size of the Shore Press, improved the quality of the journalism, and made innovative improvements to the design and layout of the paper. In June 1887 the brothers founded the Daily Press as a companion publication to the Shore Press. When initially established, the Daily Press was published every weekday morning during the summer months. The brothers continued to own and operate the paper into the year 1895. In August 1895 public notice was given on the financial problems of the Penfield Bros. firm, and the following September the firm was declared bankrupt in orphans court.

Following the bankruptcy of the Penfields, the Shore Press, Daily Press, and the Penfield's publishing plant in Asbury Park were purchased by Dr. Hugh S. Kinmonth at an assignee's sale in October 1895. Kinmonth sold the paper to his nephew, Lyle J. Kinmoth, and after several months of non-publication the paper was relaunched as the Asbury Park Daily Press on March 30, 1896. Under his leadership the Daily Press expanded into a year-round daily publication, with the Shore Press serving as the paper's Sunday publication through 1904. The Asbury Daily Press was renamed the Asbury Park Evening Press beginning with the Monday, June 22, 1903, publication of the paper. It was published under that name until 1974 when its name became the Asbury Park Press, beginning with the Monday, September 30, 1974, publication.

== Awards ==
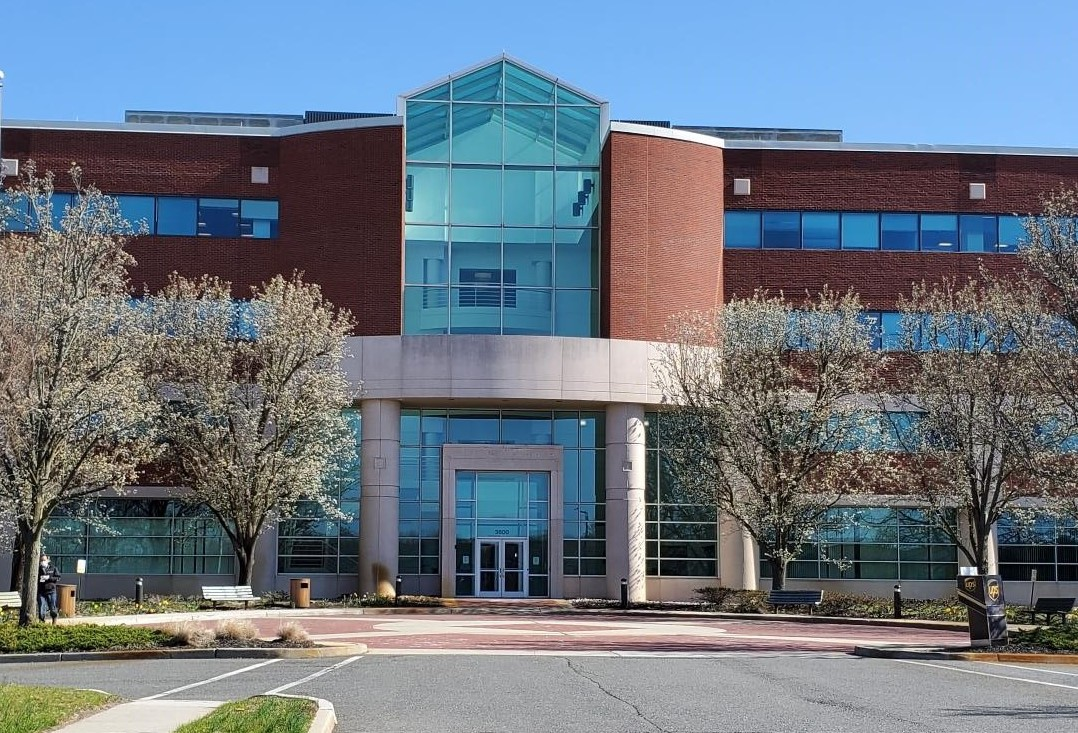
The Asbury Park Press office in Neptune, New Jersey

Award year	Story/staffer	National award
1998	Stephen P. Breen, ten cartoons	Pulitzer Prize for Editorial Cartooning
2004	Profiting from Public Service (published with Gannett New Jersey) by Paul D'Ambrosio, James W. Prado Roberts, Jason Method, Alan Guenther, Jean Mikle, Erik Schwartz, and GNJ staff	Selden Ring Award for Investigative Reporting; Farfel Prize for Excellence in Investigative Reporting; The National Headliner Award for Public Service; SDX Award for Public Service; APME Award for Public Service; Goldsmith Prize for Investigative Reporting, finalist; The Worth Bingham Prize, honorable mention; The Scripps Howard Award for Public Service, finalist; The IRE Award, finalist; Deadline Club Public Service, finalist
2005	Corruption editorials by Randy Bergmann	Scripps Howard Walker Stone Award
2006	"New Jersey's Pension Peril" by Michael L. Diamond, Nicholas Clunn, Eileen Smith, Peter N. Spencer, Ken Tarbous, Rob Jennings, Alan Guenther, Jonathan Tamari and Paul D'Ambrosio	Investigative Reporters and Editors, medium newspapers, finalist
2007	DataUniverse.com created by Paul D'Ambrosio	Knight News Innovation Award, EPpy Awards, finalist; Knight-Batten Awards for Innovation – Crowdsourcing, notable entry
2009	"A Troubled Diagnosis" by Alan Guenther	Investigative Reporters and Editors Award, finalist
2010	"Fighting New Jersey's Tax Crush" by Paul D'Ambrosio, Shannon Mullen, Jean Mikle, Todd B. Bates and Andrea Clurfeld	Pulitzer Prize Public Service Gold Medal, finalist; National Headliner Award, best series in a large daily; APME Public Service Award, medium newspapers; Brechner Freedom of Information Award; Best of Gannett Community Conversation Award
2011	"Barnegat Bay Under Stress" by Kirk Moore, Todd B. Bates with graphics by Jeff Colson	Generoso Pope Award for best local coverage within the New York metropolitan area; APME Public Service Award, medium newspapers, finalist; Best of Gannett Public Service, second place; Online News Association Public Service Award.
2011	"Breaking Point" by Paul D'Ambrosio, Shannon Mullen, Christopher Schnaars, Jean Mikle, Todd B. Bates and Andrea Clurfeld	National Headliner Award, best series in a large daily; Investigative Reporters and Editors award, finalist
2012	"Deadly Decisions" by Shannon Mullen	Deadline Club of NYC, Feature Writing Award; Taylor Family Fairness Award, finalist
2013	"Cheated: Why Lakewood's public schools have failed us" by Shannon Mullen, Ken Serrano, Margaret Bonafide and Todd B. Bates	Deadline Club of NYC, Minority Focus Award
2013	"Superstorm Sandy at the Jersey Shore" by Staff	APME Public Service and Best of Show; National SPJ/SDX Deadline Reporting Award (medium papers); Scripps Howard Breaking News Award, finalist Deadline Club of NYC, Breaking News Award, finalist
2014	"Heroin at the Shore" by Dustin Racioppi and Amanda Oglesby	NYC Deadline Club Awards - Public Service finalist
2015	"Summit for Success" by staff	NYC Deadline Club Awards - Best minority focus - finalist
2015	"The Iron Soldier" by Ken Serrano and Brian Johnston	National Headliners Club - Best series, up to 100,000 circ. - second place NYC Deadline Club Awards - Best newspaper reporting, up to 100,000 circ. - finalist
2016	"Monmouth County Tax Assessment" by Susanne Cervenka	Livingston Awards for Young Journalists - Finalist
2016	"Betrayal of Trust" by Shannon Mullen	National Press Club/Joseph D. Ryle Award for Excellence in Writing on the Problems of Geriatrics; National Headliner Awards/Series writing, under 100,000 - third place
2016	"Tax Crisis" by Paul D'Ambrosio, Susanne Cervenka, Todd B. Bates, Bob Jordan, Michael Symons, Kala Kachmar, Shannon Mullen, Ken Serrano and Michael Diamond	National award for Excellence in Economic Reporting National SDX/SPJ Award for Public Service; Best of Gannett, Public Service Award, large publication division NYC Deadline Club Awards - Best newspaper reporting, up to 100,000 circ.
2016	Hollis R. Towns	APME McGruder Diversity Award
2016	"Childhood Lead Poisoning in New Jersey," by Todd B. Bates	National Association of Black Journalists, Specialty Reporting, finalist
2017	"Municipal Court Cash Machine," Kala Kachmar	Livingston Awards for Young Journalists - Finalist
2017	"Long Fall," Andrew Ford	NYC Deadline Club Awards - Best newspaper reporting, under 100,000 circ.
2017	"The Family Secret," Brian Johnston	Emmy - Mid-Atlantic chapter, Human Interest Feature
2018	"Renter Hell," Shannon Mullen, Payton Guion	NABJ Award for investigations, under 150K; NYC Deadline Club Awards - Winner, newspaper reporting under 100,000; Goldsmith Award, finalist; ASNE Local Accountability, finalist; Investigative Reporters and Editor, Print/Online Division IV, finalist; USA TODAY Network, Public Service Award, finalist
2019	"Protecting the Shield" selected stories by Andrew Ford	Livingston Awards for Young Journalists - Finalists
2019	"Protecting the Shield", by Andrew Ford, Kala Kachmar, Paul D'Ambrosio, Susanne Cervenka, Alex Gecan and Ken Serrano	Silver Gavel Award, American Bar Association; NYC Deadline Club Award, best newspaper story, under 100,000 circ.; NABJ, investigative reporting under 100,000; USA TODAY Network, Public Service Award, finalist
2019	"Protecting the Shield," by Andrew Ford, Kala Kachmar, Paul D'Ambrosio, Susanne Cervenka, Alex Gecan and Ken Serrano	Edward R. Murrow Award, Investigative Reporting, digital news site under 2.5 million unique visitors/month
2020	"Policing the Police", by Andrew Ford	NYC Deadline Club Award, best newspaper story under 100,000 circ; and finalist, Deadline Club Award for Public Service
2020	"Dying to Race," by Stephen Edelson and Frank Esposito	Edward R. Murrow Award, Sports Reporting, digital news sites under 2.5 million unique visitors/month; Best of Gannett, enterprise reporting
2020	"Deadly Chases, Few Arrests," by Andrew Ford	National Assn. of Black Journalists, Investigative Reporting, under 100k newspapers
2020	"Crack vs. Heroin: An unfair system arrested millions of blacks, urged compassion for whites," by Shannon Mullen, Lisa Robyn Kruse, Andrew J. Goudsward and Austin Bogues	National Assn. of Black Journalists, News Series, under 100k newspapers; Silver Gavel Award, finalist
