= Right This Way =

1938 Broadway production

- Music: Brad Greene; Fabian Storey
- Lyrics: Marianne Brown Waters
- Book: Marianne Brown Waters; Parke Levy; Alan Lipscott
- Productions: 1938 Broadway

Right This Way is a Broadway production that opened at the 46th Street Theatre on January 5, 1938, and ran for fifteen performances. It was categorized as an original musical comedy and was set in Paris and Boston. It starred Joe E. Lewis as Spaulding, Leonard Elliott as Bomboski, and Leona Stephens as Lissa.

The interpolated song "I'll Be Seeing You", written by Irving Kahal and Sammy Fain, was featured in the production and has since been recognized as a jazz standard, covered by many musicians.
