= The Belle of New York (musical) =

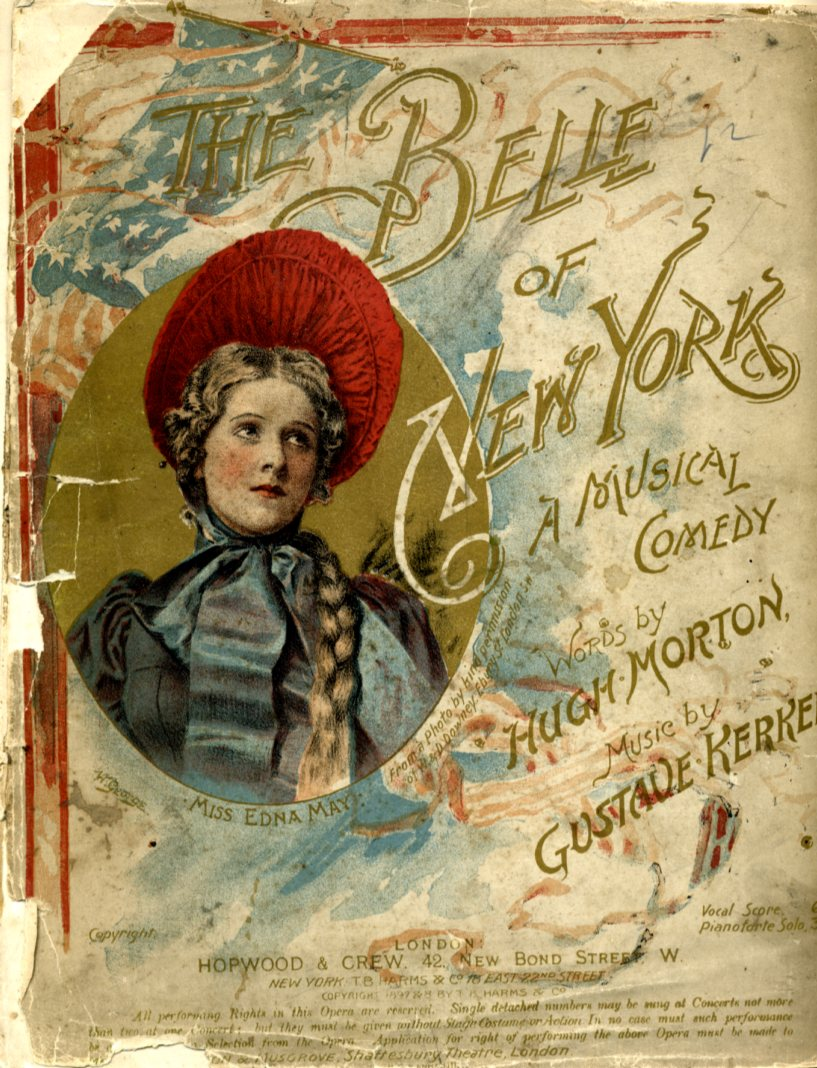
- Vocal score
- Music: Gustave Kerker
- Lyrics: Hugh Morton
- Book: Hugh Morton
- Productions: 1897 Broadway; 1898 West End

The Belle of New York is a musical comedy in two acts, with book and lyrics by Hugh Morton and music by Gustave Kerker, about a Salvation Army girl who reforms a spendthrift, makes a great sacrifice and finds true love.

Opening on Broadway at the Casino Theatre on 28 September 1897, it ran for only 64 performances. After a more encouraging American tour, it subsequently transferred to London at what was then called the Shaftesbury Theatre in 1898, where it was a major success, running for an almost unprecedented 674 performances, and became the first American musical to run for over a year in the West End. The Standard stated that the entire Broadway cast "numbering sixty-three persons" was brought over to London, "the largest stage troupe from the other side of the Atlantic that has ever professionally visited this country." The uniquely American plot and quirky characters were viewed as refreshing by London critics.

The show starred Edna May, whose performance as Violet made her a star in New York and London. Postcards of her in costume became ubiquitous; more photographs of her were sold in London than of any other actress in 1898. In London, the piece opened on 12 April 1898, produced by J. C. Williamson and George Musgrove. The composer conducted at the opening night. Painter Ernest Albert designed the production's sets. The work had stiff competition in London in 1898, as other successful openings included A Greek Slave and A Runaway Girl.

Long runs in Paris, Berlin and elsewhere followed, and there were nine West End revivals over the next four decades. The musical was also produced regularly by amateur groups from 1920 until about 1975. Two film versions were made, in 1919 with Marion Davies, Etienne Girardot and L. Rogers Lytton, and in 1952 with Fred Astaire, Vera-Ellen, Marjorie Main and Keenan Wynn that replaced the original songs with a score by Johnny Mercer and Harry Warren.

In 1921, a rewritten version of the musical called The Whirl of New York premiered on Broadway.

== Synopsis ==
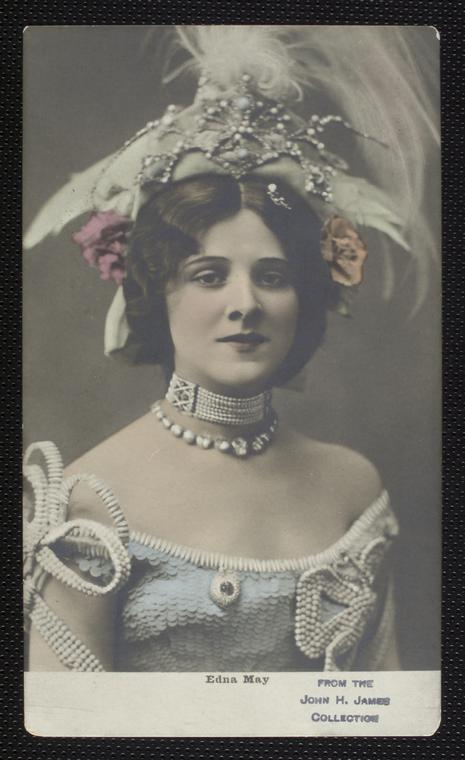
Postcard of Edna May as Violet in The Belle of New York

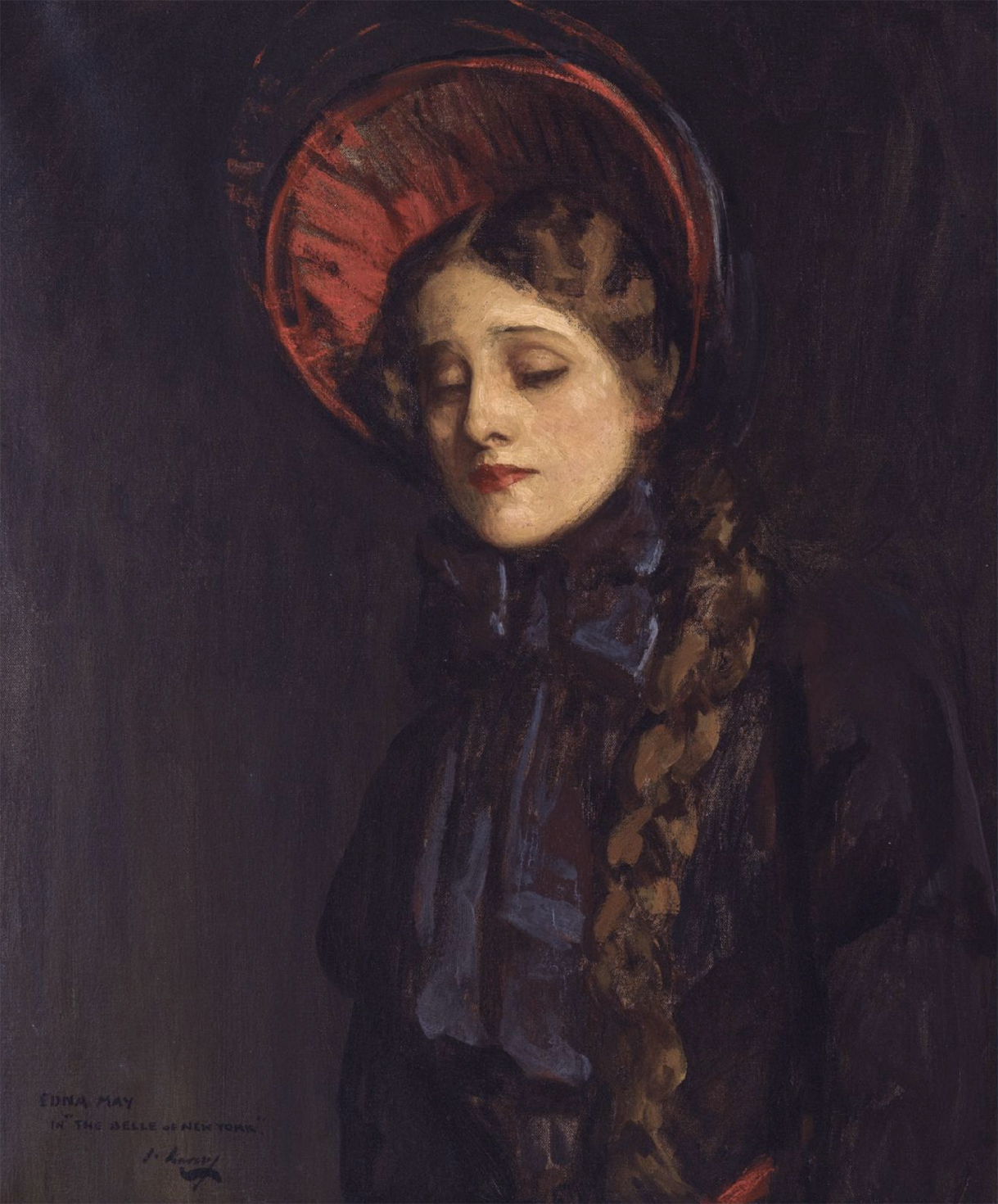
Portrait of Edna May as Violet by John Lavery

Act 1

Ichabod Bronson is a wealthy hypocrite who preaches virtue to the young, so as to leave more scope for dissipation among the old. His son, Harry, is a feather-brained spendthrift, engaged to Cora Angelique, the Queen of Comic Opera. After a riotous stag night, Harry ends up with Fifi, the daughter of Fricot the confectioner. Ichabod discovers them together and disinherits Harry. Deserted by all but Fifi, Harry wanders into Chinatown in New York, where his fickle fancy is taken by a young Salvation Army woman, Violet Gray. She finds her vocation difficult because, though she tries to persuade men to follow her blameless ways, they persist in following her blameless figure. Ichabod discovers that Violet is the daughter of an old friend and announces his intention to leave his huge fortune to her.

Act 2

Harry has taken a job as a salesman in a candy store on Broadway. Violet and her Salvationist colleagues enter the shop, all decked out in short skirts. She knows that Harry is engaged to Cora and wants the couple to be happy. She tells Harry that she is going to change Ichabod's mind about leaving his money to her. On the beach at Narragansett Casino, she sings a risqué French song, scandalising an audience including Ichabod. The effort of performing the song causes her to faint. Matters are further complicated by the persistent attempts of a German lunatic to kill people, particularly Ichabod, and by the quarrels of Portuguese twins, who keep trying to fight duels with one another. Harry has indeed been much influenced by Violet's virtue and has fallen for her. He explains to his father why Violet has behaved so uncharacteristically, and Ichabod forgives him his earlier sins on condition that he marries Violet, which he is now happy to do.

== Roles and cast ==
J. E. Sullivan as Karl von Pumpernick

According to London press reports, the West End cast (listed below) was identical to the New York original.

- Ichabod Bronson (President of the Young Men's Rescue League and Anti Cigarette Society of Cohoes) – Dan Daly
- Harry Bronson (his son) – Harry Davenport
- Karl von Pumpernick (a polite lunatic) – James E. Sullivan
- "Doc" Snifkins – Geo. K. Fortescue
- "Blinky Bill" McGuire (a mixed ale pugilist) – Frank Lawton
- Kenneth Mugg (low comedian of the Cora Angélique Opera Company) – George A. Schiller
- Count Ratsi Rattatoo (of Portugal) – William H. Sloan
- Count Patsi Rattatoo (his twin brother) – William Gould
- Billy Breeze – Edwin W. Hoff
- Mr. Twiddles (Harry's Private Secretary) – Frank Turner
- Mr. Snooper – Lionel Lawrence
- Mr. Peeper – D. T. Macdonald
- William – Albert Wallerstedt
- Violet Gray (a Salvation Army Girl) – Edna May (later Belle Harper)
- Fifi Fricot (a little Parisienne) – Phyllis Rankin (later Toby Claude)
- Kissie Fitzgarter (a music-hall dancer) – Mabel Howe
- Cora Angelique (the Queen of Comic Opera, Doc Sniffkins' daughter) – Helen Dupont
- Mamie Clancy (Bill McGuire's girl) – Paula Edwardes
- Pansy Pinns (a soubrette) – Hattie Moore
- Girls: Betty "The Bat", Myrtle Mince, Queenie Cake, Birdie Seed, Gladys Glee, Dorothy June, Marjorie May and Little Miss Flirt – Martha Franklin, Sylvia Thorne, Rose Witt, Grace Spencer, Irene Bentley, Emily Sanford, Ella Snyder and Rose Witt
- Drummer Boys – Nellie Loomis and Daisy Thompson

== Musical numbers ==
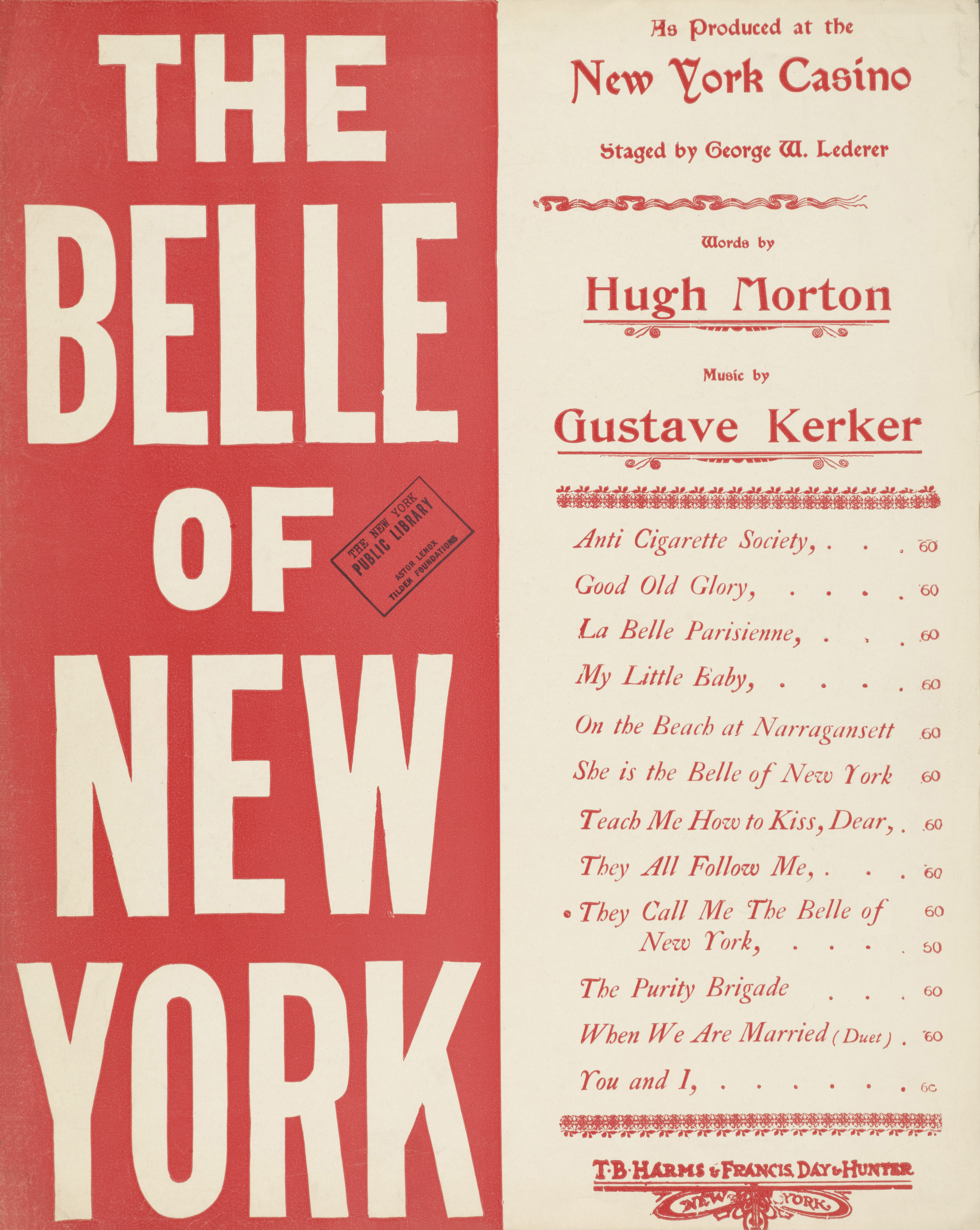
Sheet music cover from The Belle of New York

Act 1

- When a Man Is Twenty-One – Harry and Chorus
- Oh Naughty Mr. Bronson – Chorus
- When I Was Born the Stars Stood Still – Cora and Chorus
- Little Sister Kissie – Kenneth, Kissie and Blinky
- Teach Me How to Kiss, Dear – Fifi
- We Come This Way – Chorus
- The Anti-Cigarette Society – Ichabod
- Wine, Woman and Song – Harry and Chorus
- La Belle Parisienne – Fifi and Bridesmaids
- My Little Baby – Ichabod
- Pretty Little China Girl – Chorus and Corps de Ballet
- They All Follow Me – Violet and Chorus
- She Is the Belle of New York – Blinky
- She Is the Belle of New York (Reprise) – Ichabod, Harry, Violet and Chorus

Act 2

- Oh! Sonny! – Harry and Chorus
- When We Are Married – Fifi and Harry
- The Purity Brigade – Violet and Chorus
- I do, so there! – Violet, Ichabod and Chorus
- Take Me Down to Coney Island – Blinky and Mamie
- On the Beach at Narragansett – Ichabod and Others
- For the twentieth time we'll drink – Chorus
- Oh little Bo Peep – Chorus
- At ze naughty Folies Bergere – Violet
- 'For in the field – Principals

== Critical reception ==
After the New York premiere, The New York Times wrote, "The new burlesque, or extravaganza, at the Casino is as big and showy, as frank and noisy, as highly colored, glittering, and audacious as the best of its predecessors." It found the libretto "with no great attempt at original wit in the prose dialogue, but with a few characteristically happy turns in the lyrics," and the music "reminiscent of Offenbach and Lecocq and Vasseur and Sullivan and David Braham but it is always Kerkeresque."

The London press was welcoming but nonplussed by the piece. The leading theatrical paper The Era wrote, "The Belle of New York is best described as bizarre. It is like nothing we have ever seen here, and it is composed of the oddest incongruities. … The music is decidedly above the average of musical play scores … it is the brightest, smartest, and cleverest entertainment of its kind that has been seen in London for a long time." The Standard also thought the music "much above the average" and "distinctly Offenbachian in melody and orchestration." The paper praised all the performers, particularly "the unctuous humour of Mr. Dan Daly as the elder Bronson, the adroitness of Mr. Harry Davenport as his scapegrace son, the chic of Miss Phyllis Rankin as the Parisian soubrette, and the sweet voice of Miss Edna May as the Salvation maiden."
