= Marie Fedor =

American actress

Marie Fedor was a stage actress from Boston, Massachusetts who performed in theater at the beginning of the 20th century.

== Early life and education ==
Fedor spent most of her early life in Paris, France with her mother. She developed both musical and artistic tastes there. She returned to Boston and entered Radcliffe College. Fedor was forced to end her studies there because of severe illness.

== Career ==
Fedor, a debutante, became well known in Boston society before her entrance into the theater. She made her stage debut in Leah Kleschna, in December 1904, with the stock company of Minnie Maddern Fiske. The premiere occurred at the Manhattan Theatre, Broadway (Manhattan) and 33rd Street. Fedor portrayed the role of a peasant girl in an Austrian village.

== Reception ==
Reviewer Robert Butler commented on Fedor's acting: "She displayed unusual understanding of stage technique. In the role of Frieda, an Austrian peasant girl, she appeared to an advantage that did not fail to win favorable comment. Miss Fedor fitted decidedly well into the beautiful picture of the fifth act. She will bear a deal of watching in the future."
