= Manhattan Theatre =

Former theater in New York City

Coordinates: 40.74930°N 73.98878°W

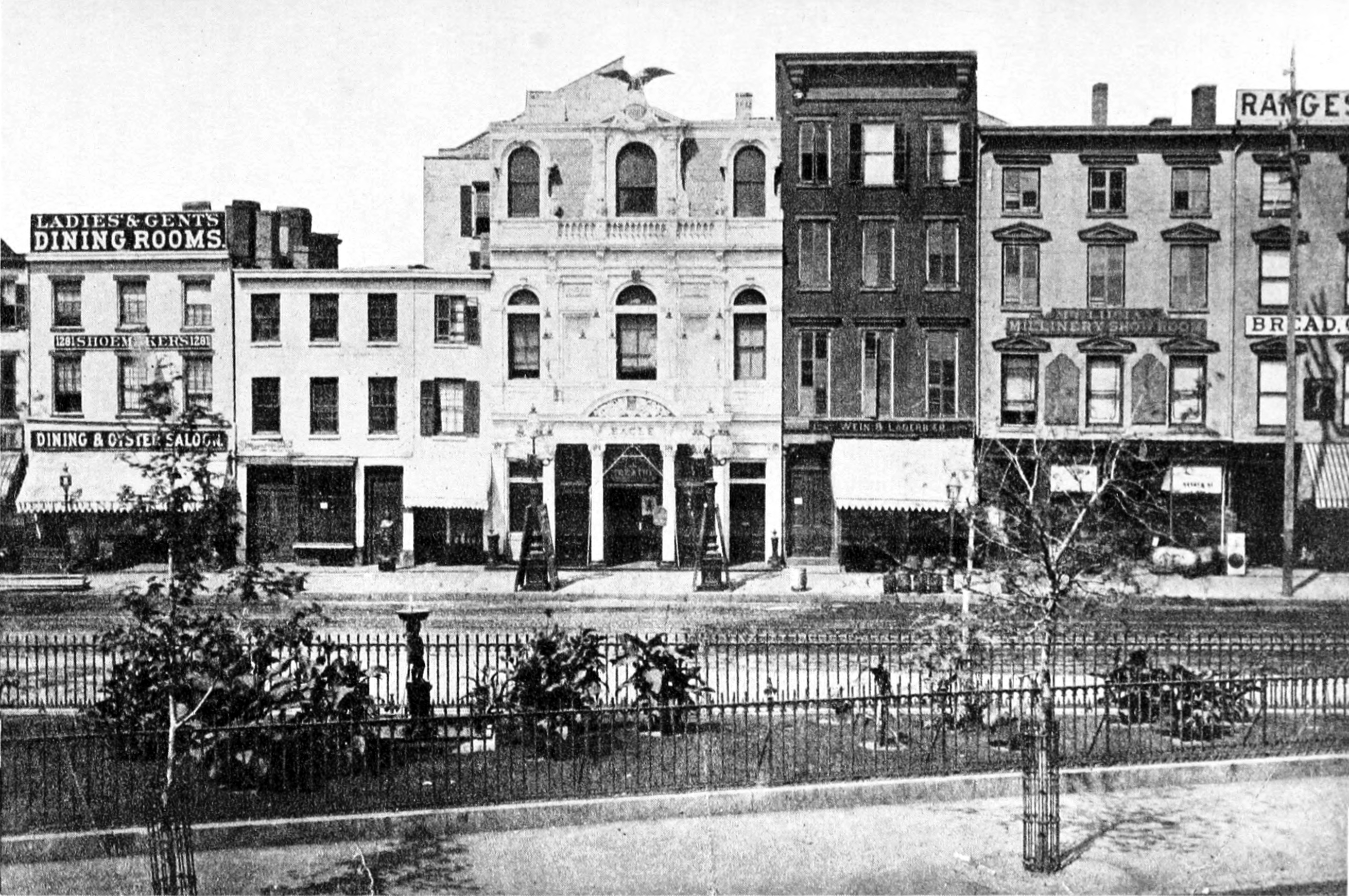
- The Eagle Theatre (center), later the Manhattan Theatre, soon after it was built

General information
- Location: Manhattan, New York City
- Opened: 1875
- Renovated: 1883–1884, 1898
- Demolished: 1909

The Manhattan Theatre was located at 102 West 33rd Street in Midtown Manhattan, New York City, directly across from Greeley Square at Sixth Avenue and 33rd Street. The 1,100-seat theatre opened in 1875 as the Eagle Theatre, and was renamed the Standard Theatre in 1878. All but destroyed by a fire in 1883, it was rebuilt in a more modern style and re-opened in December 1884. In 1898, the Standard was refurbished by architect Howard Constable and renamed the Manhattan Theatre. The theatre was demolished in 1909 for the construction of a flagship Gimbels department store, now the Manhattan Mall.

== Early history ==
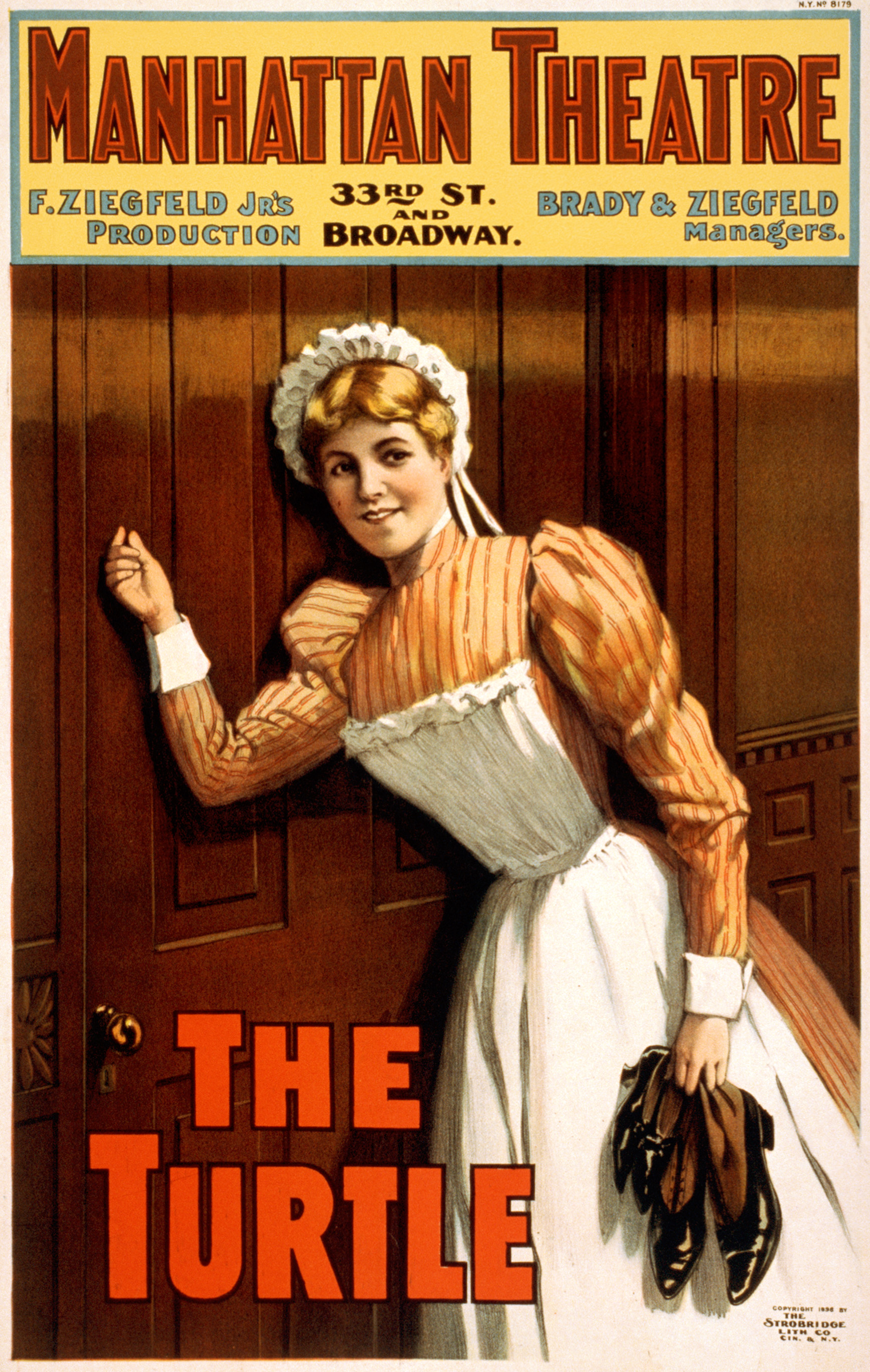
Poster of Sadie Martinot in William Brady and Florenz Ziegfeld's production of The Turtle (1898)

During its first two decades of existence, the theatre played host to many of the finest plays and works of musical theatre of the times, including several of the authorized American premieres of the Gilbert and Sullivan operas in the 1880s, often starring Geraldine Ulmar, Fred Billington, George Thorne and Courtice Pounds. Other notable performers on its stage in these years included Marie Fedor, Emily Stevens and Tyrone Power, Sr. Gilbert and Sullivan's Patience was the theatre's biggest money spinner of the 1880s, running for 177 performances in 1881–82 and earning $100,000. Charlie's Aunt opened at the theatre in 1893.

In 1898, William Brady and Florenz Ziegfeld took over the theatre, renaming it the Manhattan Theatre. Possibly the Theatre's biggest coup was the world premiere of Way Down East, the melodramatic stage play written by Charlotte Blair Parker, which proved to be one of the biggest American stage success of the late 19th and early 20th Centuries. Opening on February 7, 1898, the play ran for 152 performances, ending in June 1898. Among other early productions was Lover's Lane, a 1901 production on rural life, that starred Lillian Lee in the role of Mrs. Jennings.

== Fiske years ==
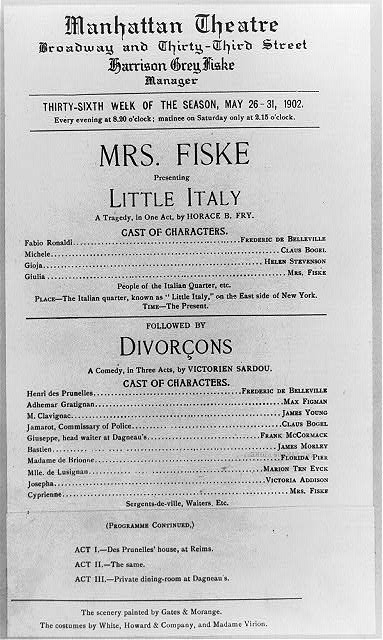
Playbill for Mrs. Fiske's 1902 productions of Little Italy and Divorçons

The Manhattan Theatre became a frequent venue for the theatrical performances of Minnie Maddern Fiske, one of the most famous actresses of the 1890s and early 1900s, renowned for her performances in Ibsen’s plays. Mrs. Fiske also co-managed and directed plays for the Manhattan Theatre. Among Mrs. Fiske's many performances was the leading role in Miranda of the Balcony, a play written by Anne Crawford Flexner, based on the novel by A.E.W. Mason. Produced at the Manhattan Theatre on September 24, 1901, it starred Mrs. Fiske, J.E. Dodson, Emily Stevens, Max Figman, Frank McCormack, Bessie Harris and Mary Maddern. It was directed by Mrs. Fiske and Max Figman. The New York Times review of the opening said: "The opening of the Manhattan Theatre under the management of Harrison Grey Fiske was effected last night, and a new drama entitled "Miranda of the Balcony" was performed for the first time on any stage. The occasion was one which may possibly prove to be significant. The new manager defines his policy in the programme, and the definition is attractive."

Under Harrison Grey Fiske's management (assisted quite regularly by Mrs. Fiske), the Manhattan Theatre enjoyed its most productive years. Starting with Miranda of the Balcony, it produced many great dramas. In Miranda of the Balcony, Emily Stevens had the part of Lady Ethel Mickleham, while Mrs. Fiske played Miranda Warriner, a role for which she was praised for her interpretation of the principal character. In November 1901, the company of Mrs. Fiske staged The Unwelcome Mrs. Hatch at the Manhattan Theatre. The author of the play is either Constance Cary Harrison or David Belasco. The theme of the work has to do with a woman who becomes a social outcast because of marital problems. Emily Stevens played the role of Gladys Lorimer.

In May 1902, Mrs. Fiske put on a revival of Tess of the D'Urbervilles at the theatre. Emily Stevens was among the players in a recreation of this production of Mrs. Fiske first staged in 1897. Stevens became a permanent member of the company of Mrs. Fiske in 1904, following three seasons on stage. Emily Stevens acted the role of Miriam for all 105 performances of Mary of Magdala in 1904. In that same production, which was written by William Winter, Tyrone Power, Sr. played the role of Judas Iscariot. Conflicting records claim that this production was staged either in November 1902 or in 1904.

The Manhattan Theatre presented Becky Sharp in September 1904. Based on Vanity Fair by William Makepeace Thackery, the comedy in four acts was written by Langdon Mitchell. Mrs. Fiske and the Manhattan Company brought it before audiences with Stevens and George Arliss as cast principals. A revival of Hedda Gabler was staged in November 1904 with Mrs. Fiske in the title role and Emily Stevens as Berta. The Henrik Ibsen work played for one week in 1903 with near capacity attendance for each performance. Leah Kleschna was written especially for Mrs. Fiske by C.M.S. McLellan (Hugh Morton). The Manhattan Theatre presented the play about the daughter of a thief in December 1904. The production marked the first original role Fiske had depicted in two years. Stevens, George Arliss, John Mason, and Marie Fedor were among the players. In 1905, the Manhattan Theatre produced The Proud Laird, a comedy by Charles Cartwright and Cosmo Hamilton. It starred Robert Loraine, Hubert Hassard-Short, J.H. Bunny, Sydney Smith, Ida Vernon and Dorothy Donnelly. It was directed by Harrison Grey Fiske, husband of Minnie Maddern Fiske. The Fiske company managed the Manhattan Theatre for eight years, until 1907, when the theatre switched to vaudeville and motion pictures.

== Last years ==
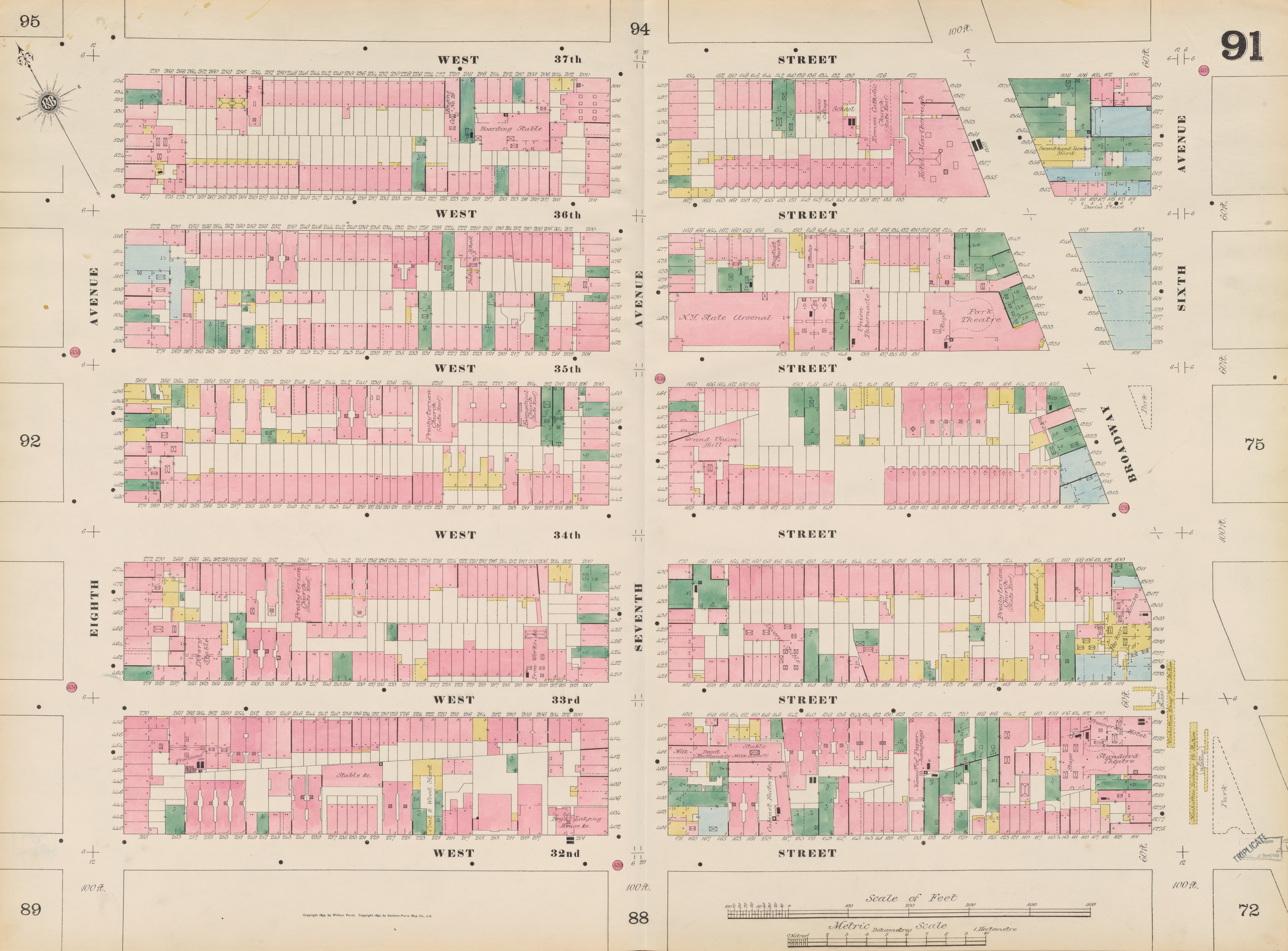
The Standard Theatre, on a map published in 1890

By 1907, the Manhattan Theatre was no longer in demand as a playhouse, so a new owner, William Gane, switched to showing movies instead. The theatre had just one screen, and to justify a 10-cent admission charge, several acts of vaudeville were added to the programs. This was reportedly the first time that a New York theatre had shown movies as the main attraction. Previously, movies had just been supplements to vaudeville.

In 1909, the Manhattan was demolished to make way for Gimbels department store, a structure that still stands today but has been converted into a shopping mall, Manhattan Mall.
