= The Belle of New York (1919 film) =

1919 silent film directed by Julius Steger

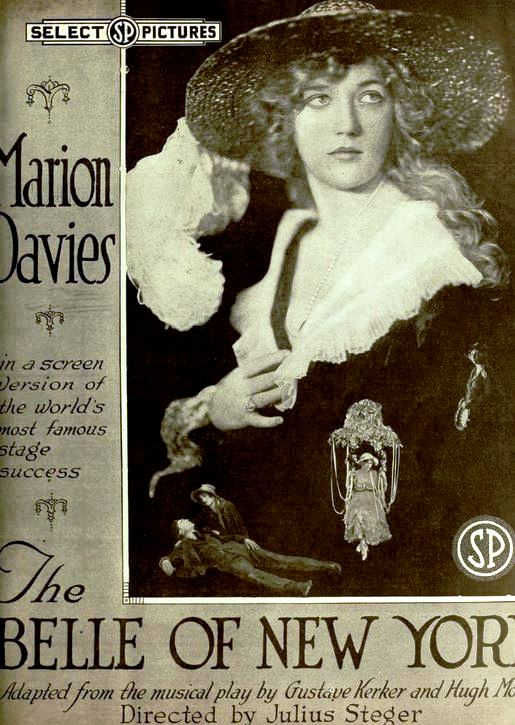
- Directed by: Julius Steger
- Written by: Eugene Walter
- Based on: The Belle of New York; 1897 musical by Hugh Morton and Gustave Kerker
- Produced by: Marion Davies
- Starring: Marion Davies; Etienne Girardot
- Music by: Max Winkler
- Distributed by: Select Pictures
- Release date: February 1919
- Running time: 50 minutes
- Country: United States
- Languages: Silent; English intertitles

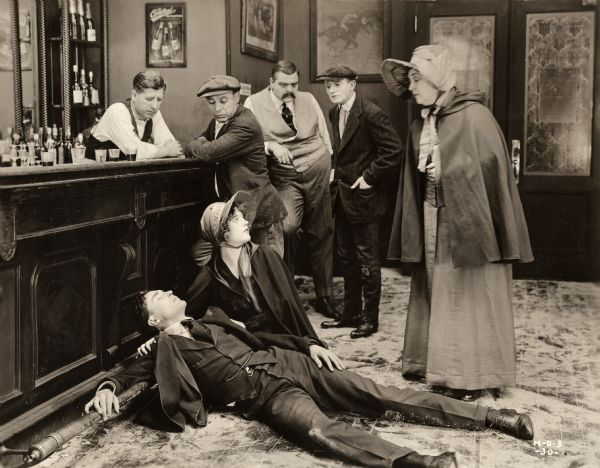
Raymond Bloomer, on floor, assisted by Marion Davies

The Belle of New York is a 1919 silent film directed by Julius Steger and starring Marion Davies.

The 1919 movie was later remade in a 1952 film (The Belle of New York), starring Fred Astaire and Vera-Ellen, with some variations in the plot and setting.

== Background ==
In 1897, The Belle of New York was staged as a Broadway musical comedy.

William Randolph Hearst funded the film to extend his media empire from newspapers into movies. Another motivation was Hearst's ongoing affair with Marion Davies; he was interested in boosting her career by featuring her in "classy" films.

The film touched on several popular themes of the day, including bad guys taking advantage of good guys, family loyalty, romance and heartbreak, dissipation ("drowning your sorrows"), and an ultimate redemption tied to a happy ending. To broaden the film's appeal, director Julius Steger claimed to have "eliminated everything that was sordid or objectionable from the original story... there is nothing that can offend the most cultivated taste."

== Plot summary ==
An old inventor is robbed of his inventions by an evil rich man. When the inventor dies, his daughter Violet goes to New York and joins the "Follies," where she is advertised as "The Belle of New York." The rich man's son is infatuated with Violet and is introduced to her anonymously as Jack. When Violet learns of Jack's identity, she casts him off. He becomes a drunk, and she joins the Salvation Army. Jack is attacked in an underworld saloon just as Violet enters in Salvation Army attire. She nurses him at his home. When Jack's father discovers with whom Jack is in love, he begs forgiveness for the wrong he did Violet's father.

== Cast ==
- Marion Davies as Violet Gray
- Etienne Girardot
- L. Rogers Lytton as Amos Gray
- Franklyn Hanna
- Raymond Bloomer as Jack Bronson
- Christian Rub
- Barbara Sabin as Little Girl
- Nick Thompson as Blinky Bill

== Reception ==
Most print mentions of the film were positive and emphasized the appeal of its female star. Moving Picture World offered a typical summary: "Miss Davies' emotional appeal and tender beauty just suit the slip of a girl who [becomes] the star of a cabaret revue [and] dances herself into popularity and into the hearts of men of every reputation." While the film did not make the list of top-grossing films from 1913-1919 it was widely advertised throughout the country.

== Only partial footage remains ==
The film resides in incomplete form (only two of the original five reels remain) at the Library of Congress

Surviving footage contains rare musical scenes staged on the rooftop stage of the New Amsterdam Theater depicting the Ziegfeld Midnight Frolic show staged by Florenz Ziegfeld Jr. The "Ziegfeld Beauty Chorus" is shown; this chorus consisted of female performers "who encouraged male patrons to use their cigars to pop the balloons covering the majority of their costumes." The Midnight Frolic scene can be viewed here, along with all 18 minutes of the surviving footage.
