= Cora Folsom Salisbury =

American musician and composer (1868–1916)

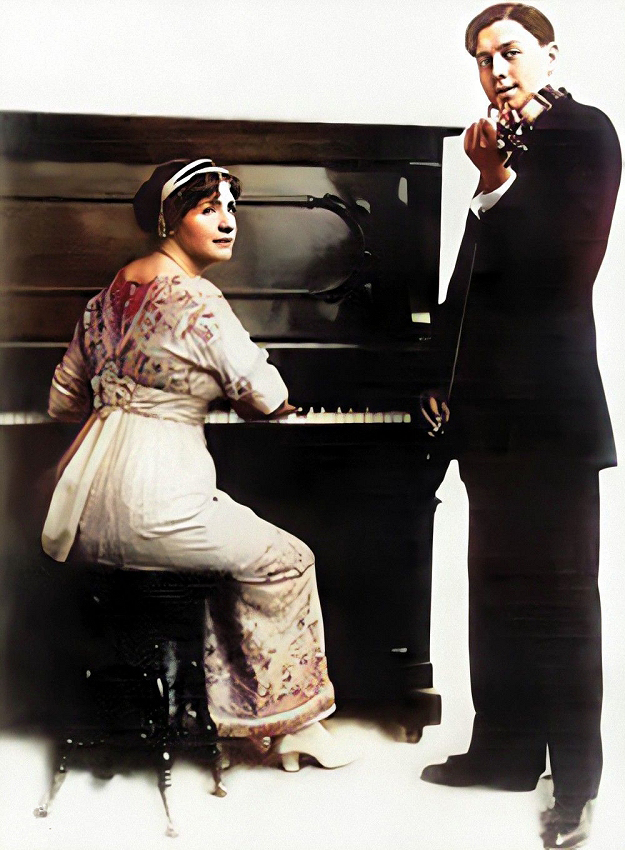
Salisbury and a young Jack Benny

Cora May Folsom Salisbury Aulmann (February 12, 1868 — April 16, 1916), sometimes billed as C. Folsom Salisbury, was an American musician and composer of piano music, including works in the ragtime genre. She was also the first vaudeville partner of violinist Benjamin Kubelsky, later known as comedian Jack Benny.

== Early life ==
Cora May Folsom was born in Oshkosh, Wisconsin, the only child of James Harrison Folsom and Eliza Ann Knofsker Folsom. Her father and his brother ran a sawmill. In widowhood, her mother ran a boarding house. Cora studied piano as a girl.

== Career ==
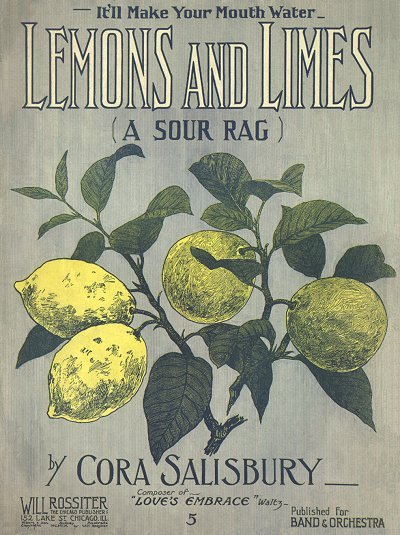
Lemon and Limes - a 1909 rag

After her first marriage ended, Cora Folsom Salisbury helped her mother run boarding houses, tried her hand at sales, and returned to music, earning a living as an accompanist and stage pianist. Around 1907 she started a vaudeville act as a "pianologist" ("pianologue" was her own invented word for piano performance with interspersed comedic observations), and began touring the American midwest and publishing her original compositions. Works published under the name "C. Folsom Salisbury" included Paula (1906, a valse caprice for piano solo, dedicated to Paula Edwardes), Poodles Parade (1907, a march and two-step), My Light Guitar (1908), Lemons and Limes (1909, a ragtime piece), Arbutus Blossoms (1910), Ghost Dance (1911), and Love's Embrace.

She was the house pianist at a theatre in Waukegan, Illinois, when she was not touring. There, in 1909, she met a young violinist who was in the theatre's orchestra. Benny Kubelsky eventually partnered with Cora Folsom Salisbury on tour, as they both had a knack for mixing music and humor. As "Salisbury and Benny" they presented both classical and popular music, along with some of Salisbury's original compositions. The act succeeded enough to play the Palace Theatre in New York City, and launched the show business career of Jack Benny.

== Personal life ==
Cora Folsom married Charles P. Salisbury, a newspaper editor and theatrical manager, in 1888. They divorced in 1903. Cora left performing and touring to care for her mother in 1914. She married again, to a naval officer, George L. Aulmann. Cora's mother died in 1915, and Cora died the next year, aged 48 years. Her remains were buried near her mother's in Oshkosh.
