= Roderic C. Penfield =

American publisher and writer

- Born: December 20, 1864 Monmouth County, New Jersey
- Died: April 2, 1921 (aged 56) Yokohama, Kanagawa, Japan
- Occupation: Journalist; Theatre Critic; Publisher; Screenwriter
- Notable works: Lady Teazle (1904); The White Hen (1907); Ultima Printing Utilities Co.; Trans-Pacific Magazine

Roderic Campbell Penfield (December 20, 1864 – April 2, 1921) was an American publisher, printer, editor, journalist, theatre critic, businessman, playwright, and lyricist. The author of several plays, including both books and lyrics for multiple musicals, two of his stage works were mounted on Broadway: Lady Teazle (1904) and The White Hen (1907). During his varied career in media, he worked as journalist and editor for the New-York Tribune, The Sun, and the New York Evening Mail; also working as a theatre critic for the latter paper. From 1912 to 1914 he was managing editor of Harper's Weekly. Also a businessman with media interests, he was for a time the co-owner of the Asbury Park Press with his brother, Norman W. Penfield. The brother also co-owned the pioneering news photography company, the Pictorial News Company of New York.

As a publisher, Penfield founded the Ultima Printing Utilities Co. in New York City. With that press he founded and served as both publisher and managing editor for the publications The Opera Magazine and The Greenwich Village Spectator. In the last years of his life he worked as a publisher in Japan for the Trans-Pacific Magazine and the World's Salesman; the latter of which he co-founded with his son shortly before his death.

== Life and career ==
Roderic Campbell Penfield was born on December 20, 1864, in Monmouth County, New Jersey. The son of Homer Penfield and Martha Penfield (née Campbell), he began his career in journalism in Red Bank, New Jersey as a reporter for The New Jersey Standard in the early 1880s. By 1883 he was an associate editor with that newspaper. Simultaneously he began working as a publisher, editor, and printer for several other Red Bank publications, such as the advertising magazine Visitor (1881, Red Bank) and the journal The Daily Grand Army Gazette (1883, Red Bank).

Penfield's first significant forays into journalism were done alongside his brother, Norman W. Penfield, with whom he co-established the publishing and editing firm Penfield Bros. In December 1884 the brothers, along with their mother, bought the Asbury Park Press (then known as the Shore Press) from S. T. Hendrickson and W. W. Conover. Over the next several years, Norman worked as the managing editor of the paper, and Roderic as an editor. In 1886 Roderic purchased The New Jersey Standard, and the brothers continued to add more publications to their growing publishing enterprise. The brothers later co-owned the Pictorial News Company of New York; which was a pioneering company in news photography in the first decade of the 20th century.

Penfield was active as both a journalist and editor at a variety of publications in New York City beginning in the 1890s, including the New-York Tribune and The Sun. For fifteen years he was the editor of the weekly edition of the New York Evening Mail; a publication he also worked for as a theatre critic for two years.

In 1912 Penfield left the Evening Mail to become the managing editor of Harper's Weekly; a post he maintained for two years. He founded the Ultima Printing Utilities Co. in New York City and worked as a printer and publisher. That press published several publications founded by Penfield, including The Opera Magazine; a publication for which Penfild served as managing editor from 1914 through 1916 until circumstances during World War I forced the publication to cease. He later founded The Greenwich Village Spectator which published its first issue in April 1917.

In addition to his work as an editor and publisher, Penfield was the author of several plays and wrote the books and lyrics for musicals. Two of his musicals were produced at Broadway's Casino Theatre: Lady Teazle (1904) and The White Hen (1907).

In 1919 Penfield left the United States for Japan; initially taking a position connected with the Japan Advertiser. He then worked in Japan as the publisher of the Trans-Pacific Magazine before co-founding the Yokohama, Japan-based magazine World's Salesman with his son, Roderic Kynett Penfield, shortly before his death at the age of 58.

Penfield died in Yokohama on April 2, 1921.
