= Gustave Kerker =

Prussian-born composer and conductor (1857–1923)

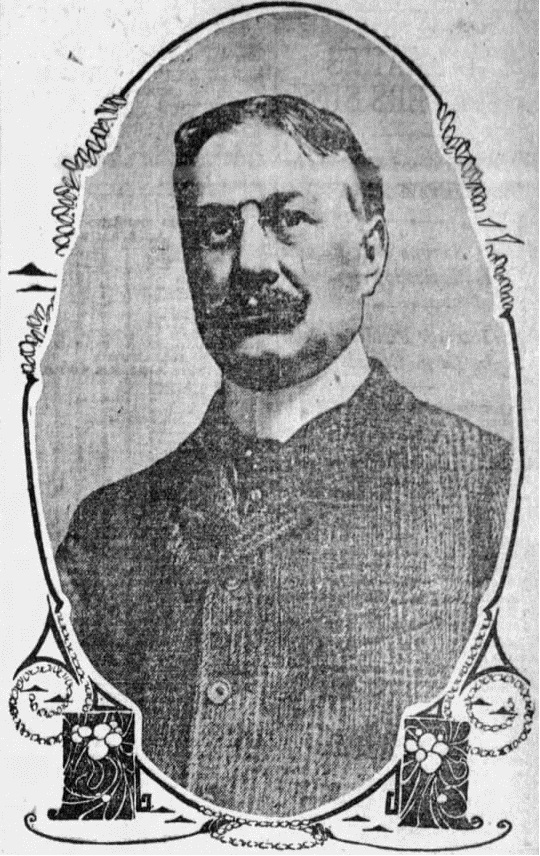
Gustave Kerker

Gustave Adolph Kerker (February 28, 1857 – June 29, 1923), sometimes given as Gustav or Gustavus Kerker, (February 28, 1857 – June 29, 1923) was a Kingdom of Prussia-born composer and conductor who spent most of his life in the United States. He became a musical director for Broadway theatre productions and wrote the music for a series of operettas and musicals produced on Broadway and in the West End. His most famous musical was The Belle of New York (1897).

== Life and career ==
Kerker was born in Herford, Kingdom of Prussia, and began to study the cello at the age of seven. His family emigrated to the U.S. in 1867, settling in Louisville, Kentucky. Kerker played in pit orchestras at local theatres and then began to conduct. His early operetta, Cadets, toured the South in 1879. Kerker then moved to New York City, where he was engaged as the principal conductor at the Casino Theatre. There, he began to add his own songs into the scores of foreign operettas, notably Charles Lecocq's The Pearl of Pekin, since these works had no effective copyright in the U.S.

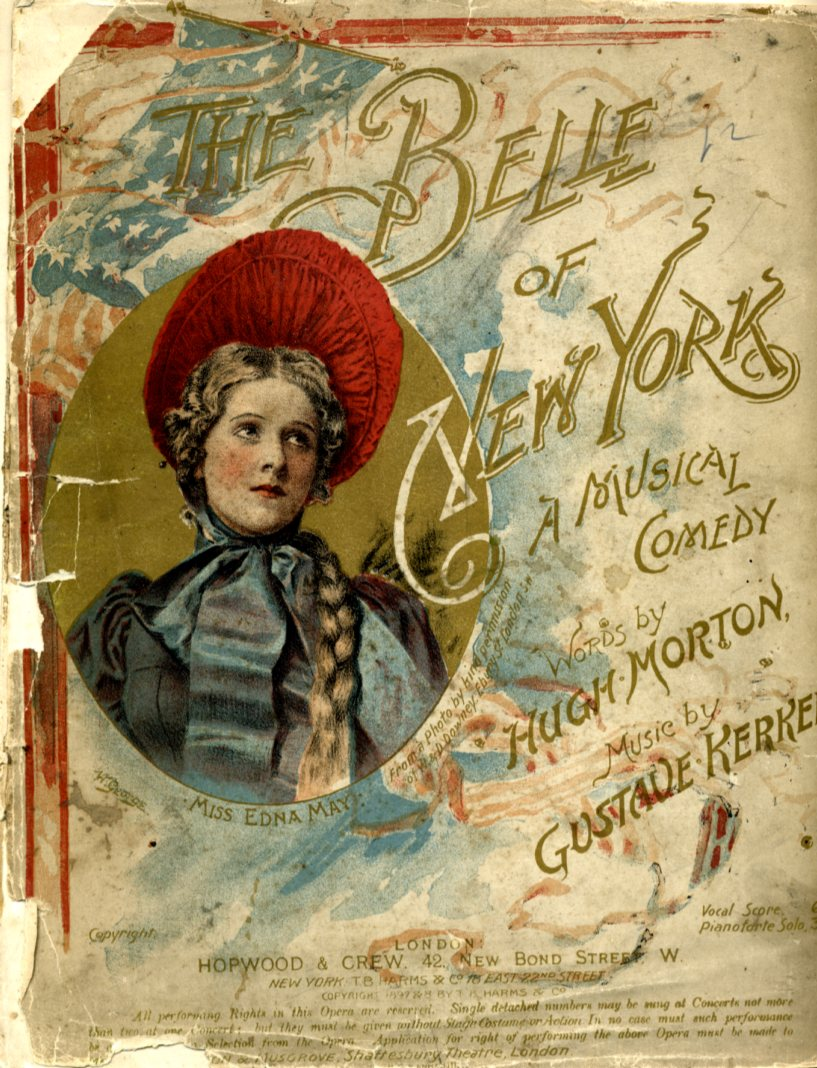
Vocal score

Kerker's first complete operetta in New York was Castles in the Air in 1890. He wrote over 20 shows, the most successful of which were the London musical burlesque Little Christopher Columbus (1893), and the international musical hit The Belle of New York (1897). Other notable musicals included An American Beauty (1896), The Girl from Up There (1901), Winsome Winnie (1903), The Tourists (1906), The White Hen (1907), and Fascinating Flora (1907) to a book by R. H. Burnside and Joseph W. Herbert. In 1909, he was asked to leave Germany by authorities for having failed to perform military service in his youth.

He was one of the nine founding members of ASCAP in 1914.

Kerker was married twice: first to Rose Keene whose stage name was Rose Leighton (married 1884) and second to Mattie B. Rivenberg (June 5, 1908), a show girl in the musical Nearly a Hero who was 30 years his junior.

Kerker died following an "attack of apoplexy" at his home on 565 West 169th Street in New York City at the age of 66.

== Theater credits ==
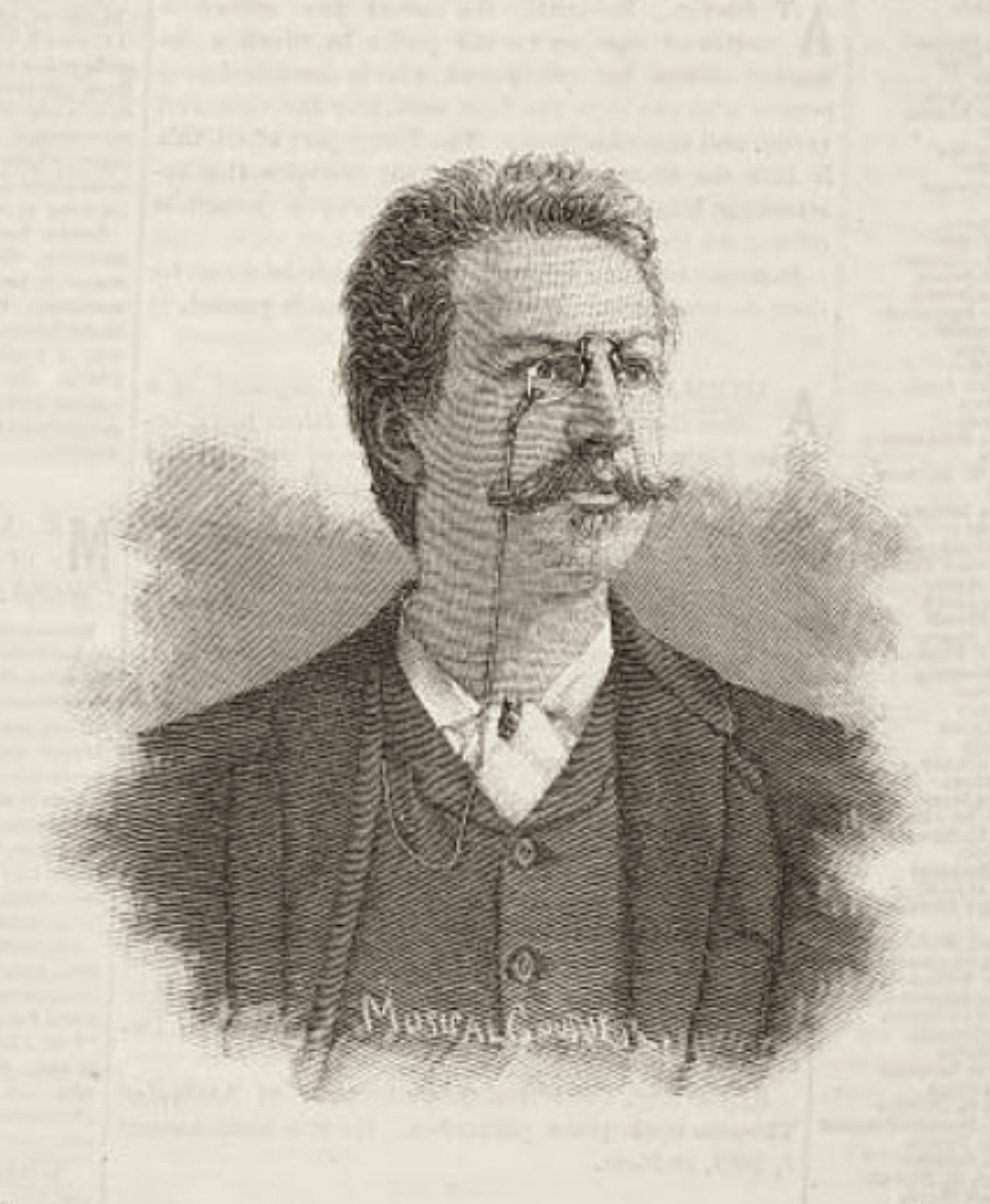
1890 sketch of Kerker

- 1879 - The Cadets
- 1888 - Pearl of Pekin (libretto by Charles Alfred Byrne)
- 1890 - Castles in the Air (libretto by Byrne)
- 1893 - Little Christopher Columbus, with Ivan Caryll, libretto by George Robert Sims and Cecil Raleigh
- 1894 - Prince Kam or A Trip to Venus (libretto by Byrne and Louis Harrison)
- 1895 - Kismet or Two Tangled Turks (libretto by Richard F. Carroll)
- 1896
  - In Gay New York (musical revue; libretto by Hugh Morton
  - The Lady Slavey (libretto by George Dance; lyrics by Morton)
  - An American Beauty (libretto by Morton)
- 1897
  - The Whirl of the Town (musical revue; libretto by Morton)
  - The Belle of New York (libretto by Morton)
- 1898
  - My Estelle (libretto by Morton)
  - Yankee Doodle Dandy (libretto by Morton)
  - The Telephone Girl (libretto by Morton)
- 1899 – The Man in the Moon (with Ludwig Engländer and Reginald De Koven)
- 1901 - The Girl from Up There (libretto by Morton)
- 1902 - The Billionaire (libretto by Harry B. Smith)
- 1903
  - "The Lobster Song (I Was Walking 'Round the Ocean)" in The Wizard of Oz (libretto by Morton)
  - Winsome Winnie (contributor; libretto by Edward Jakobowski; most of the music by Harry Paulton)
- 1904
  - Burning to Sing, or Singing to Burn. A 'Very' Grand Opera (libretto by R. H. Burnside)
- 1906
  - The Social Whirl (libretto by Charles Doty and Joseph W. Herbert; lyrics by Herbert)
  - The Tourists (libretto by R. H. Burnside)
- 1907
  - The White Hen (libretto by Roderic C. Penfield; lyrics by Penfield and Paul West)
  - Fascinating Flora (libretto by Burnside and Herbert)
- 1909
  - Die oberen Zehntausend (libretto by Julius Freund)
- 1912 – Two Little Brides (libretto by Arthur Anderson and Harold Atteridge)
- 1921 – The Whirl of New York, based on The Belle of New York (libretto by Morton and Edgar Smith.
