= The Belle of New York (1952 film) =

1952 film by Charles Walters

- Theatrical release poster
- Directed by: Charles Walters
- Screenplay by: Robert O'Brien; Irving Elinson
- Based on: The Belle of New York; 1897 musical by Hugh Morton and Gustave Kerker
- Produced by: Arthur Freed
- Starring: Fred Astaire; Vera-Ellen; Marjorie Main; Keenan Wynn
- Cinematography: Robert H. Planck
- Edited by: Albert Akst
- Music by: Alexander Courage; Adolph Deutsch; Conrad Salinger
- Color process: Technicolor
- Distributed by: Metro-Goldwyn-Mayer
- Release date: March 5, 1952 (New York)
- Running time: 82 minutes
- Country: United States
- Language: English
- Budget: $2,563,000
- Box office: $1,982,000

The Belle of New York is a 1952 musical comedy film directed by Charles Walters and starring Fred Astaire, Vera-Ellen, Alice Pearce, Marjorie Main, Gale Robbins and Keenan Wynn, with music by Harry Warren and lyrics by Johnny Mercer.

== Plot ==
In New York at the dawn of the 20th century, Angela Collins is known as the "Belle of New York" and attracts attention for her beauty and singing. Her wealthy matron Mrs. Phineas Hill believes that Angela's singing is a distraction. Mrs. Hill's playboy nephew Charlie is engaged to sharpshooter Dixie "Deadshot" McCoy, although he does not want to marry her.

Charlie falls in love with Angela, but she tells him that if he were really in love, he would walk on air. He imagines himself dancing in midair and later on top of the Washington Square Arch. The next morning, Dixie storms into the Hills' mansion, distraught that Charlie did not arrive at his wedding. Mrs. Hill writes Dixie a $10,000 check to keep her quiet.

Charlie arrives at Angela's office and asks to join her temperance movement. Angela is skeptical and asks him to complete an honest day's work before joining. Charlie is unsuccessful at keeping a job, as he is fired every time that he sees Angela in her office. By nighttime, Charlie works as a streetcar driver, and at the end of the day, he offers Angela a ride to the streetcar depot. He observes that her feet have left the ground and returns home to inform his aunt that he is love with Angela. Delighted at the news, Mrs. Hill agrees to pay for the wedding.

The night before the wedding, Angela's friend Elsie Wilkins holds rehearsals while decorations are being made. Elsewhere, Charlie holds to his sobriety, refusing to drink a toast for his upcoming wedding before finally indulging. When he awakens the next morning, he realizes that he is about to miss the wedding. He returns home to find Angela in her wedding gown. He apologizes and cancels the wedding, believing that she deserves a better man. Angela insists on proceeding with the wedding, but when she kisses Charlie, she does not levitate.

Charlie later approaches Elsie during a temperance march. Angela hides while Charlie inquires about her location. Elsie lies, claiming that Angela has left the movement. When Charlie leaves, Elsie suggests to Angela that she should reunite with him. The women visit a casino where Charlie works as a singing waiter. After Charlie performs a number, a male diner asks him to hand Angela a note. Angela reads the note and leaves, and Charlie then reads it and punches the diner. A brawl erupts just as Mrs. Hill arrives. As they attempt to sneak away, Charlie confronts Angela, and as they are walking outside, they begin to levitate again. A crowd gathers outside and cheers, and Charlie and Angela marry and dance in midair.

== Cast ==
- Fred Astaire as Charlie Hill
- Vera-Ellen as Angela Bonfils
- Marjorie Main as Mrs. Phineas Hill
- Keenan Wynn as Max Ferris
- Alice Pearce as Elsie Wilkins
- Clinton Sundberg as Gilford Spivak
- Gale Robbins as Dixie 'Deadshot' McCoy

== Production ==
The Belle of New York originated as a 1897 musical written by Hugh Morton and Gustave Kerker. It was adapted into a silent film released in 1919, which starred Marion Davies. MGM acquired the film rights in 1943 for $77,000 (equivalent to nearly $1.5 million in 2026) to the copyright holders. By 1945, Arthur Freed had placed the project on his production schedule. At the time, Fred Astaire was reluctant to star in the film and retired in 1946 after completing Blue Skies at Paramount Pictures. However, Astaire promised Freed he would star in The Belle of New York should he ever come out of his retirement. At one point, Judy Garland was meant to co-star with Astaire before she dropped out during rehearsals. Marge and Gower Champion, a husband-and-wife dancing team, were once announced as the leads but Freed instead paired Astaire and Vera-Ellen.

For the part of the aunt Mrs. Hill, Roger Edens suggested Fifi D'Orsay while director Charles Walters wanted Mae West, but she wanted too much money. Instead, the role went to Marjorie Main. Alice Pearce and Clinton Sundberg were cast as Vera-Ellen's fellow mission workers. Walters also cast Gale Robbins as Dixie 'Deadshot' McCoy and his friend Keenan Wynn as Astaire's lawyer Max Ferris.

To enhance the story, Freed decided to set the film during the turn of the century, with the timeframe split throughout the four seasons and stylized after the Currier and Ives paintings. To compose new music for the film, Freed first asked Rodgers and Hammerstein. Instead, Freed hired Harry Warren and Johnny Mercer, who composed eight new songs for the film.

Principal photography began on June 18, 1951, which incidentally was the same day Singin' in the Rain (1952) went into production. A horseshoe made of hundreds of flowers arrived on set with "Good Luck" wishes from that film's directors Gene Kelly and Stanley Donen. During the musical number "Seeing's Believing," which shows Astaire dancing atop of the Washington Square Arch, Jack Martin Smith, the film's art director, explained: "...we did it against a blue backing. We also painted the floor and the sides of the building blue as well. And to have him jump from cornice to cornice, I used springboards, landing mats and trampolines." Astaire however was unsatisfied with the final result.

During production, Walters requested a sabbatical from further filming when he agreed to direct Garland in her first appearance at the Palace Theatre in Manhattan. With Freed's permission, the production was closed for eight days from August 17 to 26, 1951. Principal photography wrapped on October 3.

== Music ==
- "When I'm Out with the Belle of New York": The film's signature waltz is delivered by a male chorus outside Vera-Ellen's window.
- "Who Wants to Kiss the Bridegroom": Astaire sings and dances with seven women in sequence, finishing the routine on a table.
- "Let a Little Love Come In": Alice Pearce and Vera-Ellen (dubbed by Anita Ellis) each sing the song.
- "Seeing's Believing": Astaire sings and dances atop a replica of the Washington Square Arch.
- "Baby Doll": This romantic duet with gentle comic overtones is sung by Astaire and danced by Astaire and Vera-Ellen.
- "Oops": This comic dance duet is sung by Astaire in and around a moving horse-drawn streetcar.
- "A Bride's Wedding-Day Song (Thank You Mister Currier, Thank You Mister Ives)": Astaire and Vera-Ellen sing the song as a duet.
- "Naughty but Nice": Vera-Ellen sings (dubbed by Ellis) and dances.
- "I Wanna Be a Dancin' Man": Astaire's second solo routine is a song and sand dance.

== Reception ==
=== Box office ===
According to MGM records, The Belle of New York earned $1,340,000 in the U.S. and Canada and $642,000 elsewhere, resulting in a loss of $1,576,000.

=== Critical reaction ===
Bosley Crowther of The New York Times wrote:

Add to the list of young ladies who have danced on the screen with Fred Astaire the name of Vera-Ellen and mark it with a star. For this agile and twinkling charmer, who accompanies the ageless Mr. A. in his latest if not his greatest Metro musical, ''The Belle of New York," is as graceful and pleasing a dancer as any that has gone before, and she adds a considerable presence to this trifle ... And, believe us, a presence is needed in addition to that of Mr. A., for little of any marked distinction is in evidence outside the two stars. ... If it weren't for them and their dancing, "The Belle of New York" would be kaput. As it is, the two nimble performers have just about all they can do to keep this slight musical moving for the brief hour and twenty minutes that it runs. Somehow the script ... is so thin and dramatically boneless that it couldn't possibly move from here to there on the strength of the trifling complications with which it is barely endowed ... Director Charles Walters desperately calls upon his stars to remedy the vast emaciation with the frequent use of their muscular limbs, to which enterprise of salvation they apply themselves with a will."

William Brogdon of Variety wrote: "A film musical usually can get by with the lightest plot if the dance numbers and tunes are sock, but Belle has an even lighter plot than usual, and the numbers are just ordinary. It's all done pleasantly but not of a quality that rates more than passing interest." Harrison's Reports wrote: "Despite the fine Technicolor photography and the usual lavish MGM production values, this musical leaves much to be desired and will have to depend on the drawing power of the players. The story, which is set in the gaslight era, is extremely thin and lifeless, though it serves well enough as a framework for the musical interludes."

In his 1959 autobiography, Astaire noted the film's critics had accused the film's story as being "thin", which reminded him of Noël Coward's retort: "Very well—from now on I will write nothing but very fat plays for very fat critics."

== Bibliography ==
- Astaire, Fred (1959). Steps in Time. New York: Harper & Brothers. pp. 299–300.
- Fordin, Hugh (1996) [1975]. M-G-M's Greatest Musicals: The Arthur Freed Unit. New York: Da Capo Press. ISBN 978-0-306-80730-5.
- Freedland, Michael (1976). Fred Astaire: An Illustrated Biography. Grosset & Dunlap. ISBN 0-448-14080-2.
- Phillips, Brent (2014). Charles Walters: The Director Who Made Hollywood Dance. University Press of Kentucky. ISBN 978-0-8131-4723-9.
