= Mirror Films =

Historic film-producing company

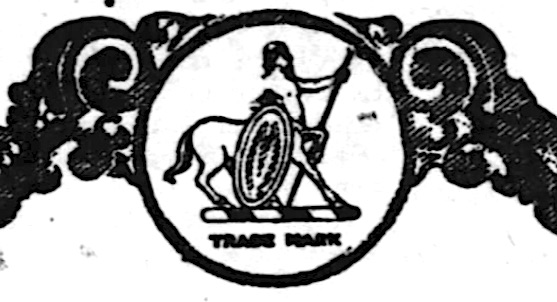
Mirror Films logo

Mirror Films Incorporated was a short-lived motion picture company producing films from late 1915 to early 1917. Their stated purpose was to bring business practices to bear on motion picture production in order to make a profit, to "look upon film...as so much canned product".

== Company Founding ==
Mirror Films Inc. was incorporated on September 23, 1915. Founders included Clifford Harmon, W.C. Toomey, Frank Hastings (treasurer), Abraham Archibald Anderson, Richard G. Hollaman, Harry Rowe Shelley, John W. Houston, Joseph Howland Hunt (brother/partner of Richard Howland Hunt), Andres de Segurola, and others. Captain Harry Lambart, formerly a director at Vitagraph, was retained as director-general in charge of productions. The company's offices were located at 16 East 42nd Street in New York City.

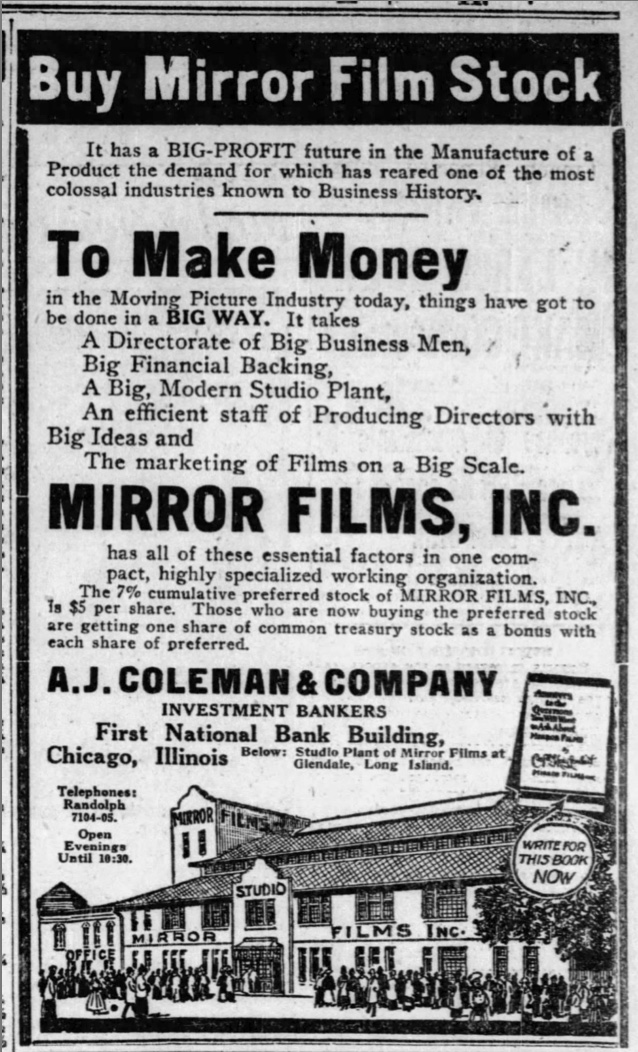
Mirror Films stock advertisement.

Formation of the company was announced in October 1915. This was followed by an extensive print advertising campaign to raise capital through sales of stock in the company. Approximately $500,000 of preferred stock and $2,000,000 of regular stock shares were issued at a price of $5 per share. The company was reported to have raised at least $300,000 and likely in excess of $500,000, though it did not raise the full $2,500,000 amount of the stock issue despite some reports.

Concurrent with the stock offering, Mirror also issued a number of publicity press releases to gossip and movie columns throughout the country, announcing the company had retained services of various directors, writers, and actors and was building several production facilities. Actors mentioned included Nat Goodwin, William "Billy" Quirk, Margaret Greene, Flora Finch, Ione Bright, and Estelle Mardo; directors/writers included Lawrence Marston, Walter McNamara, Opie Read, and Beta Breuil. Also attached to the company was Carl von Hoffman as cinematographer for various Mirror films.

== Film Production ==
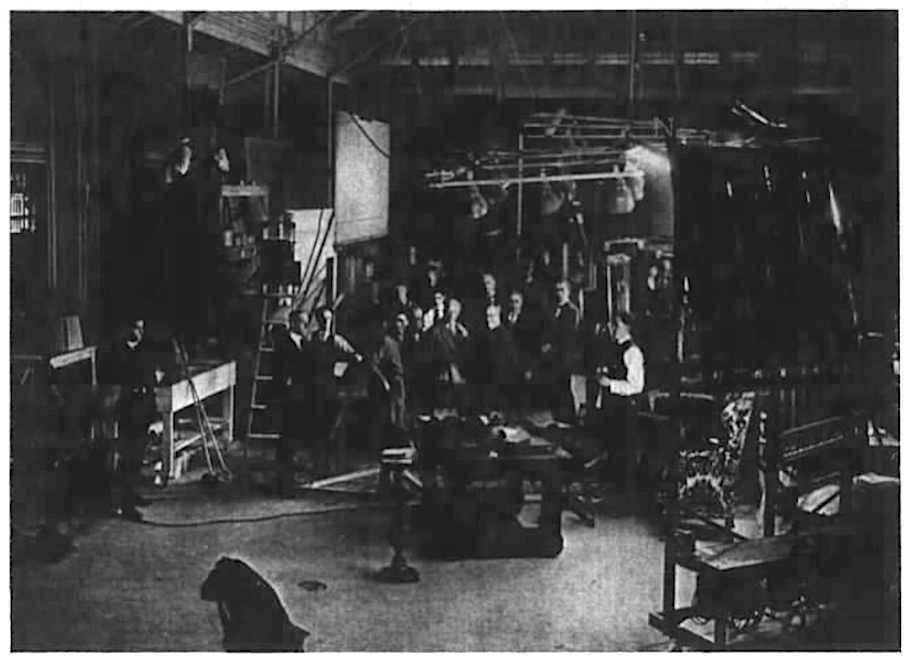
Film production at Mirror Films Glendale studio.

In January/February 1916 Mirror announced that several films were in production; no titles were initially associated with the films. This was followed in the spring of 1916 by more publicity press releases mentioning the activities of various actors in relation to Mirror. The company purchased a casino/dance hall in Glendale, Queens, New York for conversion to a studio for film production, as well as using facilities available in Jacksonville, Florida. Clifford Harmon subsequently orchestrated a land deal to expand production facilities in Glendale for $150,000.

=== The Marriage Bond ===
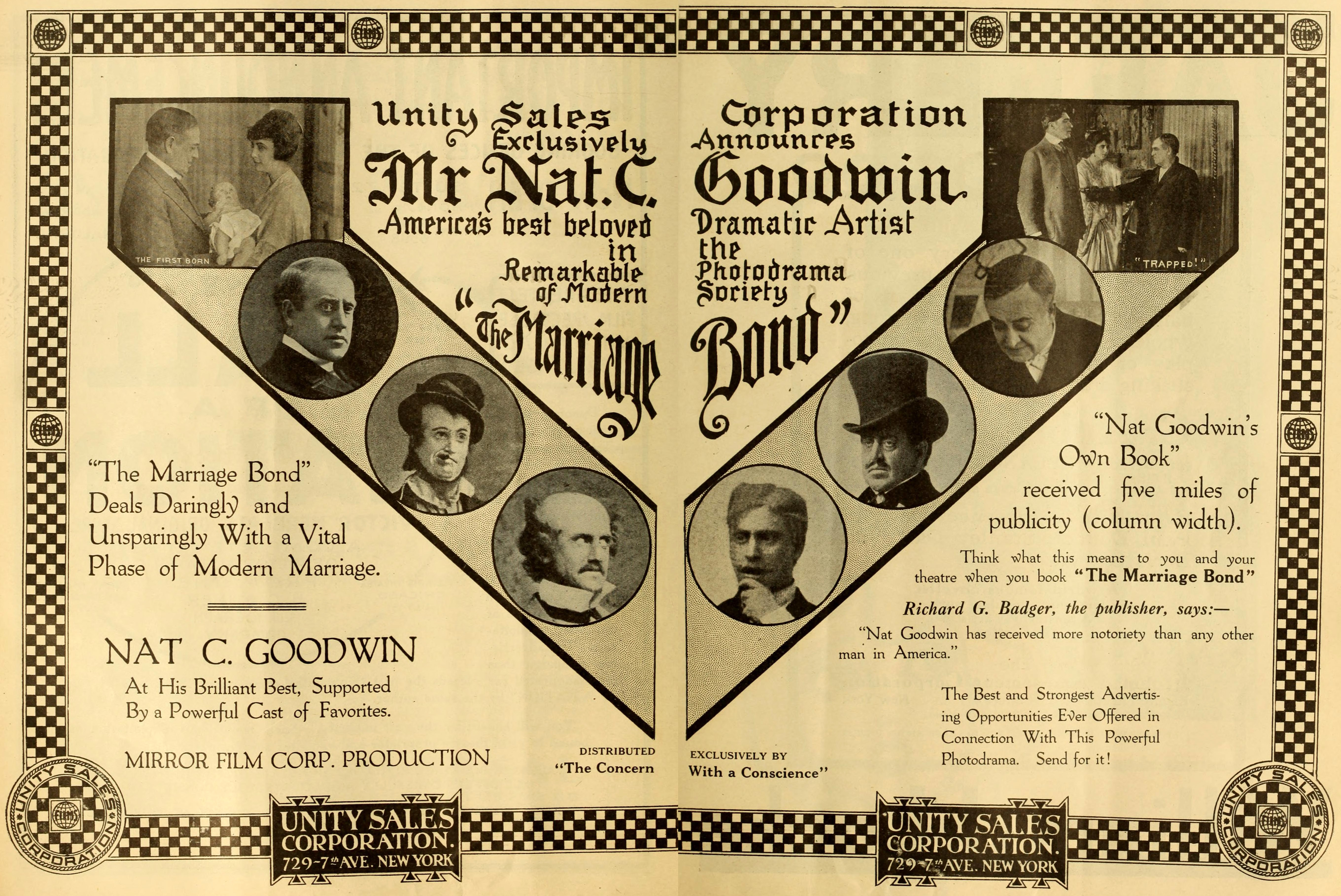
Advertisement for The Marriage Bond

Mirror began production of The Marriage Bond (lost film) in February 1916, filming in Glendale, NY. The film was a 5-reel motion picture and starred Nat Goodwin and Margaret Greene. Also in the cast were Raymond Bloomer, Anne Jeffson, P.J. Rollow, and Loel Steuart; Lawrence Marston directed. The film was released in July 1916 by Unity Sales Corporation.

=== Turned Up ===
Mirror began production of Turned Up (a 5-reel motion picture, version of a Mark Melford farce) in February 1916 in Jacksonville and Palm Beach, Florida. Additional filming in Glendale followed in March 1916. The film starred Nat Goodwin with Flora Finch, William "Billy" Quirk, Augustus Phillips, and Estelle Mardo. Walter McNamara directed, with a screenplay by Adrian Johnson.

Mirror reportedly sent a total of 40 actors and stage personnel to produce the picture. The film went significantly over-budget due to various issues, some of which were of significance in the trial resulting from a 1916 Nat Goodwin lawsuit against Mirror. There is no evidence to indicate the film was ever released.

=== A Wall Street Tragedy ===
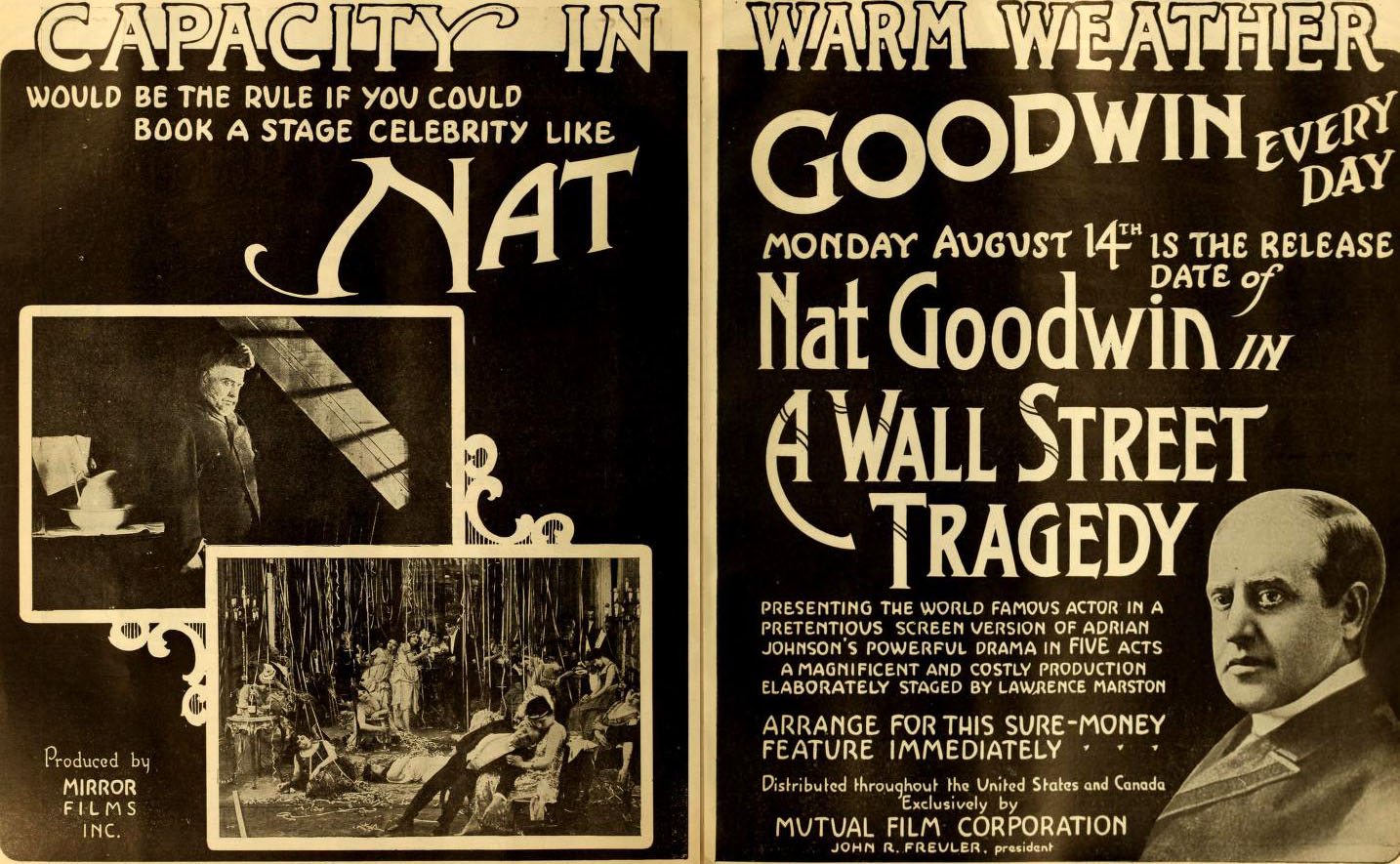
Advertisement for A Wall Street Tragedy

The Mirror production of A Wall Street Tragedy (lost film) was filmed in April 1916. Lawrence Marston once again directed, and the film starred Nat Goodwin and Zola Telmzart. The film was released by Mutual Film Corporation.

=== The Lions Mail ===
The Lions Mail began filming in May 1916. Nat Goodwin and Henry Carville starred; the film was directed by Frank S. Beresford. Some filming occurred on location in Quebec. The film may not have been completed, as Mirror reportedly ran out of money during filming and the studio ceased operations.

=== Related Activities ===
During this period, Mirror also participated in the 1916 Screen Club Ball at Madison Square Garden; attendees included Clifford Harmon, other Mirror executives, Nat Goodwin, Billy Quirk, Ione Bright, and Margaret Greene. The Glendale studio also fielded an amateur softball team which competed in local community leagues during 1916.

== Financial difficulties, legal troubles, and dissolution ==
The company began to evidence troubles as early as February 1916, with the departure of Captain Harry Lambart. This was followed by mentions in various newspapers that Mirror was experiencing difficulties and that it had effectively run out of cash to operate. Multiple breach of contract lawsuits were soon filed against the company for failure to make good on promised salaries.

By February 1917, W.C. Toomey had left the company, taking a position with Mutual Films, for whom he had worked previously.

=== Nat Goodwin lawsuit ===
Nat Goodwin filed a breach-of-contract lawsuit against Mirror Films in late May 1916, alleging he was owed more than $15,000 in back wages. Legal wrangling in the case continued until the case was heard by the New York State Supreme Court in March 1918. The lawsuit resulted in the seizure of Mirror's Glendale studio in June 1916, though Mirror executives secured a bond to re-open the studio and disputed the effect the seizure had on production.

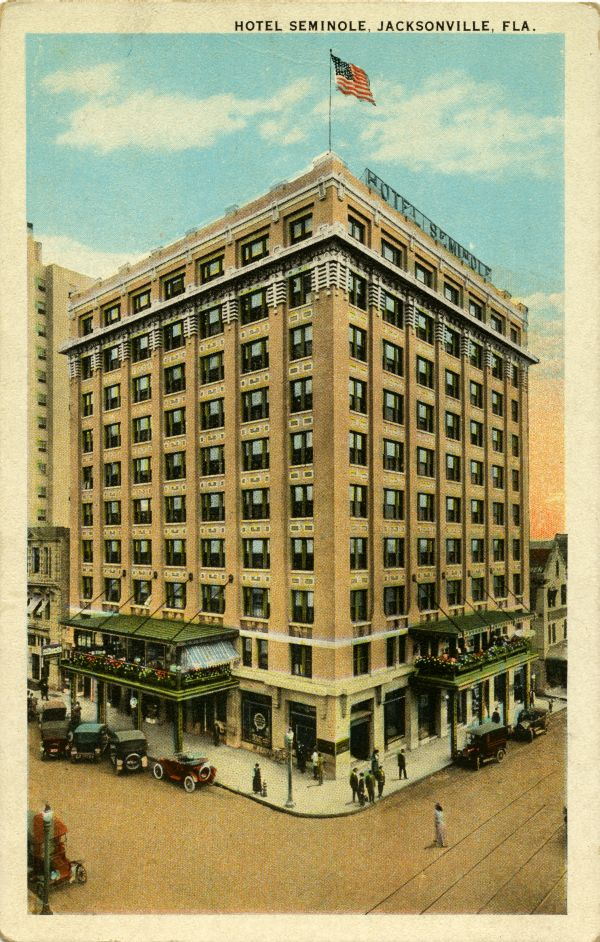
Seminole Hotel in Jacksonville, Florida. Figured prominently in Nat Goodwin lawsuit trial.

The jury trial was an acrimonious one, and was extensively covered in the newspapers. In the trial, lawyers for Mirror Films extensively questioned the character of Nat Goodwin; accusations of drunkenness, sloth, contentious and diva-like behavior on/off the set (at the filming locations in Florida and New York as well as the Seminole Hotel in Jacksonville), and outright refusal to work were offered in an effort to prove that Goodwin had been fired with just cause. Goodwin and his lawyers countered with their own witnesses and evidence that Harmon had admitted on various occasions that the company had run out of operating capital and was unable to pay the agreed-upon salary. Witnesses included Clifford Harmon, W.C. Toomey, directors Lawrence Marston and Walter McNamara, Goodwin's wife Margaret, as well as members of the film crew and personal assistants for Goodwin.

In May 1918, Nat Goodwin was awarded $15,374. Further appeals by Mirror delayed payment of the award; Goodwin was forced to sue the surety company which was holding the bond from Mirror that was used to reopen the studio. The suit was still in litigation when Goodwin died in January 1919.

By 1919, no securities information on Mirror Films Inc. was available, and the company was effectively insolvent and out of business.
