= Clifford B. Harmon =

American real estate developer

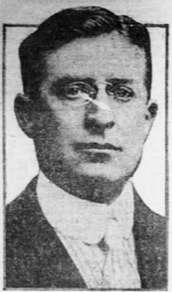
- Born: July 1, 1866; Urbana, OH
- Died: June 25, 1945 (aged 78); Cannes, FR
- Occupations: Real-estate developer, amateur aviator

Clifford Burke Harmon (July 1, 1866 – June 25, 1945) was a wealthy American real estate developer and founding partner of Wood, Harmon & Co., as well as a noted early amateur aviator.

== Early life ==
Clifford Burke Harmon was born on July 1, 1866, in Urbana, Ohio, the youngest child of William R. and Mary Wood ("Molly") Harmon. He had one older brother, William Elmer Harmon, born in 1862. His father William R. Harmon fought in the Civil War with the 70th Ohio Volunteers and later served as an officer with the "Buffalo Soldiers".

Harmon grew up in Lebanon, Ohio, attending the local public schools. In 1884 his mother died, followed by his father 6 months later.

== Real estate success ==
In 1887, Harmon's brother William approached him and his uncle Charles Wood with a business proposition. William had determined that there was money to be made by providing a way by which people interested in owning a home could purchase one in installments, making a small down payment and paying what they could monthly. This "Easy Pay Plan" opened the possibility of home and land ownership to large groups who might not otherwise be able to do so. Harmon and his uncle both liked the idea; together they pooled a total of $3000 to start Wood, Harmon & Co.

Their first development was near Loveland, Ohio, and consisted of 200 lots. With some well-crafted advertising, the development sold out in 4 days. Further developments were soon built in Ohio and western Pennsylvania, followed by expansion into various cities in the Midwest and the East Coast of the United States. Harmon relocated to Pittsburgh around 1891, then to Philadelphia in 1895. Wood, Harmon & Co. soon had offices in over 26 cities.

In 1900 Wood, Harmon & Co, purchased large tracts of land in Brooklyn, New York, in anticipation that the building of the Brooklyn Bridge and expansion of the city's rail transit would provide opportunities for the company. The bet on this expansion proved to be fortuitous, with the company ultimately developing over 20,000 building lots in Brooklyn. Wood, Harmon & Co. also diversified by creating other companies to acquire and hold business properties and real estate for lease and/or sale.

In 1907, disagreements between the partners resulted in the dissolution of Wood, Harmon, & Co., with Clifford Harmon forming his own development company. Harmon had already taken the lead in developing several properties in the New York metropolitan area, notably Pelhamwood starting around 1909 and continuing to develop Harmon-on-Hudson (now part of Croton-on-Hudson), initially developed in 1903 as an artists colony. He also continued with real-estate development in other cities such as Philadelphia, such as the development of Penfield in Haverford, and Louisville, Kentucky. The Clifford B. Harmon & Co. continued to advertise until around 1930, after which the firm presumably closed.

== Early aviation and other pursuits ==
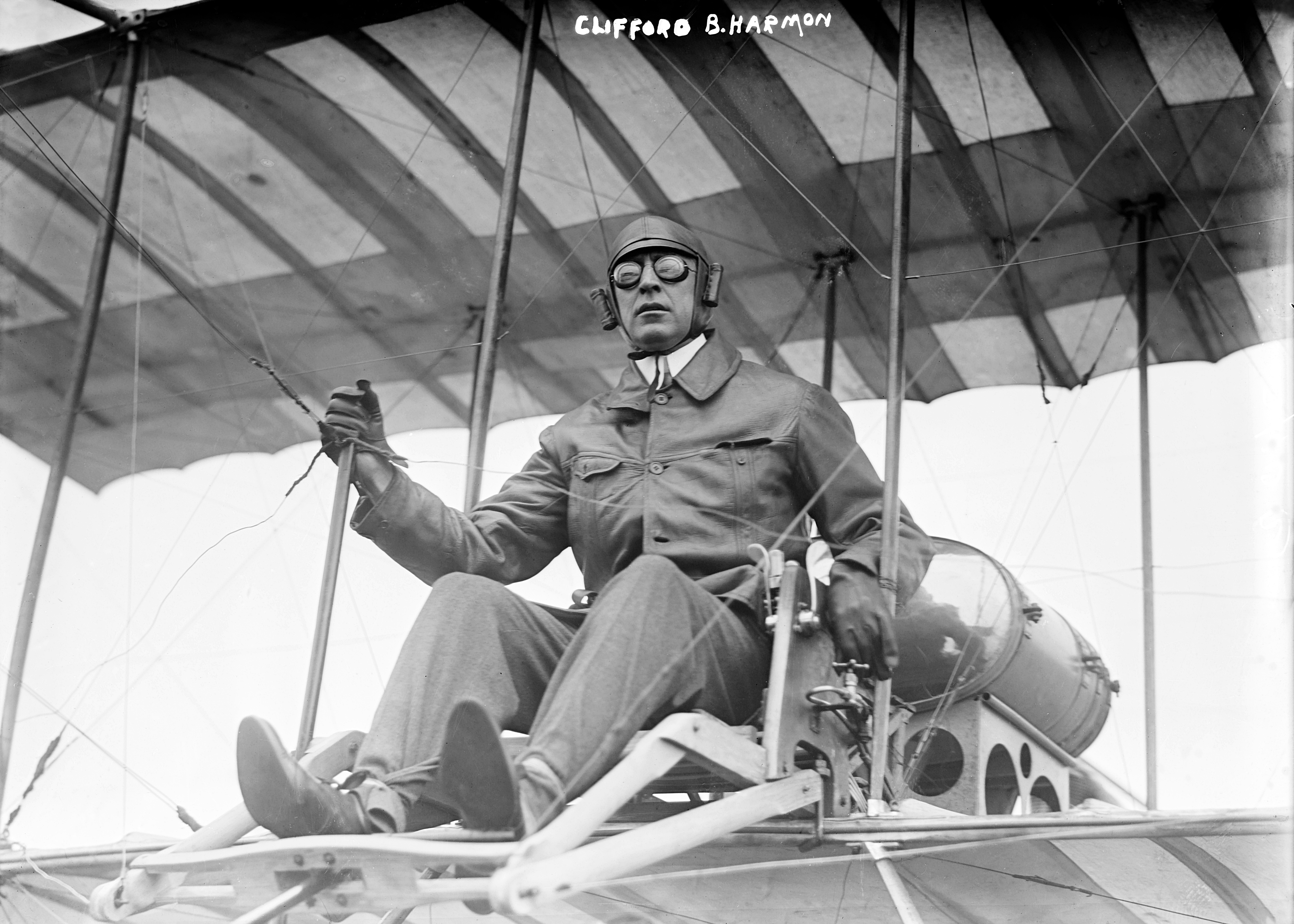
Harmon seated in a Farman III biplane

Harmon was known for his love of automobile racing, yachting, horses, and other pursuits. In 1908 he learned to fly in approximately one week, and was awarded the sixth pilot's license issued in the United States. He was involved with both ballooning and airplanes; in 1908 he set a record for time aloft in the Indianapolis balloon race. In 1909 Harmon participated in several balloon races; he again participated in the June Indianapolis balloon race, with A. Holland Forbes; his balloon was fired upon at night traveling over Morgan County, Alabama. In September 1909 he was the subject of a large search when he flew solo over western Massachusetts and lost contact with those on the ground; Harmon landed safely and returned to city via car and train.

In October 1909 at the St. Louis Centennial balloon race Harmon again set a flight duration record of 48 hours 26 minutes as well as an altitude record of 24,000 feet in his gas balloon New York. Later in October he was a witness for a Wilbur Wright flight of 27 minutes (the longest at a government aerodrome at the time).

Harmon began 1910 by attending Aviation Week in Los Angeles, California, bringing a Curtiss aircraft and a balloon; while there he conducted a number of balloon flights with passengers. In March 1910 he attempted a balloon flight from San Antonio, Texas to New York, but was brought down early by weather. In July 1910 he set an American endurance record for airplane flight in Boston, staying aloft 3 hours 3 minutes 30 seconds; the record was broken in September. Later in July Harmon made an attempt to fly across the Long Island Sound, but crashed when his Farman III biplane lost power; he was not seriously injured. By August 1910 Harmon had added two French Bleriot monoplanes to his collection.

On August 20, 1910, Harmon became the first man to fly across the Long Island Sound, flying from Garden City, Long Island, New York to Greenwich, Connecticut. Harmon attempted to land on the property of his father-in-law E.C. Benedict but could not locate it in the fading light of the day, instead landing nearby. On landing he hit a patch of rough grass which broke the chassis of the airplane. For the flight, Harmon was awarded the Doubleday-Page Trophy.

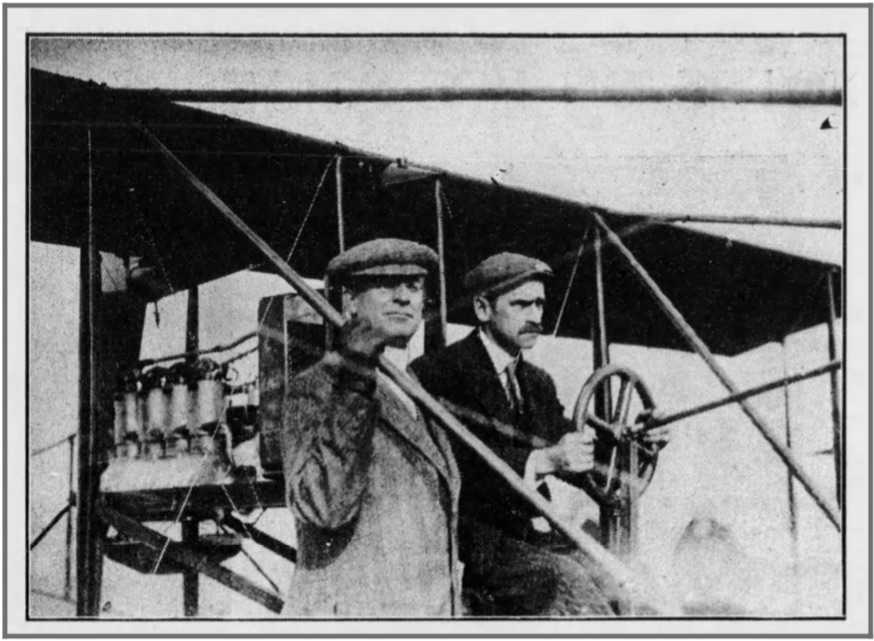
Harmon and Glenn Curtiss, 1910

In September 1910 Harmon won the Harvard cup at the Boston Aviation Meet; he competed in a bomb-throwing target contest and other events as an amateur aviator. He also was involved in another wreck of his Farman biplane but again was not seriously injured. In October 1910 Harmon participated in an aviation demonstration with Claude Grahame-White in Washington DC; later in October Harmon also set an unofficial altitude record of 24,200 ft in a balloon.

In May 1911 Harmon went to Europe to arrange for American aviators to participate in an International Aviation Meet at Belmont Park; in July he participated in a balloon race from Kansas City, Missouri, to qualify for Gordon Bennett Cup race but was forced from race when his balloon was caught in a severe thunderstorm. In December 1911 he announced retirement from balloon racing and airplanes at the behest of his wife, father-in-law, and various business associates.

Harmon returned to flight in November 1913 while spending time in England, participating in a flight from London to Paris with Claude Grahame-White. In April 1915 he, along with several other aviators and wealthy friends, participated in a scheme to commute regularly from New York to points at the eastern end of Long Island by airplane.

After moving to Paris in the early 1920s, Harmon became an advocate for various aviation causes. In December 1924 he offered to replace the Gordon Bennett Cup after it had been won by Belgium; the following year he proposed a memorial in Paris to Lafayette Escadrille aviators; the model for the monument became the Harmon Trophy for aviation. In 1926 Harmon founded and financed the International League of Aviators (Ligue Internationale des Aviateurs), followed by a promotional tour of Europe financed by the King of Belgium and using a Caproni bomber on loan from the Italian Air Force.

In May 1927 Harmon was on hand for Charles Lindbergh's arrival in Paris; Harmon met Lindbergh during post-flight receptions. In June, Harmon installed a plaque commemorating Lindbergh at Le Bourget airport in Paris.

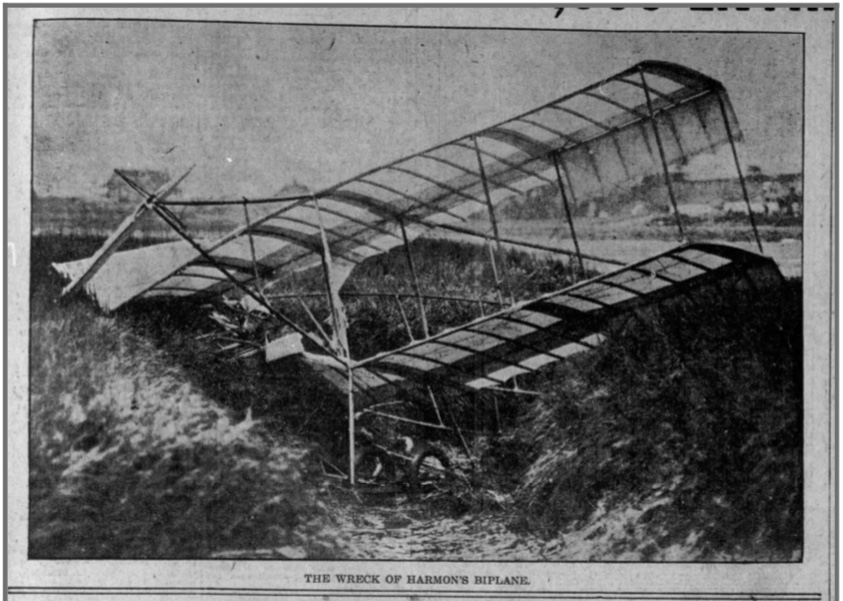
Wreckage of Harmon's biplane at the Boston aviation meet

In December 1928 Harmon sent a proposal to the League of Nations for an international air force that could be used by the League to prevent wars. While the proposal received some support, it was never seriously considered. In September 1930 Harmon made a flight in Villacoublay, France, commemorating his Long Island Sound crossing; with him on the flight was Maurice Farman, designer of the biplane Harmon used in the crossing.

In 1931 the Clifford B. Harmon Cup was created, to be awarded to amateur golfers.

Clifford Harmon continued to personally award the Harmon Trophy until 1938.

== Later business ventures ==
In 1912 Harmon was part of a syndicate that purchased Oklahoma oil leases from Charles Page for $1.25 million dollars. Also announced was a 2000 barrel-a-day refinery to be located at Sand Springs, Oklahoma.

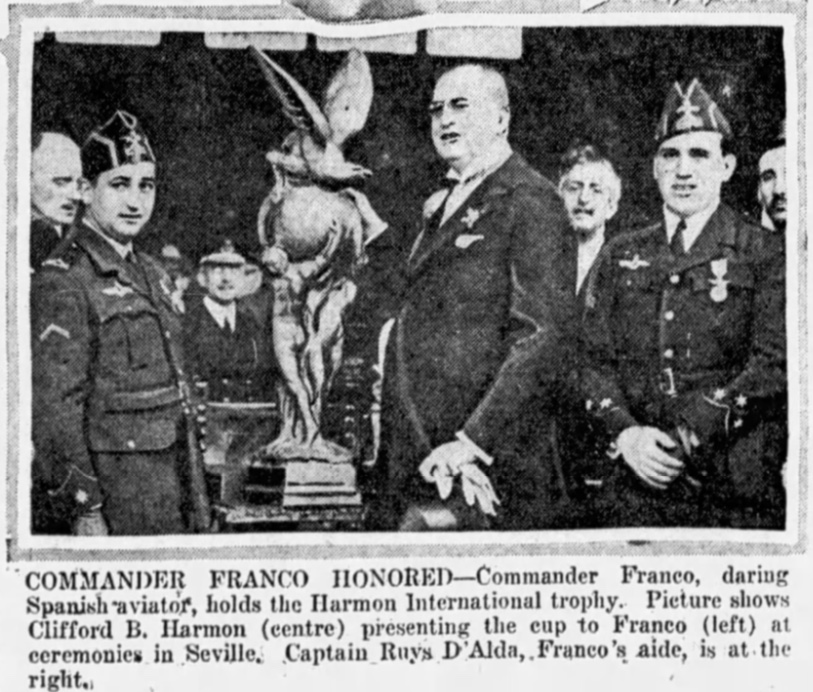
Harmon presenting the Harmon trophy in 1927

In 1915 Harmon became president of Mirror Films Incorporated, a film production company formed to apply business practices to film and "look upon film...as so much canned product". The company exhausted its working capital by mid-1916 and was subsequently mired in lawsuits (notably a breach of contract lawsuit filed by Nat Goodwin) through 1918 which put the company out of business.

== Personal life ==
Clifford Harmon married Zephyr Hord on September 18, 1887, in Dayton, Ohio; they divorced sometime after 1898. Harmon was later engaged to be married to Blanche Freeman, but broke the engagement in April 1904 to marry Louise Adele Benedict, daughter of Commodore Elias Cornelius (E.C.) Benedict. Freeman sued Harmon for breach of promise in 1909 (after initially suing for $100,000 and withdrawing the suit at Harmon's request), receiving an award of $15,000 in 1910. The award was set aside on appeal and the case retried later.

Harmon left Louise Benedict in 1916 after an argument with E.C. Benedict over support for his daughter. In 1917 Harmon traveled to China, India, and Japan.

On April 22, 1918, Harmon enlisted in the NY Guard Service, Troop A, Squadron A; he was discharged June 12, 1918. On October 13, 1918, he was commissioned as a captain in Air Signal Corps and served in France from November 1918 to January 1919, training aviators. He was discharged from the service January 24, 1919, with the rank of captain and 5% disability.

Harmon was excluded from E.C. Benedict's will when Benedict passed in 1920; Louise Benedict and Clifford Harmon were divorced April 7, 1925.

Harmon moved to Paris, France sometime after 1920 and became involved with Parisian society. He met Madeline Keltie, an opera singer 24 years his junior, in 1924 at the American embassy in Rome, Italy. In May 1925 Harmon was involved in a fistfight in Monte Carlo with Arthur St. John over St. Johns unwanted advances towards Keltie. Keltie and Harmon were engaged to be married in July 1925; the marriage was postponed in November 1925 and the engagement was broken in early 1927. Later in 1927, Clifford Harmon was best man at the marriage of Pola Negri and David M'divani in Paris.

In 1930, Harmon moved to Cannes, France, taking up residence in the Hotel Martinez. In 1932, Harmon accidentally drank a quantity of disinfectant, mistaking it for medication. He quickly drank a large quantity of hot water, diluting it and preventing a fatal overdose.

Harmon suffered a severe stroke in 1939 and was effectively an invalid afterwards. He resided in Cannes during the Nazi occupation in World War II, but due to his condition German forces did not pursue internment or other confinement.

== Death ==
Clifford Harmon died on June 25, 1945, in Cannes, France. In his will he left $48,431 for the continuation of the Harmon Trophy. He was interred the Rhone American Cemetery and Memorial, Draguignan, Departement du Var, Provence-Alpes-Côte d'Azur, France.

== Legacy ==
Per stipulations in the agreements related to developing Harmon-on-Hudson, the Metro-North Railroad station Croton-Harmon is named after Harmon. When the hamlet of Harmon was annexed by the village of Croton in 1930, the "Harmon" designation was preserved in the name of the Croton-Harmon School District.
