= Hell's Bells (play) =

1925 play

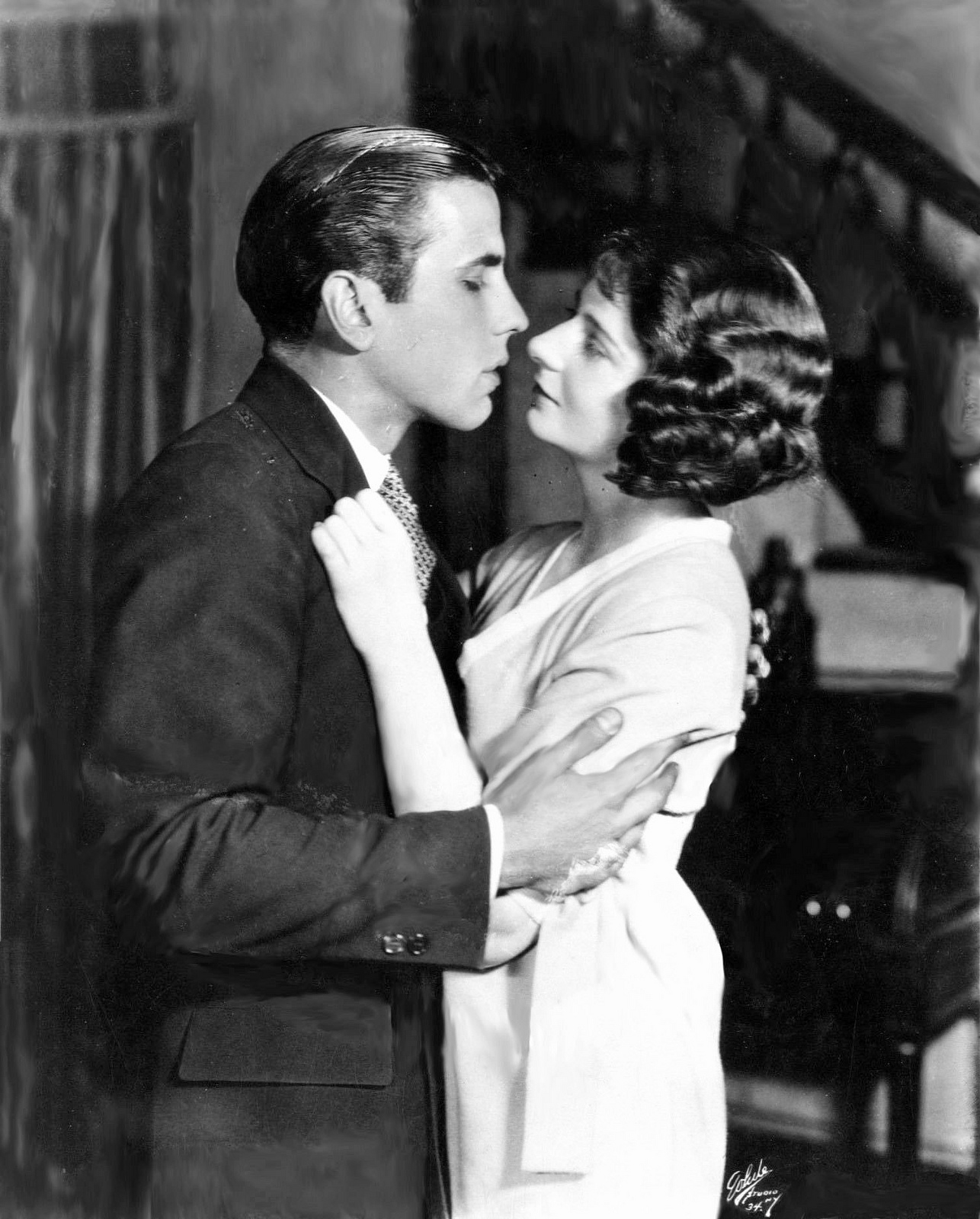
- Humphrey Bogart and Shirley Booth in Hell's Bells
- Original language: English
- Written by: Barry Conners
- Subject: Family squabble over imaginary wealth
- Genre: Farce
- Setting: Living room of Tanglewood Lodge, New Dauville, Connecticut

Premiere
- Date: January 26, 1925
- Place: Wallack's Theatre
- Directed by: John Hayden

Hell's Bells (AKA Fool's Gold) is a 1924 play in three acts written by Barry Conners. It is a farce with a large cast and one setting. The story concerns two middle-aged Arizona-based prospecters, sent back East by a speculator to sell shares in his mine. To expedite sales, they pose as millionaires, which leads the Connecticut sisters of one prospector to have him committed so they can obtain control of his supposed wealth.

Produced by Herman Gantvoort, it starred Tom H. Walsh and Eddie Garvie, with Olive May, Humphrey Bogart, and Shirley Booth in support. It ran on Broadway from late January through May 1925. During those four months it changed venues twice, and was marred by an on-stage shooting incident on February 11, 1925. The play has never had a Broadway revival, nor was it ever adapted for film.

== Characters ==
Listed in order of appearance within their scope.
Leads

- Danial "Jap" Stillson is a long-ago cast-out son of a Connecticut family, now a desert prospecter.
- D. O'Donnell, called "D.O.", is Jap's junior partner in mining, but a large corpulent fellow in the flesh.

Supporting

- Mrs. Buck is the widowed owner of the Tanglewood Lodge.
- Nan Winchester is the daughter of an old flame of Jap Stillson.
- Jimmy Todhunter is a personable young man in his early twenties, son of Mrs. Todhunter.
- Hoarce E. Pitkins is an attorney for Abigail and Mrs. Todhunter.
- Mrs. Amos Todhunter is a widowed sister of Jap Stillson.
- Abigail Stillson is a spinster sister of Jap Stillson.

Featured

- Gladys Todhunter is a teenager, Jimmy's little sister, who's dragooned into her mother's scheme.
- Chief of Police Pitkins is a cousin to Hoarce and provides him police support.
- Dr. Bushell is the director of the sanitarium where Jap's sisters try to commit him.
- Halligan is a policeman.
- Swartz is an asylum orderly.
- Riordan is an asylum orderly.

Walk-on

- Mahoney is another policeman. (Note: A non-speaking role, which cast lists identify as being played by the ubiquitous George Spelvin.)

Off stage

- The Promoter is the new owner of the Gango River Gold Mine Corporation. (Note: This is a placeholder label for the actual name of this character, which is unknown.)
- Judge Herman signs the commitment papers for Jap drawn up by Horace Pitkins.

== Synopsis ==
The setting is the living room of Tanglewood Lodge, a country hotel, in the fictional New Dauville, Connecticut, over the course of two days. The lodge is owned by Mrs. Buck, a widow. Living elsewhere in town is Mrs. Amos Todhunter, another widow, who lives with her son Jimmy and daughter Gladys. Also in town is Abigail Stillson, spinster sister of Mrs. Todhunter. The two sisters' attention is caught by a newspaper item detailing the munificent spending of two Arizona prospectors visiting New York. They recognize one of the prospectors as their long-lost brother Danial Stillson, who goes by the nickname "Jap". Jap Stillson and his partner D.O. had sold the Gango River Gold Mine for $1000 to a promoter. The promoter formed a corporation and sent the boys back East to flog shares in the corporation. Secretly, he gave them a generous expense account with instructions to flash money to draw buyers. The boys have followed instructions so well they are down to their last $500 bill.

They decide to visit New Dauville so Jap can vent spite on the family that disowned him over a romance with a poor local girl. They take rooms with Mrs. Buck at Tanglewood Lodge, and to keep up pretenses, tip her with the $500. They then learn the speculator backing them has gone bust. Mrs. Buck informs them the $500 bill may be redeemed upon one of them (she isn't fussy) marrying her. Also living at Tanglewood is Nan Winchester, who is the daughter of Jap's old flame. After visiting Tanglewood to meet Jap, Abigail and Mrs. Todhunter solicit their attorney Hoarce Pitkens to draw up involuntary commitment papers for him, so they can gain control of his supposed wealth. Meanwhile Jimmy Todhunter and Nan Winchester are having their own secret romance, while Gladys Todhunter is an unwilling helper in the commitment plot. When Judge Herman signs the papers, Chief Pitkins and Dr. Bushell send their men to grab Jap Stillson, but D.O. draws a pistol from his coat to stop them. He renders the scheme moot by revealing the partners are "stony broke". The sisters are embarrassed and withdraw the petition for commitment, since otherwise they would have to pay for Jap's care. With their discomfiture and moral retreat, Jimmy and Nan are able to get married, as does Mrs. Buck and Jap Stillson.

== Original production ==
=== Background ===
For producer Herman Gantvoort this was his first experience with a Broadway production. He had previously been a singer and composer, and had produced a silent movie.

Conners' play, originally titled Fool's Gold, (Note: The name under which it would eventually be published in 1928.) was renamed to The Hide Behinds and then Hell's Bells just a few days before its Broadway premiere.

=== Cast ===
Speaking cast for the tryout in Philadelphia and during the original Broadway run. The production was on hiatus from January 4 through January 21, 1925.
Role	Actor	Dates	Notes and sources
Jap Stillson	Tom H. Walsh	Dec 22, 1924 - May 30, 1925	
D. O'Donnell	Eddie Garvie	Dec 22, 1924 - May 30, 1925	
Mrs. Buck	Lotta Linthicum	Dec 22, 1924 - Jan 03, 1925	
Mrs. Buck	Olive May	Jan 26, 1925 - Feb 28, 1925	
Mrs. Buck	Lotta Linthicum	Mar 02, 1925 - May 30, 1925	She rejoined the cast when the play switched to Daly's 63rd Street Theatre.
Nan Winchester	Shirley Booth	Dec 22, 1924 - May 30, 1925	Her Broadway debut. Booth was also an interior decorator and helped with the setting.
Jimmy Todhunter	Humphrey Bogart	Dec 22, 1924 - May 30, 1925	He played the "juvenile", which at the time was a male counterpart to an ingénue.
Mrs. Amos Todhunter	Camilla Crume	Dec 22, 1924 - May 30, 1925	
Abigail Stillson	Virginia Howell	Dec 22, 1924 - May 30, 1925	
Gladys Todhunter	Violet Dunn	Dec 22, 1924 - May 30, 1925	Dunn's understudy was thirteen-year-old Miriam Battista.
Chief Pitkins	Ernest Pollock	Dec 22, 1924 - May 30, 1925	
Dr. Bushell	Fletcher Harvey	Dec 22, 1924 - May 30, 1925	
Halligan	James Cherry	Dec 22, 1924 - May 30, 1925	
Swartz	Clifton Self	Dec 22, 1924 - May 30, 1925	
Riordan	Converse Tyler	Dec 22, 1924 - May 30, 1925	

=== Tryout ===
The play was first presented at the Garrick Theatre in Philadelphia as Fool's Gold, for a two-week tryout beginning December 22, 1924. The local reviewer reported due to Christmas week the theatre wasn't full enough for the audience to generate infectious laughter, and so seemed only "mildly amused".

=== Premiere and reception ===
Hell's Bells had its Broadway premiere on January 26, 1925 at Wallack's Theatre. Burns Mantle of the New York Daily News commented on the relentless pace of the humor and how the audience eventually grew physically wearied with laughter. He thought the play had much good original material, but other reviewers disagreed. The critic for The New York Times called it "a painfully synthetic comedy" and labelled it "stagey" even though he recorded the audience's delight with it. The reviewer for the Brooklyn Standard Union agreed: "The piece is just a bit stagey. The situations, language and characters are rather artificial." The critic for the Brooklyn Times Union was more positive, being especially appreciative of the comic rapport between Tom H. Walsh and Eddie Garvie, and the acting support of Shirley Booth and Olive May. The reviewer for the Brooklyn Citizen concurred, citing the same four actors, and then adding "Humphrey Bogart is also good".

=== Shooting incident ===
During the evening performance at Wallack's Theatre on February 11, 1925, actor Eddie Garvie couldn't find the stage revolver that was always left for him on a specific table by the property master. This gun was waved about at the end of the second act, as Garvie's character tries to prevent asylum orderlies and cops from taking Jap Stillson (Tom H. Walsh) away. He went to the property department, and was given a gun which he took onstage, concealed in his vest as usual. When the moment came to produce it, the gun went off. The bullet struck actor Clifton Self a glancing blow in the left arm and whizzed past actress Shirley Booth, who was waiting in the wings. Self fell immediately to the stage floor, bleeding, while Shirley Booth screamed and fainted, but was caught by actress Olive May, standing just behind her.

The curtain came down, and after twenty minutes the theatre manager assured the audience that Clifton Self was ok, and the play resumed. Summoned by phone from the theater, detectives from a nearby police station placed Eddie Garvie under arrest for a violation of the Sullivan Act, but allowed him to finish the play. He was then taken to the police station, where an attorney posted $500 bail for him. The charge arose because the gun didn't actually belong to the theatre's property department, and hence wasn't on the exempt list filed with the police. It was the private property of a stage carpenter; how it came to be handed to Garvie wasn't specified in news stories. Garvie appeared in Magistrate's Court a few days later, and was acquitted of the charge.

=== Changes of venue and closing ===
After the shooting incident, Hell's Bells finished at Wallack's Theatre on Saturday, February 28, 1925, re-opening on Monday, March 2, 1925 at Daly's 63rd Street Theatre. A newspaper account reported producer Ganvoort had leased Daly's Theatre for the entire summer, but Hell's Bells stayed only three weeks. It finished at Daly's Theatre on March 21, 1925, re-opening at George M. Cohan's Theatre on March 23, 1925.

The play closed on May 30, 1925 at George M. Cohan's Theatre.
