= The Butterflies (play) =

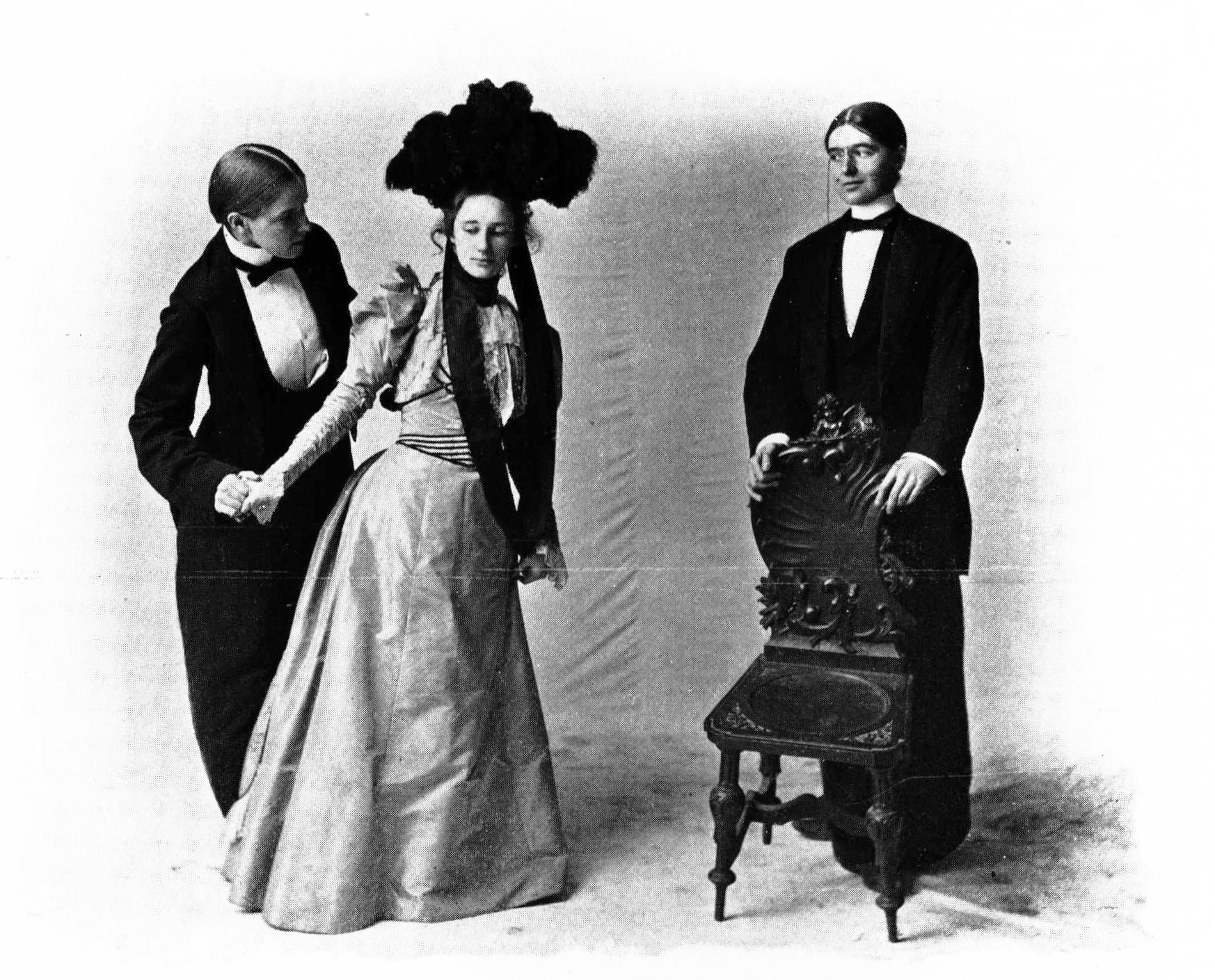
- A production of The Butterflies at Vassar College on November 13, 1897
- Written by: Henry Guy Carleton
- Setting: St. Augustine, Florida and Lenox, Massachusetts

Premiere
- Date: February 5, 1894
- Place: Palmer's Theater; New York City

The Butterflies is an American play. It was featured on Broadway in 1894 and starred Maude Adams. Olive May was also in the cast.

== History ==
It was written by Henry Guy Carleton. It opened on February 5, 1894, at Palmer's Theater in New York City. It played for thirteen weeks, closing on May 5. It toured Brooklyn, Philadelphia, and later San Francisco.
