= The Woman in Black (1914 film) =

- Directed by: Lawrence Marston
- Written by: H. Grattan Donnelly (on his own play)
- Based on: play The Woman in Black by H. Grattan Donnelly
- Produced by: Biograph Company; Klaw & Erlanger
- Starring: Lionel Barrymore; Alan Hale
- Cinematography: Tony Gaudio
- Distributed by: General Film Company
- Release date: November 1914
- Running time: 3-4 reels; c. 40 minutes
- Country: USA
- Language: Silent..English titles

The Woman in Black is a 1914 silent film drama directed by Lawrence Marston and starring Lionel Barrymore and Alan Hale. It was produced by the Biograph Company and distributed by the General Film Company.

The film has been preserved in paper print form in the Library of Congress collection.

== Cast ==
- Lionel Barrymore – Robert Crane
- Alan Hale – Frank Mansfield
- Mrs. Lawrence Marston (Anna Cornelia Delves) – Zenda, The Woman in Black
- Marie Newton – Mary, the Gypsy Girl
- Millicent Evans – Stella Everett
- Charles Hill Mailes – Mr. Everett
- Hector V. Sarno
- Jack Drumier
- Frank Evans
