= Henry Guy Carleton =

American dramatist

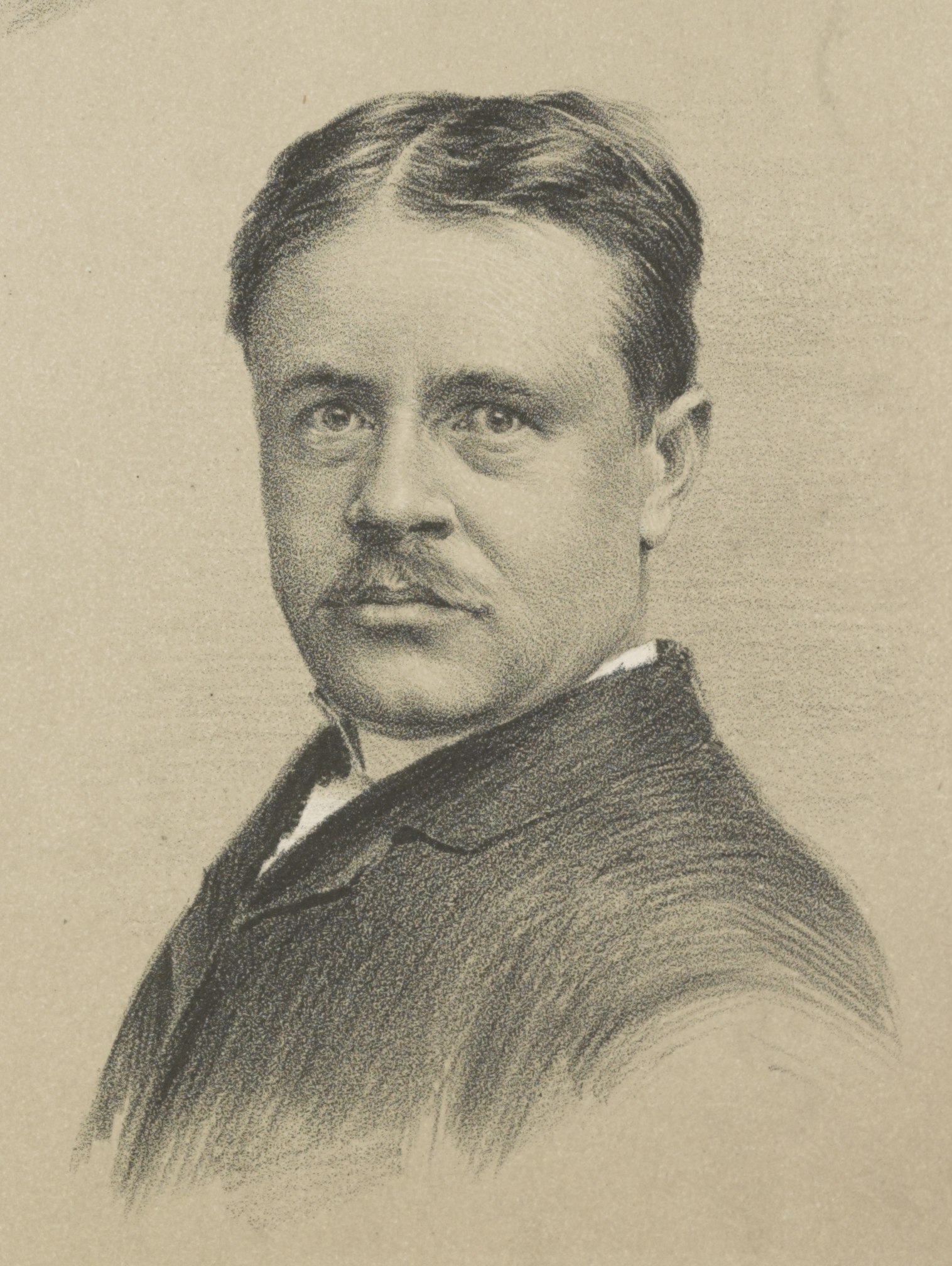
- Born: June 21, 1851 (some sources report 1856); Fort Union, New Mexico
- Died: December 10, 1910 (aged 59); Hot Springs, Arkansas
- Occupations: Humorist, playwright, and journalist
- Spouse(s): Helen Sinclair Hubbard (1885-89); Effie Shannon (1890-93); Olive May (1894-98)

Henry Guy Carleton (June 21, 1851 – December 10, 1910) was an American humorist, playwright, and journalist. He was best known for his comedic plays A Gilded Fool (1892) and The Butterflies (1894).

== Biography ==
Carleton was born at Fort Union, New Mexico on June 21, 1851 (or 1856), the son of General James H. Carleton. He graduated from Santa Clara College and briefly served in the army during the Indian Wars of the 1870s before going to work for the New Orleans Times in 1876. He later spent time in Chicago, and then went to New York and had some success as a humorist. In 1883, he became managing editor of the new Life magazine, where he wrote sketches such as those about the "Thompson Street Poker Club," which were illustrated by E. W. Kemble.

In 1891, Carleton reported on the current plight of various Native American nations, and he uncovered the fact that the Sisseton Sioux, who were dangerously low on food, were still owed money by the government for sale of their surplus land. Perhaps in part because of Carleton's reporting, in 1891 Congress finally passed a bill for the relief of the Sisseton Wahpeton scouts.

His first play to be staged was Memnon in 1884, but he did not have a real success until 1892's A Gilded Fool, which featured Nat Goodwin, as well as The Butterflies in 1894, which featured Maude Adams.

Carleton was married three times. First to Helen Sinclair Hubbard (1885–1889), second to actress Effie Shannon from 1890 to 1893, and third to actress Olive May from 1894 to 1898.

He also did work in the electrical field, and had some patents on electrical devices.

Carlton had a pronounced stuttering impediment, which he typically acknowledged with good humor. As one story went (and was told in different variations), the actor Maurice Barrymore once met Carleton in the street, who said "I s-s-s-say, B-B-B-B-Barry, have you g-g-g-got half an h-h-h-hour to s-s-s-spare, I w-w-w-want to t-t-talk to you for f-f-f-five m-m-m-minutes." Another story was that a young woman once asked if he had always stuttered, whereupon he responded that he had not. When asked when he began, he replied "W-w-when I b-b-b-began t-t-to talk." He also once said "People say I stutter. I don't. I only punctuate peculiarly."

Carleton was in poor health in his later years, and he died of paralysis in Hot Springs, Arkansas, where he had come a year prior to treat his rheumatism, on December 10, 1910.

== Legacy ==
The Cambridge History of English and American Literature (1907–21) included Carleton on a list of 22 American playwrights identified as "the most important dramatists of the period between 1860-1918."

American writer Willa Cather wrote favorably of Carleton's popular appeal, noting, for example, in an 1894 column: "No one doubts or disputes that Shakespeare was the greatest of all dramatists, but the world is not always ready for the best. Sophocles certainly wrote better plays than Henry Guy Carleton, but the greatest tragedian of France played Antigone and Oedipus Rex to empty houses in New York last winter." The following year, she wrote: "Among the younger American dramatists there are very few who begin to have that feeling for language, who have begun to write lines that can stand alone. Mr. Carleton is certainly foremost among them. There are lines of In the Lion's Mouth and A Gilded Fool that haunt one's memory ..."

Cather scholar Bernice Slote, writing of Cather's commentary in the 1960s, opined that "Although he was able to write good plays, Henry Guy Carleton had only moderate success in New York, and mostly with The Butterflies (1894)."

A Gilded Fool was adapted into a silent film in 1915.

== Partial list of plays ==
- Memnon (1884)
- Victor Durand (1884)
- The Pembertons
- A Gilded Fool (1892) (starring Nat Goodwin)
- Ye Earlie Trouble (1892)
- The Lion's Mouth (1893)
- The Butterflies (1894)
- Lem Kettle (1894)
- Ambition (1895)
- The Imprudent Young Couple (1895)
- The Cuckoo (1898)
