= A Gilded Fool =

Play by Henry Guy Carleton

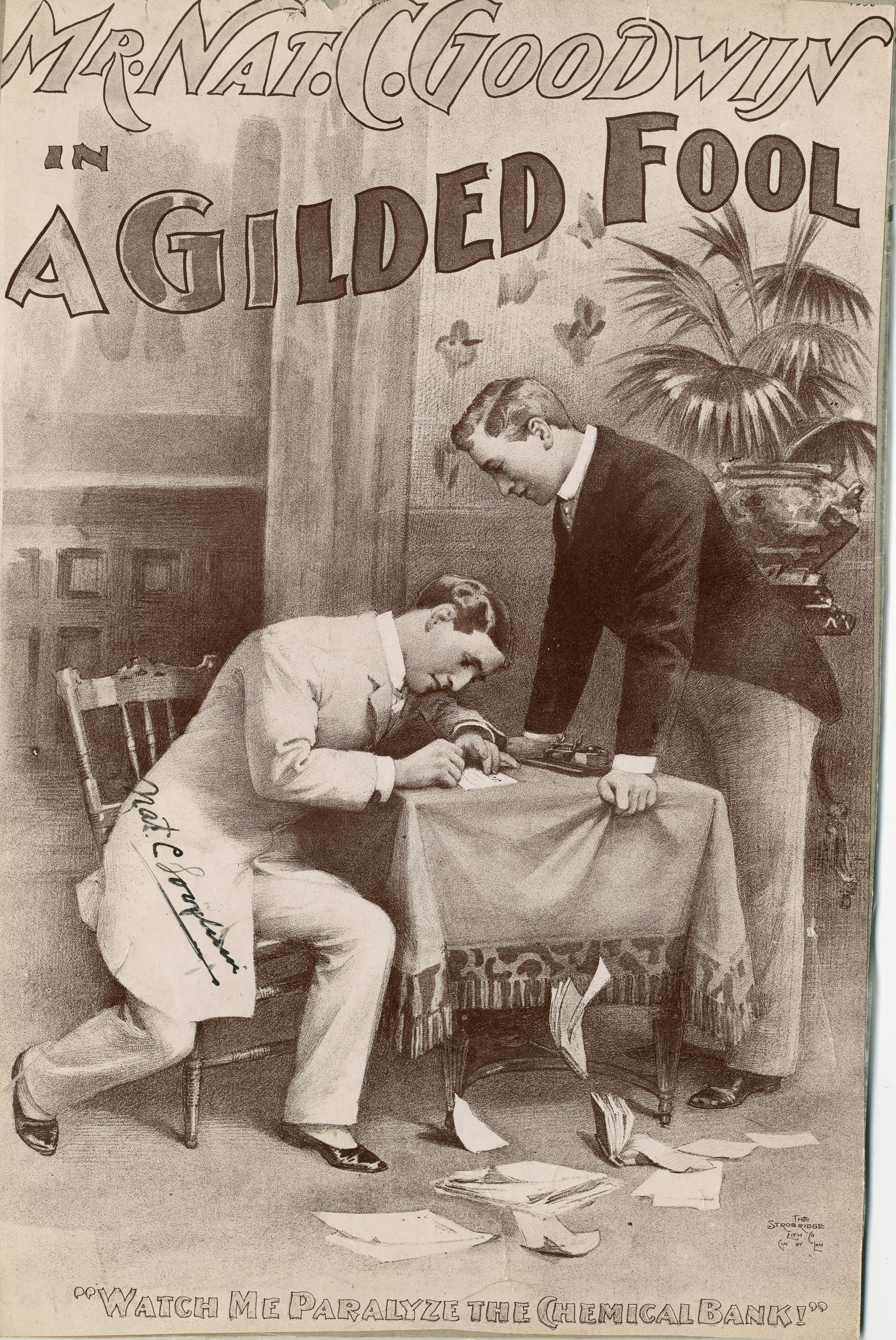
- Theatrical poster
- Written by: Henry Guy Carleton
- Original language: English
- Genre: Comedy

Premiere
- Date premiered: September 1, 1892
- Place premiered: Providence Opera House

A Gilded Fool is a four-act comedy play written by Henry Guy Carleton at the request of actor Nat Goodwin. After debuting in Providence, Rhode Island at the beginning of September 1892, the production quickly relocated to New York City, where it appeared first in Brooklyn, then on Broadway.

== History ==
Actor Nat Goodwin, who had become known for comedy, wanted to appear in a humorous play that included some elements of drama. He asked playwright Henry Guy Carleton, who had recently written two tragedies, to work with him on the story that became A Gilded Fool. The play debuted at the Providence Opera House on September 1, 1892, then moved to the Park Theatre in Brooklyn, New York, on September 5, 1892. It was staged on Broadway at the Fifth Avenue Theatre, where it opened on November 7, 1892.

== Plot ==
Chauncey Short, a friendly but unworldly young man, inherits a large fortune. He is romantically interested in Margaret Ruthven. The business run by Margaret's father, Matthew, is failing due to the manipulations of Bannister Strange. Strange tries to prevent Chauncey from helping the Ruthven firm by convincing him that Margaret is no longer interested in him. Suspicious, Chauncey asks for help from detective Jacob Howell, who disguises himself as a preacher to investigate Strange. Upon learning that Strange is lying, Chauncey decides to do the opposite of everything Strange recommends. By defying Strange's misleading advice, Chuancey builds an even bigger fortune and is able to save the Ruthvens from bankruptcy.

== Cast and characters ==
The characters and cast from the Broadway production are given below:

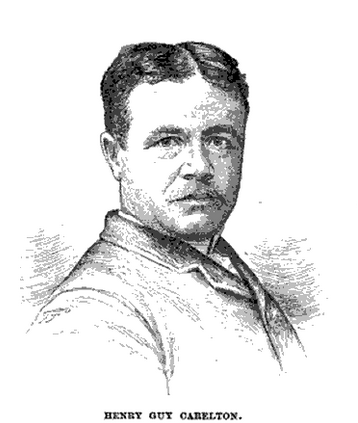
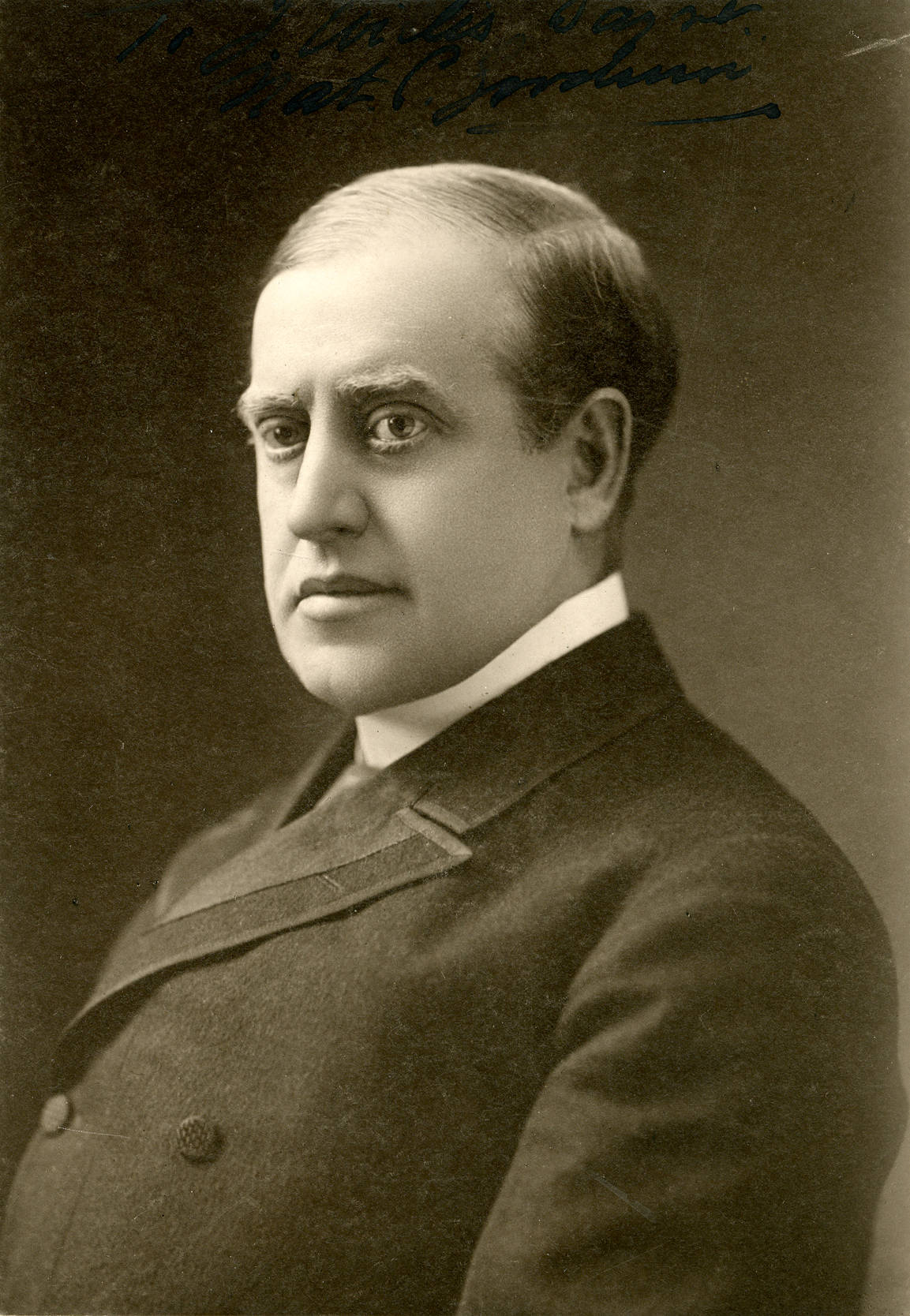
Henry Guy Carleton (left) wrote the play as a vehicle for actor Nat Goodwin (right).

Opening night cast
Character	Broadway cast
Chauncey Short	Nat Goodwin
Bannister Strange	Clarence Holt
Jacob Howell	Theodore Babcock
Matthew Ruthven	Henry Lee
Margaret Ruthven	Lizzie Hudson Collier
De Peyster Ruthven	Sidney Wilmer
Jack Duval	T. D. Frawley
Perkins	J. H. Browne
Morgan	R. G. Wilson
Sophia Ruthven	Jean Clara Walters
Jessie Rood	Estelle Mortimer
Nell Ruthven	Minnie Dupree

== Film adaptation ==
In 1915, the play was adapted as a silent film of the same name, directed by Edgar Lewis. Fox Film produced the adaptation, which starred William Farnum as Chauncey.
