= Ambition (play) =

Ambition is a play in three acts by Henry Guy Carleton. Carleton wrote the play for the actor Nat Goodwin. It opened on Broadway at the Fifth Avenue Theatre on October 22, 1895. It had a short run in New York which ended in early November 1895. The work then toured in 1895–1896 to the Chestnut Street Opera House in Philadelphia the National Theatre in Washington, D.C., the Hollis Street Theatre in Boston, the Grand Opera House in St. Louis, and Coates Opera House in Kansas City among other venues. The play was later part of the repertoire of the Cummings Stock Company.

The San Francisco Chronicle review stated that Ambition was similar to David D. Lloyd and Sydney Rosenfeld's 1890 play The Senator. The New-York Tribune noted that the playwright took advantage of the then current political situation involving the Cuban War of Independence; with the protagonist politician's support of the Cuban cause playing positively to American feelings of solidarity with Cuban freedom fighters during the 1890s. The Chicago Tribune felt the play would be successful but needed condensing with the last act being "particularly slow and dry".

== Plot ==
American senator Obediah Beck (Nat Goodwin), a potential future candidate for United States Secretary of State or President of the United States, navigates the duplicitous landscape of American politics in Washington D.C. He experiences conflicts with the wife of the British ambassador, as well as the machinations of fellow politicians who appear to be friends but are working against him. He is supported by his girlfriend, Ruth (Annie Russell), and his secretary (Arthur Hoops). He ultimately manages to outwit his adversaries.
