= Anco Cinema =

Former Broadway theater and cinema

Coordinates: 40.75674°N 73.98924°W

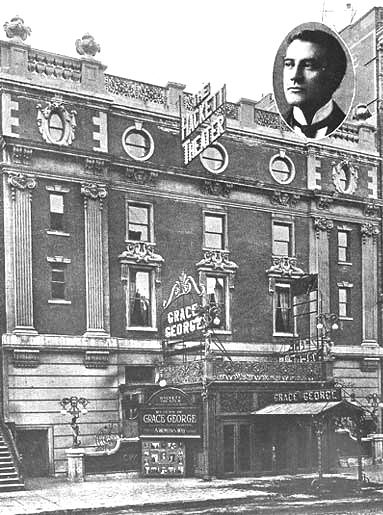
254 West 42nd Street: The Hackett Theater in 1909, during the run of A Woman's Way.

The Anco Cinema was a former Broadway theatre turned cinema at 254 West 42nd Street, between 7th and 8th Avenues in Manhattan, New York City. It opened in 1904 and was originally named the Lew Fields Theatre. It continued to operate as a playhouse under various names until it was converted into a movie theatre in 1930. Its block was famous for its concentration of Broadway theatres turned cinemas. After World War II, the street declined and the Anco Cinema eventually became a pornography venue. It closed as a cinema in 1988 and was gutted for retail use. The building was demolished in 1997.

== Playhouse ==
254 West 42nd St.
As of	Name
December 5, 1904	Lew Fields
August 27, 1906	Hackett
August 31, 1911	Harris
September 7, 1920	Frazee
November 12, 1924	Wallack's
1940	Anco Cinema
1997	[demolished]

In 1903, producer Fred R. Hamlin and producer/director Julian Mitchell had a big Broadway hit with The Wizard of Oz, a musical staging of the L. Frank Baum story, and they had another with Babes in Toyland, a Victor Herbert operetta, later in the year. In 1904, Oscar Hammerstein I announced plans to build his eighth Manhattan theater (after the Harlem and Manhattan opera houses, the Olympia and Victoria music halls, and the Columbus, Olympia and Republic theaters), on vacant land he had recently bought at 254–58 West 42nd Street, calling it the National. It would be designed by Albert E. Westover, a Philadelphia architect who designed several theaters in that city for vaudeville operator B. F. Keith and is credited with Hammerstein's Republic. The same year, comedians Joe Weber and Lew Fields ended their decades-long partnership, giving their final show May 28, at the New Amsterdam Theatre. On May 31, the new partnership of Hamlin, Mitchell, and Fields contracted to lease Hammerstein's (not-yet-built) new house. They announced they would name it for Fields and produce musicals and burlesques.

=== 1900s ===
Their first offering was a new Victor Herbert operetta, It Happened in Nordland, with libretto and lyrics by Glen MacDonough, starring Fields and Marie Cahill, together with a burlesque of The Music Master, a current hit play. The Lew Fields Theatre opened on December 5, 1904, eight days after Hamlin's unexpected death. The show was a hit; the production ran through April 29, 1905, went on a road tour, resumed on August 31 with Blanche Ring instead of Marie Cahill, and closed on November 18, for another tour.

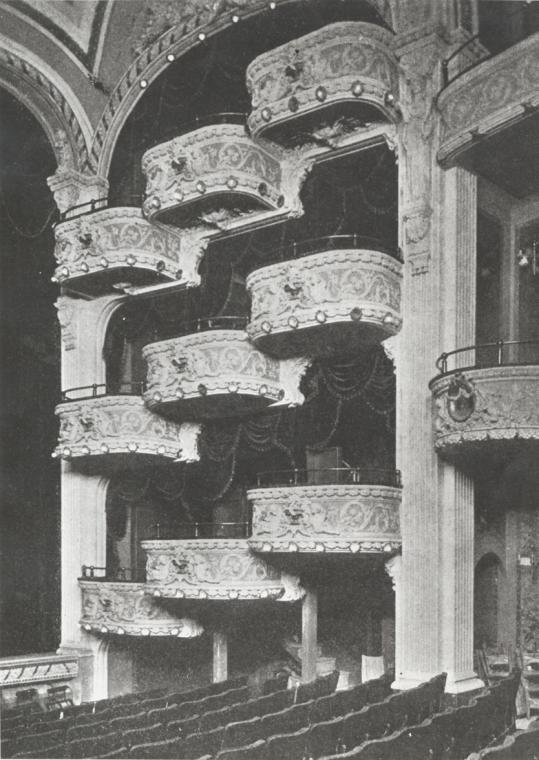
Lew Fields Theatre

On May 23, 1906, Fields formed a corporation with Lee Shubert of the Shubert Brothers, taking joint possession of the Herald Square Theatre. Fields and Mitchell moved there in August, and the former Lew Fields Theatre was leased by the well-known actor-manager James K. Hackett, who renamed it for himself. The Hackett Theater opened August 27 with a farce imported from London, The Little Stranger, starring Edward Garratt. Its first big success was the seven-month run of The Chorus Lady, starring Rose Stahl, from October 15, 1906, through June 1, 1907. (The play had opened at the Savoy Theatre on September 1.) In the first week of February 1907, Hammerstein sold the theater to Henry B. Harris, the theatrical producer who bought the Hudson Theatre the next year and built the Folies-Bergere in 1911. Hackett retained his lease and the playhouse its name.

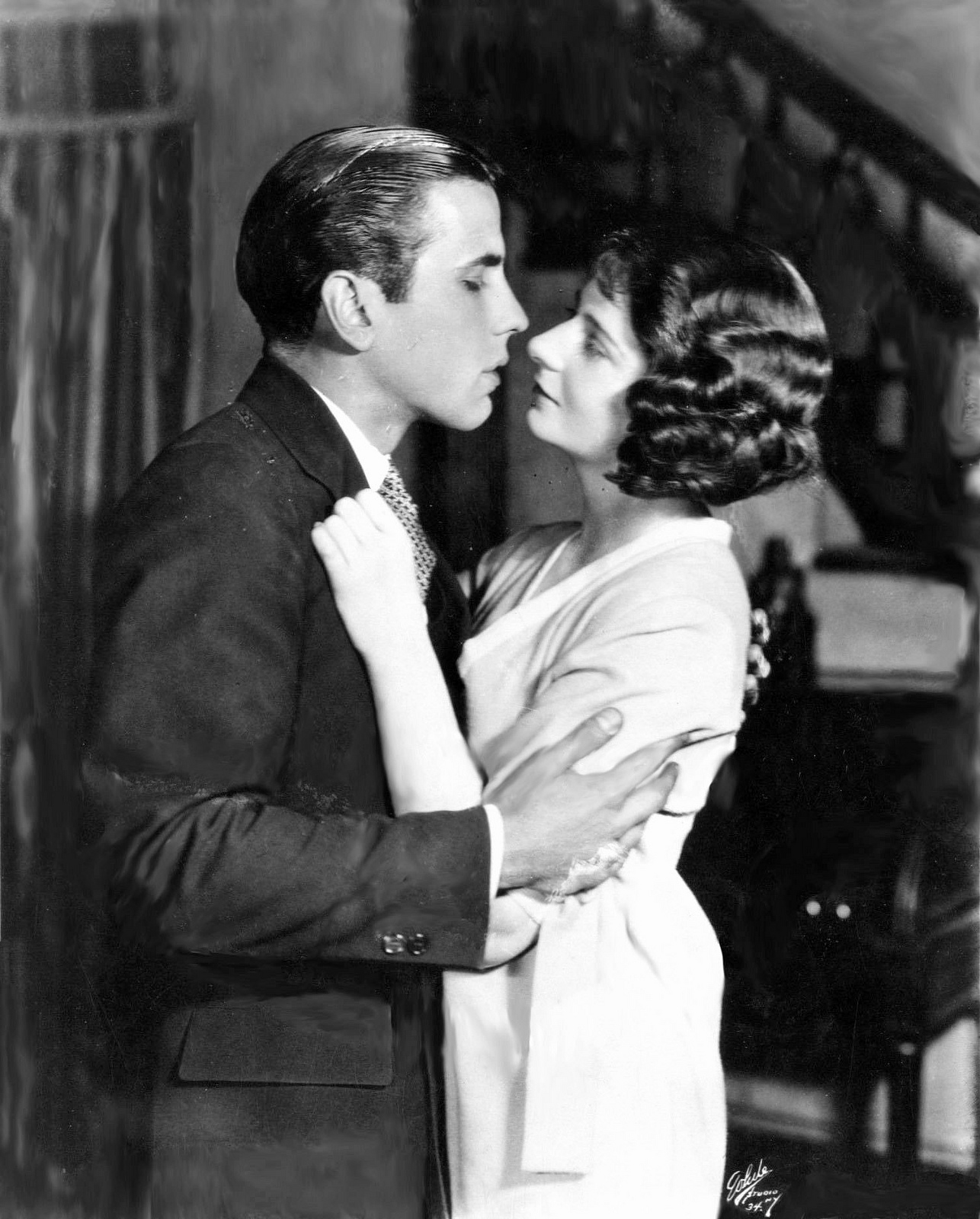
Humphrey Bogart and Shirley Booth in Hell's Bells at Wallack's Theatre (1925)

Another big success at the Hackett was the Shubert production The Witching Hour, a dramatic play by Augustus Thomas, which played from November 20, 1907, to June 27, 1908, and from August 17, 1908, to September 19, 1908 (when it moved to the West End Theatre on 125th Street). From September 21 through October 10, 1908, Hackett reprised his starring role in The Prisoner of Zenda, which he had first played on February 10, 1896. (In 1913, he starred in the novel's first film adaption, which was produced by Adolph Zukor and was the first production of the Famous Players Film Company.)

=== 1910s ===
In 1911, Hackett's lease expired and Henry B. Harris took over, making major interior and exterior alterations. The New York City government announced the same year that it would widen 42nd Street, requiring that the Lew Fields Theatre's lobby and marquee be modified. Harris named the playhouse the Harris Theatre in honor of his father, William Harris Sr., also a theater owner and producer, and an associate of the Theatrical Syndicate. The Harris opened on August 31 with a new play, Maggie Pepper, again starring Rose Stahl.

Henry B. Harris died in the sinking of the RMS Titanic in April 1912. His estate operated the theater for the next two and a half years, and September 21, 1914, leased it to Selwyn and Company; i.e., Crosby Gaige and the Selwyn brothers. They mounted several productions at the Harris, the first on October 23: The Salamander, by Owen Johnson (adapted from his book), starring Carroll McComas.

=== 1920s ===
When the Selwyn & Co. lease expired on July 1, 1920, Harris's widow sold the theater to H. H. Frazee, a producer and theater owner and owner of the Boston Red Sox baseball team, who again made renovations and opened the Frazee Theatre with a new play September 7: The Woman of Bronze, starring Margaret Anglin, which ran for 252 performances. Dulcy, a comedy by George S. Kaufman and Marc Connelly, opened on August 13, 1921, made Lynn Fontanne a star, and ran through March 11, 1922.

In late 1924, John Cort leased the theater, naming it Wallack's Theatre (his Cort Theatre on 48th Street was already using his own name); in two years he had no hits. Frazee sold it in October 1926, and it was leased out again, housing nothing but flops. The last was called Find the Fox, and its third performance, on Saturday evening, June 21, 1930, brought the legitimate career of this theater to an end.

== Movie theater ==
In late 1930, the theater was leased to Max A. Cohen's company, Excello Estates, which showed movies in it. According to Henderson, "Cohen bought the land underneath Wallack's in 1940 ... tore out the second balcony, put stadium seating in the orchestra" and replaced the facade "with a windowless sheet of bland stucco." Cohen named it Anco Cinema after his wife Anne. Cohen headed the Cinema Circuit, which was also operating the Harris and New Amsterdam theaters by the mid-1930s. This was part of a decline in the Broadway theater industry in the mid-20th century; from 1931 to 1950, the number of legitimate theaters decreased from 68 to 30.

By the mid-1940s, the ten theaters along 42nd Street between Seventh and Eighth Avenues were all showing movies; this led Variety to call the block the "biggest movie center of the world". The Brandt family operated seven of these theaters, while the Cinema Circuit operated the other three. The Cinema Circuit theaters, the New Amsterdam, Harris, and Anco, were all on the southern side of the street. By the late 1950s, the Anco was classified as a "reissue house", displaying reruns of films and changing its offerings twice a week. Tickets cost 25 to 65 cents apiece, the cheapest admission scale for any theater on 42nd Street. The Anco and the other 42nd Street theaters operated from 8 a.m. to 3 a.m., with three shifts of workers. The ten theaters on the block attracted about five million visitors a year between them.

Cohen retired around 1961, and Mark Finkelstein took over full operation of the Cinema Circuit. By the early 1960s, the surrounding block had decayed, but many of the old theater buildings from the block's heyday remained, including the Anco. The area continued to decline, although Finkelstein said none of the company's 42nd Street theaters showed hardcore pornography. The Cinema Circuit's movie theaters on 42nd Street continued to operate through the mid-1980s, at which point the Anco had been leased to the Sweetheart theatrical chain, which screened pornographic movies.

=== Redevelopment ===
The 42nd Street Development Corporation had been formed in 1976 to discuss plans for redeveloping Times Square. The same year, the City University of New York's Graduate Center hosted an exhibition with photographs of several nearby theaters to advocate for the area's restoration. One plan for the site, in 1978, called for razing several buildings in the area, including the Anco, to create a park. The Urban Development Corporation (UDC), an agency of the New York state government, proposed redeveloping the area around a portion of West 42nd Street in 1981. The plan centered around four towers that were to be built at 42nd Street's intersections with Broadway and Seventh Avenue, developed by Park Tower Realty and the Prudential Insurance Company of America. (Note: The sites were: Northwest corner of 42nd Street and Seventh Avenue: now 3 Times Square; Northeast corner of 42nd Street and Broadway: now 4 Times Square; Southwest corner of 42nd Street and Seventh Avenue: now 5 Times Square; South side of 42nd Street between Seventh Avenue and Broadway: now 7 Times Square (Times Square Tower)) Ultimately, the 42nd Street Redevelopment Project was delayed for several years due to lawsuits and disputes concerning the towers.

The New York state government acquired the sites of eight nearby theaters in April 1990 via eminent domain. Government officials hoped that development of the theaters would finally allow the construction of the four towers around 42nd Street, Broadway, and Seventh Avenue. After Disney committed to restoring the New Amsterdam Theatre in 1994, most of the other theaters around 42nd Street were quickly leased. By 1995, real-estate development firm Forest City Ratner was planning a $150 million entertainment and retail complex on the site of the Empire, Harris, and Liberty theaters. Madame Tussauds and AMC leased space in the complex that July. As part of the Forest City Ratner development, the Anco Cinema was demolished in 1997, and the Empire Theatre was relocated to the Anco's site the next year. The Empire Theatre's facade and auditorium were converted into an entrance to the AMC Empire 25, a multiplex that opened in April 2000.

== Notable productions ==
- 1920: The Woman of Bronze
- 1921: Dulcy
- 1922: From Morn to Midnight
- 1922: Her Temporary Husband
- 1923: The Chip Woman's Fortune
- 1923: Salome
- 1923: The Comedy of Errors
- 1924: The Kreutzer Sonata
- 1925: Hell's Bells
- 1925: Eve's Leaves
