= Lillian Lewis (actress) =

American stage actor

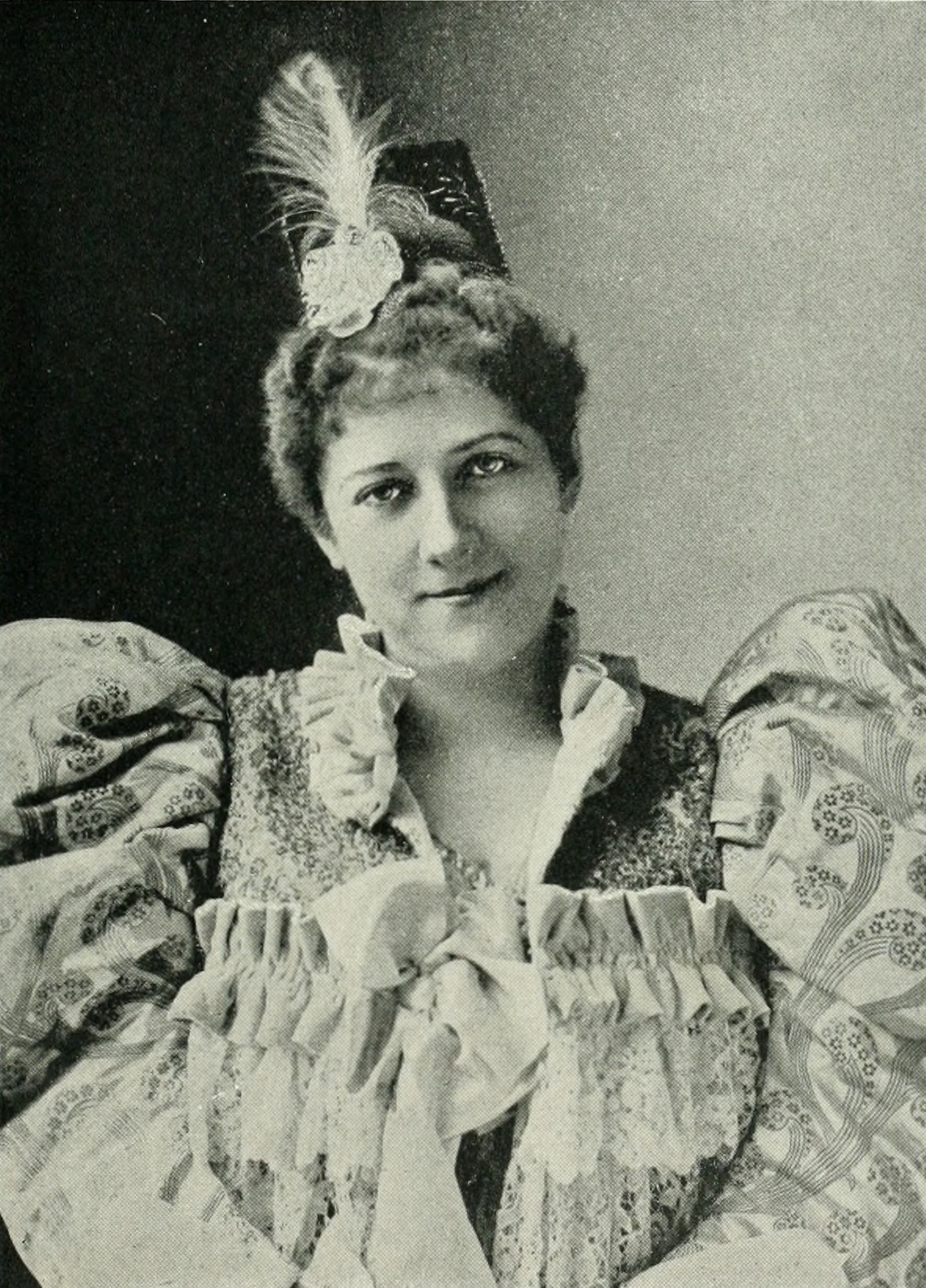
- Lewis, pictured in 1894
- Born: Katharine Lillian Manley; 1852
- Died: August 11, 1899 (aged 46–47); Farmington, Minnesota
- Occupations: Stage actor, playwright
- Years active: 1882–1898
- Spouse: Lawrence Marston (m. 1888)

Lillian Lewis (1852 – August 11, 1899) was an American stage actress known for her performances in comedies and modern dramas in the United States, Canada, and Europe. Her business manager and husband, playwright Lawrence Marston, wrote many of the plays in which she starred. She also collaborated with him as a playwright on three works.

== Early life ==
Katharine Lillian Manley, later known by Lillian, was born in 1852. Appletons' Annual Cyclopaedia and Register of Important Events listed her birthplace as Midway, Kentucky, though the Cameron County Press reported that she had been born in Coudersport, Pennsylvania before moving to Emporium as a young child. Lewis was one of four children. Her mother died when Lewis was young, and a brother died shortly thereafter.

She spent several years as a schoolteacher in Emporium and in Shippen, then moved with her father around 1873 to Minnesota. She enrolled in an elocution school in St. Louis, then began her stage career.

== Career ==
Lewis's first appearance on the stage was in 1882, when she played Marianne in The Two Orphans at the Fifth Avenue Theatre in New York City. After three years of success in various companies, she organized a company of her own and entered upon a successful career as a star at the People's Theater in New York, in the later half of 1885. She chose the part of Cora in Article 47 for her introduction to the public on that occasion, and was well received. In addition she played the principal woman in Camille, The Lady of Lyons, An Unequal Match, The New Magdalen, Frou-Frou, and Adrienne Lecouvreur.

In 1888 she married Lawrence Marston, who had been for some time her leading man. Marston continued to act the principal men of her plays, managed her business, and adapted and wrote plays for her. Lewis went on to perform in As in a Looking Glass, Doña Sol, Credit Lorraine, Lady Lil, Good-by, Sweetheart, An Innocent Sinner, For Liberty and Love and The Widow Goldstein. The last three were the joint work of Lewis and Marston.

In 1895, Lewis played the part of Cleopatra in an interpretation of Victorien Sardou's Cléopâtre, modified by Marston. She performed opposite Edmund Collier as Mark Antony in a production with elaborate scenery, costuming, and lighting. In her production, dancers performed a barefoot ballet for Cleopatra, to which Lewis had bought exclusive performance rights. She later requested the dance be removed from the production. According to Marston, quoted in the Los Angeles Herald in December 1895, "You know that Cleopatra is a difficult character to portray; in fact, the most difficult character in the whole range of the drama, and Miss Lewis thinks that the barefoot ballet, or rather this barefoot and barelegged dance, has been advertised so extensively that the people go to the theater and want to see the dance in the first act, and as it does not come on until the third act it makes it very hard for her." Although Lewis had a reputation as a skillful comedic and modern dramatic actor, her performance in Cléopâtre earned mixed reviews. The Arizona Journal-Miner wrote that the play "was probably the grandest production ever placed on a stage in Prescott. The scenery was magnificent, while Miss Lewis' impersonation of Cleopatra was simply perfect". Willa Cather wrote what William M. Curtin later described as a "scathing—and hilarious" review of Lewis's performance in the Nebraska State Journal. According to Curtin, "There was nothing in it from which Miss Lewis could have taken comfort, from the description of her entrance—'a barge drew up and from it descended a large, limp, lachrymose "Kleo-paw-tra", with an Iowa accent, a St. Louis air and the robust physique of a West England farmer's wife'—to the account of her death scene—'She sat down upon a cane-bottom dining-room chair, took her crown from a little sixteenth-century oak table, sighed and wept and heaved her breast and then died from an imaginary serpent hidden in a ditch of lettuce after having worn most atrocious gowns and having drawn and quartered and mangled some of the greatest lines in all the poetry of the world'".

Lewis's stage career took her to various cities throughout the United States, and to Canada and Europe. In around 1895, while touring the southern United States, Lewis fell ill. Her last appearance was in St. Louis, on April 27, 1898.

== Personal life ==
In 1888, Lewis married Lawrence Marston.

Battling tuberculosis, Lewis retired from acting in 1898 and returned to Minnesota, where her sister resided. She died in Farmington, Minnesota on August 11, 1899.
