= A Wall Street Tragedy =

1916 film by Lawrence Marston

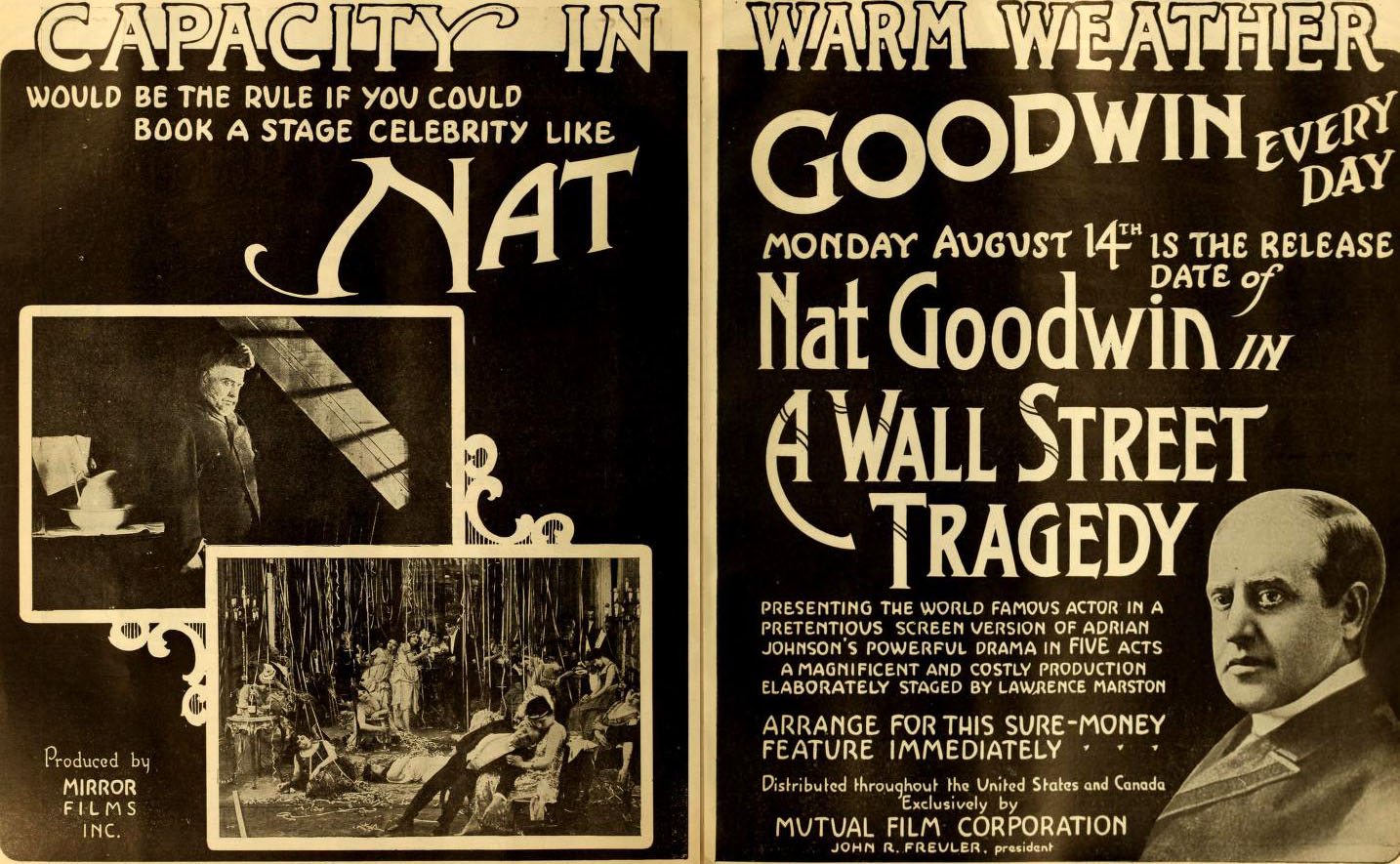
- contemporary advertisement to the film
- Directed by: Lawrence Marston
- Written by: Adrian Johnson
- Starring: Nat C. Goodwin
- Cinematography: Mr. Blainey
- Production company: Mirror Films
- Distributed by: Mutual Film Company
- Release date: August 14, 1916
- Running time: 5 reels
- Country: USA
- Language: Silent..English titles

A Wall Street Tragedy is a lost 1916 silent film drama directed by Lawrence Marston and starring Nat C. Goodwin. It was released by the Mutual Film Company.

== Cast ==
- Nat C. Goodwin - Norton
- Richard Neill - Ranson
- Mabel Wright - Mrs. Norton
- Mary Norton - Lois Norton
- Zola Telmzart - Yvette
- J. Cooper Willis - "The Rat"
- Clifford Grey - Roy Simms
