= The Marriage Bond (1916 film) =

1916 lost American silent drama film

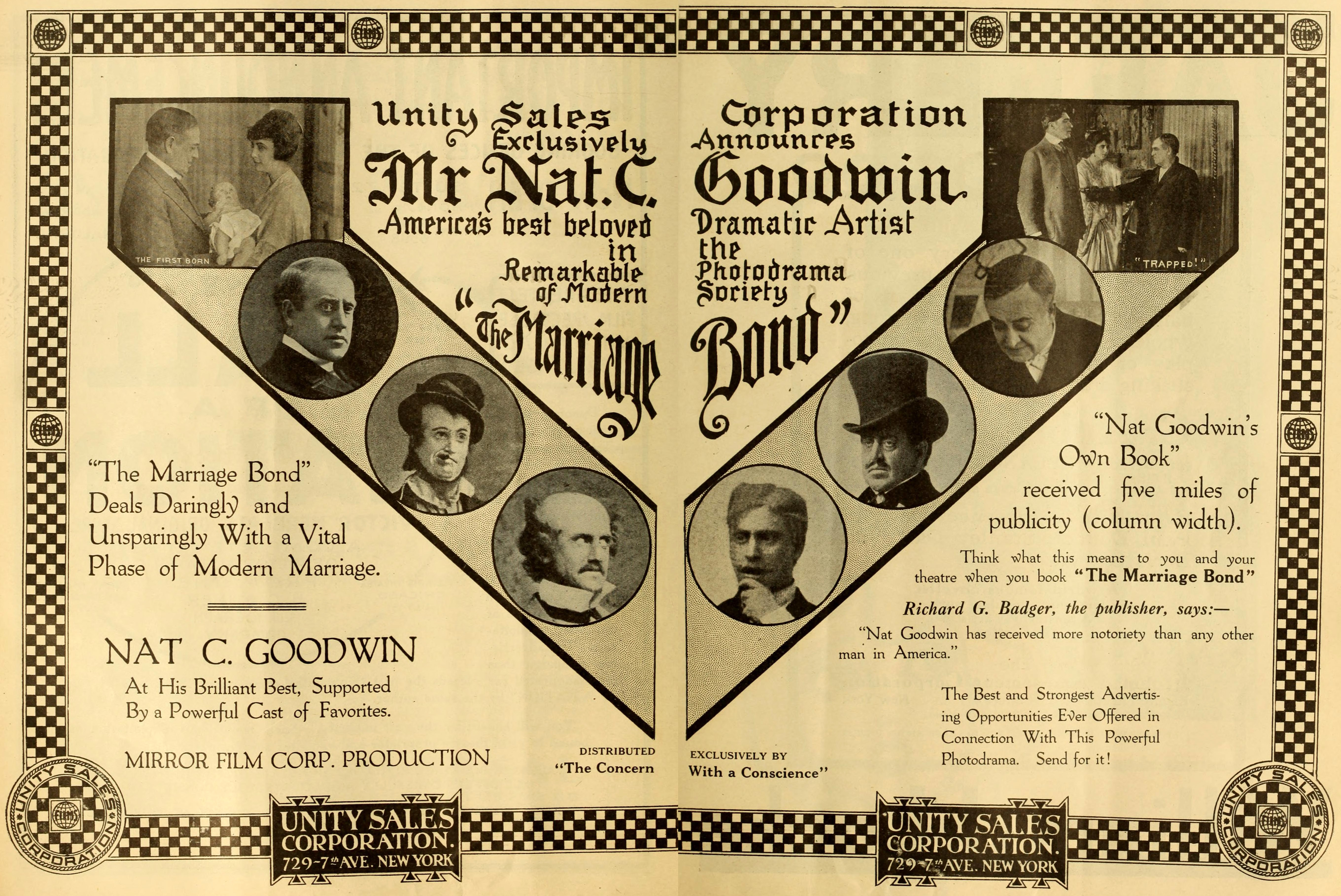
- period advertisement
- Directed by: Lawrence Marston
- Written by: Adrian Johnson
- Based on: a play by Rida Johnson Young
- Produced by: Mirror Films Inc.
- Starring: Nat C. Goodwin
- Cinematography: Carl von Hoffman
- Distributed by: State Rights; Unity Sales Corp.
- Release date: July 3, 1916
- Running time: 5 reels
- Country: USA
- Language: Silent...English intertitles

The Marriage Bond is a lost 1916 silent film drama directed by Lawrence Marston and starring Nat C. Goodwin. It was released on a State Rights basis.

== Cast ==
- Nat C. Goodwin - John Harwood
- Margaret Green - Jane Wilton

unbilled

- Raymond Bloomer
- Anne Jeffson
- P. J. Rollow
- Loel Steuart
