= Lawrence Marston =

American dramatist

Lawrence Marston (June 8, 1857 – February 1, 1939) was an American actor, playwright, producer, stage director and film director.

== Biography ==
Marston was born to a Jewish family in Hammerstadt, Bohemia, Austrian Empire (now Vlastějovice in the Czech Republic). Naturalized in Chicago, he lived mainly in New York City. After working as an actor, producer and director for the stage, he became a film director with the Biograph Studios.

His first wife was actress Lillian Lewis, who he married in 1888.

Marston's second wife Anna Cornelia Delves was billed as Mrs. Lawrence Marston. With her, he had his only daughter, Anna Lawrence Marston, who was baptized Catholic at age 12.

Lawrence Marston died February 1, 1939, in Manhattan. His ashes were interred into the mausoleum of Ferncliff Cemetery.

== Works ==
Playwright

- An Innocent Sinner (1896)
- The Widow Goldstein (1897)
- For Liberty and Love (1897)
- The Helmet of Navarre (1901)
- The Penitent (1902) from Hall Caine's novel A Son of Hagar
- The Little Mother (1902)
- A Remarkable Case (1902)
- After Midnight (1904)
- When the World Sleeps (1905)
- Jeanne D'arc (1906)

Screenwriter

- The Warfare of the Flesh (1917) scenario
- The Border Legion (1918)
- A Man of Iron (1925) adaptation

Stage director

- The Monster (1922) play by Crane Wilbur
- Death Takes a Holiday (1929) with Katharine Hepburn (both actress and director were fired during the run)

Film director

- The Star of Bethlehem
- The Evidence of the Film (1913) short
- The Woman in Black (1914)
- Under the Gaslight (1914) with Lionel Barrymore and Mrs. Lawrence Marston
- The Marriage Bond (1916)
- A Wall Street Tragedy (1916)
