= Olive May =

American actress (1871–1938)

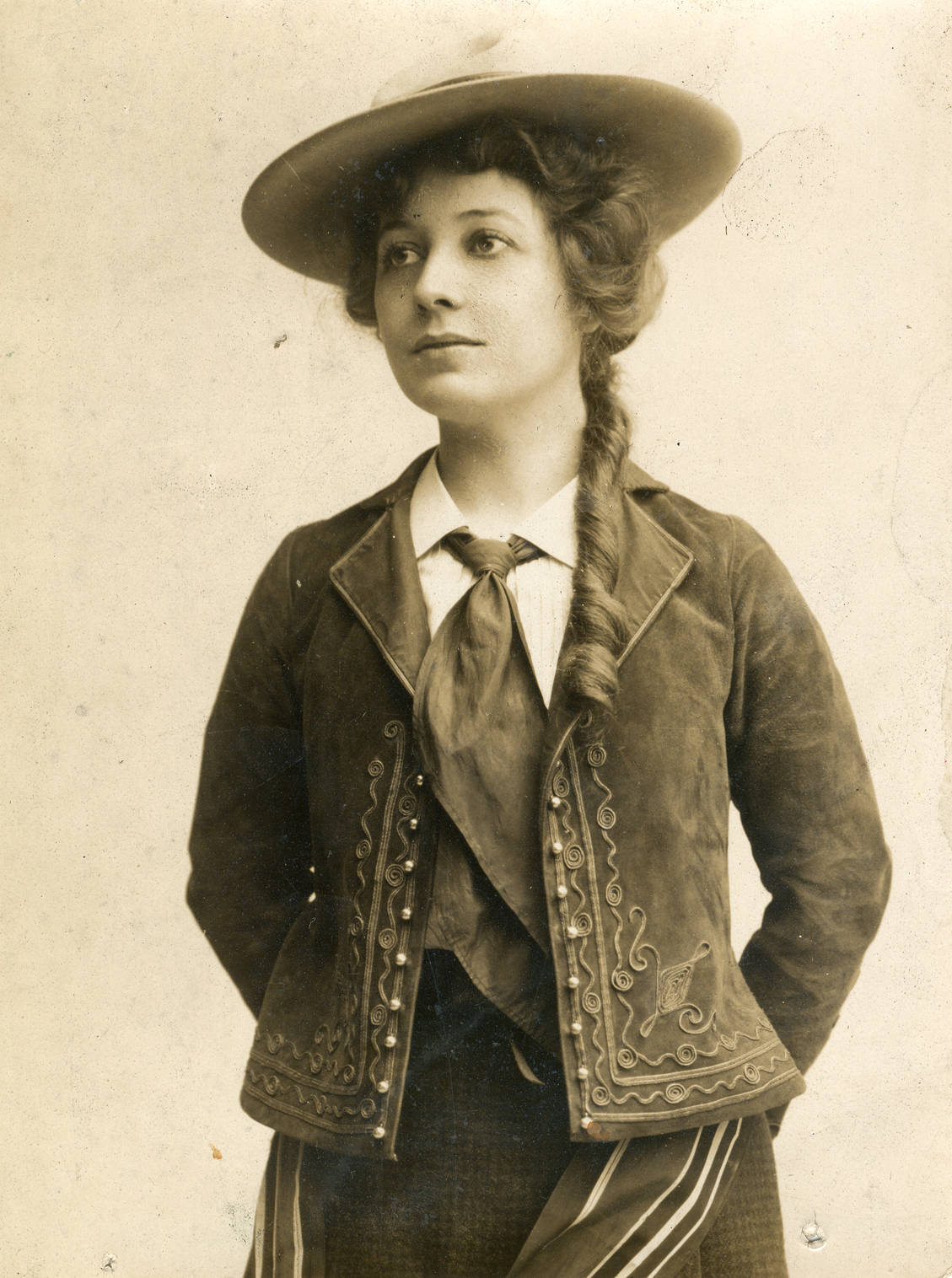
- May in 1908
- Born: November 17, 1871
- Died: July 24, 1938 (aged 66); Beverly Hills, California, U.S.
- Occupation: Actress
- Spouses: Henry Guy Carleton (m. 1894; div. 1898) John W. Albaugh Jr. (m. 1907; died 1910)

Olive May (November 17, 1871 – July 24, 1938) was an American stage actress. She appeared in the popular play Arizona and appeared in Maude Adams's company.

== Personal life ==
May was married to playwright Henry Guy Carleton from 1894 to 1898. She married actor and manager John W. Albaugh Jr. (son of John W. Albaugh) in 1907; he died in 1910.

== Death ==
May died on July 24, 1938, in Beverly Hills, California at the age of 66.

== Selected performances ==
- The Butterflies (1894) as Suzanne Elise
- The White Heather (1897) as Mollie Fanshawe
- Arizona (1899) as Bonita (Chicago debut) (Eleanor Robson took over by time of 1900 New York debut)
- Richard Carvel (1900) as Patty Swain
