= Nat Goodwin =

American actor (1857–1919)

Nat C. Goodwin
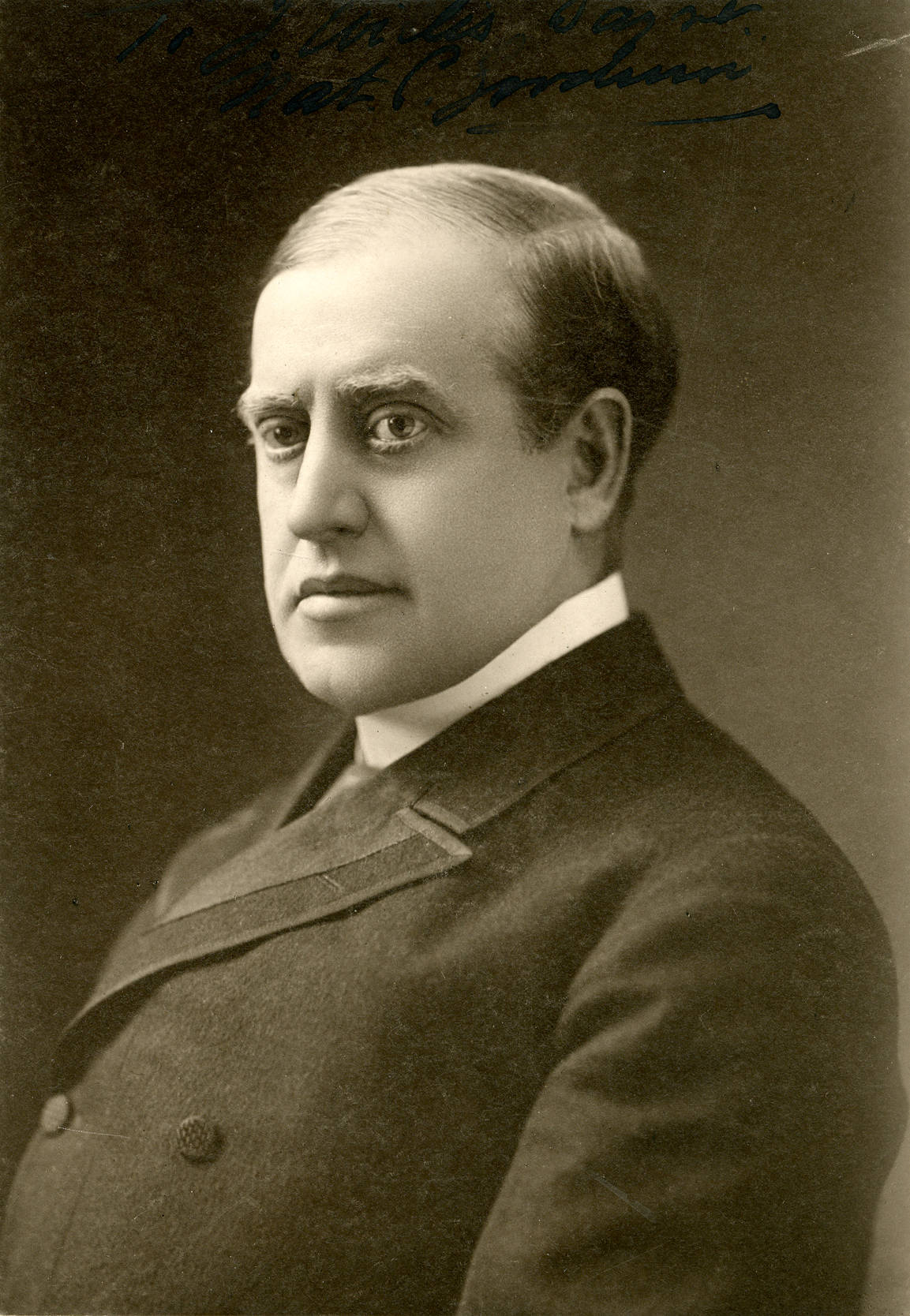
- Goodwin in 1902
- Born: Nathaniel Carl Goodwin; June 25, 1857; Boston, Massachusetts, U.S.
- Died: January 31, 1919 (aged 61); New York City, U.S.
- Resting place: Milton Cemetery, Milton, Massachusetts, U.S.
- Occupation: Actor
- Years active: 1873–1919
- Spouses: Eliza Weathersby (m. 1877; died 1887) Nella Baker Pease (m. 1890; div. 1896) Maxine Elliott (m. 1898; div. 1908) Edna Goodrich (m. 1908; div. 1911) Margaret Moreland (m. 1912; div. 1918)

Signature
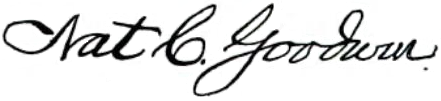

Nathaniel Carl Goodwin (July 25, 1857 – January 31, 1919) was an American male actor born in Boston. In his early career he was chiefly known for his performances in musical theatre and light opera; making his Broadway debut in a musical burlesque version of Black-Eyed Susan in 1875. He was a leading member Edward E. Rice's light opera company, The Surprise Company, from 1876 until early 1878 when he left to establish his own theatre troupe headlined by his first wife, the actress Eliza Weatherby. He toured the United States with theatre and light opera troupes in both established light opera and in roles written specifically for him over the next decade. In 1889 he switched from portraying musical theatre and opera roles into playing comedic parts in farces of the legitimate theatre; a switch which brought him fame.

== Life and career ==
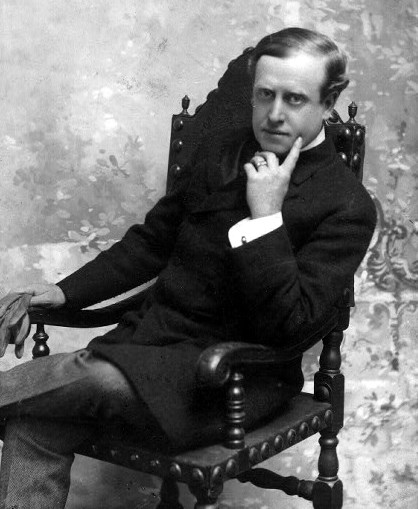
Nathaniel Carl Goodwin

While clerk in a large shop Goodwin studied for the stage and made his first appearance in 1874 at the Howard Athenaeum in Boston in Stuart Robson's company as the newsboy in Joseph Bradford's Law in New York. The next year he made his New York debut on Broadway at Tony Pastor's Opera House as Captain Crosstree in a lauded burlesque adaptation of Douglas Jerrold's Black-Eyed Susan.

The success of Black-Eyed Susan earned Goodwin a contract with Edward E. Rice's light opera company, The Surprise Company. He starred in several musicals and operettas with this group in the years 1876-1878, including Captain Dietrich in J. Cheever Goodwin's Evangeline, Yuseff in Goodwin's Le Petit Corsair, and Paidagogos in Pippins. His tenure with the company ended after a heated argument over money, and Goodwin left to establish his own theatre troupe in February 1878 which was headlined by his wife the actress Eliza Weathersby and went alternatively by the names Nat Goodwin's Froliques or Eliz Weathersby's Froliques. This group toured the country in farces of various kinds, sometimes including music and sometimes not.

In 1878, he co-founded the Boston Elks Lodge, and his association with the lodge, and that of his manager in the 1880s, George W. Floyd (né George Wood Floyd; 1853–1923), (Note: George W. Floyd (né George Wood Floyd; 1853–1923) was a Boston-born theatrical manager, known in thespian circles of his era for having been the traveling manager for Nat Goodwin for several years.) would change baseball history, giving us arguably the first role of an agent in baseball history. Floyd, in particular, would serve as a go-between, starting in 1887, between the management of the Boston National League club, the Beaneaters, and its newly signed star, Mike "King" Kelly. In 1889, Goodwin became a member of the governing committee of the newly created Actors' Amateur Athletic Association of America.

When Kelly and his Chicago teammates won the pennant in 1885, Goodwin and Floyd treated the Chicago team to a performance of "The Skating Rink" at Hooley’s Theatre in Chicago. "After the overture the orchestra struck up 'See, the Conquering Hero Comes,' and Mr. Floyd conducted the eleven Chicago players to their boxes," Chicago captain-manager Cap Anson in the lead." After the first act, Goodwin presented Anson with a "solid silver facsimile of a League ball."

For the majority of the 1880s, Goodwin toured the United States in a series of light opera and musical theatre productions. These included roles in established pieces like Sir Joseph in H.M.S. Pinafore, Lorenzo in La mascotte, Reginald Bunthorne in Patience, and Duc des Ifs in Les noces d'Olivette, and new works with part written specifically for him. It was not until 1889, however, that Nat Goodwin's talent as a comedian of the legitimate type began to be recognized. From that time he appeared in a number of plays designed to display his drily humorous method, such as Brander Matthews' and George H. Jessop's A Gold Mine, Henry Guy Carleton's A Gilded Fool and Ambition, Henry V. Esmond's When We Were Twenty-one, and others. He also found success in more serious works such as Augustus Thomas's In Mizzoura and Clyde Fitch's Nathan Hale.

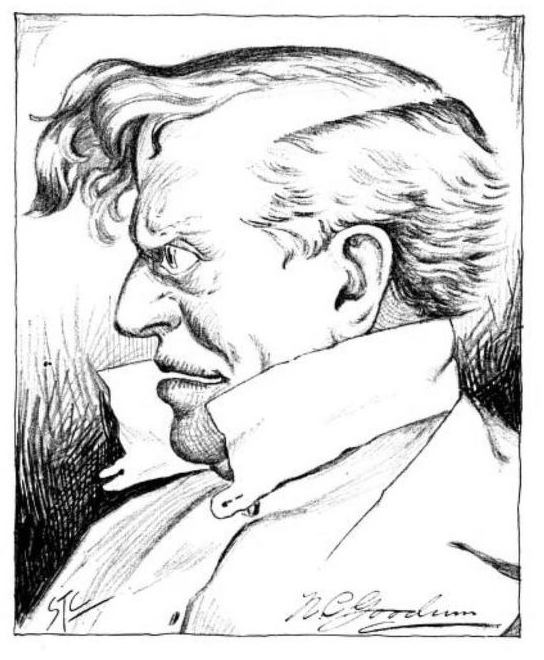
Caricature of Nat C. Goodwin as Beresford Cruger in An American Citizen by Sewell Collins, 1898.

A chance trip to Goldfield, Nevada to witness a prize fight led to Goodwin's involvement in promoting mining stocks in association with George Graham Rice. Goodwin quit his partnership with Rice shortly before the latter was arrested for mail fraud.

Perhaps Goodwin's most famous role was as Fagin in a 1912 stage adaptation of Dickens' Oliver Twist in which he appeared with Marie Doro and Constance Collier. He reprised this role for a film which still survives and is preserved in the Library of Congress. He acted in a handful of films between 1912 and 1916.

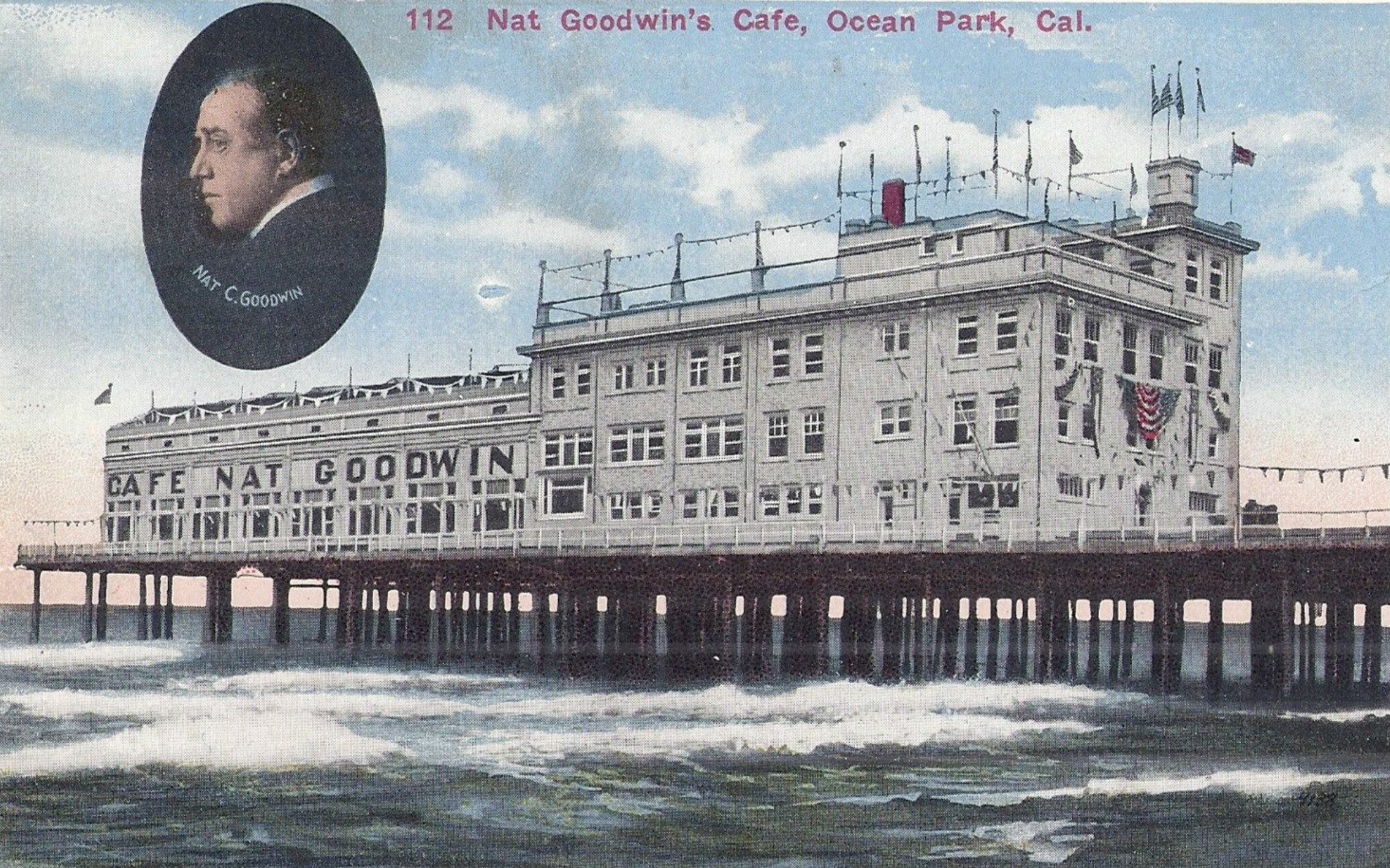
Goodwin's cafe and cabaret over the Pacific Ocean in Santa Monica, California.

Goodwin owned a cafe and cabaret, "Cafe Nat Goodwin", on the private Bristol Pier in Santa Monica, California between 1913 and 1916. After he sold the business in 1916, its name was changed to the Sunset Inn.

== Personal life ==
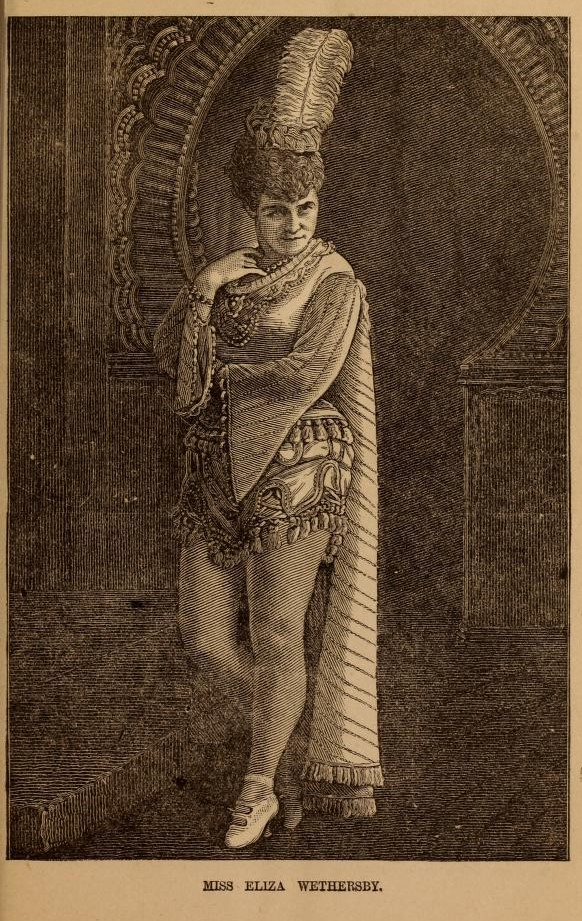
Miss Eliza Weathersby

In 1877, he married Eliza Weathersby (d. 1887), an English actress with whom he played for two seasons in Benjamin E. Woolf's Hobbies. Goodwin remarried to an actress named Nella Baker Pease (married in 1890, divorced on Jan. 19, 1898). Until 1903 he was associated in his performances with his third wife, the actress Maxine Elliott (born 1868), whom he married in 1898; this marriage was dissolved in 1908.

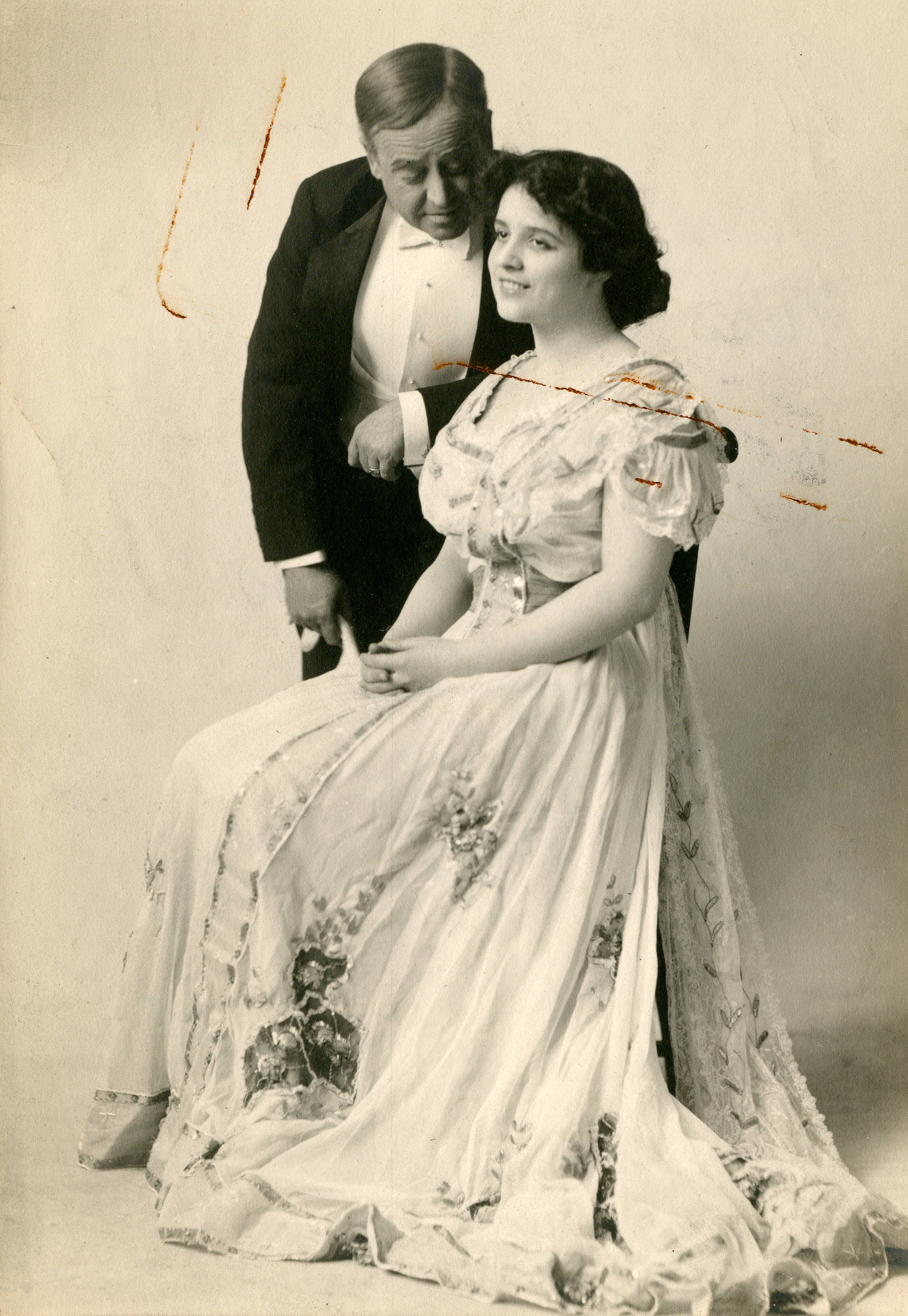
Nat Goodwin and Edna Goodrich in The Genius, 1907.

From 1905 to 1910, he partnered with Edna Goodrich in a string of comedy hits — they were married from 1908 to 1911. His last wife was the actress Margaret Moreland (married in 1912, divorced in 1918). When he died he was said to have been engaged to the actress Georgia Gardner.

== Death ==
He died in New York City, at the Claridge Hotel, from shock two weeks after having his right eye removed and was buried at Milton Cemetery in Milton, Massachusetts. He was survived by both of his parents. At the time of his death, he was deeply in debt, with his estate listing assets of $6,895 and debts of $15,000.

== Filmography ==
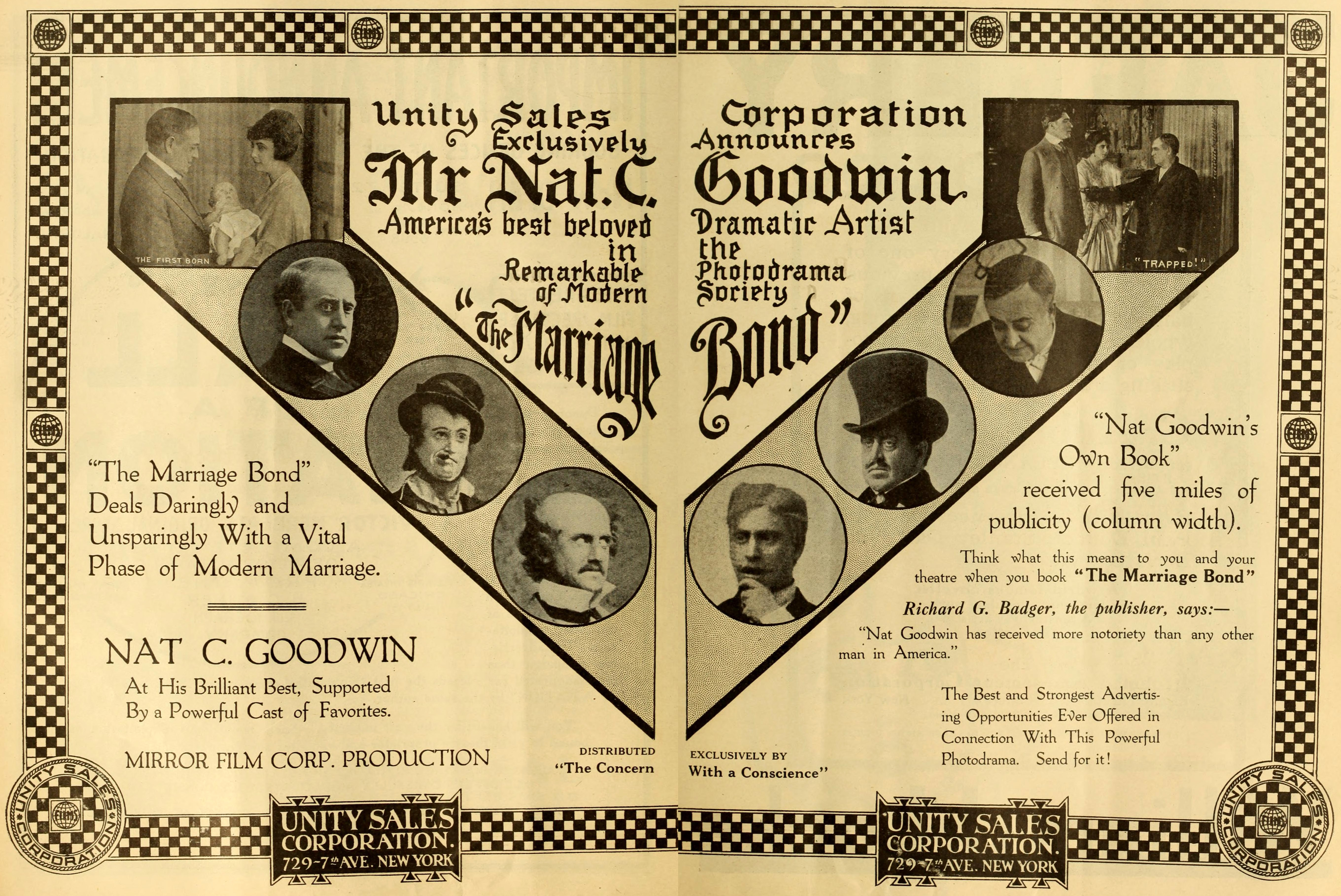
The Marriage Bond (1916)

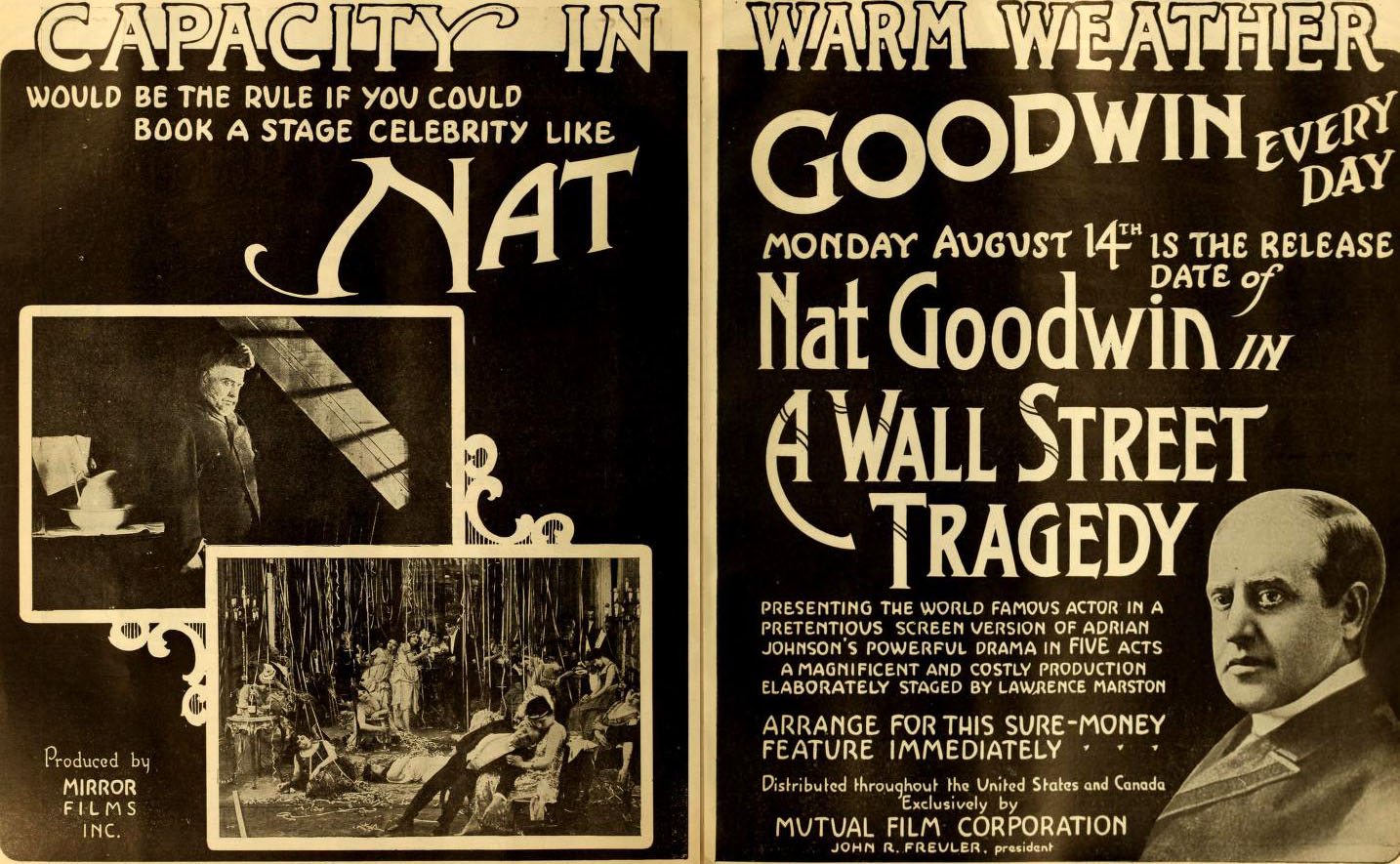
A Wall Street Tragedy (1916)

- Oliver Twist (1912)
- The Master Hand (1915)
- Business is Business (1915)
- The Marriage Bond (1916)
- A Wall Street Tragedy (1916)

== Publications ==
- Winter, The Wallet of Time, New York: Benjamin Blom, Inc. (1913); OCLC 659859703
- Strang (né Lewis Clinton Strang; 1869–1935), Famous Actors of the Day, in America, (Boston, 1900); OCLC 818975345, 1001567897
- McKay (Frederic Edward McKay) and Wingate (Charles E. L. Wingate), Famous American Actors of To-Day, Thomas Y. Crowell Co. (1896); OCLC 1020452526
- Nat Goodwin's Book (autobiography), by Nathaniel Carl Goodwin, (Boston, 1914), Boston: R.G. Badger (publisher) (Richard Gorham Badger; 1877–1937); OCLC 1069534663, 1065051031

== Notes and references ==
=== General references ===
1. This article incorporates text from a publication now in the public domain: Chisholm, Hugh, ed. (1911). "Goodwin, Nathaniel Carl". Encyclopædia Britannica. Vol. 12 (11th ed.). Cambridge University Press. p. 239.
2. Hartnoll, Phyllis (ed.), The Oxford Companion to the Theatre (4th ed.) (Oxford Companions), Oxford University Press (1985), p. 342; OCLC 59055975
3. Rosenberg, Howard W., Cap Anson 2: The Theatrical and Kingly Mike Kelly: U.S. Team Sport's First Media Sensation and Baseball's Original Casey at the Bat, Arlington, Virginia: Tile Books (2004); OCLC 608128398
