= William Gill (dramatist) =

American dramatist

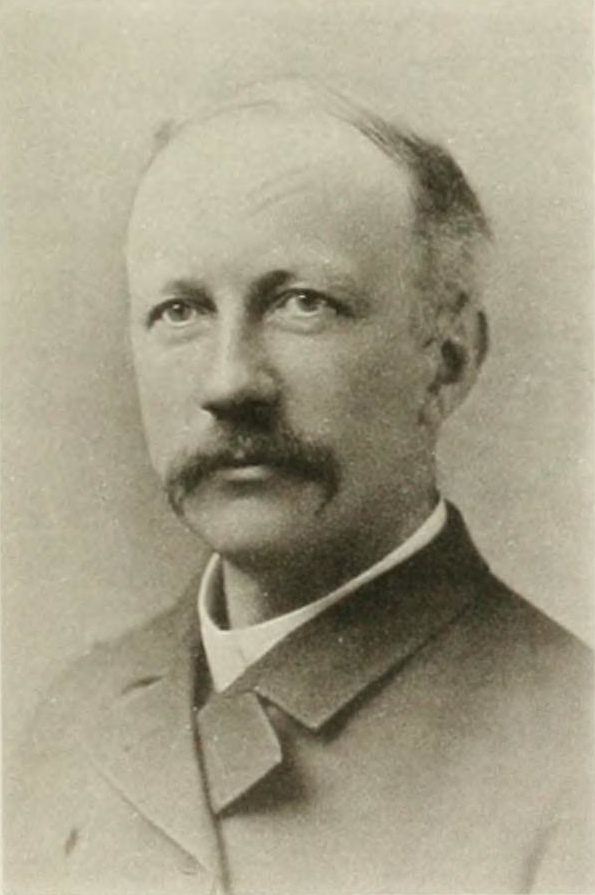
William Bain Gill

William Gill, also known as William Bain Gill, William B. Gill, and W. B. Gill, (10 May 1842, Trinity Bay, Newfoundland – 1 April 1919, Schenectady, New York) was a Newfoundland-born Australian playwright, actor, theatre critic, journalist, and theatre manager. He is most famous for authoring Broadway's first hit musical, Adonis.

William Gill was born in what is present day Canada and raised primarily in Australia, he began his acting career in 1862 at the age of twenty; working alongside his mother, the stage actress Mrs. Gill, at the Theatre Royal, Ballarat under the management of William Hoskins. The pair continued to work together during Gill's early career with theatre troupes managed by George Fawcett Rowe and G. B. W. Lewis; the latter managing a touring company in Asia. Initially an actor in minor parts, he gained a reputation as a gifted leading comedic actor in Melbourne between 1865 and 1868. He also worked briefly as the manager of the Princess Theatre, Melbourne.

After the theaters in Melbourne were closed during an economic downturn, Gill traveled to India in June 1869 with Lewis's financially profitable Calcutta based company where he remained for more than three years; ultimately replacing Lewis as the company's manager. There he married his wife and frequent stage partner, the Australian actress "Waddy" Deering (later known by the stage name Elinor Deering), in December 1869; just prior to which he had starred in the title role of his first known play, That Dear John Timothy. After returning to Australia in 1871, he became manager of first the Royal Victoria Theatre, Sydney in 1872 and then the Royal Lyceum, Sydney in 1873; presenting three more of his original plays at the Royal Lyceum. He relocated to the United States in 1874 where he became manager of Piper's Opera House in Nevada for a short time. After this he briefly managed a repertory theatre in Salt Lake City where a scandal involving copyright infringement brought Gill to the attention of the American press in February 1875. Mark Twain successfully sued to prevent an unauthorized performances of a play adaptation Gill had crafted of Twain's novel The Gilded Age: A Tale of Today.

Gill worked periodically as a journalist, theater critic, and a contributor of humorous short stories for American periodicals; particularly The Clipper. As an eyewitness news reporter, he covered the events of the gold rush in Wyoming in 1876–1877. Gill ultimately arrived in New York City as a member of Colville's Folly Company; making his Broadway debut as an actor at the Eagle Theater as the lead male comic in Oxygen, or Gas in a burlesque metre in December 1877. On Christmas Eve of that year his first stage work of sorts debuted on Broadway, the pastiche Babes In The Wood, or Who Killed Cock Robin? which Gill and Willie Edouin had co-created by splicing together excerpts of pre-existing materials by other writers, mainly pantomimes and burlesque material, into a new original format.

William Gill's first entirely original work to reach Broadway was Horrors, or the Rajah of Zogobad in 1879 which received positive if not enthusiastic reviews, and ran for a respectable 48 performances at the Union Square Theater. This began a series of several popular but critically mixed successes on Broadway, including The Magic Slipper (1879) and Our Goblins (one act version, 1879; two act version, 1881). From 1882 through 1886 he had a prolific partnership with the Irish playwright George H. Jessop with whom he co-authored many plays of which In Paradise (1882), Facts, or His Little Hatchet (1883), A Bottle of Ink (1884), and Mam'zelle, or the Little Milliner (1885) all had successful Broadway runs and tours. The pair also penned a series of flops, including Muddles (1885), Bluff (1885), and Aphrodite Still in the Ring (1886) which ultimately led to the end of their partnership in 1887.

As a playwright, Gill's plays were typically written for the talents of specific performers and for this reason the majority of his works were never re-created after the original artists ceased performing them. He had a tremendous success with the 1884 musical burlesque Adonis which was written as a starring vehicle for the actor Henry E. Dixey. The original production broke records at that time for both financial profits for a play and longest-running Broadway shows, and Dixey repeatedly returned to the role for revivals and national tours through 1899. Gill's burlesque, My Sweetheart, which was written for the actress Minnie Palmer and premiered in 1881, became an international hit with lengthy runs on the West End, the Royal Strand Theatre, the Princess's Theatre, Glasgow, and frequent touring productions in the United Kingdom, Australia, and the United States into the first decades of the twentieth century. He later penned the Broadway plays The Alderman (1897, for the actor Odell Williams), The Honest Blacksmith (1901, for the boxer-turned-actor Bob Fitzsimmons), and Mrs. 'Mac,' The Mayor (1905, for the drag artist George W. Munroe). In addition to writing several plays starring himself and his wife, Gill also created stage works for the husband and wife performing duo William J. and Malvina Pray Florence; actors Jefferson De Angelis, Richard Golden, John T. Raymond, Harry St. Maur, and Francis Wilson; actresses Hattie Starr, Eliza Weathersby, and mother and daughter Jennie and Corinne Kimball; and sopranos Marie Aimée, Ida Mülle and Dora Wiley.

== Early life: 1842-1861 ==
Born William Bain Gill on 10 May 1842, at Trinity Bay, Newfoundland, Gill was the son of William Robert Gill and Janet Bird Gill (née Bain). His father was a surgeon who had earned a place in the Membership of the Royal Colleges of Surgeons in 1835, and at some point in time prior to 1841 had settled in Newfoundland and established a surgical practice. Janet Bird Gill was the daughter of Scottish Royal Navy officer and steamship inventor and captain Sir William Bain who was knighted by Queen Victoria on 20 March 1844. Janet and William Robert were married in Cramond, Scotland on 21 August 1841 just nine month's before William's birth.

William was still living with his parents in Newfoundland as late as 1846, but the whereabouts of the family are not known until an 1852 ship record lists William and his parents as passengers on the Hope bound for Australia from Liverpool, England. William's father was also listed as the ship's doctor of record, and he oversaw 17 deaths and five births during the ships 92 day voyage. Upon arrival, the family settled in Castlemaine, Victoria with the intent of getting rich through gold speculation during the 1852 Australian gold rush.

== Early career in Australia and Asia: 1862-1868 ==
William Gill spent the early part of his career as an actor in Australia and Asia. The first record of his work as an actor was in July 1862 at the Theatre Royal, Ballarat portraying small roles in a production of Richard Brinsley Sheridan's The School for Scandal with his fellow cast mates including the actors T. S. Bellair, Henry Edwards, and William Hoskins and actresses Julia Harland and Anne Lockhart. William's mother, using the stage name Mrs. Gill, was also an actress in this production in the role of Mrs. Candour.

William Hoskins was the manager of the Theatre Royal, Ballarat at this times and both William and his mother were members of his professional company of actors. Hoskins departed from this post in December 1862, but in the five previous months that William and his mother performed in Hoskin's troupe they shared the stage with several well known performers of the 19th century; including Gustavus Vaughan Brooke, Shiel Barry, and multiple members of the Howson family; including Emma Howson and John Jerome Howson.

After the Hoskins company disbanded, both William and his mother were hired into the acting company of George Fawcett Rowe at the Princess Theatre, Melbourne; making their debuts at that theatre in 1853 in supporting roles in Fawcett's American Civil War drama North and South in 1862, or the War in Virginia. William appeared in mainly small roles in Fawcett's company that season, but did tackle his first larger part as François de Noailles in Fawcett's The Tower of London in October 1853. After the conclusion this season William and his mother once again joined the roster of players at the Theatre Royal, Ballarat in 1854 after the return of Hoskins. With this group they toured to the Lyceum Theatre in Bendigo. Among the company was the celebrated English Shakespearean actor Charles Kean, and the season included a production of Macbeth with Kean in the title role and William Gill as Seaton; a role which gained Gill his first positive reviews as a comedic actor in the press.

While William and his mother were performing in Bendigo, his father died on 11 April 1864 from "hepatitis and fatty degeneration of the heart." Shortly thereafter, economic depression in Australia led to a downturn in theatre work in that nation, and the Gills ended up leaving Australia for Asia in the touring company of G. B. W. Lewis. This tour was financially very profitable, and the company began its tour in Shanghai in 1864; and continued to perform through the end of 1865 in such locations as Hong Kong, Japan, and India. The company was notably the first theatrical group to perform a pantomime, Bell's Life in Victoria, in China.

In early 1865 William left the company of his mother to join a theatre group in South Adelaide whose company of players included the seventeen year old actress "Waddy" Deering; the daughter of actress Eliza Mossenton and the British born theatre manager and actor Henry Deering (b. 1814, London) who had a prominent career in Australia. Waddy, who was already on her second marriage and had one child, became romantically involved with William soon after they met, and it is likely that he was the biological father of her second child, Horatio Ernest Fieldwick Smith (born 6 December 1866). Shortly after the death of her second husband, Mr. Smith, William and Waddy married in Calcutta, India at the Great Eastern Hotel on 20 December 1868.

Prior to his marriage, William's career as a celebrated actor in Australia blossomed, particularly in comedies, between 1865 and 1868. This started with several critical triumphs at George Coppin's Haymarket Theatre, Melbourne. His roles there included the Vizier in Lord Byron's Aladdin; Winterbottom in the Australia premiere of Dion Boucicault's Arrah-na-Pogue; Lord Buckhurst in Court and Stage; Zimple Zimon in the Christmas pantomime The Four Champions of Beautee; David in The Rivals, and Sam in The Ticket of Leave Man. After this he performed in a minstrel show at a music hall in Melbourne called the Varieties organized by Edward Harvey that was a starring vehicle for the American actress Rollin Howard. He then returned to the Haymarket, now under the management of Hoskins, where he starred in several Shakespeare productions alongside the actor James Robertson Anderson. Gill had particular success as Rodrigo in Othello with Anderson in the title role and Robert Heir as Iago. This was followed by leading roles in several comedies, including Captain Crosstree in Black-Eyed Susan (with Kate Denin in the title role), the hairdresser in Thomas Egerton Wilks' comedy How's Your Uncle?, and the Demon Dwarf in the Christmas pantomime Harlequin Rumpelstiltskin, or the Demon Dwarf of the Goblin Gold Mine and the Prince and Miller's Daughter.

In 1867 Gill's first known work, the four page monograph A Comic History of Victoria, was premiered by the author in Melbourne. Inspired by the humorist Gilbert Abbott à Beckett's A Comic History of England, the work is very reminiscent of Beckett's style of writing In 1868 he became the manager of the Princess Theatre, Melbourne. He continued to perform at both the Princess and Haymarket Theatres in such roles as Polyphemus in Acis and Galatea, Caleb Plummer in The Cricket on the Hearth, Widow Twankay in Aladdin, Joe Smith in The Water Witches, and, his most celebrated part, the title role in Rip Van Winkle. Both theaters ended up closing by the summer of 1868 due to financial difficulties; a recurring problem at the vast majority of theaters in Australia at this time in history.

== Career in India, 1868-1871 ==
In June 1868 Gill departed for India; once again with a company managed by G. B. W. Lewis. Among the company of actors was Gill's soon to be bride "Waddy" Deering; Tilly Earl; Lewis's wife, the actress "Mrs. Lewis"; Lizzie Naylor; and brothers John & Charles Edouin. The company spent the remainder of 1868 in residence in Calcutta where they were financially very successful. The company's repertoire in this first season included Caste, The Green Bushes, Black-Eyed Susan, Leah, The Child of the Regiment, The Octoroon, Aladdin, Arrah-na-Pogue, The Ticket of Leave Man, and The Flying Scud (with Gill as Nat Grosling). The city of Calcutta did not have a permanent theatre built at this point and time, so the company used a temporary structure built from corrugated wood and iron that could seat up to 6,000 people which they could dismantle to avoid damage during inclement weather.

The company remained in Calcutta for the first several months of 1869; presenting a second season of works which included the plays The Merchant of Venice (with William as Shylock), Hamlet, Much Ado About Nothing, London Assurance (with William as Meddle), Caste, The School for Scandal, Mary Turner, Fraud and its Victims, or The Streets of London, Richielu, The Little Devil, Lady Audley's Secret, The Mountain Sylph, Lend me Five Shillings, The Sea of Ice, Cure for the Fidgets, and Rip Van Winkle (William in the title role). This season also included the first known play penned by William Gill; the farce That Dear John Timothy, with Gill portraying the title character; a work which was well received in the Calcutta press.

In May 1869 Gill and the rest of Lewis's company embarked on the beginning of a five month long tour of India. Beginning in Shimla, the company made stops in both larger cities like Bombay, and more smaller remote locations such as the hill station Mussoorie. Most of the tour took place in India's Northwestern provinces where the company traveling more than 1,700 miles along their tour. While overall financially successful, the troupe endured difficult weather with first an unprecedented heat wave and then a challenging rainy season. By the time the company returned to Calcutta in September 1869 they were relieved to be finished with the tour. After this the company presented two more seasons in Calcutta; one in the autumn of 1869, and the other in the spring of 1870.

In April 1870 Lewis announced he would not be continuing with the enterprise in India, and the troupe of actors elected William Gill to replace him as manager. They continued to perform in India for one more year under Gill's management but failed to continue with the success they had achieved under Lewis's leadership. This was largely due to Gill's hiring mainly Australian actors for the season, and foregoing the hiring of top British talent. While the actors were just as skilled, critics and audiences complained that the actors lacked the British pedigree that they had become accustomed to when Lewis was in charge.

== Return to Australia, 1871-1874 ==
No longer able to sustain the company financially, the Calcutta troupe disbanded in October 1871, and Gill and his wife returned to Australia; this time residing in Sydney. In that city the couple appeared in productions of Laughing Faces and Flights of Fancy at the Sydney School of Arts in the first few months of 1872. However, their stay in Sydney was brief, and in March 1872 the couple relocated to Hill End, New South Wales, then another Gold Rush boom town, where Gill established a theatre of sorts entitled the 'Great Varieties Hall'. In actuality, this "theatre" was housed in a non-permanent structure canvas tent. While the prospective theatre company started off well, the venture ultimately failed when the gold boom dried up, and the town shrank back to its normal size in a matter of months.

Gill and his family returned to Sydney and he quickly gained work in 1872 managing the Royal Victoria Theatre, Sydney. There he befriended the Irish-American actor James Carden (1837-c.1917) who was the leading talent at that theatre. When Carden decided to depart the theatre just two months after Gill arrived, Gill decided to go with him and the two began a residence at the Theatre Royal, Brisbane. There Gill and Waddie gained a high degree of popularity with the public, and became the main entertainment attraction in the city; eclipsing Carden as the stars.

The couple departed the Royal Victoria three months later to begin a residence at the Royal Lyceum, Sydney with Gill as the new manager. The newly remodeled theatre was renamed the Queen's Theatre at this time and re-opened on 25 October 1873 with performances of The Farmyard of Grove Farm and The Goldfield on the Macquarie; local plays with no accredited authors. The theatre's season included many popular contemporary plays of the period, and also a well-received original Christmas pantomime penned by Gill, Harlequin Man in the Moon, or Luna the Lovely, Phaeton the Fair and the Haggravating Hag of the Hupper Hatmosphere, which utilized music taken from Offenbach's Geneviève de Brabant and contained a great deal of local humor parodying Sydney's politicians and other contemporary public figures of this city. In this work Gill starred as Larrikinos, the comical Man in the Moon, and Waddy portrayed the roles of both 'Prince Phaeton' and 'Olly as the evil "dame" Malignata'. This is one of the few plays by Gill to have survived, as the Sydney publishing house Gorman & Riordan published the work in 1873.

Following the success of this play, Gill oversaw the Queen's Theatre for one more season in the Spring of 1874. During this season the theatre staged two more original plays by Gill: the comedy Ups and Downs, or Uncle Thomas's Money and the burlesque Mephistopheles DDD, or Faust and his Fair Marguerite. The latter production, which closed 28 April 1874, was Gill's last appearance in Australia before his relocation to the United States.

== Nevada and Wyoming:1874-1877 ==
William Gill and his wife and children left Australia for California on 12 May 1874; boarding a vessel operated by the Pacific Mail Steamship Company, and ultimately arriving in the United States via the port city of San Francisco. Waddie adopted the stage name Rose Bain when she and William made their United States stage debut at Piper's Opera House in Virginia City, Nevada on 28 September 1874 starring in a production of Watts Phillips' A golden fetter. After this William took over the management of Piper's Opera House, where the couple spent the next several months performing in plays.

The Gills left Piper's Opera House and spent a brief time performing and managing a repertory theatre company in Salt Lake City in 1875. A scandal over copyright infringement erupted during this time, and brought William Gill's names into news headlines for negative reasons in February 1875. William had announced as part of the Salt Lake season a stage adaptation of Mark Twain and Charles Dudley Warner's 1873 novel The Gilded Age, but had not obtained permission from the authors to adapt the work. Twain, who was highly protective of any public performances of his works and had already made plans for the actor John T. Raymond to perform a stage version, took William Gill and the Piper's Opera House to court and obtained an injunction barring the theatre's performances. When audiences arrived for the opening night of the planned performances of The Guilded Age, Deputy U.S. Marshall A. K. Smith enforced the court's injunction and the event was canceled at the very last moment.

After this embarrassing event, William obtained periodic employment working as a correspondent for The Clipper in 1876–1877; writing mainly as theatre critic and entertainment reporter but also on the events of the Black Hills Gold Rush. During this time, William and his family moved to the city of Laramie in Wyoming Territory where the Gills were employed at the National Theatre. In Laramie the Gill's daughter Rose was born and she was christened at the Episcopal Church in that city in October 1876. In 1877, William's writings for The Clipper indicate that he was in Cheyenne, Wyoming and its surrounding region for his eyewitness coverage of the events of the gold rush during its peak. William also contributed several humorous short stories which were published in The Clipper and other American periodicals in the late 1870s.

== Colville's Folly Company and initial work on Broadway: 1877-1881 ==
By September 1877, the Gills had left Wyoming and were appearing in a musical burletta at the Metropolitan Theater in Newark, New Jersey. The following November they were performing at Henry Ward Beecher's Newark Opera House. The following month, William but not Waddie, had been offered a place in Colville's Folly Company with whom he made his New York City and Broadway debut as the lead male comic in Oxygen, or Gas in a burlesque metre at the Eagle Theater, on 15 December 1877. This was followed by the Babes In The Wood, or Who Killed Cock Robin?; a pastiche work co-adapted by William Gill and Willie Edouin which premiered on Broadway on Christmas Eve 1877; playing for a total of 25 performance at the Eagle Theatre. The work contained excerpts of materials from a variety of sources by other writers but put together in an original way. While neither writer claimed authorship, it was Gill's first stage work where he was a primary creative presence staged on Broadway.

After this, Babes in the Woods went on tour where it had an enthusiastic reception at the Globe Theatre in Boston; with the management of the theatre extending the show's run beyond what had initially been planned. During the tour, Waddy joined the cast of this production in the role of the governess; this time using the stage name Elinor Deering (the name she would use for the rest of her career). Gill succeeded Edouin as the leading male talent in the production after leaving Boston when Edouin was poached by a rival Boston based theatre impresario Edward E. Rice.

Colville's Folly Company's 1877-1878 tour also included performances of other repertoire; notably a new adaptation of Henry James Byron's Cinderella penned by Gill entitled Our Cinderella. When H.M.S. Pinafore became a hit on the American stage in 1878, the company added that work to their repertoire in an un-authorized version adapted by the comic Gus Williams known as The Schooner Pinafore with William Gill portraying Captain Corcoran and Williams performing the role of Sir Joseph Porter. Other stops along the tour included the Grand Opera House, New York, the Arch Street Theatre in Philadelphia, the Park Theatre on Broadway, and the Adelphi Theater in Chicago.

While the Gills were starring with the Colville Company on tour, Rice's theatre troupe presented the world premiere of a new burlesque written by William Gill entitled Horrors, or the Rajah of Zogobad. The work starred Willie Edouin and it premiered on 10 October 1878 at the Milwaukee Opera House. Rice's troop then toured the work to Haverly's Theatre in Chicago, followed by performances in San Francisco and Philadelphia before it reached Broadway's Union Square Theater on 28 May 1879 where it was received favorably if not enthusiastically by the New York press. It ran on Broadway for 48 performances before Rice's company continued on their tour elsewhere. The work remained in the Rice company's repertoire for several years.

For the British actress Eliza Weathersby, Gill penned a new musical, The Ramblers, which premiered at Pike's Opera House, San Francisco on 3 March 1879. This work became part of the repertoire of a new company co-founded by Gill and theatre manager Frank J. Pilling in the autumn of 1879. The repertoire of this new company also included another new musical by Gill, Our Goblins, which the Gill & Pilling Pleasure Company presented in its world premiere on 17 November 1879, at the Olympic Theatre in Chicago. The music for the production was created by the violinist and composer George Loesch (b. 1846), and the work starred Gill as Benjamin Franklin Cobb with Waddy portraying "'his better half' Mrs. B. F. Cobb" using the stage name Elinor Deering. The cast also included the actor Francis Wilson as Alfred Comstock Silvermine of Leadville, Amy Gordon as Tillie St. Aubyn, and Augustus J Bruno as Octavius Longfellow Warbler.

Our Goblins was a popular success, and the Gill's toured the United States in this production for a period of more than two years before ultimately disbanding the Pilling and Gill theatre company in January 1883. The popularity of the work was such that Gill penned a musical sequel in the midst of the original work's tour, Our Goblins at Home; Society in a Nutshell, or Piqued Out of Divorce. This work premiered at the Academy of Music in Reading, Pennsylvania on 14 February 1881. Ultimately, the decision was made to combine the best of both productions into a composite new version entitled Our Goblins; or, Fun on the Rhine, and it was this composite version that was performed on Broadway at the Fourteenth Street Theatre where it opened on 21 March 1881.

After Gill and Pilling's original production of Our Goblins closed, the work continued to be performed by other theatre troops in late 19th century into the 20th century; with a particularly notable production being staged by the touring company of W. G. Tarkington in 1902. The work was also staged by William Forrester at the Theatre Royal, Cheltenham in England in 1882; a production which toured to Gloucester and Leicester.

== 'My Sweetheart' and partnership with George H. Jessop: 1881-1887 ==
In the midst of the Our Goblins tour, Gill introduced and starred in another musical farce, A Gay Time at Whymple's, which premiered in Albany, New York on 7 January 1882. This musical failed to recreate the success of Our Goblins and remained in the Pilling and Gill company's repertoire for only a brief period. Much more successful, however, was a musical Gill created for the actress Minnie Palmer, My Sweetheart, which premiered at Shattuck's Opera House in Hornellsville, New York on 27 August 1881. This work toured the United States for two years before embarking on a tremendously successful tour of Europe and Australia which made Palmer an internationally acclaimed actress, and became Gill's most successful stage work outside of the United States. It had a lengthy run in London's West End, and was popular enough that Palmer repeatedly returned to the role for more than two decades. She was still starring in a production of the work at the Perth Theatre in February 1907, more than 25 years after the play premiered.

The Irish born playwright George H. Jessop was one of several writers who had a hand in making alterations to My Sweetheart during its lengthy life on the stage. Other writers who made changes to the work included Fred Maeder and Clay Greene. Jessop had achieved fame earlier with his tremendously successful 1879 play Sam'l of Posen; or, The Commercial Drummer which brought both fortune and fame to its star, the actor M. B. Curtis, who toured in the title role for decades. In 1882 he began a prolific partnership with William Gill; beginning with the commercially successful play, In Paradise (1882) which they created as a starring vehicle for the actor John T. Raymond. It had a successful national tour which included two different runs in New York City; first at the Grand Opera House and later at Broadway's Windsor Theater. Other stops on the tour included performances at the Grand Opera House, St. Louis, the Park Theatre, Brooklyn, and McVicker's Theater in Chicago among other playhouses. This was the first of several successful works co-authored by Jessop and Gill.

Jessop's second collaboration with Gill was the play An Old Stager or, That Angel Mac which they co-authored for the husband and wife acting team William J. Florence and Malvina Pray Florence for performance at the Holliday Street Theater in Baltimore in March 1883. They authored a second play for the pair, Facts, or His Little Hatchet, which was given its premiere at the Walnut Street Theater in Philadelphia in September 1883. This second play was tremendously profitable and became the greatest success for the Florences in their acting careers; remaining in their regularly performed repertoire for the next six years including multiple runs at Broadway theatres.

In 1884 Gill and Jessop experienced their first critical failure with the 1884 play Stolen Money. An adaptation of Charles Reade's 1884 novel Single Heart and Double Face, the work was skewered in reviews published by the New York press. The pair rebounded from this failure later that year with a popular success, writing the libretto for the musical A Bottle of Ink which premiered in late 1884 in Boston before reaching Broadway's Comedy Theater in January 1885. The work received critical reviews but was financially profitable, and it starred soprano Ida Mülle, the comic actor Jefferson De Angelis, and the actress Hattie Starr. This work followed soon after by the libretto for Mam'zelle, or the Little Milliner, which was the first English language work starring the French soprano Marie Aimée who was the leading star of French-language operetta on the American stage during the 19th century. This work premiered on 5 September 1884 in Kingston, New York and toured to Syracuse, Buffalo, Rochester, and Brooklyn before finally settling in for a profitable run at Broadway's Fifth Avenue Theater. The work later became a successful vehicle for Jennie Kimball's opera company who toured widely in the work after purchasing the rights to the piece following Aimée's death in 1887. It was revived on Broadway in 1888 with Alice Harrison in the title part.

On 2 March 1885, Gill and Jessop's supposedly original play Muddles premiered at the Imperial Theatre in London in a production produced by and starring the actor Harry St. Maur who later performed the work again in a run at the Prince of Wales Theatre, Liverpool. In reality, the work contained a significant portion of material authored by Gill earlier for his 1884 musical flop Two Bad Men which he had created in collaboration with the composer Gustave Kerker for the American stage. Jessop was presumably brought in to assist in an attempted rescue of this failed work by altering it into a farce for the London stage in which it was retitled Muddles. The London press ridiculed the work, and Muddles was the first of a series of flops suffered by the Jessop and Gill creative partnership. These included two failures on the American stage: Bluff (1885) and Aphrodite Still in the Ring (1886); the final stage works co-authored by Jessop and Gill that were performed.

By 1887 Gill and Jessop's partnership had dissolved and the two men were no longer on good terms with one another. In April 1887 newspapers announced the future staging of a play in San Francisco that was credited to Jessop, The Noblest Roman of Them All. This announcement angered Gill who wrote a public letter denouncing Jessop for not including his name as one of the primary authors of the work. That play was never performed. A planned new work by the Gill and Jessop creative team for the actress Leonora Bradley was supposed to premiere in London in the summer of 1887 but was abandoned and never materialized.

== Henry E. Dixey and Adonis ==
During his years working with Jessop, Gill continued to write for the stage on his own; mostly with mixed success. These works included the burlesque Little Heindrick Hudson or, the Merry Dutch of Manhattan which ran at Tony Pastor's Music Hall in January 1884, and Distinguished Foreigners which premiered at the Globe Theatre in Boston in 1883 in conjunction with a production of Joseph Derrick's Confusion which had alterations made to its script for the American stage by Gill. This latter pairing starred Henry E. Dixey, and Gill's contribution to the double work was created in order to give Dixon an opportunity to portray his comedic parody of the actor Henry Irving. This double bill reached Broadway's Fifth Avenue Theater on 28 January 1884; and, while drawing praise for Dixey's performance, received little acknowledgment for Gill's contributions as a playwright.

The next collaboration between Gill and Dixey, the musical Adonis, became the crowning achievement of both men's careers. While Gill had several early popular and financial successes in the American theatre, his works consistently were met with mixed critical reviews until he penned Adonis. This included My Sweetheart, which was a critical success internationally but not as well reviewed in the United States itself. Gill's Adonis began playing on Broadway in 1884 and ran for an unprecedented 603 performances, becoming the longest running show in Broadway history up until that time and the first Broadway show to run for at least 500 performances. At its peak, Adonis earned approximately $7,000 per week in box office sales (the equivalent of over $250,000 in 2011 dollars).

== Career after Adonis: 1884-1905 ==
=== A series of mainly failures ===
Gill was never able to recreate the success of Adonis, and this work was followed by a series of flops, including the original works Two Bad Men (1884), Capers, or Fun in a Boarding School (1884), Muddles (1885), Bluff (1885), and Aphrodite Still in the Ring (1886); most of them written with Jessop. Another stage failure included a revised version of Fred Eustis's Penny Ante which was retitled A Modern Venus (1885) after Gill significantly altered the piece in an unsuccessful attempt to rescue the work for Eustis and Ben Tuthill's theatre troupe.

Gill's unlucky streak was temporarily broken with a modest success in the play Buttons which premiered at the Howard Opera House in Burlington, Vermont on 17 August 1885. Written for the husband and wife acting team Tony and Gertie Hart, the work toured for a year. This piece was followed by one of Gill's most harshly reviewed works, Chestnuts (later retitled Mugwumps), which debuted to scathing reviews in New Britain, Connecticut on 2 November 1885. This work had been thrown together rapidly for the husband and wife performing team of actor Richard Golden and soprano Dora Wiley, and was a poor imitation of Gill's earlier A Bottle of Ink. He recycled the plot from these works again in a third work, the farce A Toy Pistol, which was another work Gill crafted for the Harts. After this third play began its run at Broadway's Comedy Theater on 20 February 1886, Golden complained to the press that the work was his because of its close similarities to Chestnuts. However, A Toy Pistol was altered several times during its Broadway run, and proved to be another successful year-long touring work for the Harts.

Gill also crafted a second play for William J. Florence and Malvina Pray Florence, The Flirt, which premiered in the autumn of 1886 and was a modest success. It remained in their repertoire through 1888.

=== 'Arcadia' and the Kimballs ===
After the original Broadway production of Adonis closed in April 1886, it was replaced at the Bijou Theatre by another play authored by Gill, the children's pantomime Arcadia, which had previously debuted three weeks earlier at the Bijou Theatre in Boston. The central character of this play was Tom (portrayed by the actress Lizzie St. Quinten), taken from the nursery rhyme "Tom, Tom, the Piper's Son". Gill also directed and starred in this play as the Piper; and earned excellent reviews for his acting but less than stellar reviews for his writing. Theatre critic Earl Marble wrote in the Boston Mirror,

"The Piper of William Gill was one of the best bits of acting in the whole affair which affords a new illustration of the old fact that a man may be a bad playwright and a good actor."

With such an assessment, Arcadia only lasted three weeks its first run on Broadway, and its original cast was disbanded. However, Arcadia found new life in the hands of Jennie Kimball who purchased the work from Gill as a starring vehicle for her daughter Corinne Kimball. The piece was significantly reworked and was given a better quality production with more expensive costumes and sets. It was ultimately a financial and popular success for Corrine and the Kimball company who toured in the work for several years. However, the composer of the music for Arcadia, John Joseph Braham Sr., sued the Kimball as he had never been paid by them for the rights to the music to the work. Ultimately Arcadia returned to New York in January 1888, with the Kimball company being warmly reviewed in their revised version for performances at the Third Avenue Theater and Dockstader's Theater. The run lasted significantly longer than the production's first New York staging.

Arcadia was reworked for the Kimball company again in 1892 by Gill and the composer Richard Stahl for performances in Philadelphia. It is this version that was performed by the Kimball company at the World's Columbian Exposition on 7 May 1893; a work that was also presented alongside another play by Gill, Spider and Fly. Corinne Kimball also starred in another play by Gill that year, Hendrik Hudson, which premiered on 12 August 1893.

=== 'The Alderman', 'My Boys', 'A Royal Tramp', and 'Old Jed Prouty' ===
Gill wrote two plays which premiered in 1887, The Alderman and My Boys. The Alderman was written for the character actor Odell Williams who starred as the corrupt New York politician Andrew McSlathers. It premiered at the Park Theater in Philadelphia on 3 May 1897 and had some of the best critical reviews of Gill's career as a playwright in the Philadelphia press. The New York press likewise gave a warm reception of the work when it opened at Broadway's 14th Street Theater on 24 May 1897. After its Broadway run ended, the show was performed in Pittsburgh in September 1897.

The farce My Boys was created for the comedy duo of George Richards and Eugene Canfield. It debuted at the Lyceum Theater in Elizabeth, New Jersey on 21 August 1897. The production then toured throughout New England before ultimately arriving at New York's Manhattan Theater for a two-week run that began on 18 December 1897.

In late 1887 Waddy Gill became seriously ill with pneumonia and Gill temporarily abandoned playwriting during this period; making a living by selling liquor. In 1888 Gill directed the New York production of Alfred Thompson's The Arabian Nights; a work which had a tremendously successful original production at the Chicago Opera House in 1887. As with most of Gill's efforts, it was popular but not critical success. He finally returned to writing for the stage by penning the libretto to composer Charles Puerner's light opera A Royal Tramp which premiered to negative reviews in Baltimore at Albaugh's Lyceum on 22 January 1889 followed by even worse reviews during a run in Philadelphia.

A Royal Tramp was followed by a much better reviewed work, the four act comedy drama Old Jed Prouty, which Gill co-authored with Richard Golden. It premiered to good reviews at the opera house in Bangor, Maine, on 22 April 1889 and successfully toured New England and to Philadelphia, before reaching New York's Union Square Theater on 13 May 1889. New York reception of the work was luke-warm, with the piece being described as well crafted and acted but dismissed as a derivative work with nothing new to add to the theatre canon. However, Old Jed Prouty, was a popular success for Golden who continued to tour widely in the role through 1902; after which the actor Robert Craig toured in the part from 1902 to 1904. Golden also adapted the play into a novel, Old Jed Prouty, a narrative of the Penobscot, with the writer Mary C. Francis and it was published by G. W. Dillingham Co. in 1901.

=== 'The Seven Ages' ===
Gill re-teamed with Henry E. Dixey and Adonis producer Edward E. Rice in the hopes of re-creating the success from their previous partnership. The resulting work was the musical The Seven Ages which opened at Broadway's Standard Theater on 7 October 1889. The libretto was co-authored by Gill and Dixey. While not achieving the degree of success as their prior collaboration, it had a respectable run of 152 performances; closing on 15 February 1890.

=== Later plays ===
Gill's last Broadway plays were Miss Blythe of Duluth (1892), The Rising Generation (1893), The Honest Blacksmith (1901), and Mrs. 'Mac,' The Mayor (1905). The Honest Blacksmith was created for the boxer Bob Fitzsimmons who following his career as a boxer attempted a career as an actor. The work premiered in Kingston, New York, on 30 October 1900, and toured in regional theaters before ultimately arriving at Broadway's Star Theater on 21 January 1901 where it played to packed houses. The play continued to tour nationally until 1903 when Fitzsimmons returned to boxing.

Gill adapted Charles Clark Munn's short story'Uncle Terry-a Story of the Maine Coast (1900), into the play Uncle Terry which toured throughout New England in 1901 but never reached Broadway. His next play, Mrs. Mac, the Mayor, was written for the comic George W. Monroe who performed the title role in drag. This work premiered in Troy, New York on 9 November 1904 and toured for a year successfully; including a stop at New York's Metropolis Theater. It was Gill's last play to receive a professional staging.

Other later plays that Gill penned which never made it to Broadway included The New Nabobs (premiered 3 October 1893, Dover, New Hampshire) and A Fatted Calf (premiered at the H. R. Jacobs Theater, Newark, on 15 April 1895).

== Later life and death ==
With the proceeds of Adonis, the Gills purchased a home at 2007 Vyse Ave. in the Bronx sometime in the mid-1880s. They were still living in this home at the time of the 1910 United States census. Sometimes during their time in the Bronx, William Gill's mother Janet left Australia and moved in with her son's family. In 1889 Janet opened a candy store in the Bronx at 1705 Fordham Avenue; a business which later moved to 4005 Third Avenue. She continued to operate that store until shortly before her death at the age of 79 in the Bronx at 1281 Tremont Avenue on 18 December 1899. Gill worked as an "inspector of highways" to supplement his income beginning around c. 1900; a role he continued in for over a decade.

By 1912, the Gills were no longer living in the Bronx but had moved into the home of their daughter May and her husband, Bert L. Atkinson in Schenectady, New York. Atkinson was a longtime employee of the General Electric Company who had begun his career as a draughtsman but was at this time an administrator. Waddy and William lived with May and Bert for the last nine years of their lives during which time William was still writing. His last known stage work, the musical PGF (Pretty Good Fun) for which he wrote the lyrics, was staged by an amateur group at the Van Curler Opera House in Schenectady in 1912.

Waddy Gill died in Schenectady from a stroke on 25 February 1919 after having been in ill health for a year previously. William Gill died just four days later of intestinal cancer in Schenectady on 1 April 1919 at the age of 76. They are both buried at Park View Cemetery in Schenectady. William Gill's granddaughter, the youngest daughter of Horace Gill, was the novelist Patricia Gill Murphy (d. 2013) who was also a professor of linguistics, history and education at the University of the Virgin Islands.

== Bibliography ==
- Fisher, James (2015). "Gill, William B. (1842–1919)". Historical Dictionary of American Theater: Beginnings. Rowman & Littlefield. p. 193. ISBN 9780810878334.
- Ganzl, Kurt (2002). William B. Gill: From the Goldfields to Broadway. Routledge. doi:10.4324/9780203953228. ISBN 9780415937672.
- TNYT (22 November 1885). "The Stage and Box Office" (PDF). New York Times.
