= Wieting Opera House =

Performance hall in Syracuse, New York

Coordinates: 43°3′1″N 76°9′9″W

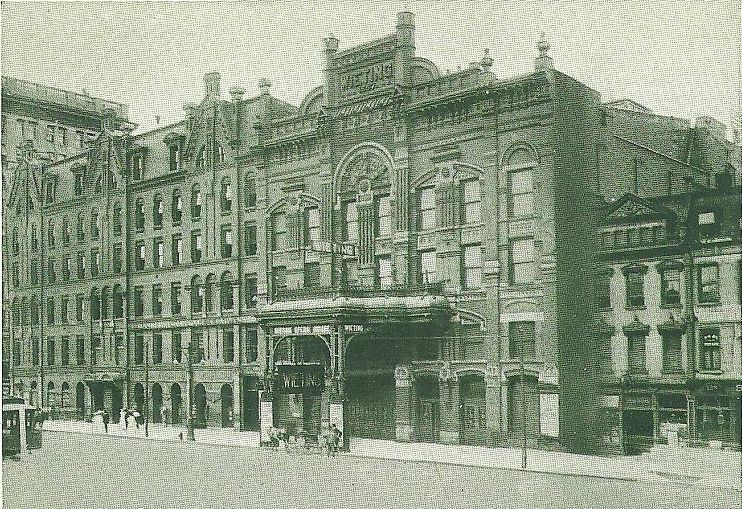
The Wieting Opera House c. 1905

The Wieting Opera House was a performance hall in Syracuse, New York, that hosted operas, films, and other performances from 1852 to 1930. The building's first iteration was funded by John Wieting and known as Wieting Hall. It burnt down after four years, in 1856. Wieting rebuilt the hall that year, and in 1870 renovated it into an opera house.

Towards the end of the 19th century, the opera house was a major theater in the Eastern United States and held test performances of shows that were bound for performance on Broadway in New York City. The opera house burnt down in 1881 and 1896, and was rebuilt both times, the second time by Wieting's wife, Mary Elizabeth Wieting. The opera house began showing movies in the early 20th century, and closed in 1930, when it was replaced with a parking garage.

== Wieting Hall ==
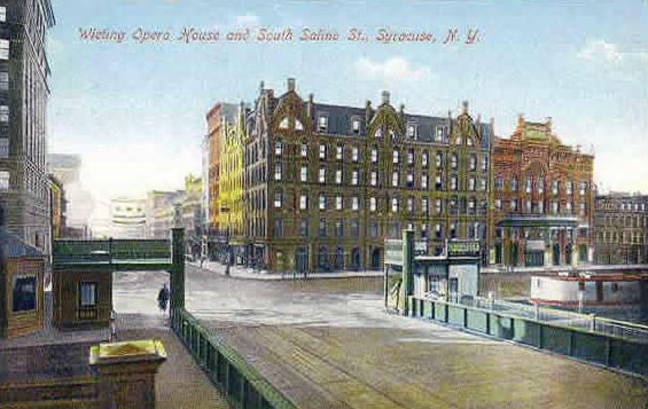
Wieting Block and Wieting Opera House in Clinton Square in Syracuse, New York 1913 from Erie Canal bridge

The block in Syracuse on which the Wieting Opera House was located, near Clinton Square, was initially a hardware store, shoe store, and "granite hall", a performance hall. The block burnt in 1849 or 1851, and was rebuilt shortly afterwards, as a large building with a hall on top by Charles A. Wheaton and Horace Wheaton. Their hall was the city's first to have a gallery.

The building was purchased by John Wieting in 1850. Wieting, who had made a fortune in lecturing, felt that Syracuse did not have a public hall that was proportionally large enough for the city. He either funded improvements or the building of a new hall in 1852. The hall was opened on December 16, 1852. Wieting had plans to develop his building further, but before he could, it burnt down on January 5, 1856. The fire almost razed the whole building; just the left wall was left standing. Firefighters who responded were unable to contain the fire at first as the water they were attempting to use froze. The damages were estimated at $200,000. No notable performances had been held in the hall at that point.

Wieting oversaw the building of the second Wieting Hall in its place. Construction was completed in around 100 days and the hall opened on December 9, 1856. The hall was one story above the street and had an entrance on Salina Street, while the stage was to the west. A gallery went from the stage around the hall. Seating was first interlocked wooden chairs, but these were later replaced with "opera chairs". This hall became known for hosting various speakers. It held lectures from figures including Charles Dickens, Thurlow Weed, Dean Richmond, John Kelly, Charles Sumner, Henry Ward Beecher, Roscoe Conkling, Horace Greeley, Ralph Waldo Emerson, Buffalo Bill, Peter Cagger, Wendell Phillips, Samuel J. Tilden, Henry Jarvis Raymond, Stephen A. Douglas, John Albion Andrew, John Brough, Edwin D. Morgan, John Sherman, Gerrit Smith, William Lloyd Garrison, Hannibal Hamlin, Samuel Joseph May, Chester A. Arthur, John Van Buren, Horatio Seymour, and Anna Elizabeth Dickinson.

The hall also held performances, with singers such as Adelina Patti, Christina Nilsson, and Euphrosyne Parepa-Rosa. Others who performed include Edwin Booth, Edwin Forrest, Joseph K. Emmett, Charlotte Cushman, Harrigan and Hart, Ellen Terry, Lillian Russell, Sarah Bernhardt, Fanny Janauschek, John McCullough, Lawrence Barrett, Joseph Jefferson, and Henry Irving. During the 1860s, Wieting Hall hosted many minstrel shows by performers including Lew Benedict, Primrose and West, and Charles, Daniel and Gus Frohman.

== Political conventions ==
The hall was regularly the site of state conventions for political parties; the historian Franklin H. Chase stated that it held more conventions than any other American hall. Wieting Hall held the New York State convention of the Democratic Party in 1858; after beginning at noon the party could not resolve existing divisions and a disagreement arose over who should chair the meeting. Tensions rose high, and one chair was forcibly removed from his role. In August 1860 it served as the site of newly formed Republican Party of New York's convention. Future governor Edwin Morgan received the nomination. It was the site of pledges to the Union during the American Civil War, and a two-lecture series on November 14 and 15, 1861, by Frederick Douglass, titled "The Rebellion, its Cause and Remedy". In anticipation of Douglass's arrival, some Syracuse residents protested his visit; a handbill was circulated advocating for citizens to "drive him from our city!" Syracuse's mayor, Charles Andrews, fearing a mob might attack Douglass, deployed the police and drafted 50 additional men. He was joined in his efforts by the county sheriff and soldiers training at a nearby camp. Wieting refused to cancel Douglass's performance, and he arrived to a hall that was protected with soldiers and greeted by Andrews himself.

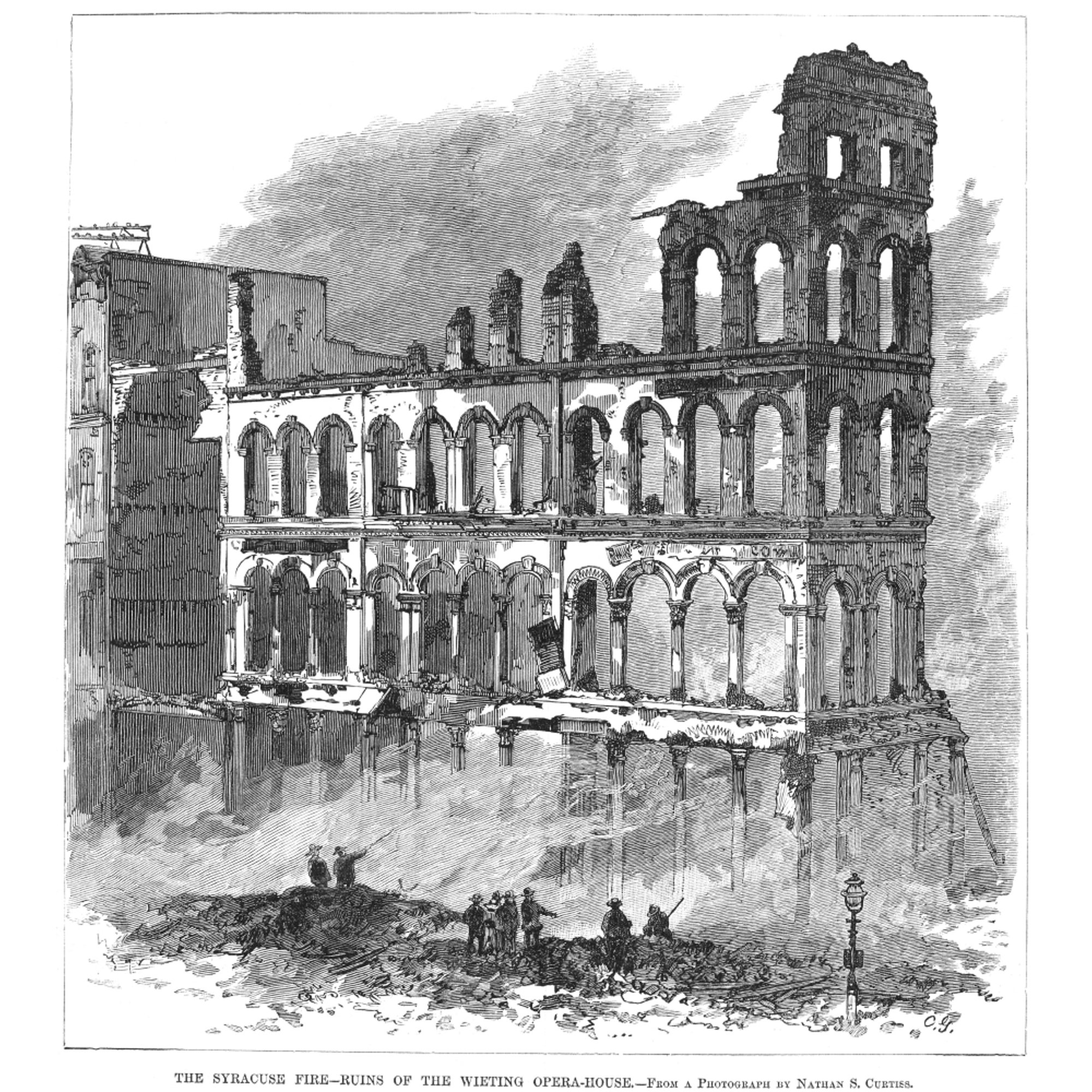
Ruins of the Opera House after the 1881 fire

The 1861 convention of the New York State Teachers Association was held at the hall, with speeches from figures including Susan B. Anthony. Dickens visited Syracuse in 1868 and read from A Christmas Carol and The Pickwick Papers for a reported two hours. In September 1871 Roscoe Conkling took leadership of the New York State Republican party at a convention at the Wieting. One of the last conventions held there was of the Liberal party in 1872.

== Wieting Opera House ==
Twenty-four years after it opened, in 1870, Wieting had the building renamed the Wieting Opera House as part of a series of renovations. The building opened under its new name on September 19, 1870. It had a seating capacity of 1,017, (Note: Reportedly able to be increased to 2,000 "by the use of stools".) and, despite its name, did not have a true opera performance until an 1886 performance by the American Opera Company. Foster Hirsch notes that opera was "not intended to be the theatre's staple" and the name merely offered a "respectable cover". In 1878 the hall hosted a convention of the National Liberal League. One of the last performances was Sarah Bernhardt, who appeared in March 1881 in Camille. The opera house caught fire on July 19, 1881, and was again burnt to the ground. Losses from the fire were estimated at $400,000, and it was again rebuilt, with the purchase of additional land. The new opera house was the first building in Syracuse to have incandescent lighting. It opened on September 18, 1883. Upon Wieting's death in 1888, his wife, Mary Elizabeth Wieting, inherited his estate and began managing the opera house.

The Syracuse University Alma Mater's first performance was under the title "Song of Syracuse" at the Wieting on March 15, 1893.

This hall burnt down on September 3, 1896, and Mary Wieting funded a rebuilding, which opened on September 16, 1897. She had been involved in the reconstruction, attempting to make the opera house "absolutely fire-proof" and offering suggestions to Oscar Cobb as he designed the new building. It was sometimes referred to as the "New Wieting Opera House". The building was heavily decorated, colored gold and rose, with chandeliers, floors made from Italian mosaic, silk and velvet drapes, and doors made from bronze.

The Shubert brothers managed the opera house for almost 25 years beginning in the early 1900s. In September 1918, Lee and J. J. Shubert, attempted to file a legal suit in order to force the name of the building to be changed to the "Shubert–Wieting Opera House", which Wieting had her agent respond to by saying that such a change would be in "violation of the theatre lease and will not be countenanced".

== Notable performances and reputation ==
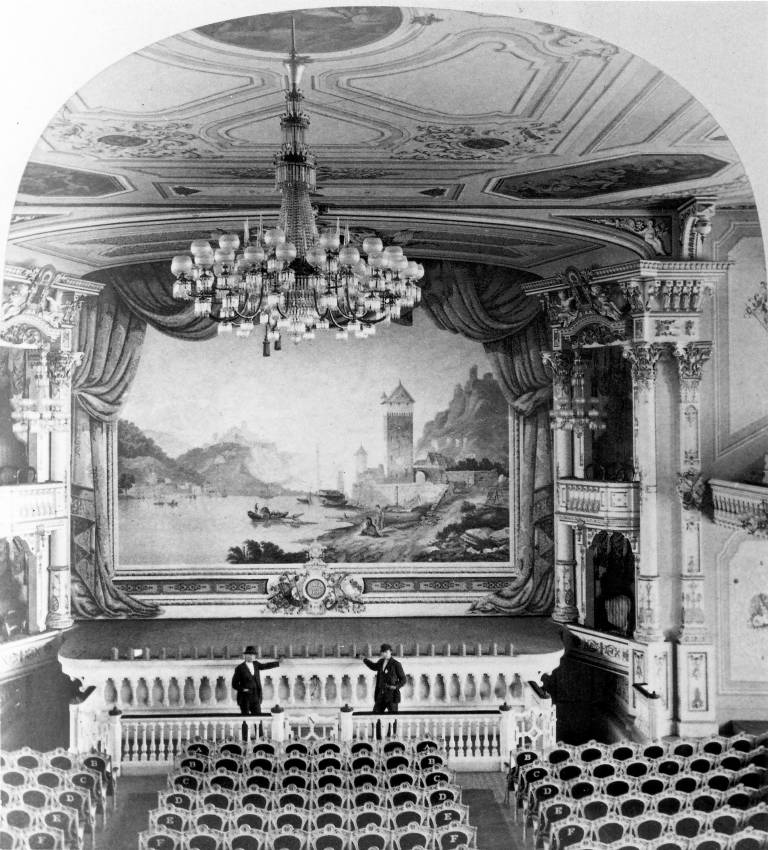
Wieting Opera House interior, 1878

At its peak, the Wieting was considered "one of the premiere theaters in the East". Its construction and the presence of several similar theaters developed the city into a place to try-out plays that would later go to be performed on Broadway. The theater was a member of The Theatrical Syndicate, which gave it "first claim" on a number of Broadway shows and revivals in the area. In 1889 Mary Wieting hired Sam S. Shubert as a treasurer, and two years later made him house manager. He in turn hired his brother, Levi. Sam progressed his career here for a time, producing his first show circa 1896 with a production of A Texas Steer. However, he left to manage the Bastable Theatre, a local competitor to the Wieting, in December 1897. Shubert led the Bastable in competition with the Wieting and the greater Theatrical Syndicate.

According to the 2008 book Our Movie Houses, "all the big stars of the Broadway stage performed at the Wieting during the later decades of the nineteenth century." A 1930 article in the Syracuse Herald claimed that "[e]very theatrical star of any consequence in America since 1850 has appeared at the Wieting." Notable actors and lecturers that performed at the Wieting Opera House during this era include Lillian Russell, Victor Herbert, Helena Modjeska, Ellen Terry, and Mark Twain. The hall hosted a popular series of Gilbert and Sullivan shows.

The first performance in the Wieting Opera House in 1870 was The Lancers. The first performance in the Wieting after it was reconstructed in 1882 was Romeo and Juliet starring Hortense Rhéa. In 1883 the Wieting held a performance The Maid of Arran, musical by Syracuse native L. Frank Baum. The stop was very successful; a local paper described a "very large and fashionable audience." Baum had the Wieting give out free copies of the musical's sheet music to attendees. The following year an October 4 performance of Prince Methusalem by the New York Opera Company began late after the company was unable to pay for transport to Syracuse due to a poor reception in Elmira, New York. The audience, described in The New York Times as a large one, had become impatient and "noisy demonstrations" broke out before the opera company emerged and the show began, belatedly. In December 1895 The School Girl starring Minnie Palmer came to the United States for a tour. It began on December 23 at the Wieting; shortly before the performance Richard Golden, a co-star, fell ill and the show's director William Gill was forced to take his place.

The Wedding Day, starring Lillian Russell, opened its touring season on September 15, 1896, in what was also the newly rebuilt Wieting's first performance. The stop kicked off a tour that was described as having "exceptional success". In January 1899 the theater showed chronomatograph videos in an event kicked off by Burton Holmes. During Theodore Roosevelt's 1900 campaign for the presidency he spoke at the Wieting and nearby Clinton Square. An estimated crowd of slightly under 15,000 people heard him speak. On September 7, 1900, the Wieiting hosted a performance of Anthony Hope Hawkins to raise funds in the aftermath of that year's Galveston hurricane that ran from 11 am to 11 pm. On November 29, 1902, smoke from a nearby fire filled the opera house, but the company finished their performance. In 1905 the theatre advertised that Ida Tarbell would be performing there for twenty weeks, but this did not happen. The operetta Naughty Marietta was first run for a week at the Wieting beginning October 24, 1910, and it premiered on Broadway the following month.

The New York Philharmonic Orchestra performed several times at the Wieting, first in 1896. A 1910 rendition of The Bohemian Girl put on by the orchestra was well received critically, but somewhat poorly attended.

== Later history ==
The New Wieting Opera House added movies to its offerings in the early 1900s. The Wieting showed a premiere of the 1921 film The Right Way, which advocated for prison reform. The estate of Mary Wieting, who had died in 1927, held the opera house until they sold it to the Hemacon Realty Corporation for $1 million in July 1929. In May 1930 the Syracuse Herald described the building as probably "the outstanding relic of the past still existent in modern Syracuse". That year, the Shuberts's lease on the theater was set to expire on August 1, and the owners were unwilling to undertake reconstruction and expansion projects. The company's head said "There will be no theater on the Wieting site after Aug. 1. That much can be said with assurance." It was reported that the theater would likely be replaced by a garage, although a local theater owner, Nathan Robbins, was working to finance a reconstruction project.

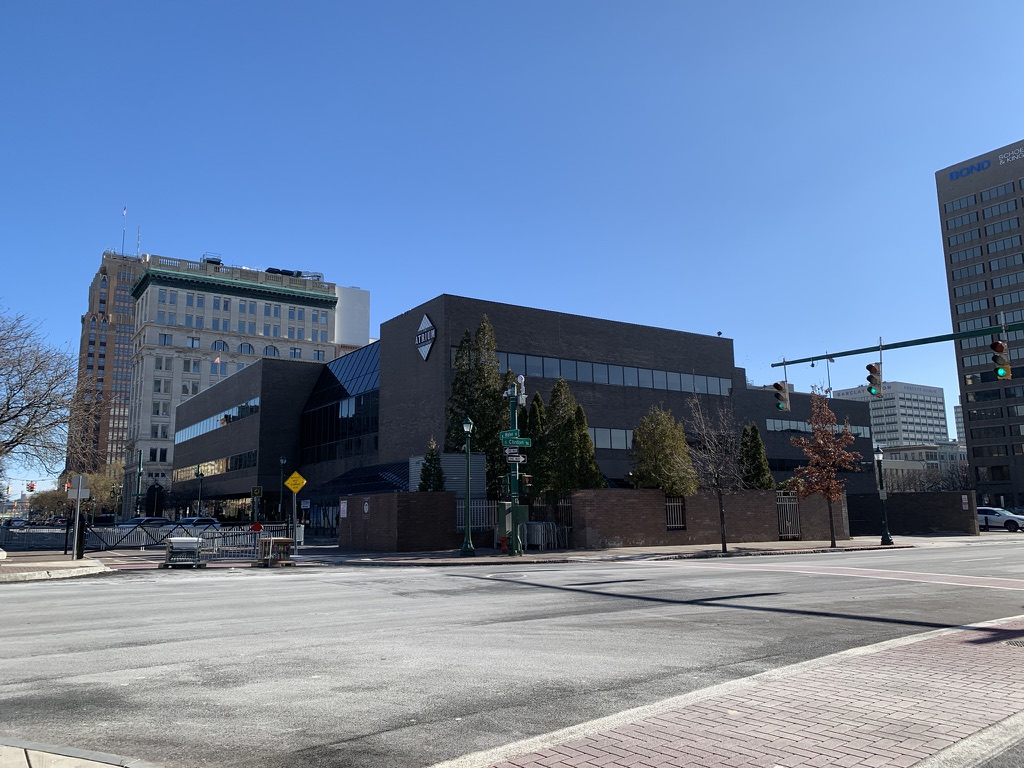
The atrium at Clinton Square, on the former site of the Wieting Opera House

It was announced on June 21 that the Opera House had been purchased to be made into a parking garage that connected to the Lincoln Bank. The cost of purchase was later disclosed to be $200,000. By the time it was sold, the theater was in very poor condition, with water damage and unstable walls. The seats were removed, and the walls were reinforced, with one being completely reconstructed. At one point the land was occupied by Syracuse's E. W. Edwards department store. The current plot is occupied by the Atrium at Clinton Square, redeveloped in 1972.
