= NYSTA =

NYSTA may refer to:

- New York Singing Teachers' Association
- New York State Teachers Association
- New York State Thruway Authority
