= Minnie Palmer =

American actress

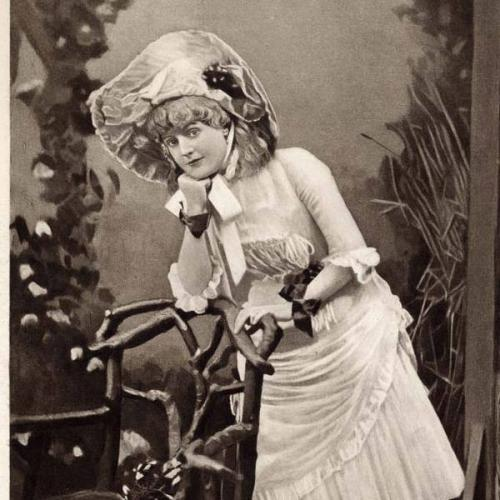
- Palmer circa 1885
- Born: March 31, 1857; Philadelphia, Pennsylvania
- Died: May 21, 1936 (aged 79); Bay Shore, Louisiana
- Occupation: Actress
- Spouse(s): John R. Rogers; Francis Jerrard

Minnie Palmer (March 31, 1857 – May 21, 1936) was an American actress in dramatic and musical plays. She became internationally famous for her starring role in William Gill's musical My Sweetheart.

== Early years ==
Minnie Palmer was born in Philadelphia, Pennsylvania on March 31, 1857. The daughter of an actress, it is likely, although not certain, that her birth name was Roswitha Schwarzenburg. She was educated at the Academy of the Sacred Heart in New York City (now Manhattanville College); an institution operated by nuns and founded by the Society of the Sacred Heart. She later supplemented her convent education by studying languages, dancing, and singing abroad.

== Career ==
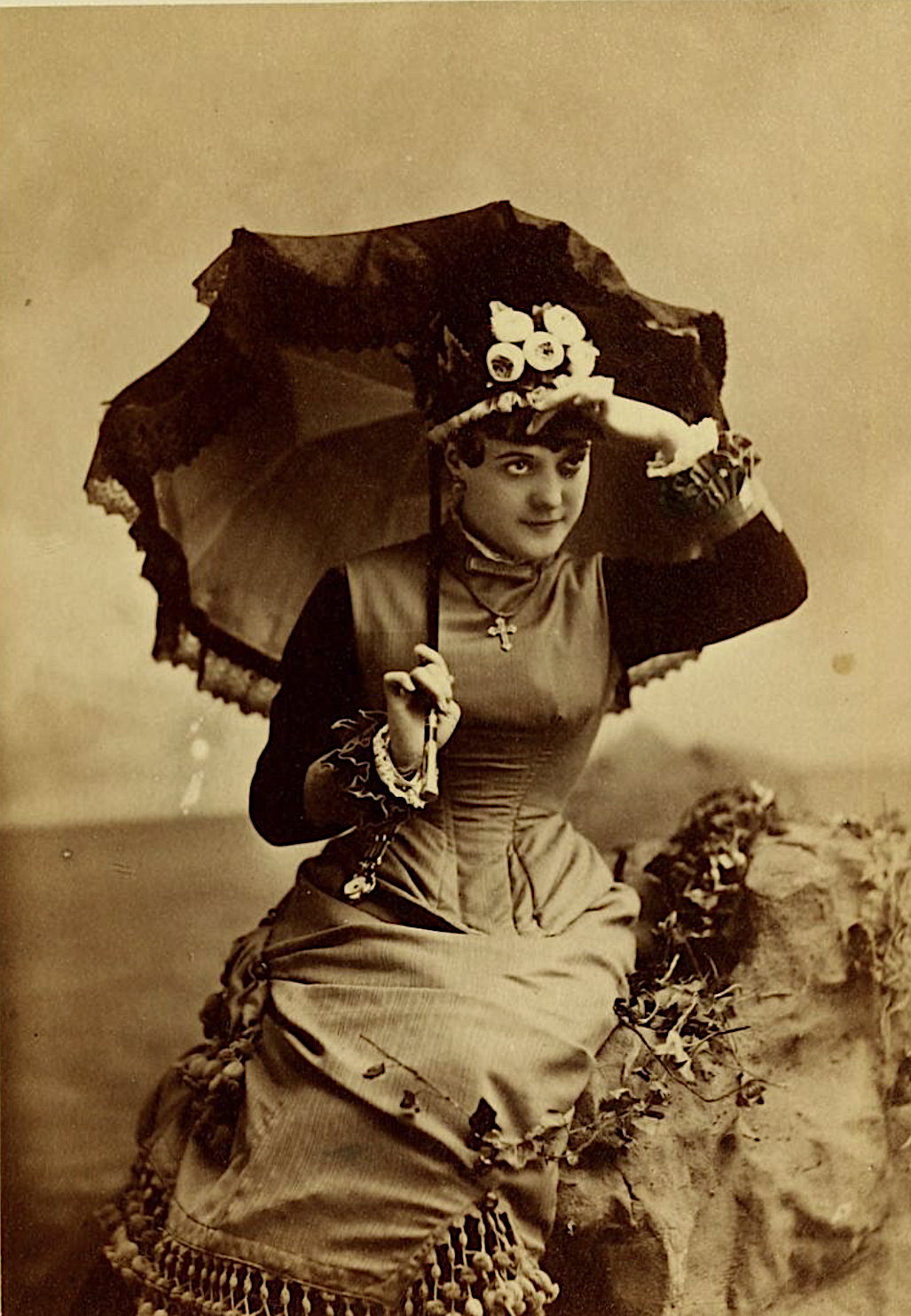
Minnie Palmer

Palmer began her career as an actress while a teenager; making her first appearances in Baltimore, Maryland in smaller parts at the Ford's Grand Opera House and the Abbey Theater. Her first larger role was in Le Pavillon Rouge at the Park Theatre, Brooklyn on June 8, 1874; a performance sometimes credited as her stage debut. She debuted on Broadway in 1876. Her Broadway credits included Lightnin' (1918), My Partner (1879), and Baby (1878). Other productions in which she acted were The Day After the Wedding, The Little Rebel, and The Cricket on the Hearth.

Palmer achieved international fame as Tina in William Gill's musical My Sweetheart; a work which she initially performed in its world premiere at Shattuck’s Opera House in Hornellsville, New York on 27 August 1881. The role became Palmer's signature part, and she toured widely in My Sweetheart well into the first decade of the 20th century. In its initial form, the musical featured songs by Robert Emmett Graham and Theo Bendix and a story and dialogue by Gill. Graham also originating the role of Tony Faust. Over time, the work was re-crafted around the dramatic and musical gifts of Palmer, and adjustments were made by other writers to Gill's play; including additions by the writers Fred Maeder and Clay Greene. Likewise, musical material underwent several iterations, with songs both old and new being swapped in and out throughout the play's run to best suit both audience taste and Palmer's gifts.

Palmer's performances in My Sweetheart had a lasting effect, as described in an article in the February 1915 issue of Motion Picture Magazine: "The American woman in an English theater is always of the soubret type, due ... to the phenomenal success of Minnie Palmer when she originally produced My Sweetheart in London." A side effect of that success was that Palmer became so identified with girlish roles that she rarely could find success in other roles. Performances of My Sweetheart in England enhanced her status with the public and with critics. The 1885-1887 touring production also took Palmer and the company to Germany, Switzerland, Australia, New Zealand, and eight other countries.

Palmer continued to return to My Sweetheart with some frequency after the work's initial international tour. The work achieved its greatest popularity in Europe and Australia, but was not as successful in the United States and never reached Broadway. As late as February 1907 Palmer was starring in My Sweetheart at the Perth Theatre; more than 25 years after she originated the role.

Palmer retired from the stage in 1908.

== Personal life ==
Palmer married John R. Rogers, her manager, but they later divorced. Her next husband was Francis Jerrard, "a rich Englishman". She left acting and accompanied Jerrard to England, where they lived in "a sumptuous mansion".

== Confusion of identies ==
In the 1910s, some confusion arose when Minnie Marx, of the Marx Brothers family, assumed the name Minnie Palmer. The newer entertainer's use of the name caused confusion to researchers, "who continue to include both in the same files."

== Death ==
On May 21, 1936, Palmer died in Bay Shore, Louisiana. She was 79 years old.
