= Boston Theatre =

1854–1925 theatre in Massachusetts, United States

Coordinates: 42°21′15.79″N 71°3′45.35″W

See Federal Street Theatre for an earlier theatre known also as the Boston Theatre

The Boston Theatre was a theatre in Boston, Massachusetts. It was first built in 1854 and operated as a theatre until 1925. Productions included performances by Jean de Reszke, Italo Campanini, Thurlow Bergen, Charles A. Bigelow, Edwin Booth, Anna Held, James O'Neill Jennie Kimball, Christine Nilsson and others.

== Images ==
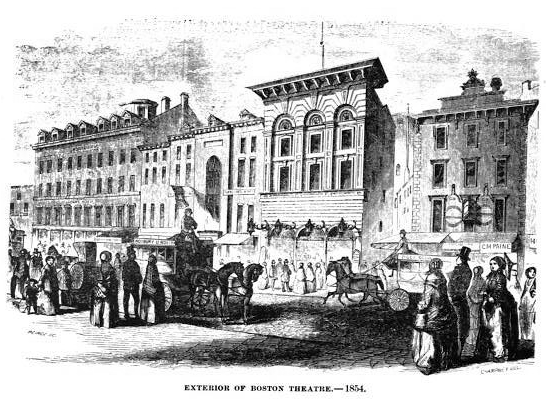
Boston Theatre street view, ca.1854

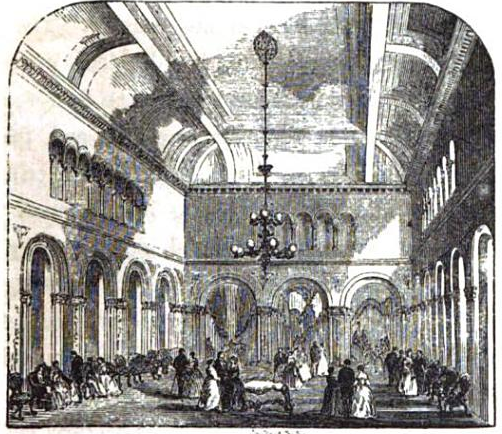
Interior, ca.1850s

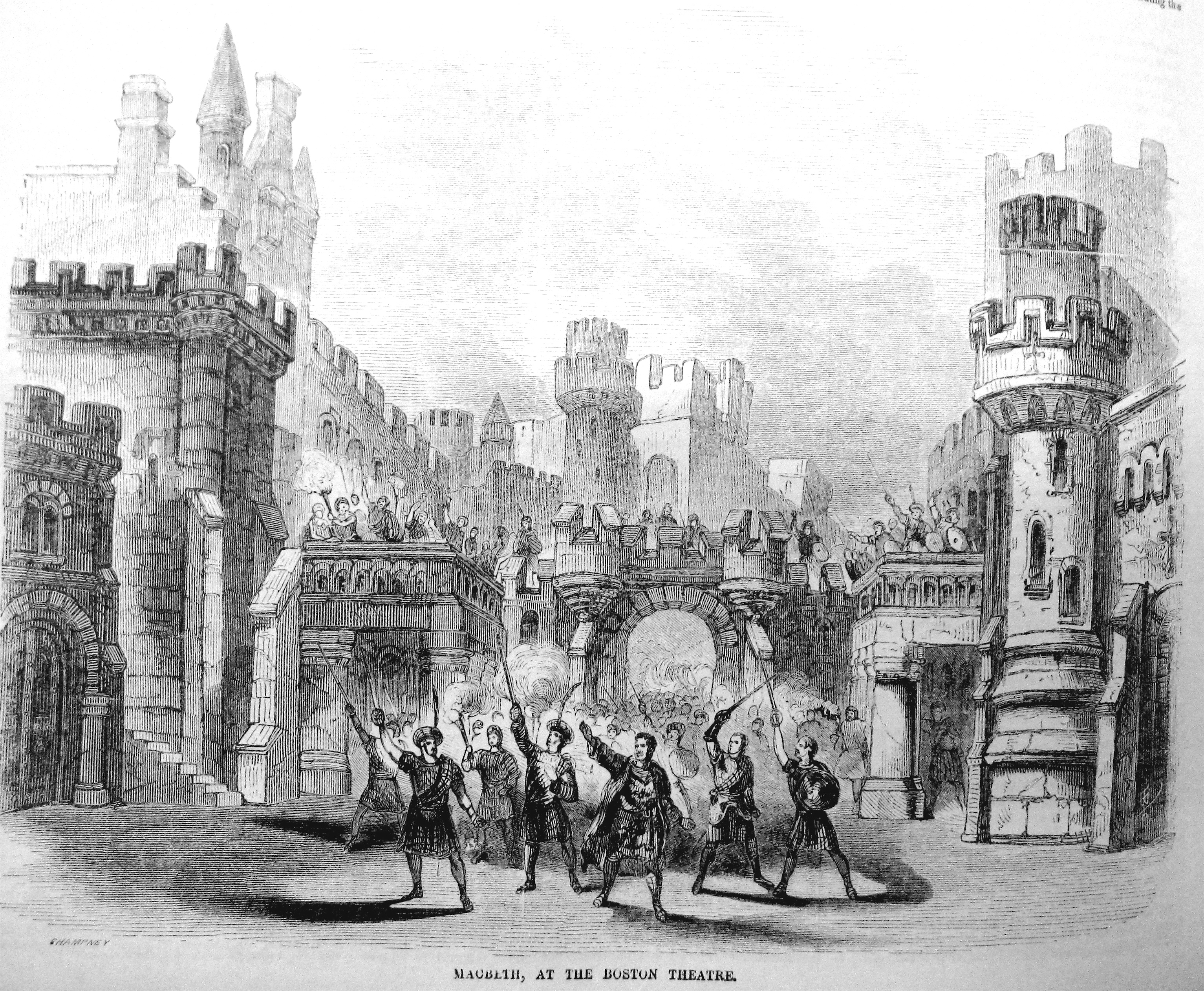
Macbeth at the Boston Theatre, 1850s

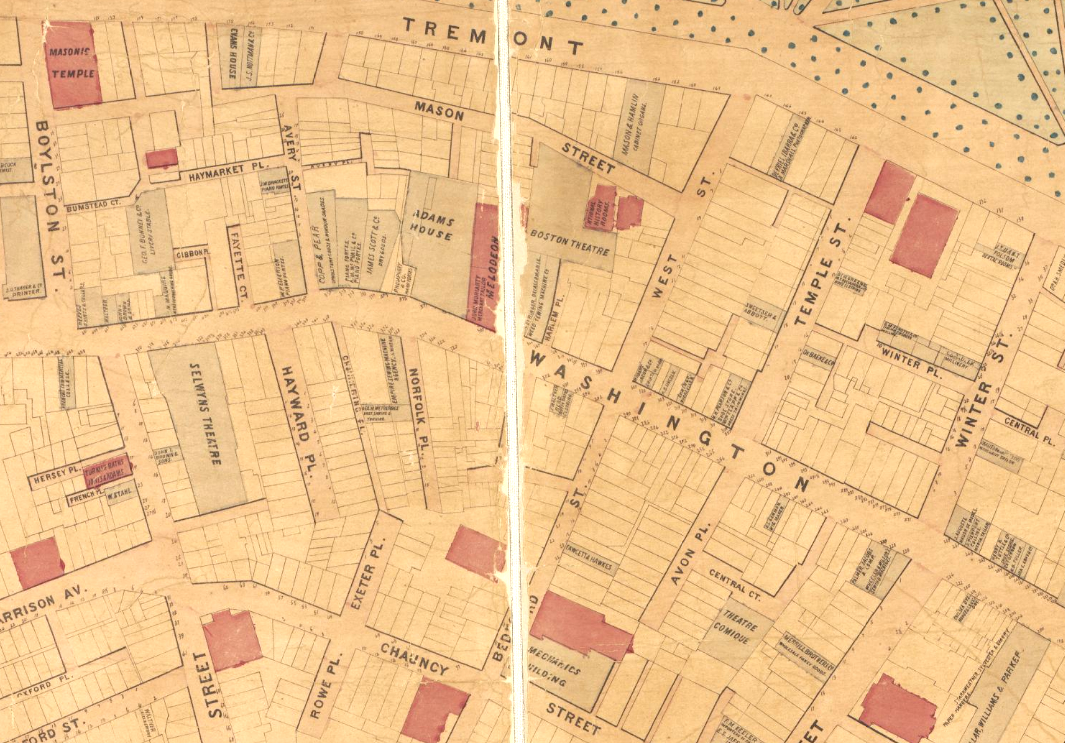
Detail of 1869 map of Boston, showing Boston Theatre on Washington Street

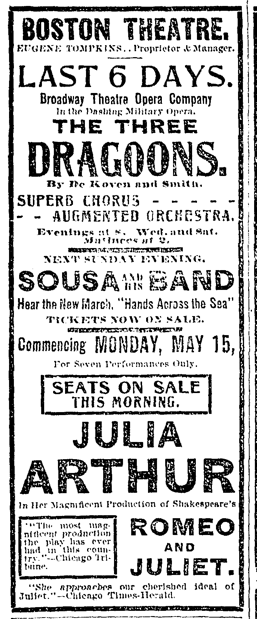
Advertisement, 1899
