= John Wieting =

American lecturer and philanthropist (1817–1888)

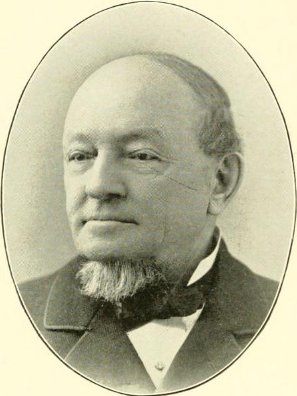
John M. Wieting (1903)

John Manchester Wieting (February 8, 1817 – February 13, 1888) was an American lecturer and philanthropist. He spent his early years as a teacher and then as an engineer and grader. After moving to Syracuse, New York, he read medicine to become a physician. After purchasing anatomical models he began giving lectures across upstate New York, gradually expanding the reach and the size of his lectures. They were extravagant affairs, and Wieting became known as one of the era's most prominent anatomical lecturers.

He retired from lecturing at the age of 45 in 1862, and spent his remaining years traveling the world and engaging in philanthropic efforts, mainly aimed at the development of Syracuse. Wieting funded construction of the Wieting Opera House in the city, which was open until 1930 and became a place for Broadway plays to be tried out.

== Biography ==
John Manchester Wieting was born in Springfield, New York, on February 8, 1817, to Peter Wieting and Mary Elizabeth Wieting née Manchester. His grandfather, John Christopher Wieting, had immigrated to the United States from Prussia or Germany and fought with the colonists in the American Revolutionary War. After the war, John Christopher became an American citizen and moved to Minden, New York, where he was pastor of the Lutheran Church.

Wieting started teaching at the public schools of Deerfield, New York, when he was fourteen years old, after his father's business failed. He reportedly spent his summers as a student at the Clinton Liberal Institute. He worked on a survey of the Erie Railroad in 1835 and two years later moved to Syracuse, New York, where he found employment as a civil engineer, working on construction of the Syracuse and Utica Railroad. Wieting surveyed Rosehill Cemetery and graded streets around the city. When not working, he studied medicine with Hiram Hoyt, a local physician, and was a physician's apprentice for a time.

Wieting eventually switched careers and become a physician. He also embarked upon a career as a lecturer, after purchasing the "lecturing apparatus" used by Austin Flint, chiefly a manikin and anatomical charts. He began lecturing across upstate New York in 1843, gradually expanding his performance in the years that followed. Ten years later, he owned six life-sized manikins which he could take apart and use to show over 1,700 body parts. He also owned models of organs and human skeletons. Wieting gave his lectures primarily about anatomy and physiology. While his wife maintained that these lectures were "modest and quiet", others such as Frederick Hollick criticized his talks as including "generally erroneous" and misleading explanations, specifically about contraception. Hollick also argued that Wieting had stolen portions of his work. In 1994 the scholar Janet Farrell Brodie wrote that Wieting's lectures were aimed at "shock[ing] and titillat[ing] audiences" and providing information on contraception information. His scientific lectures were very popular. They were also known for being dramatic affairs, with the stage carefully arranged and "dramatic lighting." In 1850 a Boston newspaper wrote of Wieting's lecture series at Tremont Temple: "such an immense rush was never caused in Boston before by any lecturer on scientific objects." Wieting gave over one hundred lectures in Boston alone. He retired from lecturing when he was forty-five years old in 1862.

Wieting also gained a reputation as a philanthropist working to develop Syracuse. He funded the construction of the Wieting Block and Wieting Opera House near Clinton Square, and its rebuilding twice after being destroyed by fire. In the late 1860s, Wieting became involved with the Cardiff Giant, a local archaeological hoax then believed to be authentic, attempting to purchase it for $25,000. A consortium of local businessmen including Amos Westcott, Amos Gillett, and David Hannum, emerged to challenge Wieting's bid. They soon joined forces with another group consisting of Simeon Rouse and Alfred Higgins. The owner of the Cardiff Giant eventually accepted their offer of $30,000 for 3/4 ownership over Wieting's. Wieting reportedly became involved in arguing that the giant was a fraud after his offer was rejected.

== Personal life and death ==
Wieting was married to Mary Elizabeth Plumb. The two traveled the world in 1875. They visited Europe in 1887, at which point Wieting was in poor health. He died on February 13, 1888, of pneumonia and was buried in Oakwood Cemetery. Wieting's mausoleum in Oakwood Cemetery was built while he was still alive, in 1880. It has been compared to a Buddhist stupa, which Wieting may have seen on his tour of the world.

== Legacy ==
Scholar Michael Sappol named Wieting, along with Frederick Hollick, one of the two most significant anatomical lecturers of the era. An obituary estimated that he had earned the most money of any contemporary American through lecturing. His collection used in lectures was donated to Syracuse University by his widow. Mary Wieting also wrote Prominent Incidents in the Life of Dr. John M. Wieting, Including His Travels with his Wife around the World, an account of Wieting's life including their tour around the world. However, despite its title, the novel is largely an autobiographical work about her life.

=== Wieting Opera House ===
Wieting had decided to fund work on Wieting Hall because he felt that Syracuse did not have a public hall that was proportionally large enough for the city. He rebuilt the hall twice after fires and developed it into a performance space and convention hall attended by many. In 1870 Wieting renovated and renamed the hall the Wieting Opera House. Upon Wieting's death in 1888, his wife, Mary Elizabeth Wieting, inherited his estate and began managing the opera house. This hall burnt down on September 3, 1896, and Mary Wieting funded a rebuilding. The construction of several theatres in Syracuse, namely the Wieting— considered "one of the premiere theaters in the East", developed the city into a place to try-out plays that would later go to be performed on Broadway. The final iteration of the Wieting Opera House was open until 1930.
