= Mary Elizabeth Wieting Johnson =

American opera house manager and philanthropist

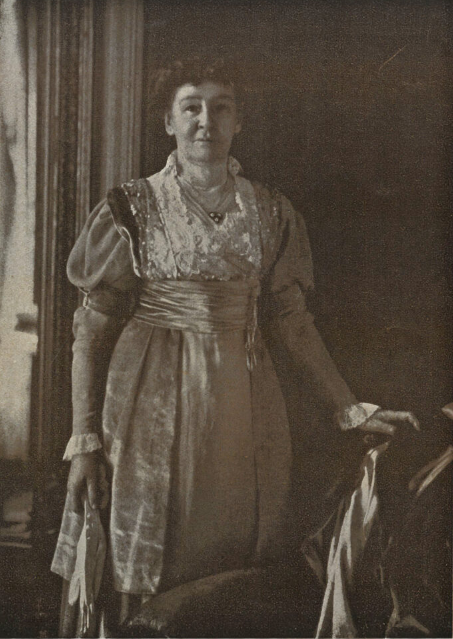
- Wieting Johnson in 1916
- Born: Mary Elizabeth Plumb; 1843; Chenango County, New York, U.S.
- Died: 1927 (aged 83–84)
- Occupation: Opera house manager
- Spouses: John Wieting (died 1888) Melville Augustus Johnson (m. 1900; died 1909)

Mary Elizabeth Wieting Johnson (1843 – 1927) was an American opera house manager and philanthropist who ran the Wieting Opera House in Syracuse, New York, after the death of her husband, John Wieting. She oversaw management of the Wieting Opera House and its reconstruction after it burned down for the third time in 1896.

== Biography ==
Mary Elizabeth Plumb was born in 1843, to Samuel Plumb and his wife in Chenango County, New York. Her family moved to Homer, New York, and she was educated at Cortland Academy. She married John Wieting, a retired lecturer and philanthropist. He had funded the construction of the Wieting Opera House on Clinton Square and rebuilt it twice after fires in 1856 and 1881. The couple traveled the world in 1868. William Martin Beauchamp wrote in 1908 that they had a "most congenial companionship" and any accounting of John's life would be incomplete without discussion of his wife.

=== Manager of Wieting Opera House ===
When Wieting died in 1888, Mary inherited his estate and began managing the opera house. During the course of the retirement of the acting manager of the opera house, H. W. Stimson, in 1891, he acted as her agent for the hiring of a new management firm under Martin W. Wagner and Moses Reis before her planned European trip in May of that year. Her subsequent actions also included hiring Sam S. Shubert, who went on to become a prominent theater owner. Mary Wieting also wrote Prominent Incidents in the Life of Dr. John M. Wieting, Including His Travels with his Wife around the World, an account of Wieting's life including their tour around the world. However, despite its title, the novel is largely an autobiographical work about her life.

=== Reconstruction of the Wieting Opera House ===
After the Wieting Opera House burnt down on September 3, 1896, the Syracuse Journal reported that she was "almost prostrated" upon hearing the news and they speculated that the Wieting Opera House would "rise again". Wieting sent a monetary gift to firemen who had been on the scene and hired others to clear the site. On November 7, the New York Dramatic Mirror speculated that if she decided to rebuild the theatre it would "no doubt eclipse anything in that line seen in this country" because she had studied art and seen many famous theatres while traveling the world. The architect Oscar Cobb came to Syracuse and she announced that she proposed to rebuild "one of the handsomest opera houses in the country", with a capacity of at least 2,000.

Wieting was involved in the reconstruction, attempting to make the opera house "absolutely fire-proof" and offering suggestions to Cobb as he designed the new building. The Dramatic Mirror reported that "every detail" was monitored by Wieting herself and felt it would stand as a testament to her name. By July, reconstruction work was progressing well, and The Post-Standard praised Wieting as demonstrating "very rare business ability and executive capacity", again noting that she carefully attended to even minor details. When the theatre was opened to great fanfare, Wieting received several rounds of an ovation. She gave a speech about the effort to rebuild the theatre.

The Shubert brothers managed the opera house under her ownership for almost 25 years beginning in the early 1900s. In September 1918, the Shuberts attempted to file a legal suit in order to force the name of the building to be changed to the "Shubert-Wieting Opera House", which Wieting had her agent respond to by saying that such a change would be in "violation of the theatre lease and will not be countenanced".

== Personal life ==
Wieting was also a member and President of The National Historical Society. Frank Allaben wrote an article about Wieting's accomplishment in restoring the opera house, with The Chandler Tribune noting that the "remarkable efficiency and artistic zeal" of the restoration was presented by Allaben as a "symbol of the creation of the world-stage".

She married John Wieting, a retired lecturer and philanthropist and they toured the world together. After his death, on November 28, 1900, she married Melville Augustus Johnson and left New York state for a time, returning to Syracuse when he died on May 29, 1909. Mary Elizabeth Wieting Johnson died in 1927. Her estate held the opera house until they sold it to the Hemacon Realty Corporation for $1 million in July 1929.
