= William Bain (Royal Navy officer) =

William Bain (1771 – 11 September 1853) was a Scottish steamship inventor, steamship captain, writer, and British naval officer. In 1817 he published Treatise on the Variation of the Compass. After serving as a Master in the Royal Navy, he was employed as the first steam captain between London and Edinburgh; piloting a vessel of his own original design, the Tourist. He was knighted by Queen Victoria on 20 March 1844.

== Life and career ==
Born in Culross, Perthshire, Bain joined the Royal Navy in 1793. His first post was on the HMS Centurion; serving on that vessel under the command of John MacBride during the Siege of Dunkirk. In 1795 he was wounded while participating in the capture of Trincomalee. In 1800 he was involved in a five month long naval blockade of Batavia, Dutch East Indies. In 1811 he was awarded the rank of Master.

He died in Romford, Essex on 11 September 1853. His grandson was the dramatist William Gill.
