= Newark Opera House =

- U.S. National Register of Historic Places
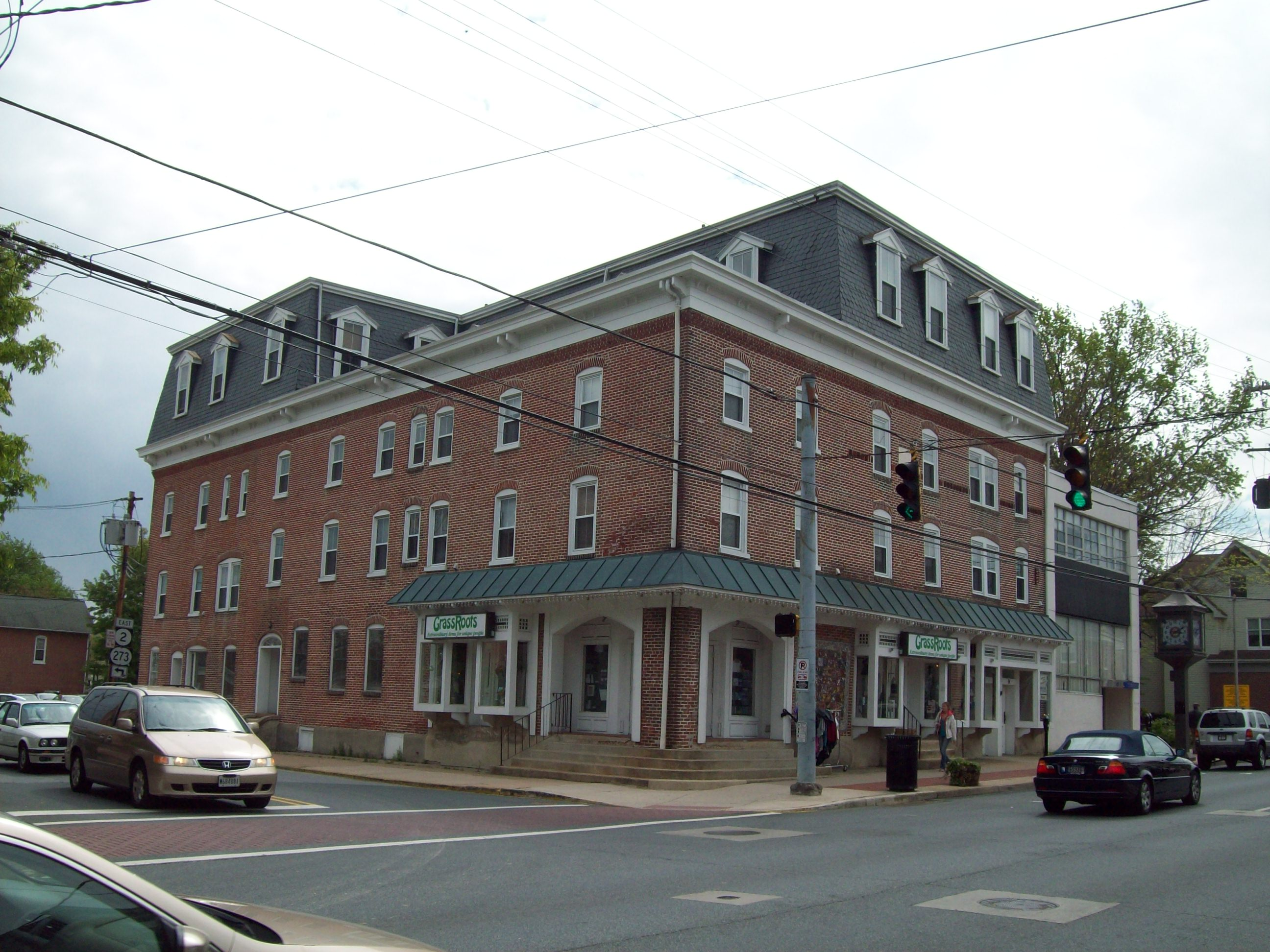
- Newark Opera House, April 2010

- Location within Delaware Location within the United States
- Location: 95 E. Main St., Newark, Delaware
- Coordinates: 39°40′59″N 75°44′59″W
- Area: 0.2 acres (0.081 ha)
- Built: 1885
- Architectural style: Second Empire
- MPS: Newark MRA
- NRHP reference No.: 82002345
- Added to NRHP: May 7, 1982

Newark Opera House is a historic commercial building and opera house located at Newark in New Castle County, Delaware. It was built in 1885 and is a four-story rectangular building with six bays at the north front facade. The fourth story was added in 1907. It features a mansard roof covered with patterned slate shingles in the Second Empire style. Between about 1885 and 1925 it was the site of live theater and music, in addition to movies.

It was added to the National Register of Historic Places in 1982.

== See also ==
- National Register of Historic Places listings in Newark, Delaware
