= Jennie Kimball =

American actor, soubrette, theatrical manager (1851–1896)

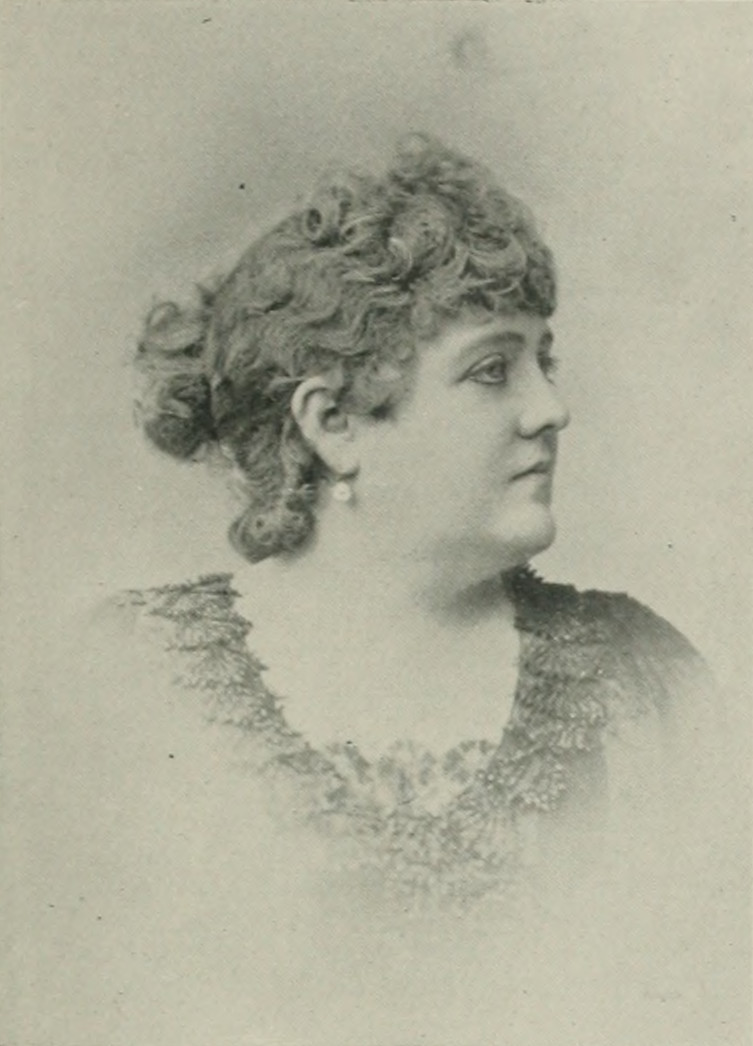
Jennie Kimball, A woman of the century

Jennie Kimball (also, Jennie Kimball Flaherty and Jennie Kimball Schaefer; June 20, 1848 – March 23, 1896) was an American actress, soubrette, and theatrical manager.

She appeared first at The Boston Theatre in 1865. After the success made by her daughter Corinne in H.M.S. Pinafore, Kimball retired from the stage herself and became Corinne's manager. Kimball was interested in several theatres. She was a woman of remarkable business ability. She personally superintended all of the work connected with the theatre and the companies in which she was interested; wrote her own advertising matter and superintended the work of the scenic artists, occupying a unique position among women of the time.

== Early years ==
Jennie Kimball was born in Portland, Maine, June 20, 1848. (Note: Willard & Livermore stated that Kimball was born in New Orleans, Louisiana, June 23, 1851, while Graham asserted that Kimball was born in New Orleans, June 23, 1848.) Her histrionic talents showed themselves in her early youth.

== Career ==
Her first appearance in public was as Obeda in Bluebeard in The Boston Theatre, in 1865, under Henry C. Jarrett's management. He was so impressed with her talent that he engaged her at the conclusion of the season for the William Warren Company, which he was then forming. After playing the principal soubrette business with that party until it disbanded, she joined the Wallack-Davenport Company in Washington, D.C., where she played a short season. Returning to Boston, she was once more engaged by Jarrett for the Boston Theater. At the close of the season, she retired from the stage temporarily, and devoted a year to the study of music and the drama.

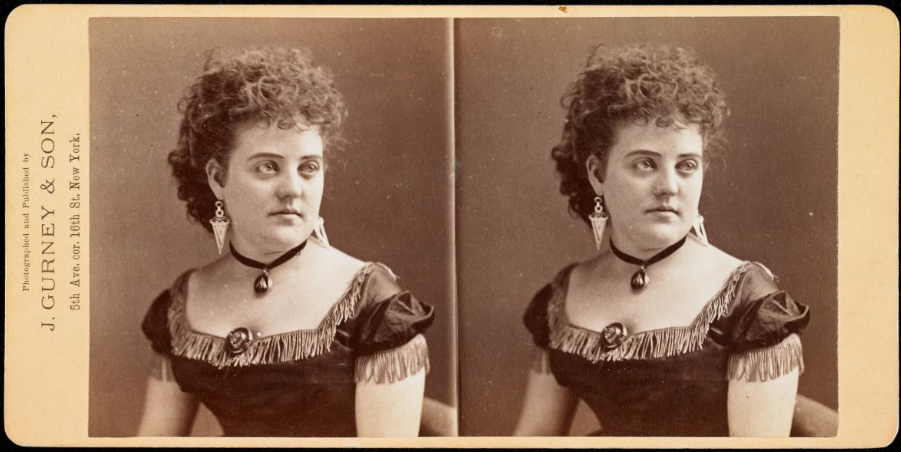
Jennie Kimball (1669-74)

Upon the completion of her studies, she was engaged by Manager Whitman for leading soubrette business in the Continental Theater, Boston, in 1868, appearing as Cinderella in H. J. Byron's burlesque, and Stalacta in The Black Crook, which ran the entire season. She afterwards played a star engagement with him in the West, appearing as Oberon in A Midsummer Night's Dream, and singing the title role in The Grand Duchess in Buffalo, Louisville, Chicago, St. Louis and other cities, winning unqualified approbation. After concluding her engagement with Whitman, she returned to the East and traveled through New England as prima donna of the Florence Burlesque Opera Company, until she was engaged by John Brougham for his New York Company, in 1869, and opened in March in Brougham's Fifth Avenue Theater, now the Madison Square, in the operetta of Jenny Lind, afterward playing Kate O'Brien in Perfection, and other musical comedies. In 1872, she was especially engaged in the Union Square Theater (under the management of Sheridan Shook) as stock star, playing all the leading parts in the burlesques, Ernani, The Field of the Cloth of Cold, Bad Dickey, Black-Eyed Susan, Aladdin, The Invisible Prince, and others, and remaining there two seasons.

After the actress Little Corinne made her success as Little Buttercup in H.M.S. Pinafore, in the Boston Theater, Kimball retired from the profession, in order to devote her whole time and attention to Corinne's professional advancement. She occasionally reappeared with her, singing the Countess in Ouvette and the Queen in Arcadia.

In 18??, Kimball commenced her career as a manager, organizing an opera company of juveniles, of which Corinne was the star. They continued uninterruptedly successful until the interference of the New York Society for the Prevention of Cruelty to Children. After the celebrated trial, which gave Kimball and her adopted daughter, Corinne, such notoriety, they opened in the Bijou Opera House, December 31, 1881, and played four weeks, thence continuing throughout the United States and Canada, winning marked success. Kimball also had an interest in several theaters.

== Personal life ==
On September 5, 1879, in New York City, she married Thomas Flaherty, a piano dealer of Boston.

Corinne, who became a comic opera prima donna, was born Christmas Day, 1875, in Boston, and made her first public appearance four years later at the Boston National Baby Show. She was adopted a year later by Kimball, who exploited “The Little Corinne” as a child actress from the time she was six years old, making continuous tours all over the country, but maintaining a home in Philadelphia and perpetually fighting Prevention of Cruelty to Children societies. Corinne’s first part was Little Buttercup, in “Pinafore,” but when she was still a child, she starred in the prima donna roles in Olivette, The Mascotte, and dozens of light operas. She made her most conspicuous success when she was fifteen in Monte Cristo Jr., which was produced in New York in 1888. The mystery concerning the parentage of Corinne (she was never known by any other name) was carefully fostered by Kimball for advertising purposes, and at various times it was given out that she was the offspring of derelict nobility and had been snatched from dreadful surroundings by Kimball; that she was an octoroon, and that she was the daughter of H. R. Jacobs and an Italian wife, although the manager never had an Italian wife.

Thomas died in 1892. On October 1, 1893, at Milwaukee, Wisconsin, she married Arling Schaefer, a banjo player in her company. Kimball died in her private car at Saint Paul Union Depot, Saint Paul, Minnesota, March 23, 1896, of pneumonia. Services were held at the Forest Hills Cemetery, Boston. It was then said that she left Corinne a large fortune, the proceeds of profits from the Kimball Opera Company, which for years she had managed with Corinne as the star.
