= Hattie Starr =

American songwriter

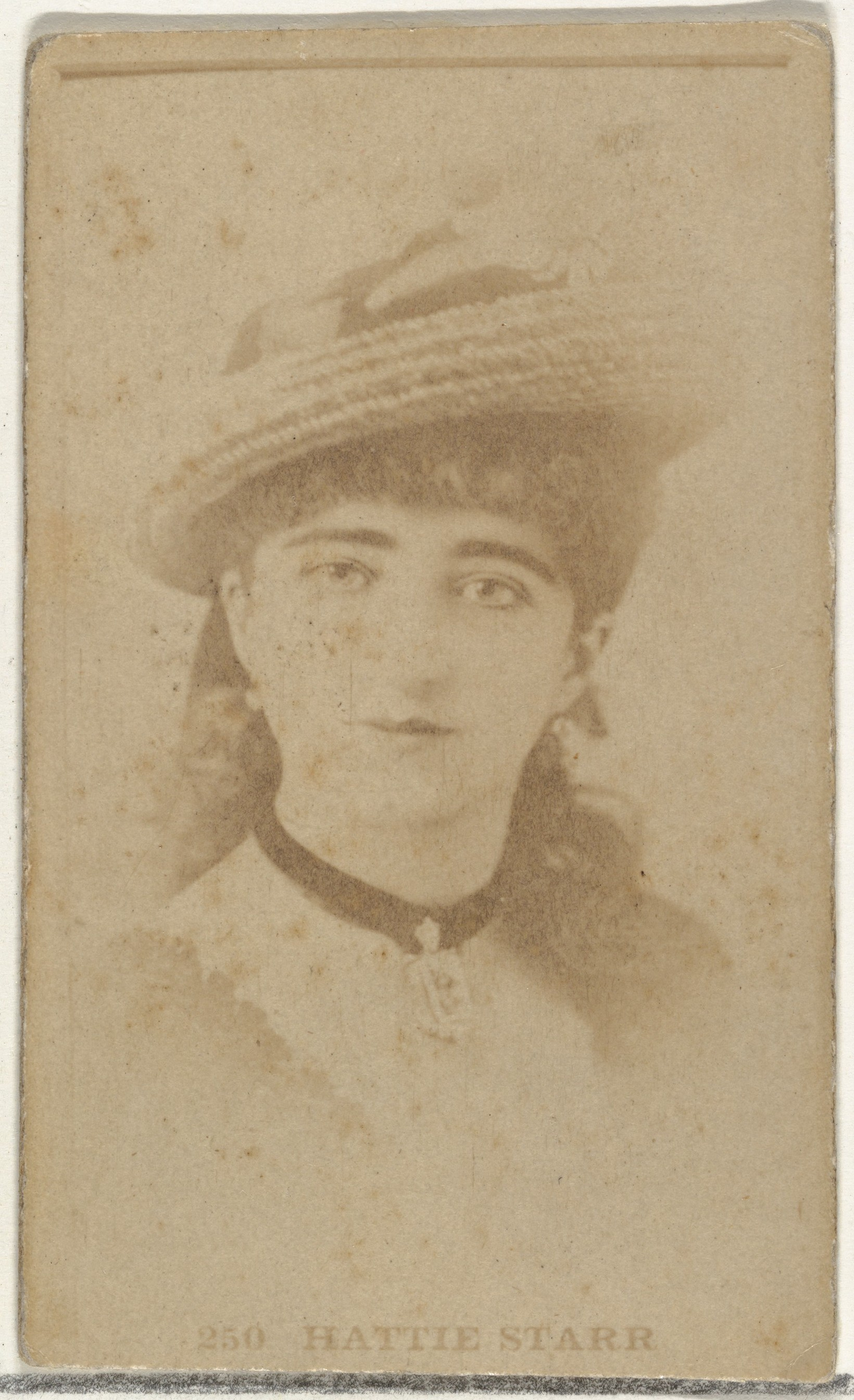
Hattie Starr, from the Actors and Actresses series (N145-7) issued by Duke Sons & Co., 1880s, Metropolitan Museum of Art

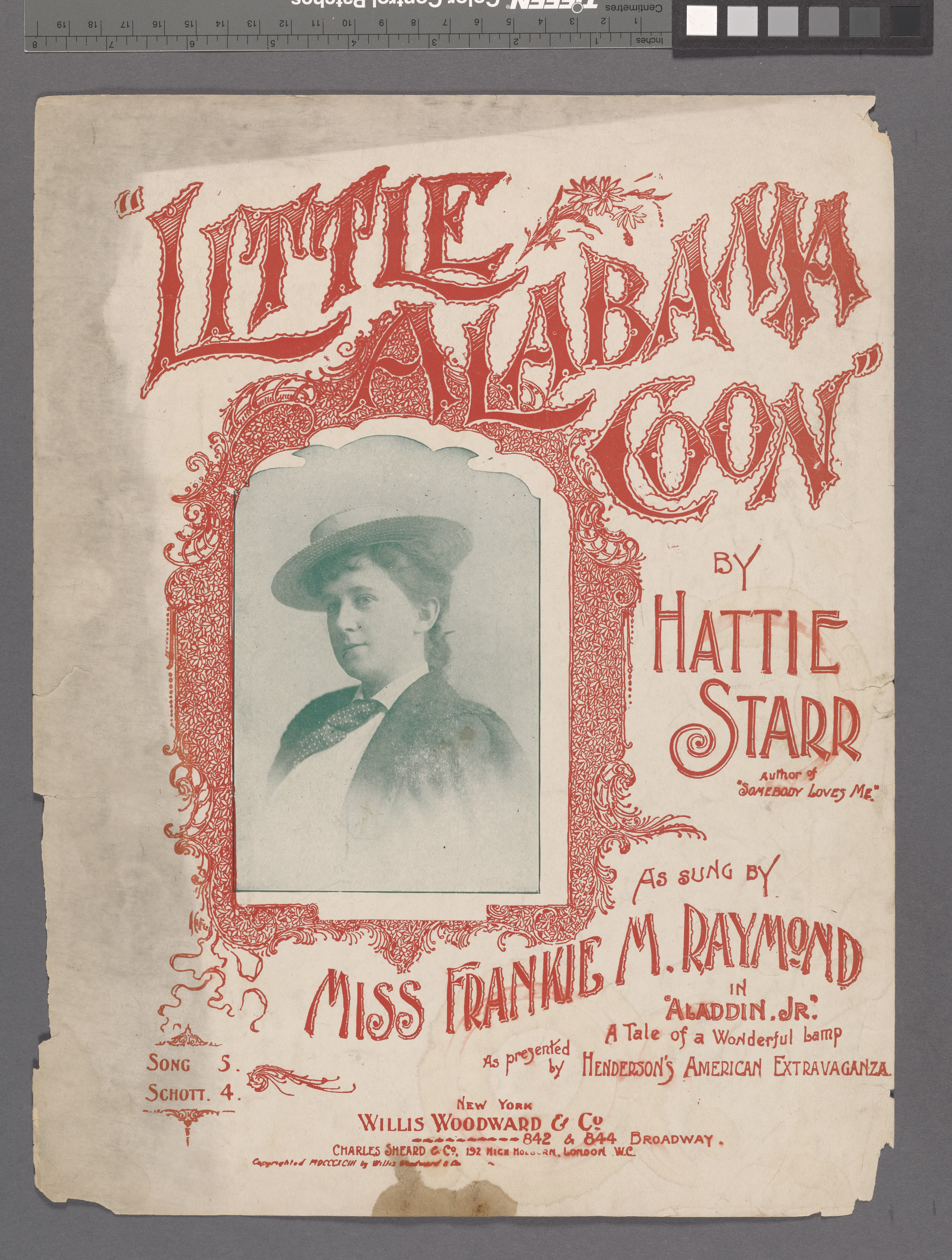
"Little Alabama Coon"

Hattie Starr was an American songwriter popular in the late 19th and early 20th century.

Her best known song and a popular hit of its day was "Little Alabama Coon" (1893). It was a coon song, but not considered racist or negative at the time compared to more coarse vaudeville fare, even being recorded by Mabel Garrison of the New York Metropolitan Opera.

Originally an actress, her songwriting proved successful enough that she left the stage. Her other compositions included Somebody Loves Me which was successfully performed by Josephine Sabel.

Lyrics of her song "Little Alabama Coon" begin:

"I's a little Alabama Coon! And I has'nt been born very long I member seein' a great big round moon! I member heaarin' one sweet song! When dey tote me down to de cotton field, Dar I roll and I tumble in de sun! While my daddy pick de cotton, mammy watch me grow, And dis am de song she sung!

Go to sleep, my little picaninny, Brer Fox 'll catch you if yo' don't; Slumber on de bosom of yo' ole Mammy Jinny, Mammy's gwine to swat yo' if you won't; (baby cry) sh! sh! sh! Lula, lula lula lula lu! Under neaf de silver Southern moon; Rockaby! hushaby! Mammy's little baby, Mammy's little Alabama Coon!"

== Works ==
- "Little Alabama Coon"
- "Somebody Loves Me"
- "You're So Good, Daddy" (1896)
- "My Chilly Baby" (1906)
- "The Pawn-Shop Man (My Onliest Dolly)", lyrics by George A. Poole
- "Laugh Yo' Little Niggers"
