= Corinne Kimball =

American singer and actress

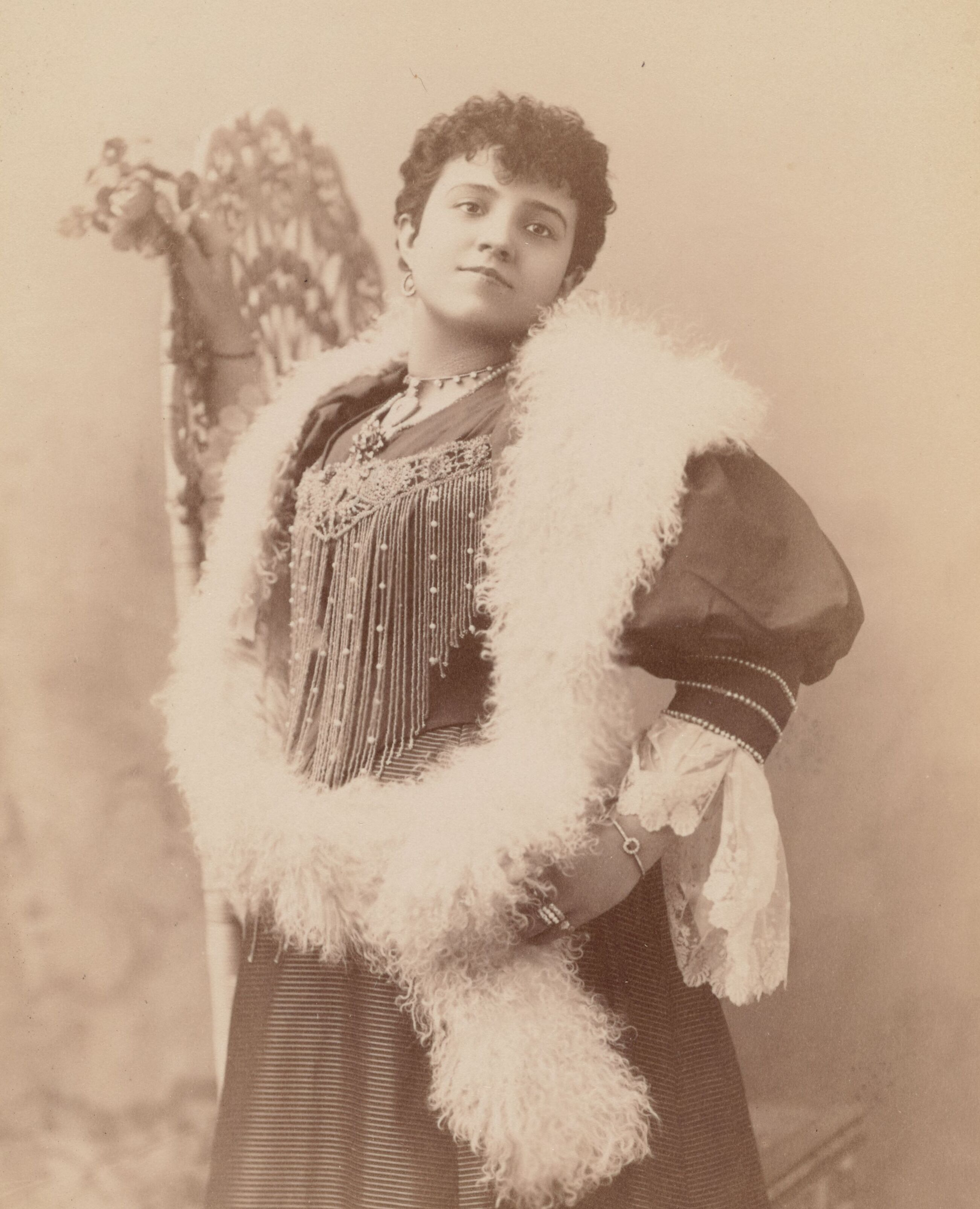
- Born: Corinne Belle De Briou; 24 December 1873; New Orleans
- Died: 1937 (aged 63–64)
- Other names: Corinne

Corinne Kimball (24 December 1873 – 1937) was an American actress. She was widely known by her stage-name Corinne.

== Biography ==
Corinne Belle De Briou Kimball was born on 24 December 1873 in New Orleans. Her foster mother was Jennie Kimball, an actor and theatrical manager. Her father, Henri De Briou was an Italian naval officer and her mother was Spanish. Kimball's mother died in 1874, her father died when she was small. Kimball was placed with Jennie Kimball. Initially her mother did not intend to have her daughter on the stage. In 1876 there was a baby show in Horticultural Hall and Kimball competed. She sang and danced which impressed everyone even at the age of three. Kimball was given the prize and a diploma. As a result her mother agreed to have her appear in the Sunday evening concert with Brown's Brigade Band as the Infant wonder.

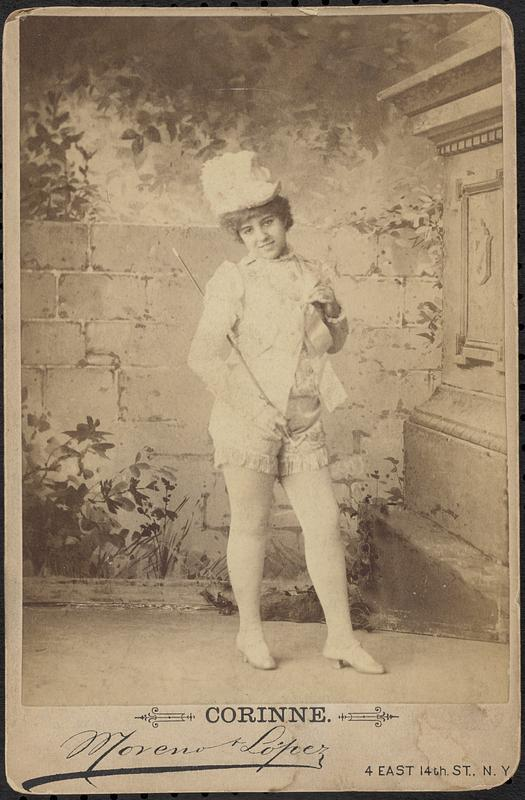
Corinne, ca. 1882-1892; from the Cabinet Card Collection of the Boston Public Library

Kimball next performed in a children's production of Pinafore as Little Buttercup at the Boston Museum. The production was a huge success and she went on tour through New England and Canada. She was next in Cinderella. After a variety of Operetta performances, Kimball began to perform in burlesque from the time she was twelve to the time she was sixteen. She became known as the "Queen of the Stage," by public vote in the New York Morning Journal. She lived in New York City. When her mother died in 1896 she left her enough money, along with her own savings to predominantly retire from the stage.
