= Dora Wiley =

American actress

Dora Wiley, c. 1880–1885 (by José Maria Mora)

Dora Wiley (1853 – 2 November 1924) was an American soprano who performed in operas and concerts in the United States, England, and Australia during the last three decades of the 19th century. Nicknamed "The Sweet Singer of Maine", her chief successes were in operettas and comic operas. She enjoyed popularity on the New York stage during the 1880s.

== Life and career ==
Dora Wiley was born in Bucksport, Maine in 1853. Wiley spent her early singing career working as a church and choral singer in Chelsea, Massachusetts and touring with a Boston-based vocal quartet. She first drew significant notice in 1874 when she performed as a soloist with the Boston Philharmonic Club. She then toured actively as a performer with the Berger Family Bell Ringers. In 1878-1879 she sang leading roles with the Boston Ideal Opera Company. In 1880 she performed the title role in Edward E. Rice's Evangeline in Boston. She first appeared on the New York stage in 1881 as the title heroine in the Haverly opera company's production of Gilbert and Sullivan's Patience at the Metropolitan Casino. She returned to the New York stage the following year in several successful operettas produced by the J. W. Norcross Opera Company; including Bettina in Edmond Audran's The Mascot and Violetta in Johann Strauss II's The Merry War.

In 1884 Wiley was the "leading attraction" at the Theatre Royal in Manchester, England in the opera Babes in the Woods. She also toured the English provinces with the company as the title heroine in Luscombe Searelle's comic opera Estrella. Later that year was back in the US and touring out of New York, as the leader of the Dora Wiley Opera Company. Her husband, the equally gifted comic actor Richard Golden, from Bangor, Maine, was initially part of her company, but later engaged Wiley to sing in his own successful play, Old Jed Prouty in 1889. The year before (1888), Wiley sang "Home Sweet Home" at New York's Metropolitan Opera House before President Grover Cleveland and spent a year in Australia, first with the Amy Sherwin Opera Company in Melbourne and then as prima dona in the opera Maritana at the Gaiety Theatre in Sydney.

Wiley divorced Golden in 1892 and then remarried her younger business manager, Charles Tennis. The two initially went to live in Bangor, Maine, but Wiley was back on stage in New York in 1893, and toured until 1895, when she appeared in the western On the Trail. She died at White Plains Hospital in White Plains, New York in 1924 at the age of 71.
