= Richard Golden =

American actor

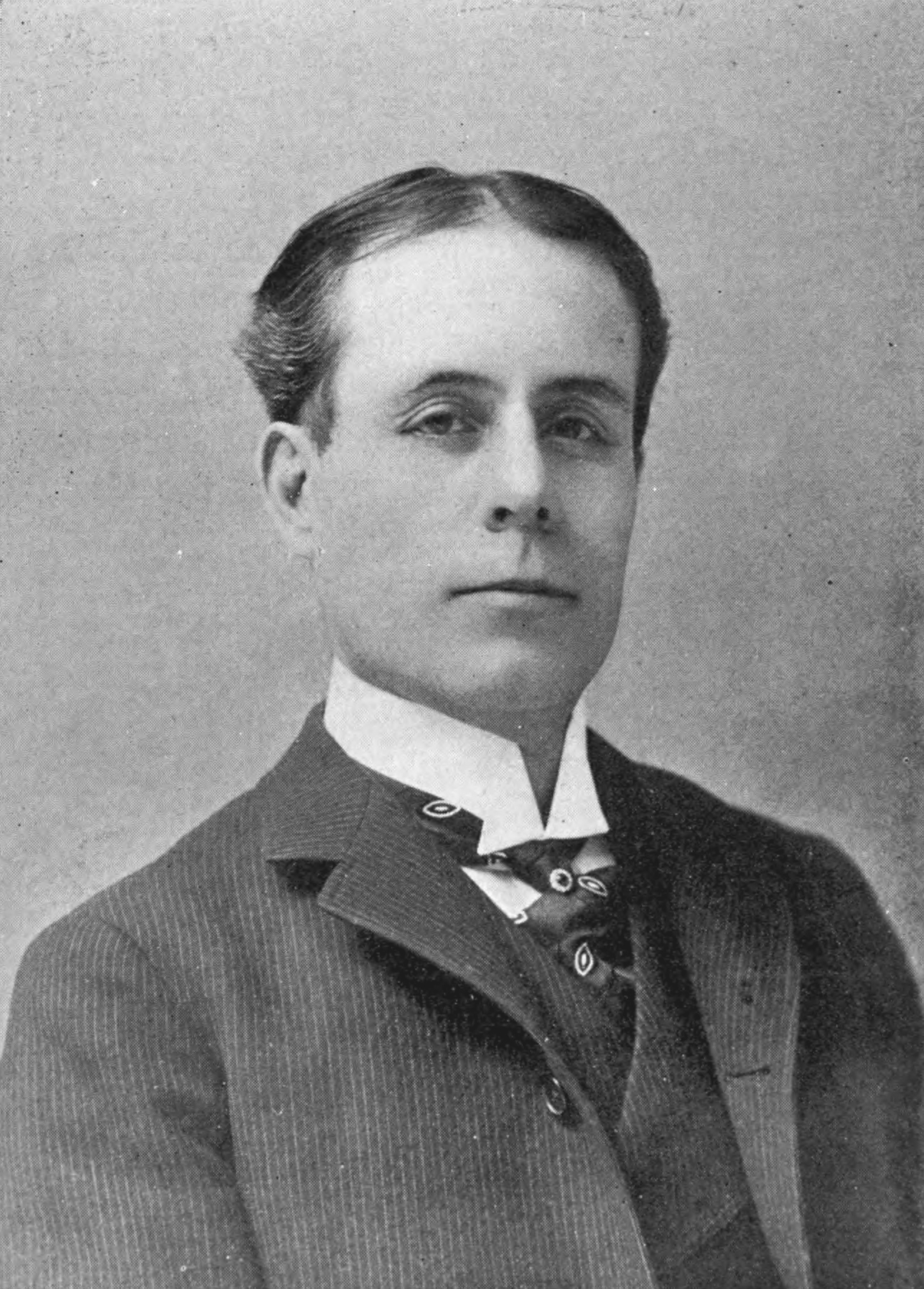
Richard Golden

Richard Golden (1854–1909) was an American stage actor and comedian whose most famous role was "Old Jed Prouty" in his play of the same name. The play helped to create and nationalize the genre of Down East humor, and made Golden one of the celebrated comedians of his generation.

Born in Bangor, Maine, the son of an Irish immigrant and dry goods merchant, Golden joined a Mexican circus (Allie's Allied Shows) touring the U.S. at the age of 13. He later married actor and singer Dora Wiley, and initially toured with her as a member of the "Dora Wiley Opera Company". The company became stranded in Albany, New York in 1885 when it experienced financial difficulties and Golden contracted malaria. The couple's fortunes had turned by 1888 when Wiley sang "Home, Sweet, Home" in front of President Grover Cleveland at the Metropolitan Opera House in New York, and, the following year, Golden impressed audiences in New York, and soon the country, for his portrayal of Old Jed Prouty in his original play of the same name. Wiley had a singing part in the production, and came to be known as "The Sweet Singer of Maine".

Golden's Old Jed Prouty, which he wrote with William Gill, premiered in New York's Union Square Theatre on May 14, 1889, and moved to the Harlem Opera House later that same year. Prouty was a comedic Maine yankee tavern keeper living in the coastal town of Bucksport, the birthplace of his wife Dora Wiley and not far from Golden's own home-town of Bangor. The play began touring nationally in 1890 to rave reviews. Golden would go on to other plays and other parts, but would continually revive Prouty in the course of his career, ultimately playing it over 3,000 times in venues all over the eastern half of the U.S.

Wiley divorced Golden in 1892, married her (much younger) business manager, and returned to her home in Bangor. With Dora gone, Golden shut down Old Jed Prouty by 1893 and joined the Pauline Hall Opera Company at the Tremont Theatre in Boston. By 1895 Golden was broke, and appeared in debtor's court declaring he had "not a cent in the world". The following year (1894) found Golden in the alcoholic's ward at Bellevue Hospital, but by the end of the year he had returned to the stage with a revival of Jed Prouty. Through the rest of the 1890s newspapers alternately reported him "critically ill" (usually in a hotel room), and drawing huge and appreciative crowds in a variety of comic roles. By the end of the decade he was one of the most celebrated stars of American comic opera. Around 1908 he also took a part in the London production of The Dollar Princess, a German light opera.

Golden died suddenly in 1909 on a friend's houseboat in Gravesend Bay, New York, while preparing to return to Maine. He is buried in Bangor's Mount Hope Cemetery.

Golden's daughter Bernice also became a professional actress. She was seriously injured by a piece of falling scenery while playing in The Greyhound at the Astor Theatre in New York, and could not work for several years, but returned to the stage in 1915, first in Chicago, and then in Alice in Wonderland at New York's Booth Theatre.

A historic hotel in the town of Bucksport, Maine, is named "The Jed Prouty Tavern" in honor of Golden's character. Golden himself briefly worked there as a clerk long before he had become a professional actor, when the hotel was called The Robinson House.

== Partial stage roles ==
- The Tourists (1906) (*with Julia Sanderson)
