= New York State Teachers Association =

- Abbreviation: NYSTA
- Merged into: United Teachers of New York (UTNY)
- Successor: New York State United Teachers (NYSUT)
- Formation: 1845
- Dissolved: 1973
- Legal status: Defunct
- Official language: English

The New York State Teachers Association (NYSTA) was an association of teachers in the state of New York, United States, founded in 1845. It assisted teachers in their professional career, provided a public voice for its members on subjects such as pay and tenure, and promoted improvements to the public school system in the state. In 1973 it joined with the United Teachers of New York to form the New York State United Teachers.

== Foundation ==
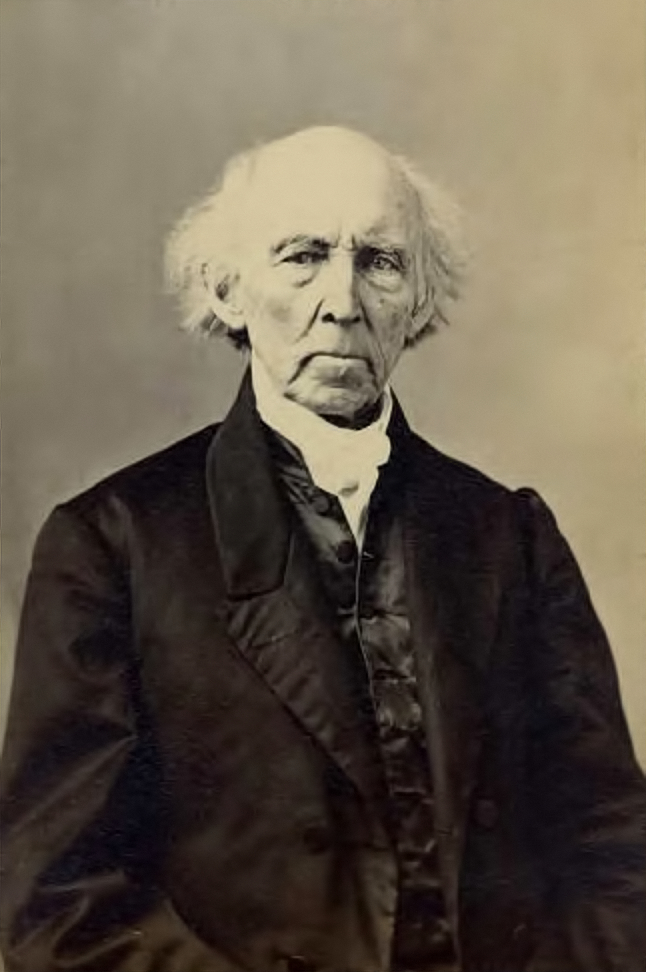
Chester Dewey, first President

The New York State Teachers Association was organized at a teacher's convention on 30 July 1845 in Syracuse, New York. After the convention had resolved itself into a State Teachers' Association a committee was set up to recommend officers, which decided on Chester Dewey (1784–1869) of Rochester as President. The association was incorporated by a legislative act in 1852. It included most of the teachers in upstate New York and Long Island. This was a period when free schools were being established throughout the state, and normal schools were being established to train teachers. The objectives of the association were to support professional improvement of the member teachers and to promote a series of improvements to the public schools in the state.

== History ==
Samuel Buell Woolworth, principal of the Cortland Academy in Homer, New York, was NYSTA president in 1848–49. He was a strong supporter of coeducation. At first women did not have the right to speak at NYSTA meetings, and women teachers were paid much less than men. Thanks to efforts of teachers such as Susan B. Anthony in the 1850s they were eventually admitted as full members. Elizabeth Cady Stanton drafted Anthony's speech on coeducation for the June 1856 NYSTA meeting.

In the late 19th century both state officials and the NYSTA were increasingly concerned about the tendency of local school districts to give teaching certificates to unqualified candidates. In 1887 the NYSTA members lobbied for a bill requiring a standard examination for all teachers in the state. The governor vetoed the bill, but most districts agreed voluntarily to the examination. New York City was among those who did not. Mary Evelyn Hall (1874–1956) became the first president of the NYSTA Library Section in 1910–11, and promoted school libraries in the state. She became president of the NEA Library Department Committee on High School Libraries in 1911.

For most of its history the NYSTA was the New York affiliate of the National Education Association (NEA). Teachers could enhance their professional careers through membership in NYSTA, and often remained involved after retirement. From 1913 the NYSTA House of Delegates represented the interests of active teachers. The New York State Teachers’ Retirement System was established in 1921. From September 1936 the association started to mail out mimeographed circulars to teachers on subjects such as "Tax Reduction versus Tax Limitation," "Why Tenure for Public School Teachers?" "Academic Freedom-Study Outline," "Credit for School Teachers," "Insurance for School Teachers," and "Federal Aid." In 1937 the NYSTA and the School Boards Association founded the New York State Educational Conference Board, which included most of the larger associations of teachers, administrators and parents. The Conference Board developed and promoted proposals to the New York State legislature for increased state funding of schools.

In 1938 it was proposed to add a statement to the section on freedom of speech in the New York Constitution that would explicitly prevent censorship of radio, cinema and other media, although abuse of the right could be prosecuted. The NYSTA and other educational organizations such as the State Education Department and Associated Principals wrote to the Bill of Rights Committee on the subject, but neither supported or opposed the amendment, which was dropped.

By 1946 the NYSTA had a permanent staff, and owned and partly occupied a modern office building. The annual meetings drew many attendees. Achievements of the association included obtaining sufficient state funding for teacher training and public education, having teachers licensed by trained officials, job security through teachers' tenure of position, minimum salaries and rural school consolidation. On 18 November 1951 the first officers were elected to the New York State Retired Teachers’ Association (NYSRTA), which represented the interest of retired teachers.

== Merger ==
In 1973 the NYSTA merged with the United Teachers of New York (UTNY). At the time of the merger the NYSTA had 101,000 members, while the UTNY had 85,000. The NEA-affiliated NYSTA was strong in the upstate, suburban and rural areas, while the UTNY represented teachers downstate and in core of New York City. The UTNY was an affiliate of the American Federation of Teachers (AFT). Albert Shanker, president of the UTNY, was hoping to merge the national NEA and AFT unions. He said, "If we could merge in New York State, we could start a wave that would flow throughout the country and mergers would occur in other states, like Michigan and Illinois and California."

The merger was approved by an overwhelming majority of UTNY members and a solid majority of NYSTA teachers. One of the key issues had been whether the new union should be associated with the AFL–CIO, which the NEA opposed. The merger agreement announced in April 1972 included AFL–CIO membership. Thomas Y. Hobart Jr., who had been elected president of NYSTA in 1971, became the president of combined union. Shanker was elected executive vice-president, but was generally thought to be the more powerful of the two. The merged organization was at first called the New York Congress of Teachers, and later changed its name to the New York State United Teachers (NYSUT).

== Publications ==
- New York State Teachers Association (1932). Educational Monograph.
- Needs, New York State Teachers Association. Committee on Youth (1940). An Educational Program for the Youth of New York State: Report Prepared by the Committee on Youth Needs. New York state teachers association. p. 24.
- D. Emma Wilber Hodge; Lamont Foster Hodge (1945). A Century of Service to Public Education, the Centennial History of the New York State Teachers Association. Albany: New York State Teachers Association. pp. xvi, 350.
- Handbook on Personnel Practices for Teachers: A Handbook of Information on Teachers' Duties, Rights and Responsibilities. The Association. 1954. p. 44.
- New York State Teachers Association. Special Committee to Study Merit Payments (1957). Teacher Merit and Teacher Salary: Report, 1957. New York State Teachers Association. p. 72.

== Sources ==
- "About Us". NYSRTA: New York State Retired Teachers’ Association.
- Berke, Joel S.; Goertz, Margaret E.; Coley, Richard J. (1985-05-21). Politicians, Judges, and City Schools: Reforming School Finance in New York. Russell Sage Foundation. ISBN 978-1-61044-047-9.
- Clifford, Geraldine J. (2014-09-19). Those Good Gertrudes: A Social History of Women Teachers in America. JHU Press. ISBN 978-1-4214-1433-1.
- Congdon, Randolph T. (July 1946). "Review: A Century of Service to Public Education, the Centennial History of the New York State Teachers Association". New York History. 27 (3). New York State Historical Association. JSTOR 23148058.
- Collins, Christina (2015-04-24). Ethnically Qualified: Race, Merit, and the Selection of Urban Teachers, 1920 - 1980. Teachers College Press. ISBN 978-0-8077-7150-1.
- Dearstyne, Bruce W. (2015-03-24). The Spirit of New York: Defining Events in the Empire State's History. SUNY Press. ISBN 978-1-4384-5659-1.
- Gaffney, Dennis (2012-02-01). Teachers United: The Rise of New York State United Teachers. SUNY Press. ISBN 978-0-7914-7959-9.
- H. H. (September 1937). "Review: Public Information Service, by NEW YORK STATE TEACHERS ASSOCIATION. Albany, New York". The Clearing House. 12 (1). Taylor & Francis. JSTOR 30174915.
- Kahlenberg, Richard D. (2009-07-01). Tough Liberal: Albert Shanker and the Battles Over Schools, Unions, Race, and Democracy. Columbia University Press. ISBN 978-0-231-13497-2.
- Kirk, Hyland Clare (1883). A History of the New York State Teachers' Association: With Sketches of Its Presidents and Prominent Members. E. L. Kellog & Company.
- Meyer, Bernard S.; Agata, Burton C.; Agata, Seth H. (2013-08-13). The History of the New York Court of Appeals: 1932-2003. Columbia University Press. ISBN 978-0-231-50990-9.
- Miller, Marilyn Lea (2003). Pioneers and Leaders in Library Services to Youth: A Biographical Dictionary. Libraries Unlimited. ISBN 978-1-59158-028-7.
- Sweeney, Martin A. (2011-07-27). Lincoln's Gift from Homer, New York: A Painter, an Editor and a Detective. McFarland. ISBN 978-0-7864-8718-9.
