= George H. Jessop =

Irish playwright, journalist and novelist

George Henry Jessop (1852 – 21 March 1915) was an Irish playwright, librettist, journalist, and novelist. Born in Ireland and educated at Trinity College Dublin, Jessop began his career as a writer working for magazines in London before moving to California in 1873. (Note: According to Loeber, Loeber, & Mullin, sources that had previously claimed Jessop left Ireland for California in 1872 were not accurate.) There he worked as both a journalist and newspaper editor for five years before beginning a career as a playwright in the United States. His first play, A Gentleman from Nevada (1879), was a success and had a profitable run at Broadway's Fifth Avenue Theatre. This work was eclipsed by his third play, Sam'l of Posen; or, The Commercial Drummer (1881), which brought both fame and fortune to its star, the actor M. B. Curtis, who purchased the rights to the work outright from Jessop. It was notably the first play in the history of American theatre to present a positive portrayal of a Jewish character.

In 1882 Jessop began a prolific partnership with the dramatist William Gill with whom he co-authored several successful stage works; many of which were performed on Broadway, including In Paradise (1882), Facts, or His Little Hatchet (1883), A Bottle of Ink (1884), and Mam’zelle, or the Little Milliner (1885). Ultimately their partnership dissolved after co-authoring a string of flops that included Muddles (1885), Bluff (1885), and Aphrodite Still in the Ring (1886). In 1887 their relationship soured and the pair parted on poor terms.

Following the collapse of his partnership with Gill, Jessop continued to co-author plays with the playwrights Brander Matthews and Augustus Pitou in addition to authoring the plays Myles Aroon (1888) and Mavourneen (1891) on his own. With Matthews he also co-authored the novel A Tale of Twenty-five Hours (1892), and alone he wrote two novels about Irish-American life: the semi-autobiographical novel Gerald Ffrench's Friends (originally published as a serialized novel in The Century Magazine in 1888 and 1889) and the mystery novel Judge Lynch: A Romance of the California Vineyards (1889). In the early 1890s he returned to Ireland before ultimately settling in London where he remained until his death in 1915. His later career as a writer in Europe was not prolific and was limited to the opera libretti for Charles Villiers Stanford's Shamus O'Brien (c. 1894) and Sidney Jones's My Lady Molly (1902), and two romance novels set in Ireland: Desmond O'Connor: the Romance of an Irish Soldier (originally published as a serialized novel in Munsey's Magazine in 1908; published as a book in 1914) and Where the Shamrock Grows: The Fortunes and Misfortunes of an Irish Family (1911).

== Early life and career ==
George Henry Jessop was born in Doory Hall, Ballymahon, County Longford, in 1852. He was the brother of the Irish writer Mary Kathleen Jessop and their parents were Frederick Thomas Jessop and Elizabeth Low. He was educated at Trinity College Dublin where he studied law and letters.

Jessop moved to California in 1873 after having previously worked as a writer for magazines in London. He was active as a journalist and newspaper editor from 1873 through 1878; working for Bret Harte at the Overland Monthly in San Francisco. Jessop wrote his first play, A Gentleman from Nevada, while living in California. The work premiered in Detroit, Michigan in 1879 with a cast led by the actor J. B. Polk. The play toured and had a successful Broadway run at the Fifth Avenue Theatre which began on April 27, 1879. His second play, All At Sea, premiered on June 3, 1881, and its tour reached Broadway's San Francisco Minstrels Music Hall on April 17, 1882.

His third play, Sam'l of Posen; or, The Commercial Drummer, was his greatest achievement as a playwright and had a successful national tour that included a twelve-week long run on Broadway in 1881. The play brought its star, the actor M. B. Curtis, both fame and fortune. Curtis purchased the play outright from Jessop, and reaped the financial profits as a result. With the assistance of Edward Marble, Curtis made modifications to the play's dialogue and structure; creating a final fourth act of the work by extending the final scene of the third act. It is most likely this revised version which was published in America's Lost Plays, Vol. IV (2019, Wildside Press).

== Partnership with William Gill ==
Jessop's Sam’l of Posen was followed by another commercially successful play, In Paradise (1882) which he co-authored with dramatist William Gill as a starring vehicle for the actor John T. Raymond. It had a successful national tour which included two separate runs in New York City; first at the Grand Opera House and later at Broadway's Windsor Theater. Other stops on the tour included performances at the Park Theatre, Brooklyn, Grand Opera House, St. Louis, and the McVicker's Theater in Chicago among other venues. This was the first of several successful plays co-authored by Jessop and Gill.

Jessop's second collaboration with Gill was the play An Old Stager or, That Angel Mac which they co-authored for the husband and wife acting team William J. Florence and Malvina Pray Florence for performance at the Holliday Street Theater in Baltimore in March 1883. They authored a second play for the pair, Facts, or His Little Hatchet, which was given its premiere at the Walnut Street Theater in Philadelphia in September 1883. This second play was tremendously profitable and became the greatest success for the Florences in their acting careers; remaining in their regularly performed repertoire for the next six years including multiple runs at Broadway theatres.

Along with Fred Maeder and Clay Greene, Jessop was one of several writers who contributed to modifications made to Gill's hit musical My Sweetheart after it premiered in 1881. The work turned the actress Minnie Palmer into an international star; and had a lengthy run in London's West End in addition to spending years touring the United States, Europe, and Australia in the 1880s, 1890s, and the 1900s. Palmer was still appearing in the role as late as February 1907 at the Perth Theatre; more than 25 years after she originated the role of Tina.

The next collaboration between Jessop and Gill, their 1884 play Stolen Money, was their first critical failure. The work was a stage adaptation of Charles Reade's 1884 novel Single Heart and Double Face and was skewered in reviews from the New York press. They rebounded later that year with a popular if not critical success, writing the libretto for the musical A Bottle of Ink (1884 premiere in Boston; 1885, Comedy Theater, Broadway), which starred soprano Ida Mülle, the comic actor Jefferson De Angelis, and the actress Hattie Starr. This was followed soon after by the libretto for Mam’zelle, or the Little Milliner, which was written for and starred the French soprano Marie Aimée who was the leading star of French operetta on the American stage during the 19th century. This work premiered on 5 September 1884 in Kingston, New York and toured to Syracuse, Buffalo, Rochester, and Brooklyn before finally settling in for a successful run at Broadway's Fifth Avenue Theater. The work later became a successful vehicle for Jennie Kimball's opera company who toured widely in the work after purchasing the rights to the piece following Aimée's death in 1887. It was revived on Broadway in 1888 with Alice Harrison in the title part.

On 2 March 1885, Jessop and Gill's supposedly original play Muddles premiered at the Imperial Theatre in London in a production produced by and starring the actor Harry St. Maur who later performed the work again in a run at the Prince of Wales Theatre, Liverpool. In reality, the work contained a significant portion of material authored by Gill earlier for his 1884 musical flop Two Bad Men which he had created in collaboration with the composer Gustave Kerker for the American stage. Jessop was presumably brought in to assist in an attempted rescue of this failed work by altering it into a farce for the London stage in which it was retitled Muddles. The London press ridiculed the work, and Muddles was the first of a series of flops suffered by the Jessop and Gill creative partnership. These included two failures on the American stage: Bluff (1885) and Aphrodite Still in the Ring (1886); the final stage works co-authored by Jessop and Gill that were performed.

By 1887 Jessop and Gill's partnership had dissolved and the two men were no longer on good terms with one another. In April 1887 newspapers announced the future staging of a play in San Francisco that was credited to Jessop, The Noblest Roman of Them All. This announcement angered Gill who wrote a public letter denouncing Jessop for not including his name as one of the primary authors of the work. That play was never performed. A planned new work by the Gill and Jessop creative team for the actress Leonora Bradley was supposed to premiere in London in the summer of 1887 but was abandoned and never materialized.

== Novelist and playwright in New York City ==
Following the collapse of his partnership with Gill, Jessop's output as a writer widened to include novels in addition to works written for the American theater. In both genres he sometimes worked with other writers. By himself he authored the plays Myles Aroon (1888) and Mavourneen (1891), and with Augustus Pitou he co-authored The Power of the Press (1892).

During his years as a rising playwright in the 1880s, Jessop had relocated from California to New York City where he contributed to several New York-based magazines; including Puck, Judge, and The Century Magazine. He authored two novels about Irish-American life, the first of which, Gerald Ffrench's Friends, began its life as a serialized novel published in The Century Magazine in 1888 and 1889 before being published as a complete novel in book form by Longmans, Green and Company in 1889. Set in San Francisco in the year 1874, this work was semi-autobiographical and its title character was largely based on Jessop's lived experiences as a struggling Irish immigrant and "hand-to-mouth journalist" in San Francisco during the 1870s.

Jessop's second novel, Judge Lynch: A Romance of the California Vineyards, was also published in 1889 but by Belford, Clarke & Company, and is a mystery novel that centers around a crooked Irish-American political boss, Pat Byrne. This work was originally envisioned as a play and began its life in that genre in a collaborative project with the writer Brander Matthews. Matthews ultimately abandoned the project, and Jessop proceeded by turning the story into a novel on his own. However, Jessop and Matthews did complete two plays together which they co-authored in 1889: A Gold Mine and On Probation. With Matthews he also co-authored the novel A Tale of Twenty-five Hours (1892).

== Later life and career in Europe ==
Jessop returned to Ireland sometime in the early 1890s. In 1891 he inherited the Marlfield estate in County Dublin after the death of his cousin Catherine Jessop, and it is likely that his return to Europe occurred as a result of this event. He continued to be active as a writer both in Ireland, and in London where he ultimately settled. However, Jessop's output after leaving the United States was sparse in comparison to his time writing in America and was limited mainly to writing libretti for the opera stage. He wrote the libretti for Charles Villiers Stanford's Shamus O'Brien (c. 1894) and Sidney Jones's My Lady Molly (1902); works which musical theatre historian Kurt Gänzl stated "were perhaps his two best pieces for the musical stage". He also published two romance novels set in Ireland: Desmond O'Connor: the Romance of an Irish Soldier (originally published as a serialized novel in Munsey's Magazine in 1908; published as a book in 1914) and Where the Shamrock Grows; The Fortunes and Misfortunes of an Irish Family (1911).

Having never married, Jessop died in Hampstead, London on 21 March 1915.
