= Nanette Comstock =

American stage actress (1866–1942)

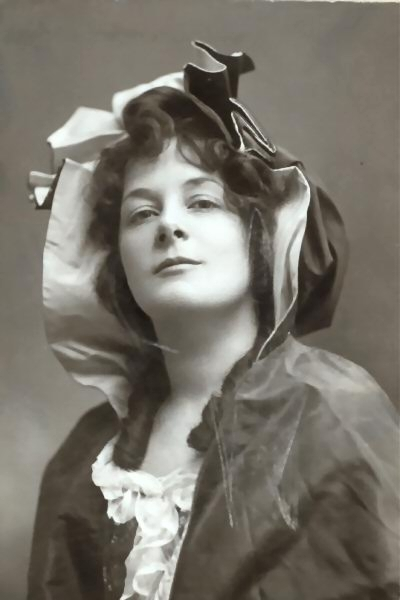
- Born: July 17, 1866; Albany, New York, US
- Died: June 22, 1942 (aged 75); New York City, US
- Occupation: Actor

Nanette Comstock (July 17, 1866 – June 24, 1942) was an American actress whose career on stage spanned nearly 35 years. She appeared on both the New York and London stage and had shared the stage with many of the luminaries of the late 19th and early 20th centuries.

== Early life ==
She was born in Albany, New York, the daughter of Anna Stewart and Alexander Cromwell Comstock and the niece of the New York politician Isaac Newton Comstock. Her brother, Alexander (d. 1909), was a noted theatre manager and the husband of actress Myrtle Edwards. At about the age of sixteen Comstock’s family relocated to New York City.

== Career ==
Comstock made her professional stage debut at the Fourteenth Street Theatre on September 12, 1887, as the telegraph operator in the Charles Hale Hoyt farce A Hole in the Ground. At the Madison Square Theatre on December 5 of the following year, she played Kate in Dion Boucicault’s Kerry, and after receiving acting instructions under Boucicault at a theatrical school affiliated with the A. M. Palmer Stock Company, she appeared on March 4, 1889, at the Fifth Avenue Theatre with Nat C. Goodwin playing Una Foxwood in the Brander Matthews and George Jessop play A Gold Mine. Comstock supported Kate Claxton at Madison Square Theatre on August 10, 1889, in a stage adaption of the John Strange Winter novel Bootle's Baby. Her next significant roles came in the Bronson Howard drama Shenandoah over its long run that began on September 9, 1889, at the Star Theatre and later transferred to Proctor's Theatre. Comstock opened with Shenandoah in the part of Madeline West and later assumed the role of Jenny Buckthorn, originally played by Effie Shannon.

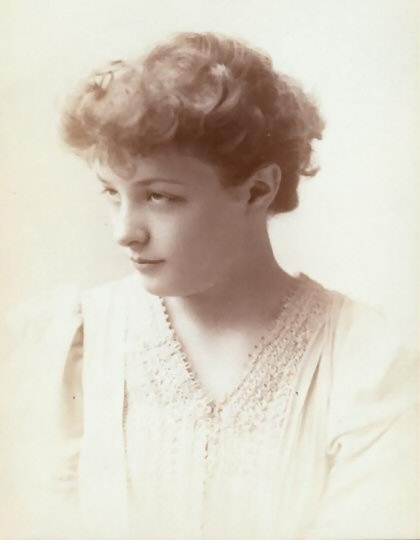
Nanette Comstock

In 1891 she toured as Lady May in Mavourreen, an Irish musical written by George Jessop for William J. Scanlan, and on October 31, 1892, Comstock played Valentine at the Standard Theatre in The Family Circle, a Sydney Rosenfeld adaptation of Bisson's Rue Pigalle 115. Comstock was the original Kitty Verdun in the American production of Charley's Aunt at the Standard Theatre on October 2, 1894, and on May 10 in London at the Adelphi Theatre, she played Wilbur's Ann in the David Belasco and Franklyn Fyles drama The Girl I Left Behind Me. Comstock later toured with Joseph Jefferson playing Bertha in a stage adaption of the Charles Dickens novella The Cricket on the Hearth and appeared with Henry Miller playing his sister Alice Temple in Heartsease, a romantic drama by Joseph I.C. Clarke and Charles Klein, staged at the Garden Theatre on January 11, 1897.

On January 3, 1898, Comstock was back in London at the Globe Theatre as Sylvia in John Hare’s production of Martha Morton's A Bachelor's Romance. She toured the U.S. performing the same role opposite Sol Smith Russell, the original star of A Bachelor’s Romance. Comstock next toured with Wilton Lackaye playing Mrs. Blake in Charles O'Malley, from the novels by Charles Lever, and later toured with Charles Dickson in his play Mistakes Will Happen. Comstock closed the century in tours with Otis Skinner playing Lady Jessica in Henry James' The Liars, the Princess in Prince Otto, Skinner’s adaptation from the novel by Robert Louis Stevenson, and Annabelle in the Mary Hartwell Catherwood story Lazarre.

In 1900, Comstock starred as Alice Adams to Howard Kyle's title character in the Clyde Fitch hit romantic drama Nathan Hale. At the Manhattan Theatre on February 6, 1901, she played Mary Larkin in Lovers’ Lane, another Clyde Fitch play. That year and over the next several, Comstock appeared in New York and on tour as Sally Sartoris opposite John B. Mason in the Madeline Lucette Ryley comedy The Altar of Friendship; as Martha Ladbrook with Henrietta Crosman in Joan o' the Shoals by Evelyn Greenleaf Sutherland; as Marjorie Leighton with William Collier, Sr. in the Robert Edeson drama The Diplomat; as Ethel Willing, with William Collier, Sr. in Eugene Presbrey's play Personal; as Molly Wood, with Dustin Farnum in The Virginian, an early stage adaptation of the Owen Wister novel; as Lucy, with William Collier, Sr. in The Dictator, a farce by Richard Harding Davis; and starred as Virginia Carvel in an adaptation of the Winston Churchill novel The Crisis.

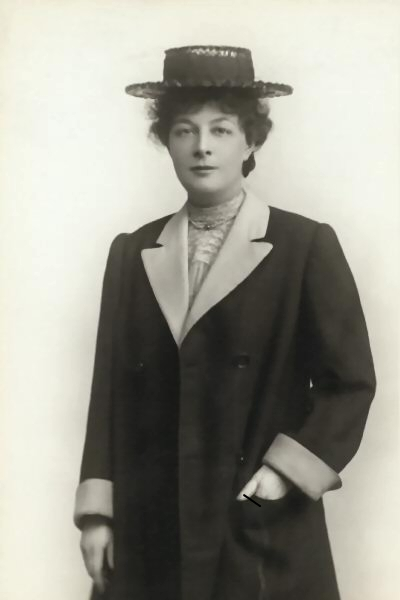
Nanette Comstock

In 1905, Comstock toured as Grace Whitney with Raymond Hitchcock in the Richard Harding Davis farce The Galloper, and the following year appeared in the play’s January 6 New York debut at the Garden Theatre. She returned to London in May 1906 to play Shirley Rossmore in Charles Klein’s The Lion and the Mouse at the Duke of York's Theatre, and afterward, spent the next few seasons with William Collier, Sr. in productions of George Nash’s On the Quiet and Collier’s popular Caught in the Rain. On September 7, 1908, Comstock played the title role in the Louis Lovell play Jet at the Columbia Theatre in Washington, D.C. The following year, she co-starred with Robert C. Hilliard as The Mother in a long run of the Porter Emerson Browne tale A Fool There Was from the Rudyard Kipling poem The Vampiers. In December 1912, with the National Federation of Theatre Clubs, Comstock appeared at the Berkeley Lyceum, New York, as Gertrude in the Ethelyn Emery Keays play His Wife By His Side.

== Later life ==
Comstock’s career continued for nearly a decade with her last Broadway appearance coming in 1922 at the Playhouse Theatre as Mary in the March–June run of the Owen Davis drama Up the Ladder. She had been the wife of Frank Burbeck, a Boston-born actor who had played the part of The General in the original stage production of Shenandoah. Burbeck, a long-time character actor on stage, film and radio, died at the age 74 on February 20, 1930, nearly 13 years after he remarried.

== Death ==
Comstock died of a heart attack on June 22, 1942, at her residence on 143rd Street in New York City.
