= Sam'l of Posen; or, The Commercial Drummer =

Play by George H. Jessop

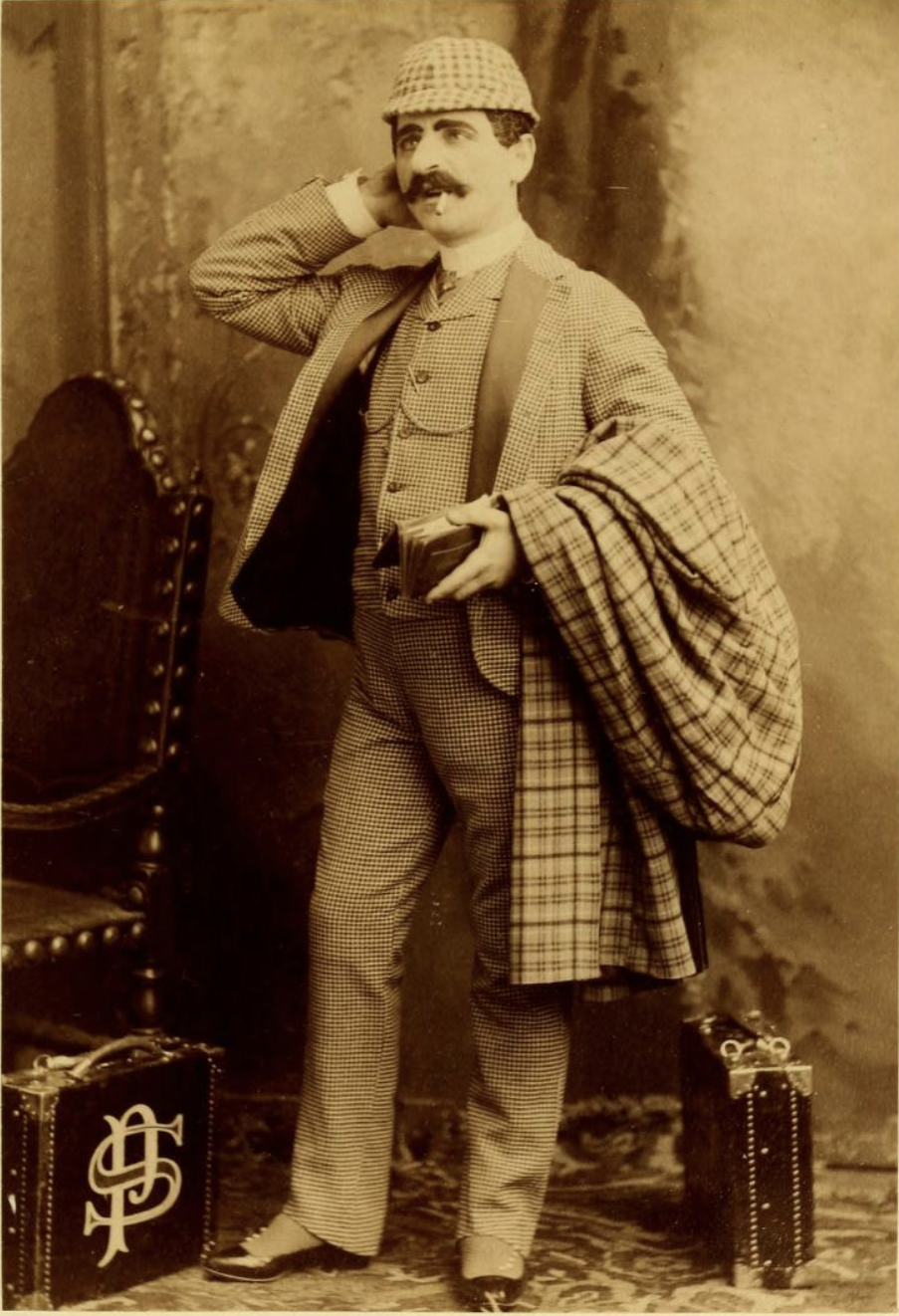
M. B. Curtis as Sam'l of Posen

Sam'l of Posen; or, The Commercial Drummer is a play by the Irish-born dramatist George H. Jessop. Described as a "comic melodrama", the play is regarded as the first work in the history of American theatre to present a positive portrayal of a Jewish character. The character of the Jewish immigrant traveling salesman Samuel Plastrick was created out of a style of humor that originated among Jewish comedians in American music halls, and was the first Jewish character in an English-language play that invited audiences to laugh with a Jewish character rather than at them; a concept which was highly successful in the United States from the play's inception in 1881 but which was ridiculed by critics and audiences when the play was first performed in England. While progressive for its time, the role has also been criticized for introducing a stereotype of a particular type of Jewish character into the literary canon.

The role of Samuel Plastrick brought both fame and fortune to the Jewish-American actor M. B. Curtis whose portrayal of the Jewish pedlar, an occupation known as a "drummer" in 19th century America, was wildly popular with American audiences. After an initial production in New York City, Posen toured in the role successfully for two years before purchasing the rights to the play outright from Jessop. After this, he made several modifications to the work with the assistance of one of his co-stars, the actor and comedian Edward Marble, with whom he transformed the play from a three act work to a four act work. He continued to tour widely in the role for decades.

== History ==
Sam'l of Posen; or, The Commercial Drummer premiered in New York City at J.H. Haverly's Fourteenth Street Theatre on May 16, 1881. Considered Jessop's best play, the work was a tremendous hit for its star, the actor M. B. Curtis. Curtis portrayed Samuel Plastrick, a Jewish cocksure 'drummer' (a 19th-century slang term for a traveling salesman) originally from Posen, Poland who had immigrated to the United States.

Sam'l of Posen was originally written in 3 Acts. In 1883 Curtis purchased the rights to the play outright from Jessop, after which he made numerous modifications to the work with the aid of the actor and comedian Edward Marble. The largest change to the play was transporting the final scene of the third act into a fourth act in which that scene's length was greatly extended. It is likely this altered version of the play, and not the original, that was published in America's Lost Plays, Vol. IV (2019, Wildside Press).

Curtis went on to make a fortune through touring widely in the part throughout the 1880s. The play also starred Curtis's wife, the actress Albina de Mer.

== Original cast ==
- M. B. Curtis as Samuel Plastrick
- Edward Marble as West Point
- Albina De Mer as Celeste
- Welsh Edwards as Winslow
- Frank Losee as Frank Kilday
- Nelson Decker as Jack Chevoit
- Chas. Rosene as Con Quinn and Uncle Goldstein
- Walter Eytinge as Folliot Footlight
- Gerald Elmar as Fitzurse
- Gertie Granville as Rebecca
- Carrie Wyatt as Ellen
- Fanny Rouse as Mrs. Mulcahey

== Critical reception and legacy ==
Sam'l of Posen; or, The Commercial Drummer had a significant influence on the film maker D. W. Griffith and was used as an inspiration for two films he directed in 1908: Romance of a Jewess and Old Isaacs, the Pawnbroker. The cities of Albany, New York and Berkeley, California both have streets named Posen Avenue which are named after Jessop's play; largely in connection to the actor M. B. Curtis's history with those cities.
