= Comstock (surname) =

Comstock is a surname of English origin. Notable people with the surname include:

- A. B. Comstock (1857–1937), American politician
- Ada Comstock (1876–1973), U.S. women's education pioneer
- Adam Comstock (1740–1819), Revolutionary War veteran and New York politician
- Albert C. Comstock (1845–1910), New York lawyer and politician
- Anna Botsford Comstock (1854–1930), U.S. artist, educator, and conservationist
- Anthony Comstock (1844–1915), U.S. moral reformer and namesake of the Comstock laws
- Barbara Comstock (born 1959), member of the U.S. House of Representatives
- Bobby Comstock (1941–2020), American rock and roll singer
- Charles Carter Comstock (1818–1900), U.S. politician from Michigan
- Christopher Comstock (1635–1702), early settler of Norwalk, Connecticut and a deputy of the General Assembly of the Colony of Connecticut
- Christopher Comstock (born 1992), birth name of Marshmello, American electronic dance music producer and DJ
- Cicero Comstock (1817–1871), Wisconsin state senator, Milwaukee comptroller
- Cyrus B. Comstock (1831–1910), U.S. Army corps of engineers officer, member of the NAS
- Rev. Cyrus Comstock (1765–1853), New York State preacher and inventor of the horse-drawn buckboard wagon.
- Daniel Frost Comstock (1883–1970), U.S. physicist and engineer
- Daniel Webster Comstock (1840–1917), U.S. politician from Indiana
- Dorothy Comstock Riley (1924–2004), lawyer and judge from the U.S. state of Michigan
- Frank Comstock (1922–2013), American music arranger, composer and conductor
- Frank Comstock (politician) (1856–1914), American politician
- George F. Comstock (1811–1892), Chief Judge of the New York Court of Appeals 1860–1861
- George G. Comstock (1855–1934), American astronomer
- Helen Field Comstock (1840–1930), American poet, philanthropist
- Henry Tompkins (or Thomas) Paige Comstock (1820–1870), American miner after whom Comstock Lode was named
- Harriet Theresa Comstock (1860–1925), American novelist and author of children's books
- Isaac N. Comstock (1808–1883), American politician and prison warden form New York
- John H. Comstock (1904–1993), American politician from Nebraska
- John Henry Comstock (1849–1931), U.S. entomologist, co-creator of the Comstock-Needham system
- Keith Comstock (born 1955), major league baseball player
- Nanette Comstock (1866–1942), Broadway actress
- Noah D. Comstock (1832–1890), American politician
- Oliver C. Comstock (1780–1860), U.S. politician from New York
- Samuel Comstock (1680–1752), member of the Connecticut House of Representatives from Norwalk, Connecticut
- Solomon Gilman Comstock (1842–1933), U.S. politician from Minnesota
- William Comstock (1877–1949), Governor of Michigan
- William Henry Comstock (1830–1919), American-Canadian businessman and politician

Fictional characters:

- Earl Comstock, character in Neal Stephenson's novel Cryptonomicon
- Gordon Comstock, character in George Orwell's novel Keep the Aspidistra Flying
- Julian Comstock, character in Robert Charles Wilson's novel Julian Comstock: A Story of 22nd-Century America
- Radborne Comstock, character in Elizabeth Hand's novel Mortal Love
- Roger Comstock, character in Neal Stephenson's The Baroque Cycle of novels
- Zachary Hale Comstock, main antagonist in the video game BioShock Infinite
- Magenta Comstock: historical figure within the universe of the Harry Potter franchise
