= Maurice Curtis =

American actor

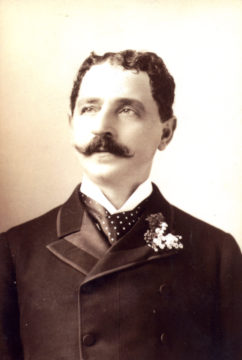
- Born: Mauritz Bertram Strelinger; 1849; Nagyselmec, Kingdom of Hungary (now Liptovská Štiavnica, Slovakia)
- Died: c. 1920 (aged 70–71)
- Criminal charge: Murder
- Criminal status: Acquitted

Maurice Curtis (1849 – 1920), stage name M. B. Curtis, was an American stage actor, producer, and real estate developer, at one point tried and acquitted of a policeman's murder. He achieved fame in the title role of George H. Jessop's 1881 play Sam'l of Posen; or, The Commercial Drummer.

== Biography ==
Mauritz Bertram Strelinger was born in 1849 as proved by the entry in the Strelinger family Bible. He was born to a Jewish family in Nagy Selmetz, a Hungarian town that is now in Slovakia outside of Ruzomberok.

He came to the United States in 1856 as a six year old with his family. He tried to join the Union Army as a drummer boy, but was refused due to extreme youth. He held various jobs in Detroit and then Chicago but was very drawn to the theatre. He eventually got a job at McVickers Theatre in Chicago and began a stage career.

He performed in over 200 roles from low comedy to Shakespeare and always received great praise in newspaper reviews. He cut his teeth in San Francisco and Montreal in the 1870s. He was best known for starring as Samuel Plastrick, the lead character in the comic melodrama Sam'l of Posen; or, The Commercial Drummer by George H. Jessop. It was first produced in Georgia in 1879, according to Curtis, and opened in New York on May 16, 1881, after a national tour, having previously been rejected by all New York theatre owners and is credited as introducing the first salesman as hero character.

In 1883, Curtis purchased the copyright of the play from Jessop and continued using the Plastrick character into the 1890s. Though there are many quoted sources for the character of Sam'l after it brought Curtis meteoric fame and fortune, the character was a Jewish "drummer", or traveling salesman, and Curtis claimed he based his portrayal of him on a real salesman in San Francisco, claiming, "He was, perhaps, one of the most comical men that I ever met; and for the life of me I could never refrain from giving imitations of him." Curtis also claimed to have thought of the character while waiting for a train in Texas and others claimed credit as well. The role earned him substantial fame and wealth amounting to US$250,000 ($8,958,333 today).

He was the only private citizen to ever pay to keep the Statue of Liberty lit.

Curtis used some of his income to invest in developing real estate in Berkeley, California. He began building the Peralta Park Hotel in 1888; the structure, with its sixty rooms and twenty baths, opened in 1891. The building was later converted into a Catholic school until its demolition in 1959.

A year after the building opened, Curtis was arrested for drunken behavior. The arresting officer, Alexander Grant, was shot and killed and, though Curtis denied responsibility, he was indicted for murder. Witnesses claimed he was found at the scene with an abrasion on the wrist indicating he had been struggling with someone, and he was heard saying, "My God! I'd give the world to get back to the last four hours!" Nevertheless, he was found not guilty in 1893 after four trials, two hung juries, and a procedural dismissal, but both his finances and reputation were ruined.

Curtis revived his Plastrick show. He tempered the stereotypical or crude aspects of the character and, by 1894, one reviewer noted, "Nobody, whether Jew or Gentile, could find offence in this amiable, ingenious and kind hearted young Israelite." With this change, the character was less successful overseas, however. Curtis attempted one performance in London on July 4, 1895, and one historian noted the "puzzling afternoon" was "beyond the grasp" of the audience, who expected to laugh at the Jewish character rather than with him.

In 1899, Curtis founded the M. B. Curtis Afro-American Minstrel Company (sometimes called the Afro-American All Star Carnival), which began a world tour specifically to compete with a similar troupe overseen by Orpheus McAdoo. Once in Australia, Curtis abandoned the group and Ernest Hogan stepped up as manager in his place.

== Gallery ==
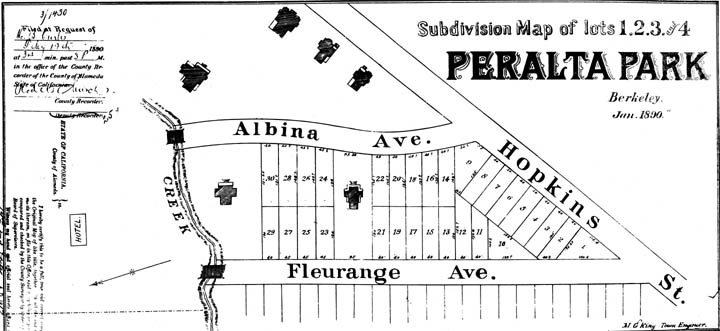

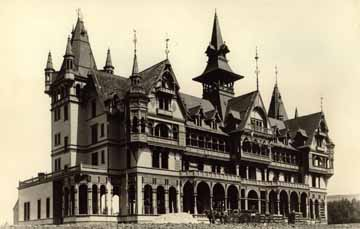

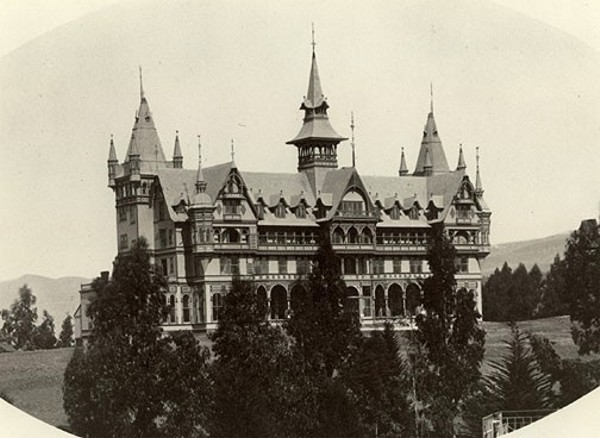

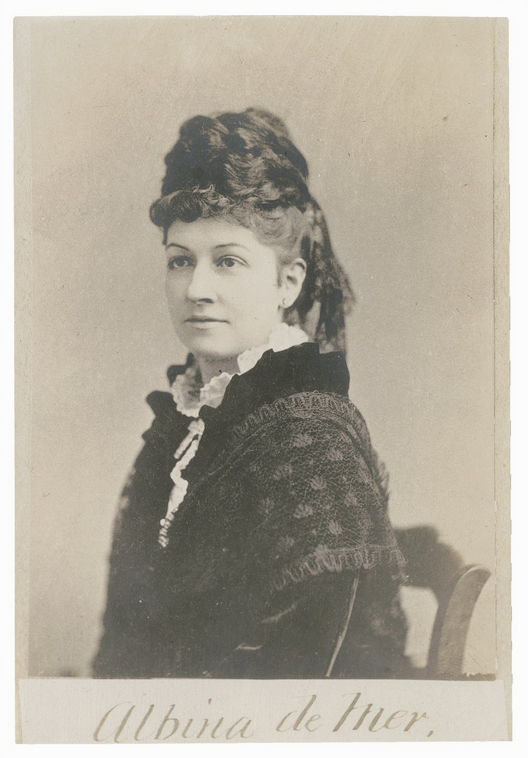

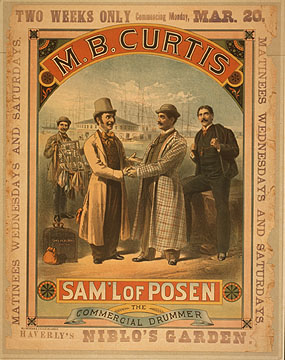

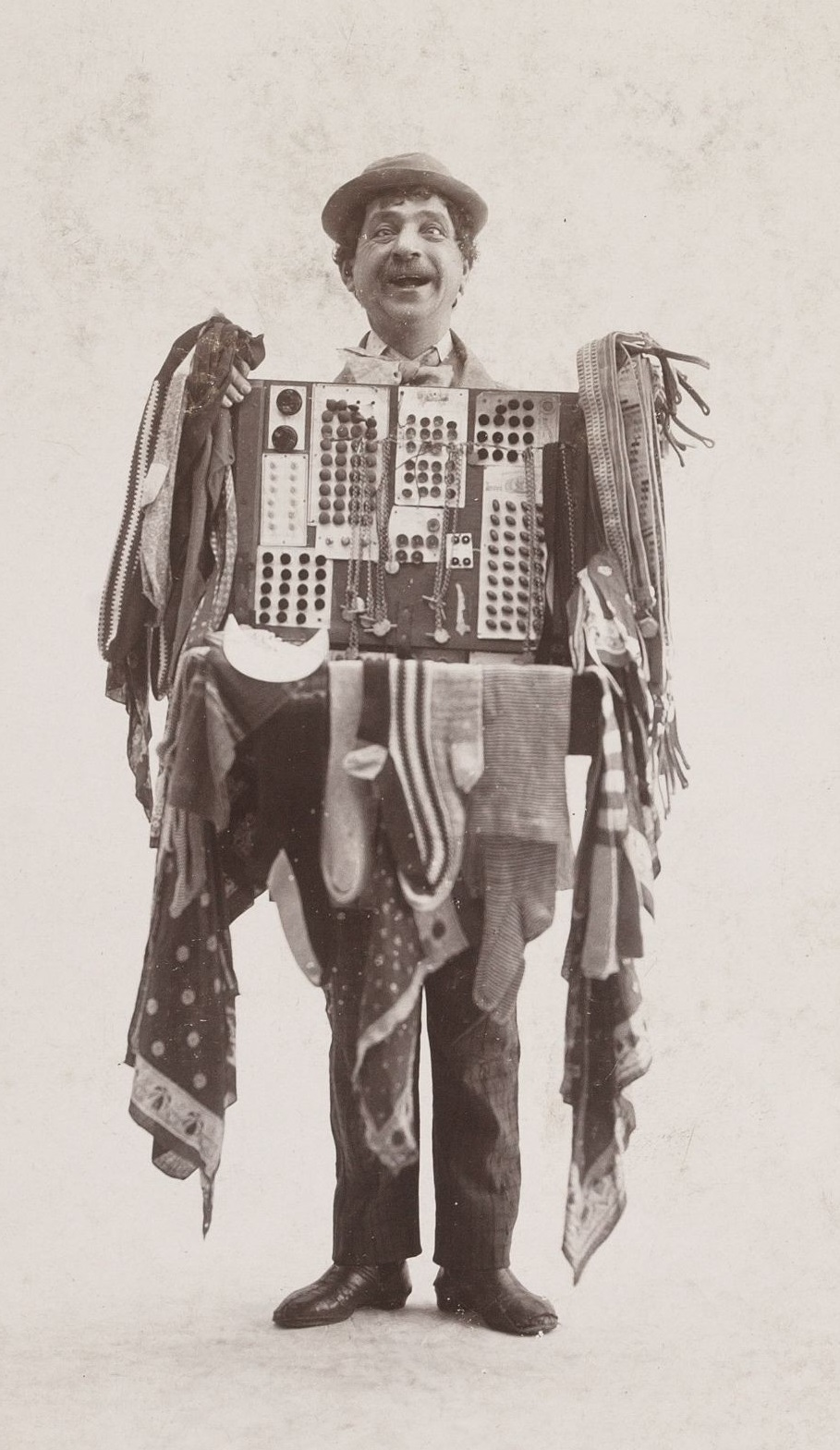
