= Daniel Comstock =

Daniel Comstock may refer to:

- Daniel Frost Comstock (1883–1970), American physicist and engineer
- Daniel Webster Comstock (1840–1917), U.S. Representative from Indiana

== See also ==
- Comstock (surname)
