= Eliza Field =

Eliza Field may refer to:

- Elizabeth Field (author) (1804–1890), English-born Canadian writer and artist
- Eliza Riddle Field (1812–1871), American stage actress
