= Joseph M. Field =

English-American actor and dramatist (1810–1856)

Joseph M. Field (1810 – January 28, 1856) was an English-born American actor and dramatist.

== Biography ==
He was born in London, came to America when very young, and for several years traveled through the country writing plays and acting them without attaining much reputation. In 1852 he assumed the management of a theatre in St. Louis, Missouri, where he was also later principal owner and an editor of the Reveille, a daily newspaper. At the same time he became widely known for his humorous sketches signed "Straws" in the New Orleans Picayune.

On, November 6, 1837, Field married actress Eliza Riddle, with whom he had co-starred in several performances. Their daughter, Kate Field, was born in 1838, and went on to become a successful journalist and author. From 1841–1842, he traveled in Europe as an international reporter for the Picayune.

Field seemingly attended the Boston Lyceum lecture in October 1845 when Edgar Allan Poe controversially recited a version of "Al Aaraaf" and later declaimed the incident as an attempted hoax. Poe wrote directly to Field enlisting his help in defense against the Boston "Frogpondians".

Among his plays was Family Ties, written for Dan Marble for a prize of $500. He also wrote a dramatic response to Harriet Beecher Stowe's 1852 novel Uncle Tom's Cabin which he staged in New Orleans.

Field established the Grand Opera House in St. Louis in 1852.

He died at a hotel in Mobile, Alabama on January 28, 1856, and was buried at Mount Auburn Cemetery, near where his daughter was studying.

== Plays ==
- Down South; or, a Militia Training (c. 1830)
- Victorian; or, The Lion and the Kiss (1839)
- Tourists in America (1840)
- Oregon; or, The Disputed Territory (1846)
- Family Ties; or, The Will of Uncle Josh (1846)
