= Kate Field =

American journalist (1838–1896)

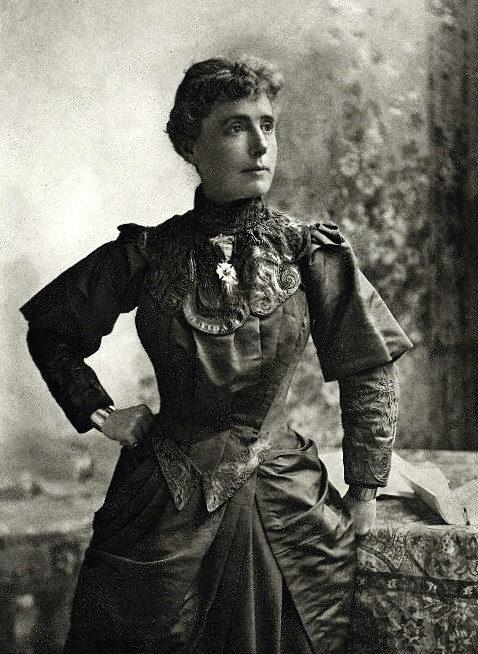
- Born: Mary Katherine Keemle Field; October 1, 1838; St Louis, Missouri, US
- Died: May 19, 1896 (aged 57); Honolulu
- Other names: Straws, Jr.
- Occupations: journalist; correspondent; editor; lecturer; actress
- Parents: Joseph M. Field; Eliza Riddle

Mary Katherine Keemle Field (pen name, Straws, Jr.; October 1, 1838 – May 19, 1896) was an American journalist, correspondent, editor, lecturer, and actress, of eccentric talent. She never married. Field seemed ready to give an opinion on any subject. She took public stances on controversial topics: opposing the Statue of Liberty as a poor use for an island, opposing the prohibition of alcohol (temperance), supporting the wine industry, for female clothing reform, opposing the immigration of "scum". She believed the U.S. was the best country in the world, and its people the most civilized.

Field was a unique figure in the history of American journalism. She began writing when still in her teens, and her letters to the Springfield Republican of Massachusetts, and other papers, over the signature of "Straws, Jr.," were well received. She wrote from Washington, D.C., New York City, and Europe. She was one of the few successful paragraphists, and her criticisms of art, music, and the drama, were just. She was both editor and publisher of her newsmagazine, Kate Field's Washington.

== Early years and education ==
Mary Katherine Keemle Field, known to her friends and family as Kate, was born October 1, 1838, in St. Louis, Missouri, the daughter of actors Joseph M. Field and Eliza Riddle. In 1839, the family moved to New Orleans, where Field's father worked for the New Orleans Picayune and a local theater company. The family returned to St. Louis by 1852, where her father opened a theater company, before moving to Mobile, Alabama.

Field was a precocious child who showed an early interest in literature. She published her first poem, "A Child's Muse", at nine years old in her father's newspaper in St. Louis. In the fall of 1855, she was sent to live with wealthy relatives in Cordaville, Massachusetts, while she attended Lasell Female Seminary (now Lasell College). At age 16, she was sent to Europe to travel as a form of education. She spent time in Florence, Italy, studying voice, and there she also began writing for American newspapers. A story circulated that she was abducted while in Sicily by brigands who demanded a substantial ransom. After six weeks, her family paid the requested amount, but not before the leader of the gang had fallen in love with her and proposed. Though she turned down the engagement, her positive influence allegedly inspired him to move to a monastery.

== Career ==
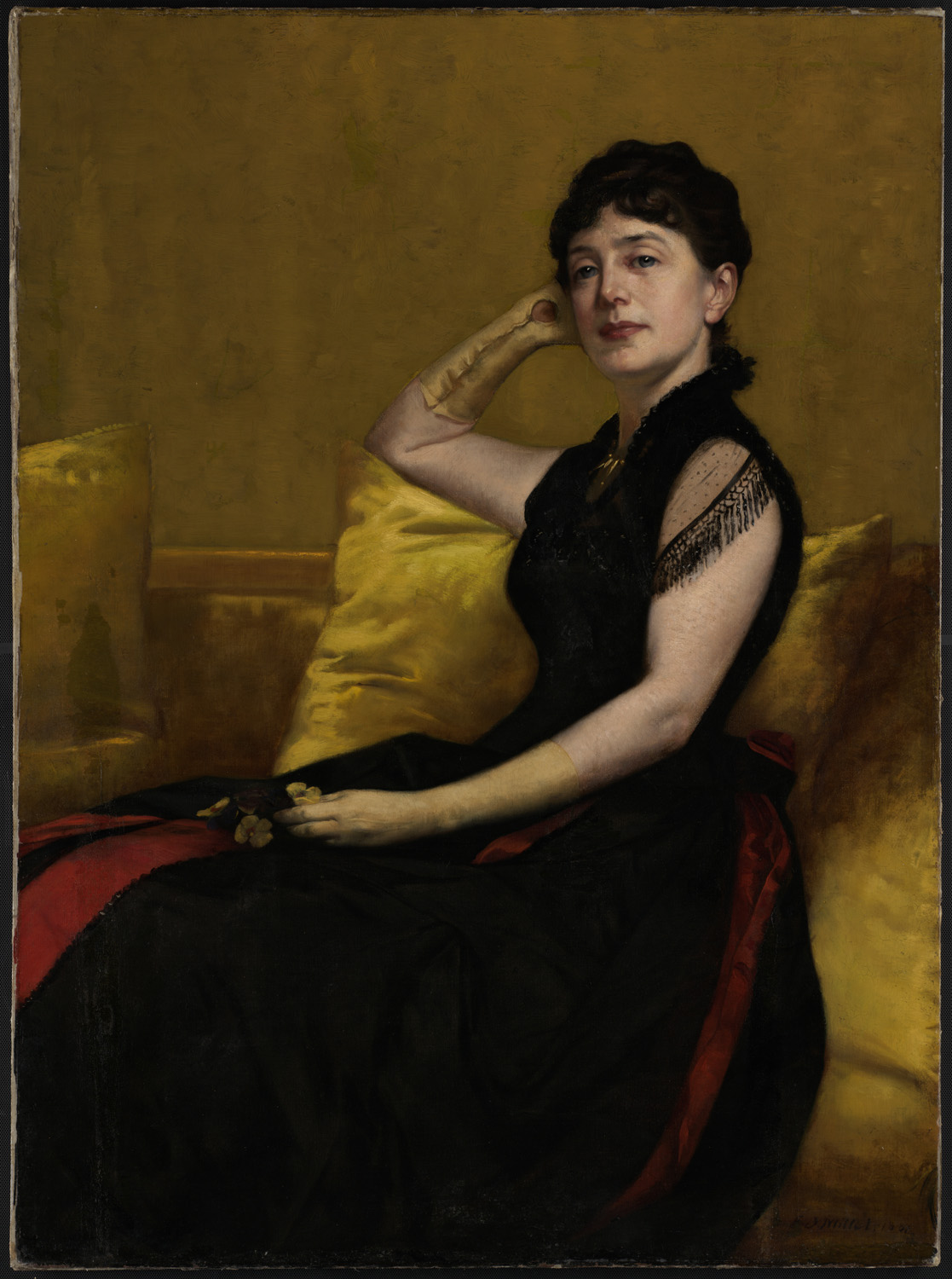
Field painted by Francis Davis Millet, 1888

In 1871, Field embarked on a lecture tour throughout New England and upstate New York. In Buffalo, New York, she met Mark Twain, a fellow lecturer and journalist, who spoke and wrote negatively about her. She continued lecturing into the Midwestern states, mostly stopping in small towns and rural areas. Six months later, she complained, "I never wish to repeat my lecture experiences in America. I loathe the life and the majority of the country audiences. I did it for money."

In 1873, at the peak of her career, she was said to be a more prominent journalist than Twain.

In 1874, Field appeared as Peg Woffington at Booth's Theatre, New York City. She afterward abandoned the regular comedy for dance, song, and recitation, but achieved no striking success. In 1882-83 she headed a Coöperative Dress Association in New York, which achieved a conspicuous failure. In 1889 she established Kate Field's Washington, a weekly journal published in Washington, D.C. After 1868, she published numerous volumes of miscellaneous contents, no longer noteworthy though, during her career, her comments were noted internationally.

Field never married. In October 1860, while visiting his mother's home in Florence, she met the celebrated British novelist Anthony Trollope. She became one of his closest friends and was the subject of Trollope's high esteem, as noted in his "Autobiography": "There is an American woman, of whom not to speak in a work purporting to [be] a memoir of my own life would be to omit all allusion to one of the chief pleasures which has graced my later years." Trollope scholars have speculated on the nature of their warm friendship. Twenty-four of his letters to Field survive and are now housed at the Boston Public Library; hers to Trollope do not.

Field died of pneumonia in 1896 in the Republic of Hawaiʻi, which at the time was a foreign country. She described herself as a "cremationist", calling cremation "not only the healthiest and cleanest, but the most poetical way of disposing of the dead. Whoever prefers loathsome worms to ashes, possesses a strange imagination." Her body was in fact cremated, the ashes buried next to those of her parents and brother, at Mount Auburn Cemetery in Cambridge, Massachusetts.

== John Brown ==
Inspired by Thoreau, Field spent a month camping in the Adirondacks in 1869. She turned her experiences into a lecture, "Out in the Woods" or "Among the Adirondacks," which she delivered dozens of times between 1869 and 1871 (published in 1870 as "In and Out of the Woods").

She ended the lecture with a description of finding, in remote North Elba, New York, the farm that had been abolitionist John Brown's, and a plea for its preservation. In 1870, after a fundraising campaign, she purchased the farm; as a direct result of her efforts the farm is now the John Brown Farm State Historic Site. She also attempted to purchase the nearby summit of Mount Marcy in 1870, but its owners refused a deal. In addition, she was responsible for the rescue of John Brown's Fort, abandoned in Chicago after the 1893 Colombian Exposition, and got it moved back to Harpers Ferry, West Virginia.

She worked toward creation of forest parks both in the Adirondacks and Yosemite.
