= A Gold Mine =

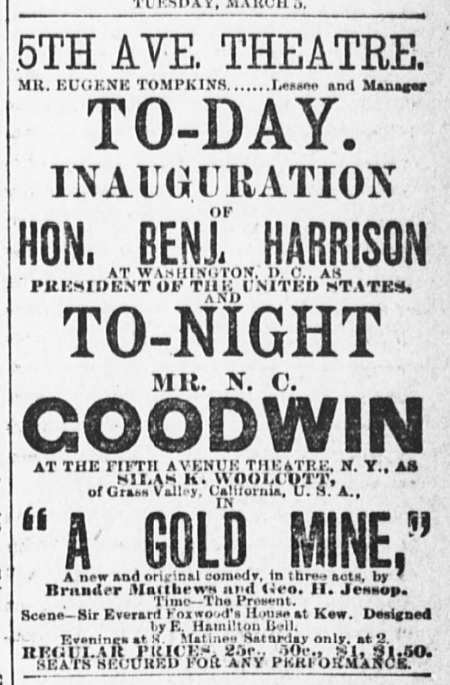
- Advertisement in March 4, 1889 issue of The Evening World
- Written by: Brander Matthews and George H. Jessop
- Genre: Comedy

Premiere
- Date premiered: 4 March 1889 (Broadway); Had at least one non-New York performance previously in April 1887
- Place premiered: Fifth Avenue Theatre

A Gold Mine is an 1887 play by Brander Matthews and George H. Jessop. It is best known for elevating the career of Nat Goodwin with its 1889 debut on Broadway, and for being referenced in Theodore Dreiser's 1900 novel Sister Carrie.

== Background ==
The play originated when Jessop approached Matthews with an idea for a comedic play for actor John T. Raymond, who was known for roles including that of playing Asa Trenchard in Our American Cousin. Based on that role, Matthews suggested they place the play in London, to re-use the plot device of the contrast of an American among the English.

The play debuted on April 1, 1887 in Memphis starring Raymond, but he only performed it once—he unexpectedly died a few days later. But actor Nat Goodwin, wanting to move out of burlesques and farces into more legitimate comic roles, decided to take it on. It had its Broadway debut on March 4, 1889 at the Fifth Avenue Theatre, with Goodwin now in the lead role of Silas Woolcott.

The original run went through April 27, 1889, but Goodwin continued to play the role on the road for several years, and the play was performed by stock and amateur troupes for years afterwards. The play marked Goodwin's to switch to legitimate theater which brought him fame.

Goodwin also brought the play to the West End, where it debuted at the Gaiety Theatre on July 21, 1890.

== Reception ==
The play is mentioned in Theodore Dreiser's 1900 novel Sister Carrie, seeming to spark Carrie's interest in theater. The reference is likely a slight to the quality of the play, which enjoyed popularity in its day but not critical acclaim. The Critic called it a "rather disappointing work on account of its inequalities and inconsistencies. If the whole of it were up to the level of its best scenes, it would be a genuine comedy of decided merit, but the authors, unfortunately, have descended at times to purely farcical expedients, and have sacrificed artistic propriety and probability for the sake of a little cheap laughter." One review of the London production stated "it seemed to be very far from being an average play. There is really no plot, the characters are extravagantly drawn, and most of the jokes are as old as the hills."

When Matthews died in 1929, the play was dutifully listed in obituaries as among his best known works, but without much other comment. One columnist noted, that Matthews' works "belonged to a past age"; and what would a reader of the day (1929) think of them--"the chances are he has never opened one of his books." The play has received little modern critical attention outside of the Dreiser reference.

== Plot ==
A brief summary of the play's plot written in 1900 is as follows: "The story of the play deals principally with the adventures of a big-hearted American, who, while visiting in England with a view to selling a gold mine, falls in love with a fair widow and is by her protected from the results of his generosity in selling his mine for half its value to pay the debts of a younger relative of the widow. The action passes in the house of a wealthy English gentleman of rank and the play has many amusing scenes and situations."

== Broadway cast ==
- Nat Goodwin as Silas Woolcott
- E.J. Buckley as Gerald Riordan, M.P.
- Robert G. Wilson as Sir Everard Foxwood, Knt.
- Harry Eversfield as George Foxwood
- John T. Craven as Julius Krebs
- Thomas H. Burns as Wilson
- Kate Forsyth as Hon. Mrs. Meredith
- Nanette Comstock as Miss Una Foxwood
- Ida Vernon as Mrs. Vandervast
