= Walter Burridge =

American painter

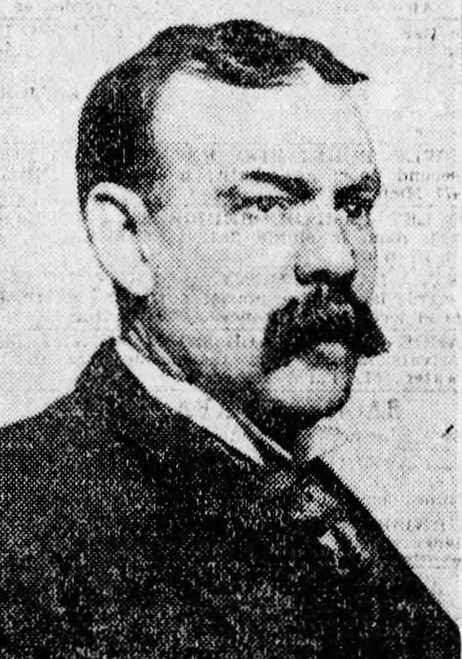
- Born: Walter Wilcox Burridge; 1857; Brooklyn, New York
- Died: June 25, 1913 (aged 56); Albuquerque, New Mexico
- Burial place: Forest Home Cemetery
- Occupation: Painter

Walter Wilcox Burridge (1857 – June 25, 1913) was a painter in the United States. He did theater set work and established his own studio. Burridge did work on a cyclorama of Kilauea at the Volcano House. He also did many scene paintings for theatrical productions. In his obituary, the Brooklyn Eagle called him one of the foremost scene painters of his time.

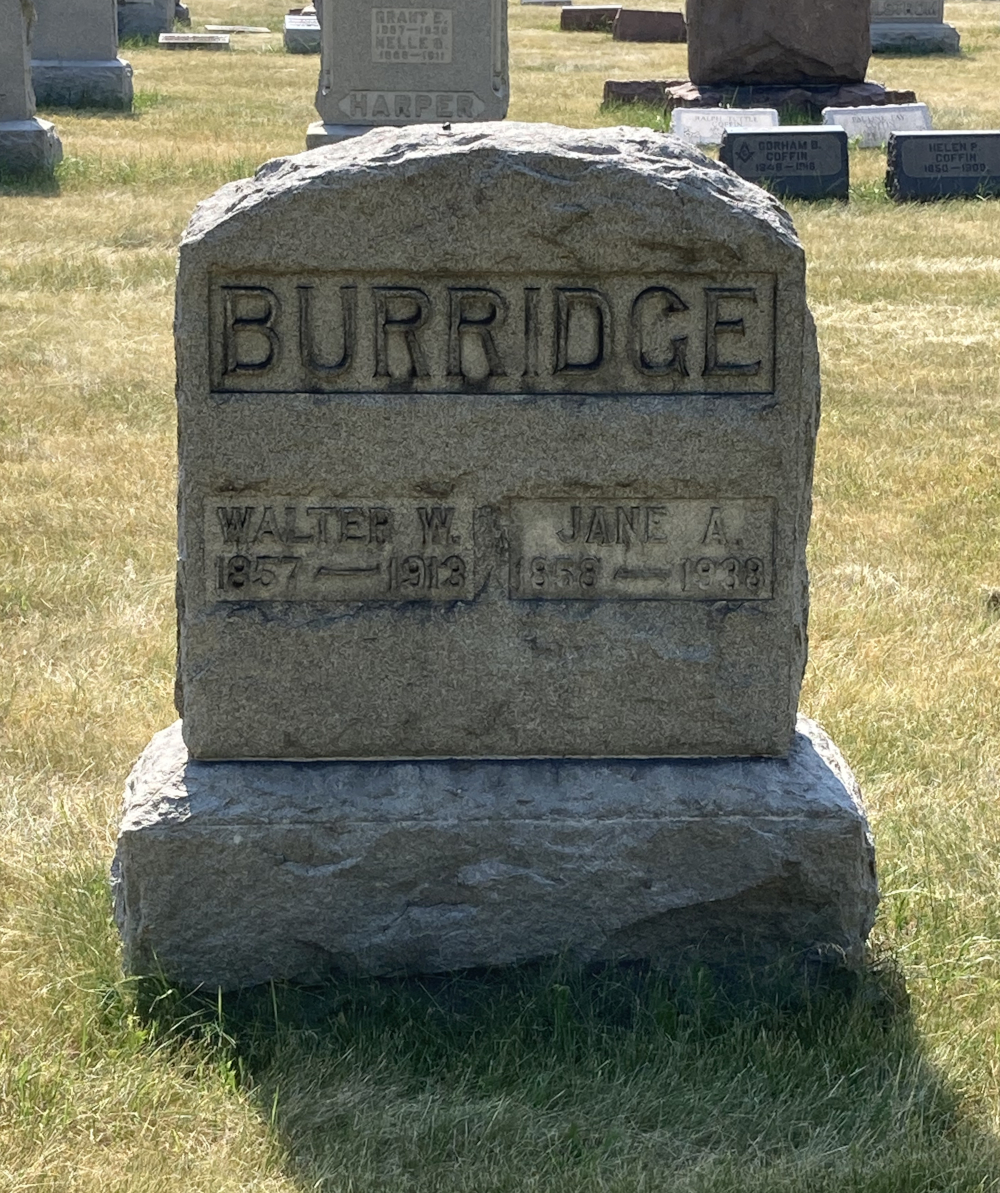
Burridge's grave at Forest Home Cemetery

Burridge painted the principal curtain at the McVickers Theater: Chicago in 1833. He was in Albuquerque, New Mexico to work on the Panama Exposition when he died of heart disease in 1913. He was buried at Forest Home Cemetery in Forest Park, Illinois.

Burridge was from Brooklyn and his father Henry was the proprietor of the Old Masons Arms Inn there.

== Work ==
- The Woman Haters (opened October 7, 1912) scenic design
- The Man from Cook's (opened March 25, 1912) scenic design
- The Three Romeos (opened November 13, 1911) scenic design
- Everywoman (opened February 27, 1911) scenic design
- The Merry Widow (opened October 21, 1907) scenic design
- The Prince of Pilsen (opened March 19, 1906) scenic design
- The County Chairman (opened September 1, 1904) scenic design
- A Country Girl (opened September 22, 1902) scenic design
- Arizona (opened September 10, 1900) scenic design
