= Dan Marble =

American actor (1810–1849)

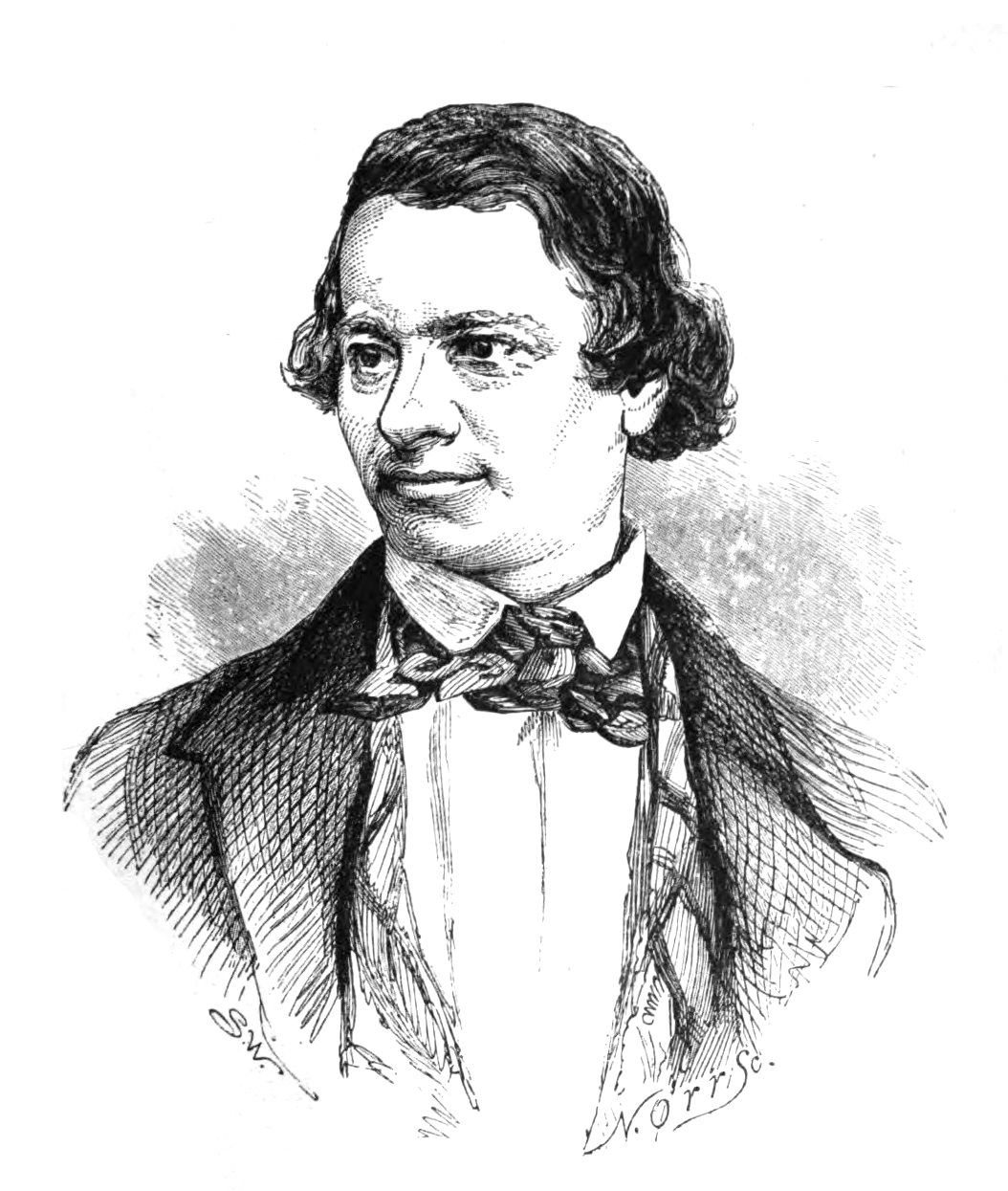
Dan Marble

Danforth Marble (April 27, 1810 – May 13, 1849) was an American comedic actor who gained great popularity playing "Yankee" roles in the 1830s and 1840s.

Marble was born in East Windsor, Connecticut and made his stage debut in 1831 at Chatham Garden Theatre in New York, playing the role of Rollin Roughhead in Fortune's Frolic by John Till Allingham.

Dan Marble was famous for his portrayal of the character "Sam Patch", the famous daredevil jumper. He developed the role starting in 1836, and first played Sam Patch at the Eighth Street Theatre in Buffalo, New York, where Patch's successful jump at nearby Niagara Falls in 1829 had made him a local legend. Marble went on to star in a number of "Sam Patch" plays throughout the United States. In his role as Sam Patch he would leap forty feet over a simulated Niagara Falls into a mock raging river. In 1845, he went to England, where he performed on the Strand as the classic Yankee 'Deuteronomy Dutiful'. He returned to America in 1845.

Marble died of cholera in Louisville, Kentucky on May 13, 1849. Humorist Jonathan Falconbridge Kelly wrote a biography of Marble which was published in 1851.

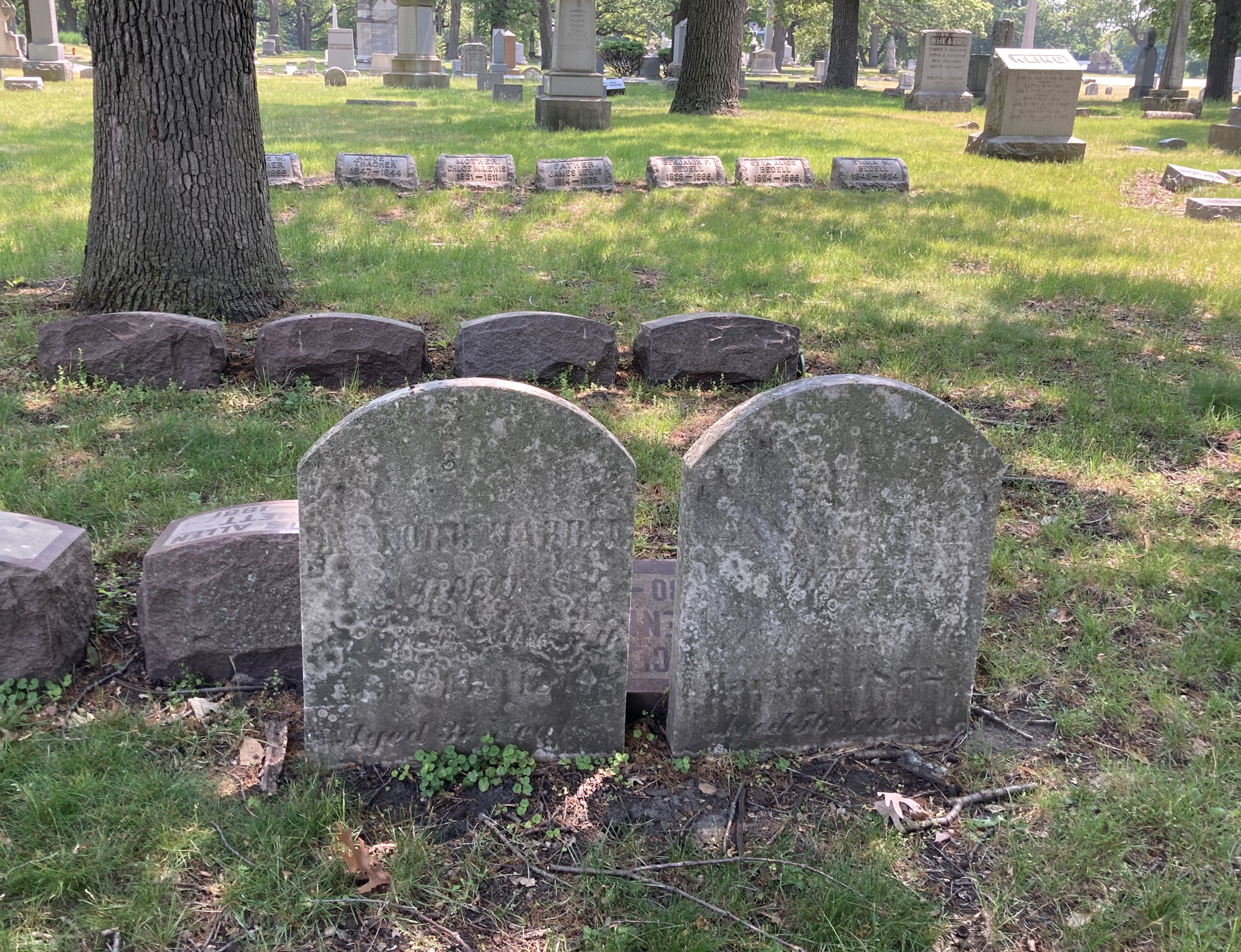
The Marbles' graves at Rosehill Cemetery

Marble married Anna Warren (1815–1872) of Philadelphia, an actress and daughter of actor William Warren (1767-1832), on November 13, 1836. Their son Edward Marble was an actor and songwriter. Their daughter, Mary Marble, married the actor Samuel Meyers in Chicago in 1855, and acted for many years at McVicker's Theater in that city.

Dan and Anna are buried at Rosehill Cemetery in Chicago.

== Selected performances ==
- Sam Patch the Yankee Jumper(1836, New York debut in 1837)
- Sam Patch at Home
- Sam Patch in France
- Sam Patch the Jumper (1844)
- Vermont Wool Dealer (1838) (play by Cornelius Ambrosius Logan) (Marble played the Yankee role of "Deuteronomy Dutiful")
- Yankee Land (1842) (play by Logan)
- The Game Cock of the Wilderness (1845) (by William Leman Rede)
- Family Ties (1846) (play by Joseph M. Field, debuted at the Park Theatre in New York on June 19, 1846)
- The Stage Struck Yankee (1849) (by O.E. Durivage)
