= Grand Opera House (St. Louis) =

Theatre in Missouri, United States

Coordinates: 38.6253°N 90.1907°W

The Grand Opera House was the name of two theatres located in St. Louis, Missouri on the same property on the south side of Market Street between Broadway and Sixth Streets. The first theatre, originally known as the Varieties Theatre, opened in 1852 and went by several different names, including the Grand Opera House, during its thirty-two year existence. After it was destroyed by fire in November 1884, a second theatre, known from its inauguration as the Grand Opera House, was built on the site of the first theatre and opened just 10 months after the destruction of the first theatre in September 1885. In 1935 the second Grand Opera House was renamed the Grand Theatre when it became part of a chain of a burlesque circuit of theaters. It operated under that name into the early 1960s. In 1963 the theatre was demolished to make room for Busch Memorial Stadium.

== Grand Opera House (1852–1884) ==
The first Grand Opera House opened as the Varieties Theatre (also known as Field's Varieties) in May 1852 under the management of Joseph M. Field. It was designed after the Salle Barthélemy; a theatre located on the Rue Neuve-Saint-Nicolas in Paris, France that had opened previously in June 1851. The inaugural performance at the Varieties Theatre occurred on May 10, 1852, with a double bill of Edward W. Shands' You Can't Open and the comedy Where There's a Will; the latter starring Field and his wife, the actress Eliza Riddle Field.

Field's tenure as manager lasted only one season, and his last performance as manager and actor at the Varieties Theatre occurred on June 13, 1852. The theatre remained closed until it was taken over by the St. Louis journalist Henry Boernstein who utilized the theatre for performances of the Philodramatic Society, a dramatic group specializing in German language theatre, from 1856 through 1859. When the theatre was purchased by James Buchanan Eads in 1858 the theatre was renamed the St. Louis Opera House (sometimes known by its German translation St. Louis Opernhaus). It continued to operate under that name until 1861 when it closed; only to re-open for periodical intervals between 1861 and 1864, once again operating under the name Varieties Theatre.

In 1868 the theatre re-opened under a new name, the Wakefield Theatre. In operated under this name until 1874 when it was sold to Benedict DeBar. It was then renamed the DeBar Opera House, only to be renamed the Grand Opera House three years later when Pierre Chouteau purchased the theatre after DeBar's death in 1877. It operated as the Grand Opera House for the next seven years under the management of John W. Norton. The theatre was destroyed by fire on November 23, 1884, during Norton's tenure.

== Grand Opera House (1885–1963) ==
The second Grand Opera House was built over a ten-month period on the same property as the first theatre. It opened on September 14, 1885, with a production headlined by Nat Goodwin. In 1898 the theatre was purchased by the Tri-State Amusement Company which operated a chain of theatres in the cities of Chicago, Pittsburgh, and St. Louis. In 1935 the theatre was renamed the Grand Theatre when it became part of a chain of a burlesque circuit of theaters. It operated under that name into the early 1960s, and was demolished in 1963 to make room for Busch Memorial Stadium.

== Bibliography ==
- Mary Bagley (1984). "Grand Opera House". The Front Row: Missouri's Grand Theatres.
- Adrien Jean Quentin Beuchot, ed. (1851). Bibliographie de la France. Vol. 40. Au Cercle de la Librairie.
- Dennis Michael Maher (1980). The Theatre in St. Louis, 1875-1900, Volume 1. University of Wisconsin–Madison Press.
- John Thomas Scharf (1883). "Grand Opera House". History of Saint Louis City and County: From the Earliest Periods to the Present Day: Including Biographical Sketches of Representative Men, Volume 1.
- Howard Louis Conard, ed. (1901). "Encyclopedia of the History of Missouri: A Compendium of History and Biography for Ready Reference, Volume 5". Southern History Company.
- Ernst D. Kargau (2000). Don Heinrich Tolzmann (ed.). The German Element in St. Louis: A Translation from German of Ernst D. Kargau's St. Louis in Former Years : a Commemorative History of the German Element. Clearfield Company. ISBN 9780806349503.
