= John T. Raymond =

American stage actor

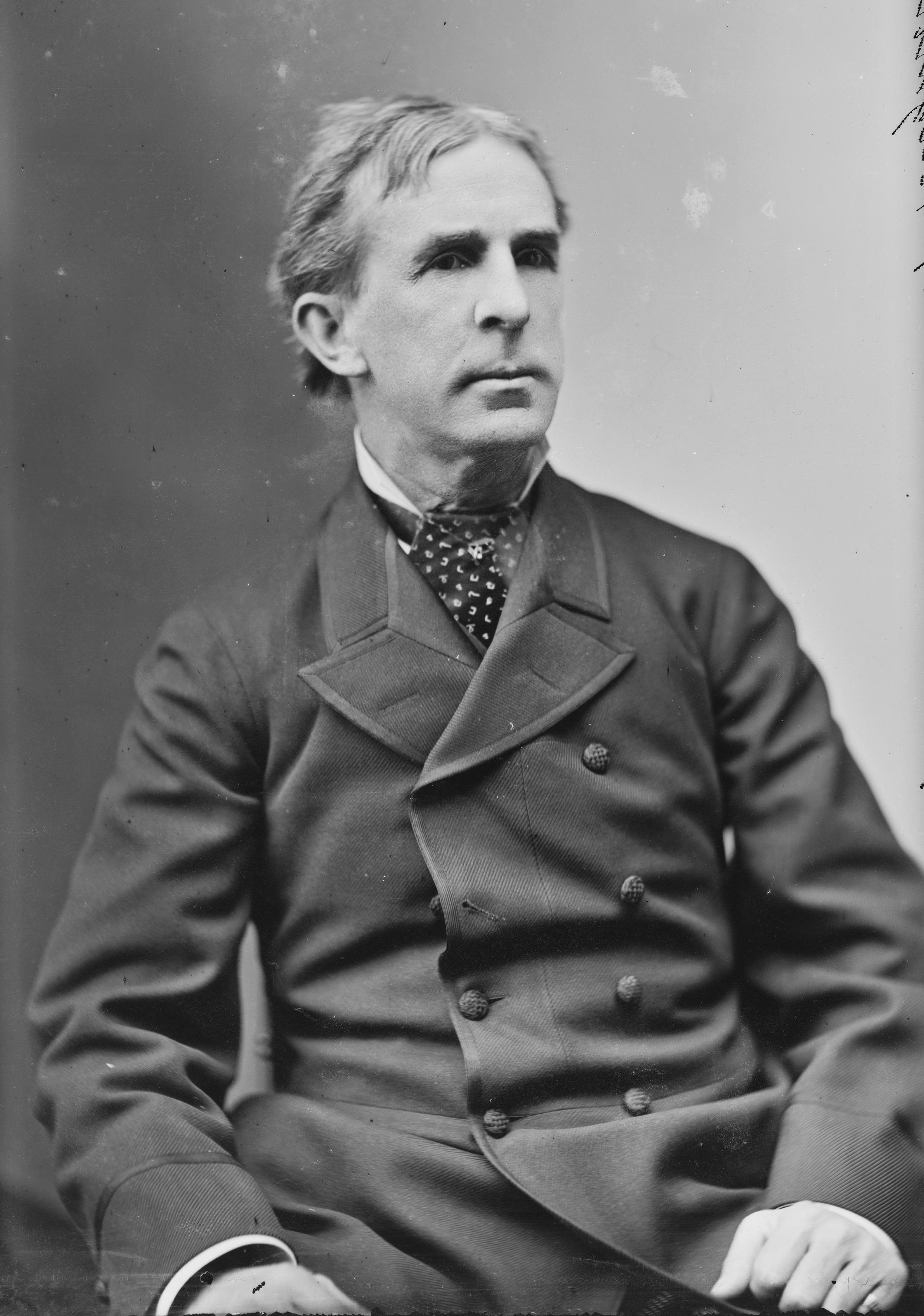
- Born: John O'Brien; August 5, 1836; Buffalo, New York, U.S.A.
- Died: April 10, 1887 (aged 50); Evansville, Indiana, U.S.A.
- Resting place: Brooklyn, New York, U.S.A.
- Occupation: Actor
- Known for: Col Mulberry Sellers

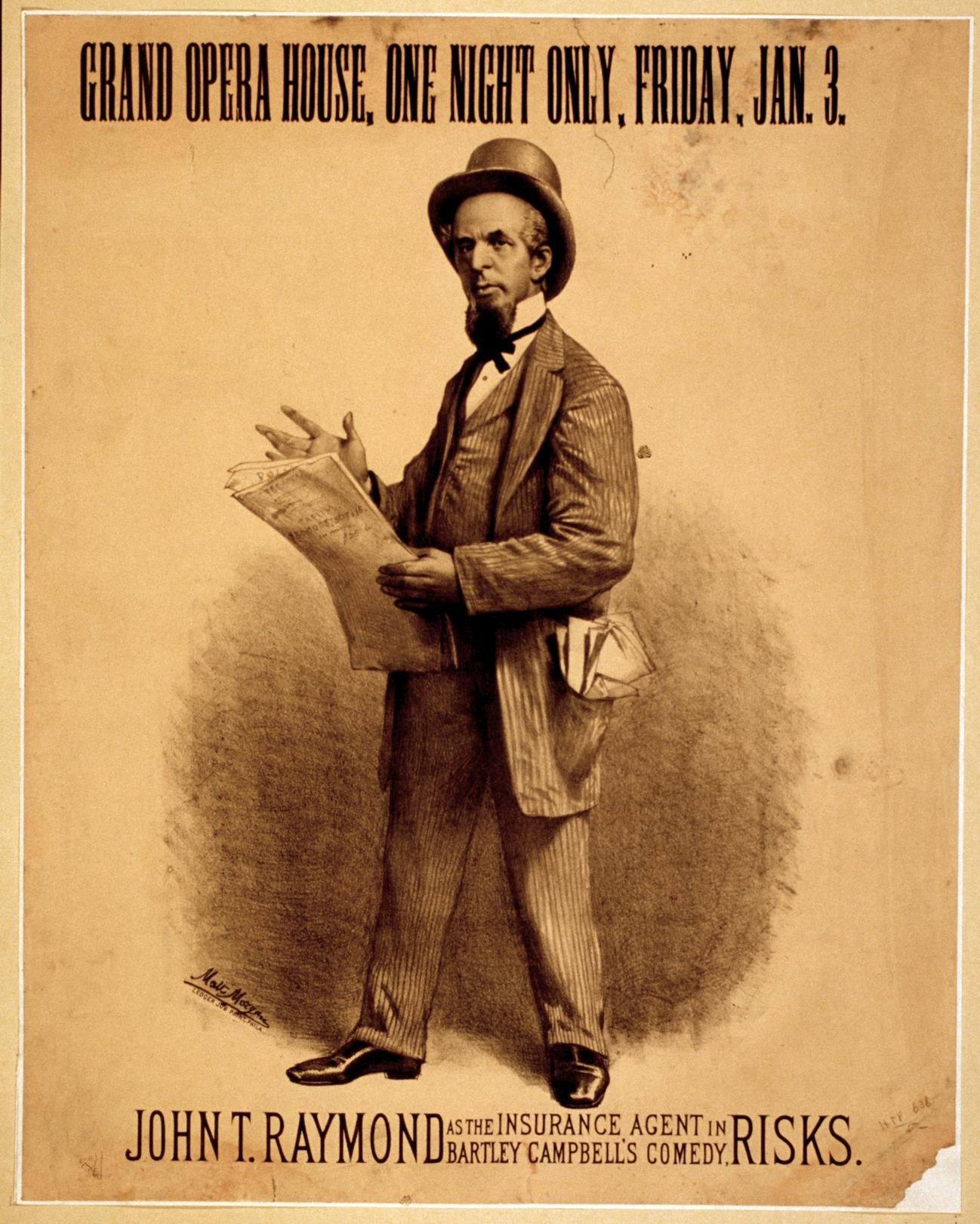
John T. Raymond in Risks

John T. Raymond (1836–1887), whose original name was John O'Brien, was an American stage actor, born in Buffalo, New York, on August 5, 1836; he died in Evansville, Indiana on April 10, 1887. His first appearance was made on June 27, 1853, at a theatre in Rochester, New York, under the management of Messrs., Carr and Henry Warren, as Lopez, in "The Honeymoon." Afterwards, he went to Philadelphia, Baltimore, Charleston, Savannah, Mobile and New Orleans. In 1858 he had his early success with Sothern in Tom Taylor's Our American Cousin, in which he later appeared in London and in Paris. Raymond first became known in New York in 1861, when he appeared at Laura Keene's Theatre, succeeding Joseph Jefferson in low comedy parts, and at that time he acted Asa Trenchard in "Our American Cousin." Raymond enjoyed a successful career at San Francisco's California Theater as low comedian, appearing many times in starring roles at Piper's Opera House. His greatest popular hit was as Col. Mulberry Sellers in a dramatization of Mark Twain's Gilded Age' (1873), a character that became completely identified with his own breezy optimism. Raymond's professional career extended over a period of thirty-two years, in the course of which he acted in all the parts that usually fall to the lot of a low comedian.

Raymond was twice married, first to actress Marie E. Gordon, known on the stage after 1864. Their marriage was unhappy and they were legally separated. His second wife was a daughter of Rose Eytinge. At the time of his second marriage he obtained legal authority for the change of his name from John O'Brien to John T. Raymond. In 1887 his body was brought to New York, and buried in the Actors' Plot, in Evergreen Cemetery, Long Island. His grave is marked by a stone bearing an inscription and an epitaph written by William Winter.

== Publications ==
- Matthews and Hutton, Actors and Actresses of Great Britain and the United States (New York, 1886)
- McKay and Wingate, Famous American Actors of To-Day (New York, 1896)
