= The Players (New York City) =

- U.S. National Register of Historic Places
- U.S. National Historic Landmark
- U.S. Historic district – Contributing property
- New York State Register of Historic Places
- New York City Landmark
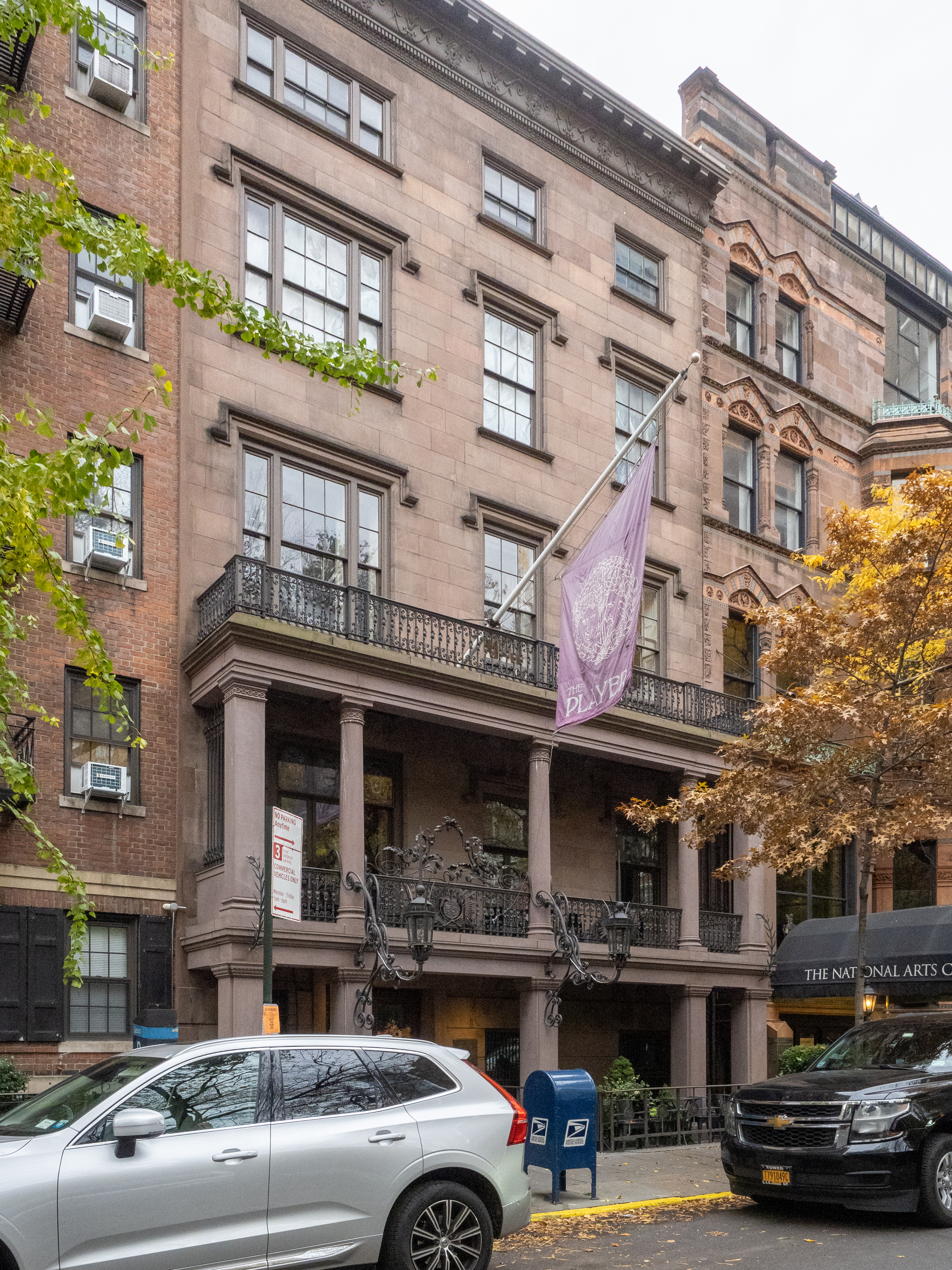

- Location within New York City Location within New York Location within the United States
- Location: 16 Gramercy Park South, Manhattan, New York City
- Coordinates: 40°44′15.7″N 73°59′11.8″W
- Built: 1844; 182 years ago
- Architect: Stanford White (1888 renovations)
- Architectural style: Renaissance
- Part of: Gramercy Park Historic District (ID80002691)
- NRHP reference No.: 66000549
- NYSRHP No.: 06101.000101
- NYCL No.: 0222

Significant dates
- Added to NRHP: October 15, 1966
- Designated NHL: December 29, 1962
- Designated NYSRHP: June 23, 1980
- Designated NYCL: March 15, 1966

The Players (often inaccurately called The Players Club) is a private social club founded in New York City by the 19th-century Shakespearean actor Edwin Booth. The club is located in a mansion at 16 Gramercy Park South, built in 1847. Booth bought the house in 1888, reserved an upper floor for his residence, and turned the rest into a clubhouse. The building's interior and part of its exterior were designed by architect Stanford White; its entryway gaslights are among the few remaining examples in New York City. It is reportedly the oldest club in its original clubhouse and was named a National Historic Landmark in 1962. It is next to the Samuel J. Tilden House, also a National Historic Landmark.

In addition to functioning as a social club, the Players is a repository of American and British theater history, memorabilia, and theatrical artifacts. It reportedly has the largest private collection of stage memorabilia, including costumes and weaponry, and owns portraits of its members, most notably a portrait of actor Joseph Jefferson painted by John Singer Sargent. A portrait of John Wilkes Booth, the assassin of Abraham Lincoln, hangs in Edwin Booth's suite, along with the letter Edwin wrote to the public apologizing for the actions of his brother.

Today, the club still holds "Pipe Nights" honoring theatrical notables, and maintains a kitchen and wine cellar and a billiard table in its usually busy Grill Room. In the Dining Room, filled with portraits of theater and film notables and rare playbills from the 19th and 20th centuries, a small stage has been built where members and people of the theater can be honored; staged readings can take place and new works tried out. The Players also gives the "Edwin Booth Life Achievement Award" to actors who have had a long, important body of theater and film work. Past recipients include Helen Hayes, José Ferrer, Garson Kanin, Christopher Plummer, Jason Robards, Jack Lemmon, Marian Seldes, Angela Lansbury, and Edward Albee.

== History ==
=== Founding ===
In 1888, Edwin purchased the former residence of Valentine G. Hall in Gramercy Square and, perhaps inspired by London's Garrick Club, established a social club to bring actors into contact with men of different professions such as industrialists, writers, and other creative artists.

Booth had the building redesigned, furnished, equipped, and decorated with his personal possessions. In its title, he stipulated that the building be equipped with a furnished apartment for his own undisturbed use. When completed, a series of meetings was held, and a small group of founding fathers turned the clubhouse over to newly invited members in a grand ceremony on December 31, 1888.

Booth died at the club on June 7, 1893, at the age of 59.

=== 20th century ===
Beginning in the 1970s, widows of club members were afforded limited privileges to the club. In September 1987, the club voted to allow women to be full members, a change that allowed the Players to rent its facilities for outside functions, which it had not been allowed to do before under New York City law. Helen Hayes was admitted as the first woman member on April 23, 1989, the birthday of William Shakespeare.

=== 21st century ===
In 2000, the New York State Attorney General's Office launched an investigation into The Players' financial dealings with the Hampden-Booth Theater Library, which occupies about a third of the club's building, and the John Drew Fund, a charity which has its offices in the building. The allegations were that the club may have overcharged the library for building upkeep, and kept more than its appropriate share of the sale of a collection of books in 1984, using the money to help pay for a major renovation to the building. The club also borrowed money from the John Drew Fund to pay for the renovation, a loan which had not yet been paid back. The boards of the club, the library, and the fund have overlapping members, a circumstance which may have contributed to the financial irregularities. The dispute between the library and the club was settled, with neither owing the other any money; the settlement also satisfied part of the state's investigation. One of the terms of the settlement was that the club would sell its John Singer Sargent portrait of Edwin Booth to raise money.

On June 19, 2013, Johnnie Planco was re-elected as president. Planco informed members at that time that the club was about $4 million in debt, and raised the possibility that their clubhouse might have to be sold; some estimates put the value of the property at more than $14 million. In addition, it has been reported that according to the New York City Department of Finance a lien has been placed against the club due to $250,000 in back taxes owed, in addition to other debts. The tax debt has been sold to a third party.

Options under consideration to ameliorate the club's financial problems include, it has been reported, renting the club's rooms for parties and meetings, providing the building to be used as an interior location for film shoots, and selling naming rights to the rooms. Creative partnerships with Actors' Equity the Screen Actors Guild and the Directors Guild are also being pursued. In October 2013, the effort to restore the deteriorating facade of the club's historic building was initiated, with the formation of a not-for-profit 501c3 organization, "The Players, 16 Gramercy Park South Preservation Fund, Inc."

The rooms of the club are used for performances of plays, literary readings, workshops, concerts, and more. In December 2015, the club hosted the official 30th Anniversary Celebration of the film Clue, honoring the film's screenwriter and director Jonathan Lynn with a live reenactment performance on the clubhouse stage featuring actors Zachary Levi, Michael Urie, Sara Chase, Lauren Adams, and Brandon Uranowitz, among others.

In 2016, the Players obtained a $8.5 million loan from Terrapin Lending Company to help it straighten out its financial problems without having to sell its prized artwork, including a Sargent portrait of actor Joseph Jefferson, which they loaned for a time to the Metropolitan Museum of Art. The club plans to focus on its members, including bringing in new ones, and hold fewer ticketed events aimed at the general public, according to Michael Barra, the chair of the club's managing committee and executive committee of the Board of Directors.

== Membership ==
Members of the Players included the local pillars of society of the day, prominent bankers, lawyers and businessmen, as well as those identified with other arts — writers, journalists, sculptors, architects and painters.

Founding members included Mark Twain, William Tecumseh Sherman, Lawrence Barrett, Laurence Hutton, Augustin Daly, A. M. Palmer, Joseph F. Daly, William Bispham, Brander Matthews, James Lewis, Stephen H. Olin, Henry Edwards, and John A. Lane.

Presidents of the club have included Joseph Jefferson, who succeeded Booth as president after his death, as well as John Drew Jr., Walter Hampden, Howard Lindsay, Dennis King, Alfred Drake, Roland Winters, José Ferrer, Robert Lansing, John Bartholomew Tucker (pro tem), Michael Allinson and Lynn Redgrave. President Timothy Hutton resigned on June 5, 2008, because work was keeping him on the West Coast. New York producer and longtime member Herb Blodgett took his place, and in June 2010, it was announced that theatrical manager Johnnie Planco would replace him.

The longtime syndicated columnist Earl Wilson said in 1964: "Long ago a New Yorker asked the difference between the Lambs, Friars, and Players, since the membership was, at the time, predominantly from Broadway. ... [A] wit believed to have been George S. Kaufman [drew the distinction:] The Players are gentlemen trying to be actors, the Lambs are actors trying to be gentlemen, and the Friars are neither trying to be both."
