= Jonathan Falconbridge Kelly =

American journalist & humorist (1817–c.1855)

Jonathan Falconbridge Kelley (August 14, 1817 - July 21, 1855?) was an American journalist and humorist. He published under a number of pseudonyms, including "Falconbridge", "Jack Humphries", "O.K.", "Cerro Gordo", and "J.F.K."

Kelley was born in Philadelphia in 1817, and later moved west. He started to publish humorous pieces as "Falconbridge" in Spirit of the Times newspaper, and which proved to be popular, in 1844. A posthumous collection of his work containing 111 of his sketches, The Humors of Falconbridge, was published in November 1856. He also wrote a biography of comedic actor Dan Marble in 1851, and briefly published a comedic journal in Boston called The Aurora Borealis. He also had brief attachments to a number of other newspapers. His body of work is largely forgotten today.

Kelley died perhaps of cholera in Cincinnati in 1855 and buried at Spring Grove Cemetery.
