= Mavourneen (musical) =

Comedy-drama musical

Mavourneen was billed as a comedy-drama by George H. Jessop and Horace Townsend with music and lyrics by William J. Scanlan (who appeared in the show) and Bartley Campbell.

It was produced in New York on September 28, 1891 at the Fourteenth Street Theatre, and ran until December 25, 1891.

== Cast ==
The cast included:

- Terrence Dwyer: William J. Scanlan
- John Dwyer: Frank Burbeck
- Captain Marchmont: Frazer Coulter
- Abbe Maloney: Charles M. Collins
- Shamus Corrigan: Thaddeus Shine
- Lady Caroline Dwyer: Helen Tracy
- Lady May Tyrrell: Nanette Comstock
- Mrs. Dwyer: Emma Maddern Stevens
- Georgie Dwyer: Dot Clarendon
- Mark: John Findlay
- Colonel: Frank Peters
- Cusack: J.O. Le Brasse
- Kate Morris: Grace Thorne
- Susie Morris: Ray Maskell
- Katy Morris: Dot Clarendon

== Songs ==
Based on published sheet music and advertisements in the New York Times, the songs included:

- The Auld Country
- Bye Bye Baby Bye Bye
- The Christmas Tree
- Mavourneen
- Molly O!
- Mrs. Reilly's Party
- Story of the Ould Countre
