= Isaac N. Comstock =

American politician (1808–1883)

New York State Prison Inspector
- In office January 1, 1848 – December 31, 1849

Personal details
- Born: Isaac Newton Comstock; January 25, 1808 Saratoga County, New York, U.S.
- Died: March 24, 1883 (aged 75)
- Party: Whig
- Spouse: Elizabeth Hussey (died 1842)
- Relatives: Nanette Comstock (niece)
- Occupation: Politician

Military service
- Allegiance: United States
- Branch/service: United States Army (Union army)
- Rank: Major

Isaac Newton Comstock (January 25, 1808 in Saratoga County, New York – March 24, 1883) was an American politician from New York.

== Life ==
He lived at Albany, New York, and was married to Elizabeth (or Betsey) Hussey (d. 1842).

He was one of the first three Inspectors of State Prisons elected on the Whig ticket in 1847 under the New York State Constitution of 1846, and drew the two-year term, being in office from 1848 to 1849. Afterwards he became Agent (financial officer), and also Warden of Clinton State Prison.

In March 1864, he entered the Commissary department of the Union Army with the rank of captain. On July 10, 1865, he was brevetted major of volunteers, and honorably mustered out on the next day.

Stage actress Nanette Comstock (1866–1942) was his niece.
