= William J. Scanlan =

American composer and actor (1856-1898)

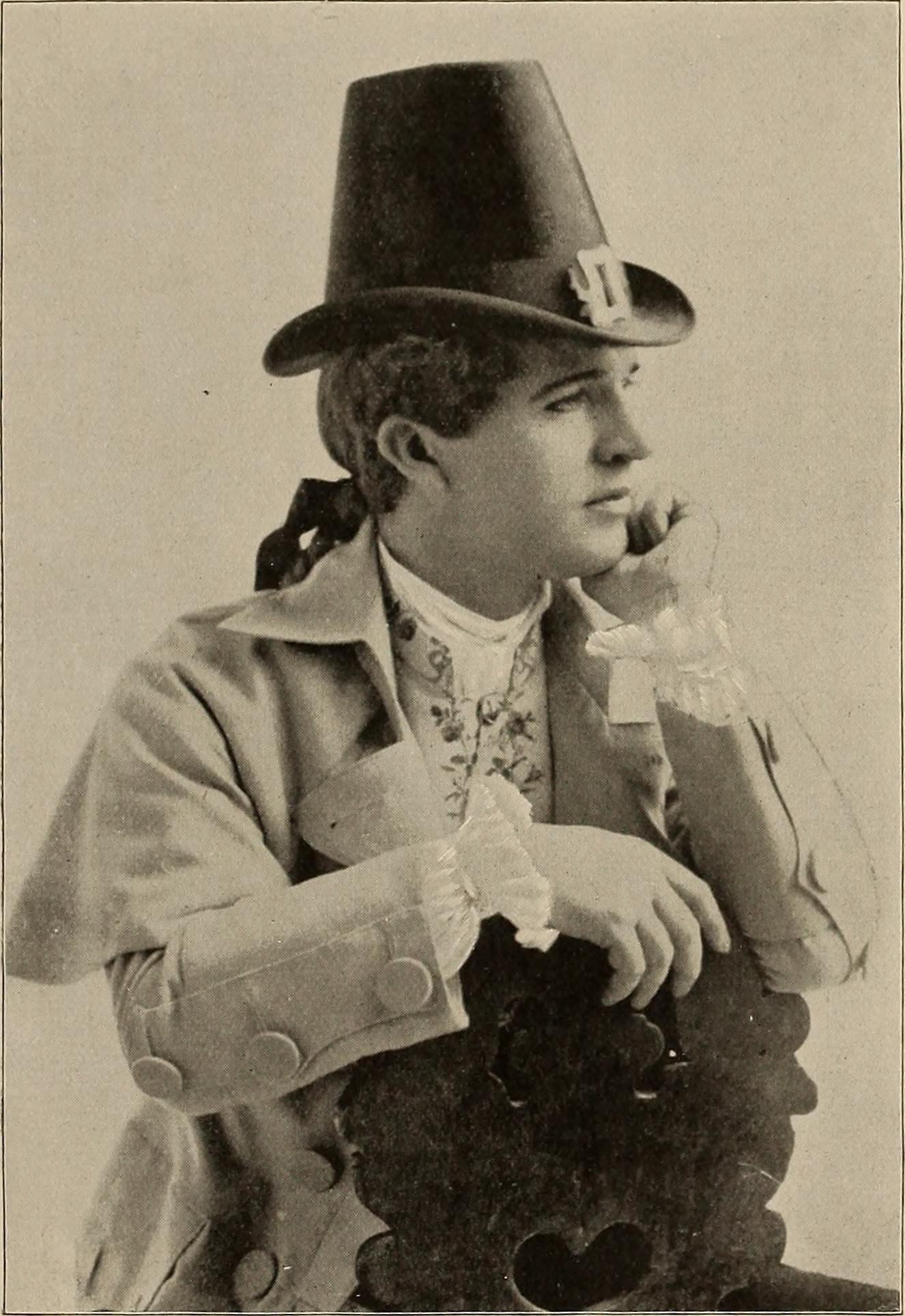
- W. J. Scanlan in 1892
- Born: February 14, 1856
- Died: February 18, 1898 (aged 42)
- Occupations: Composer, actor

William J. Scanlan (February 14, 1856 – February 18, 1898) was a composer and male actor of musical theater.

== Biography ==
William J. Scanlan was born to parents of Irish ancestry in Springfield, Massachusetts. After completing the 100th performance of his musical show Mavourneen on December 24, 1891, he became violently ill. He was taken to Bloomingdale Insane Asylum in White Plains, New York on January 7, 1892. He died there on February 18, 1898.
