= Laurence Hutton =

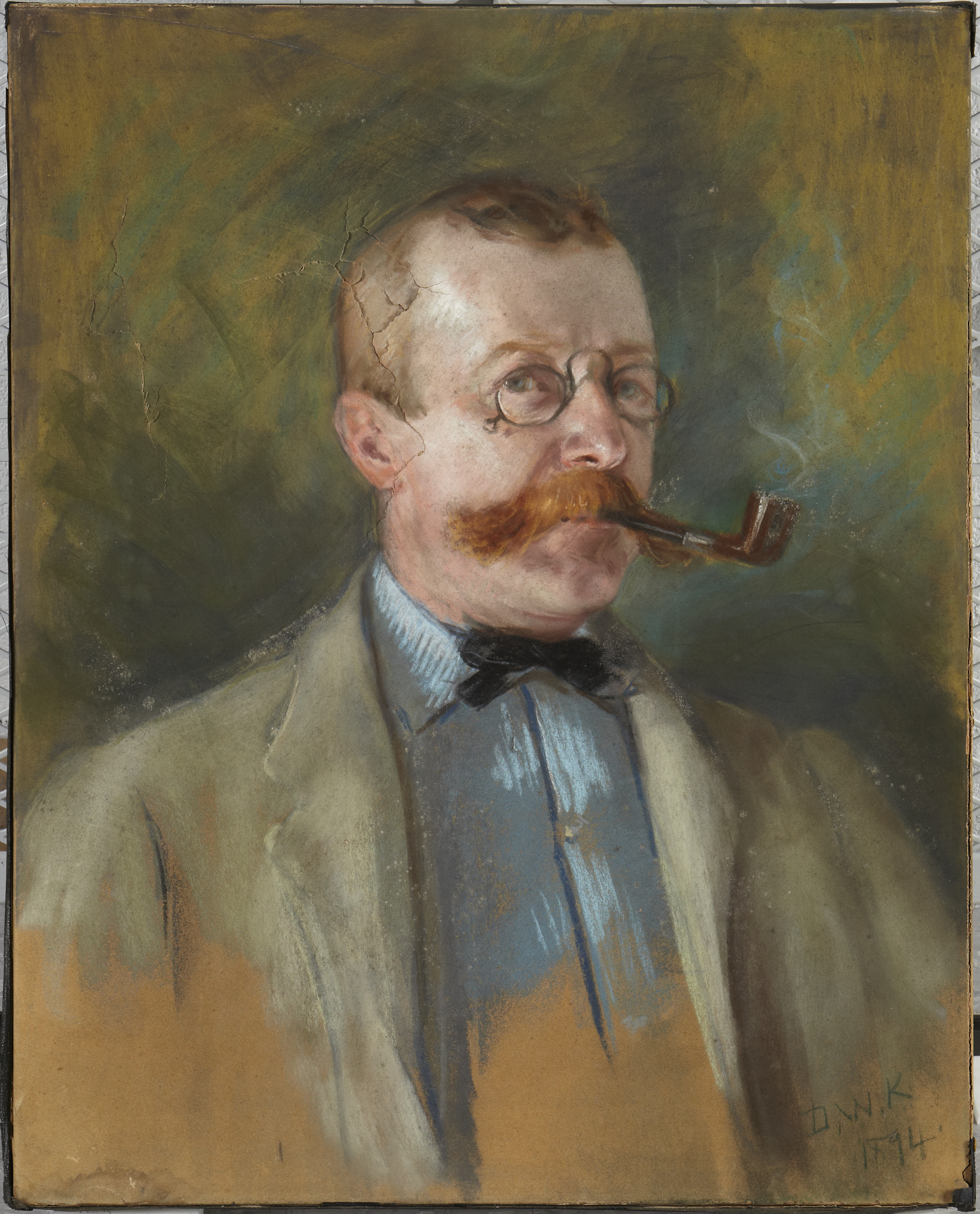
Dora Wheeler Keith, Laurence Hutton, 1894, Princeton University Art Museum

Laurence Hutton (August 8, 1843 – June 10, 1904) was an American essayist and critic.

== Biography ==
Hutton was born in New York City on August 8, 1843, and educated privately there. He was an inveterate traveler and for about 20 years spent his summers abroad. From about 1870 he contributed continually to periodicals. He was the dramatic critic of the New York Evening Mail from 1872 to 1874. From 1886 to 1898 he was the literary editor of Harper's Magazine. He was one of the organizers of the Authors' Club and of the International Copyright League, and was a founding member of The Players, and a member of the Princeton Club, and the Nassau Club. An ardent collector of literary curiosities, his collections are of remarkable interest. In 1892 he received the degree of A.M. from Yale University and an honorary Master of Art degree from Princeton University in 1897. From 1901 until his death in 1904, he was a lecturer of English at Princeton.

Hutton died of pneumonia in New York City in 1904. He left a collection of papers (Laurence Hutton Papers), 801 rare books, and a collection of death masks to the Princeton University Library. After his death, his friend Samuel Elliott donated $2,500 in his memory to endow the Laurence Hutton Prize, awarded annually to the top student in the Princeton University Department of History.

== Death mask collection ==
According to Princeton University, Hutton's collection of life and death masks contains about 100 masks and is the largest of its kind in the United States. Frank Weitenkampf quotes Hutton and the Epoch magazine on its genesis:

"I began the collection in rather a peculiar way. About 1864 or 5 I happened to be in the store of Fowler & Wells, when a boy brought in a death-mask of Cromwell. On being questioned, he said that he had found it in an ash-barrel somewhere near Second Avenue and Second Street, and that there were more there. I went there and found a large number, among them Washington (the Houdon cast), Franklin, Laurence Sterne (supposed to be authentic), Wordsworth and Walter Scott."... It appears that a certain professor, who had a hobby of collecting these death-masks, had just died, and his widow, who abhorred the ghastly images, got rid of them with all possible speed.

Princeton maintains an online repository of death-mask images from the collection: "Laurence Hutton Collection of Life and Death Mask, A Pictorial Guide by John Delaney".

== Works ==
His writings on dramatic subjects include:

- Plays and Players (1875)
- Curiosities of the American Stage (1891)
- Memoir of Edwin Booth (1893)
- with Brander Matthews, Actors and Actresses of Great Britain and of the United States (1886–87)
- A Boy I Knew (1899)

He edited the American Actor Series (1881–82) and published a group of delightful literary guidebooks, including:

- Literary Landmarks of London (1887)
- Edinburgh (1892)
- Jerusalem (1895)
- Venice (1896)
- Florence (1897)
- Rome (1897)
- Literary Landmarks of the Scottish Universities (1904)

Other works:

- Portraits in Plaster, from the Collection of Laurence Hutton, Harper & Brothers, New York (1894)
