= McVicker's Theater =

Theater in Chicago, Illinois (1857–1984)

Coordinates: 41.8818°N 87.6288°W

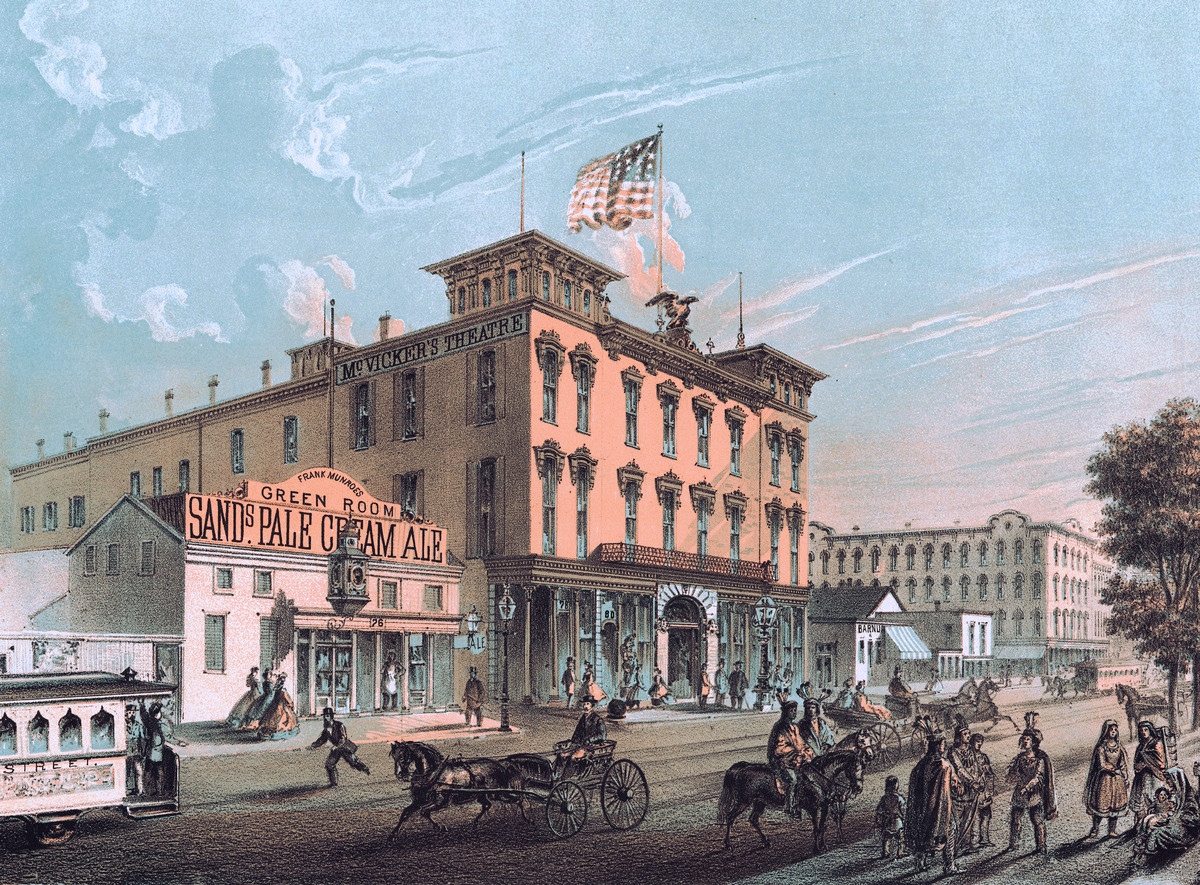
- MicVicker's Theater in 1866

General information
- Location: Chicago, Illinois, United States
- Opened: 1857
- Closed: 1984
- Demolished: 1985

McVicker's Theater (1857–1984) was a playhouse in Chicago, Illinois. Built for actor James Hubert McVicker, the theater was the leading stage for comedic plays in Chicago's early years. It often hosted performances by Edwin Booth, who married McVicker's daughter and was once targeted there in an attempted murder. Adler & Sullivan designed a remodel in 1883. Although destroyed in two fires, including the Great Chicago Fire, McVicker's remained an operating theater until 1984. It was demolished the next year.

== History ==
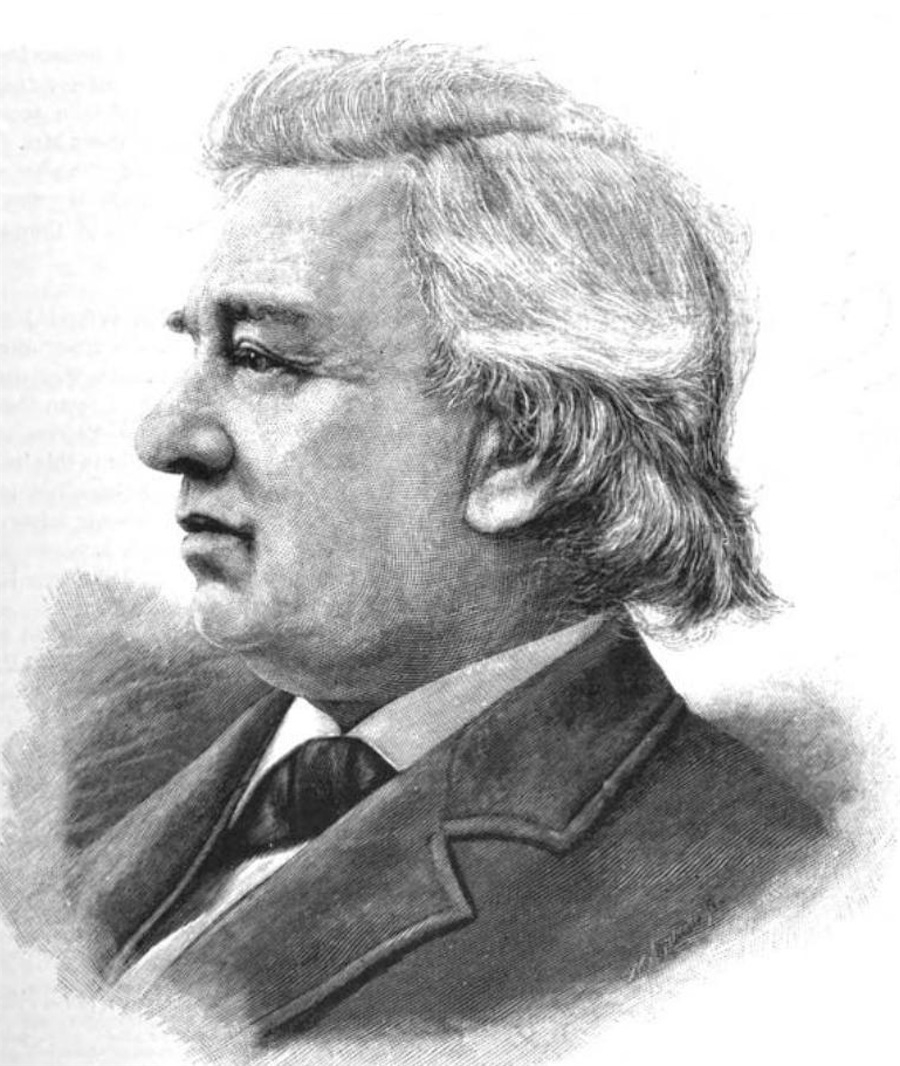
Founder James Hubert McVicker (1822–1896)

=== Background ===
James Hubert McVicker was born in New York City, New York, on February 14, 1822. His father James died shortly after his birth, so he was raised by his mother Nancy and two siblings. He attended some public school before apprenticing as a printer when he was ten. For the next five years, he operated machines in New York printing houses. In October 1837, he was hired as an apprentice for the Republican in St. Louis, Missouri, and was named a journeyman three years later. However he found little enjoyment in the trade and he decided to acquire a classic education.

In 1843, he entered a production at the St. Charles Theater in New Orleans, Louisiana. McVicker traveled to various cities around the country to perform. In April 1848, he settled in Chicago, Illinois. The comedian who had worked at John Blake Rice's theater was just about to leave and Rice offered his position to McVicker. His first performance there was on May 2, 1848, in My Neighbor's Wife. His wife also performed, starring in Hue and Cry. McVicker starred opposite Rice's wife in Lend Me Five Shillings on April 27, 1849.

Two years after the death of Dan Marble, McVicker purchased the right to use his plays from the family estate. He went on a national tour and then toured England in 1855.

=== Founding and early years (1857–1871) ===
In 1856, McVicker became manager of the People's Theater in St. Louis. The playhouse was very successful and in March 1857 he used the proceeds to establish the McVicker's Theater. The architects were Boyington & Wheelock and it cost $60,000 to build. The theater opened on November 5, 1857, featuring its own stock company performing the comedic plays Honeymoon and Rough Diamond.

Edwin Booth starred in A New Way to Pay Old Debts on May 31, 1858. He would later perform Richelieu, Richard III, and Brutus there, and he married one of McVicker's daughters in 1869. The theater was remodeled in 1864. James Henry Hackett performed as Falstaff in 1865. It was again extensively remodeled in August 1871, but was destroyed in the Great Chicago Fire weeks later.

=== Rebuilding and 19th-century prominence (1872–1896) ===
Floor plan of the rebuilt venue as it was laid out in the 1890s

The rebuilt McVicker's Theatre by Wheeler & Thomas reopened on August 15, 1872. Performers in McVicker's company over the years included James O'Neill, Rossini Vrionides and Robert B. Mantell. On April 23, 1879, Mark Gray fired two bullets in an unsuccessful attempt to murder Edwin Booth, while the actor was performing Richard II.

McVicker's was remodeled again in 1885 by Adler & Sullivan, but again destroyed in a fire in 1890. The rebuilt theater, designed by the same, opened on March 31, 1891, with a performance of The Rivals featuring Joseph Jefferson, William J. Florence, Louisa Lane Drew, and Viola Allen.

McVicker died on March 7, 1896. His widow assumed management until she sold the theater to Jacob Litt in 1898.

=== 20th century and decline (1898–1985) ===
The theatre was demolished and rebuilt in 1922. Balaban and Katz acquired the property in 1926 and converted it into a motion picture venue. It continued to operate as a cinema until its closure in 1984 and was demolished the following year.

== Decor ==
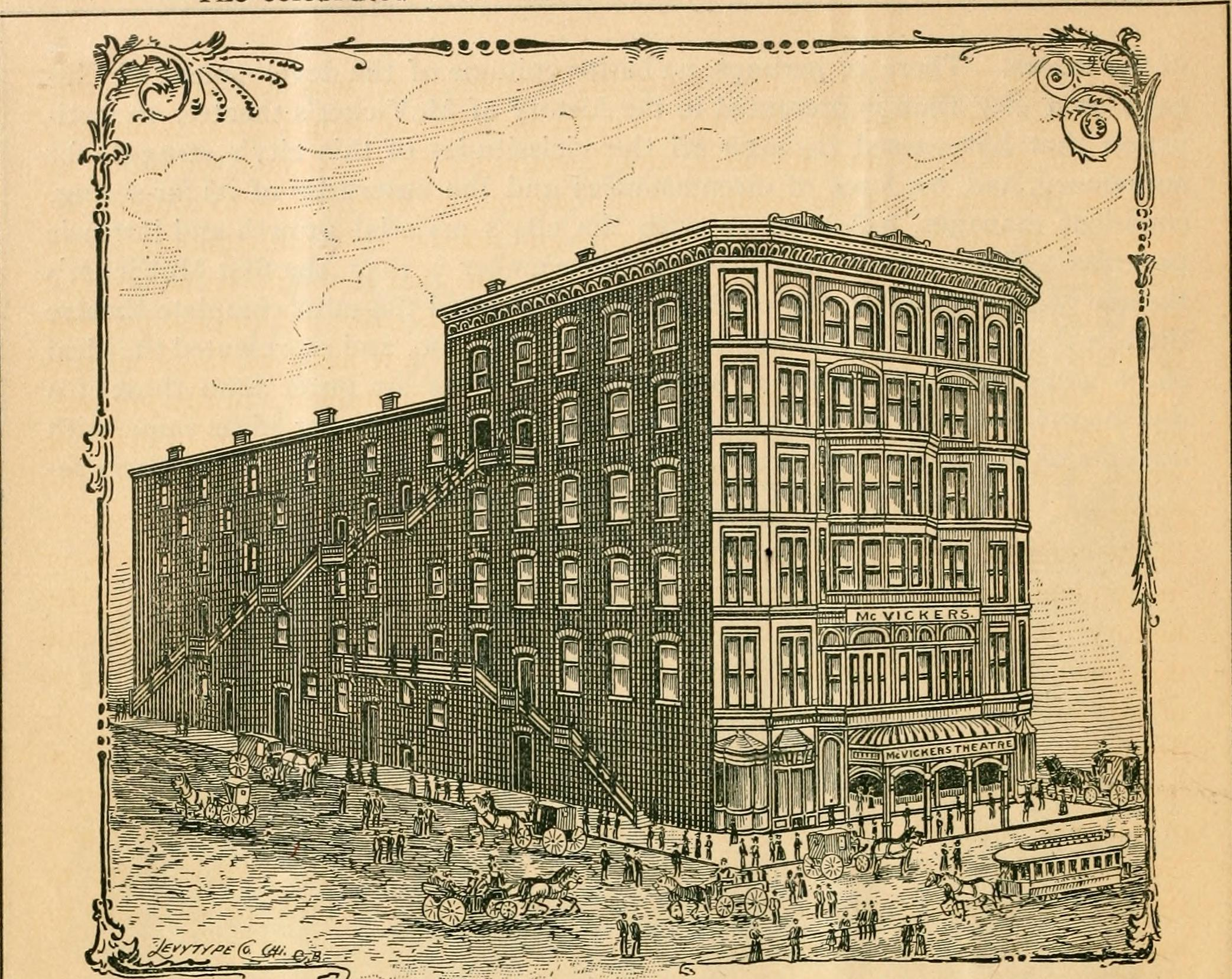
McVicker's theatre in 1891

The theater's decor, interior design work, steelwork, terracotta and other features were designed by many of Chicago's leading firms including structural steel work by Albert H. Wolf; mason work by William D. Price; carpentery by Thos. Clark & Sons; ventilation and galvanized iron work by Jas. A. Miller & Bro.; plumbing and electric light fixtures by E. Baggot; painting and decorating by Healy & Millet; carpets and draperies by Marshall Field & Co.; seating by A. H. Andrews & Co.; electric lighting by Chicago Edison Co.; ornamental plasterwork by Schneider & Kline; ornamental iron work by W. H. Cheneworth Co.; tile work and fire-proofing by Illinois Terra Cotta, plain plasterwork by The Mackolite Plaster Co. and Michael Cyr; and bas-relief panels, by LaSalles. The curtains March Through Illinois and The Fort Dearborn Massacre were by Johannes Gelert; and the principal curtain, Chicago in 1833, by Walter Burridge. The act drop curtain, Reverie of the Future, was by Ernest Albert.
