= Edward Marble =

American actor and songwriter

Edward Stevenson Marble (September 3, 1846 – January 3, 1900) was a 19th-century American actor and songwriter. Among other works, he wrote Tuxedo for vaudeville.

He was the son of the actor and comedian Dan Marble and Anna Warren, and the father of Anna Marble, who married the playwright Channing Pollock.
