= Brander Matthews =

American academic (1852–1929)

James Brander Matthews
- Matthews circa 1910
- Born: February 21, 1852; New Orleans, Louisiana, US
- Died: March 31, 1929 (aged 77); New York City, New York, USA
- Education: Columbia University
- Occupations: Professor of Dramatic Literature, writer

James Brander Matthews (February 21, 1852 – March 31, 1929) was an American academic, writer and literary critic. He was the first full-time professor of dramatic literature at Columbia University in New York and played a significant role in establishing theater as a subject worthy of formal study by academics. His interests ranged from Shakespeare, Molière, and Ibsen to French boulevard comedies, folk theater, and the new realism of his own time.

== Early life ==
Matthews was born to a wealthy family in New Orleans and grew up in New York City.

He attended Columbia College, graduating in 1871. There, he was a member of the Philolexian Society and the fraternity of Delta Psi (St. Anthony Hall). He graduated from Columbia Law School in 1873. However, he demonstrated no real interest in law and never really needed to work for a living.

Later, Matthews' father went bankrupt and the family fortune was lost. However, his mother's money provided him with a comfortable living.

== Career ==
=== Writing ===
Matthews began a literary career, writing novels, plays, short stories, books about drama, and biographies of actors during the 1880s and 1890. He wrote three books of sketches of city life. One of these, Vignettes of Manhattan (1894), was dedicated to his friend Theodore Roosevelt.

Brander Matthews was a prolific and varied writer, author of more than thirty books. The claim to fame of one of his plays is its mention in Theodore Dreiser's novel Sister Carrie: it is the melodrama, A Gold Mine, which the character Carrie attends and which causes her to consider a drama career. Some of his surveys of American literature and drama sold very well as high-school and college texts. One of his earliest books, French Dramatists of the Nineteenth Century (1881), is a scholarly study of the subject and was revised and reprinted twice during two decades, while his 1919 autobiography, These Many Years, is a story of an education in the arts by a man who lived a rich and productive life. It also offers an evocation of life in Manhattan c. 1860–1900. Matthews published a biography of Molière in 1910 and a biography of Shakespeare in 1913.

=== Teaching ===
From 1892 to 1900, he was a professor of literature at Columbia University, becoming professor of Dramatic Literature until his retirement in 1924. He was known as an engaging lecturer and a charismatic, if demanding, teacher. His influence was such that a popular pun claimed that an entire generation had been "brandered by the same Matthews."

Matthews' students knew him as a man well-versed in the history of drama and as knowledgeable about continental dramatists as he was about American and British playwrights. Long before they were fashionable, he championed playwrights who were regarded as too bold for Americans, such as Hermann Sudermann, Arthur Pinero, and preeminently Henrik Ibsen, about whom he wrote frequently and eloquently. His students also knew him as an opinionated man with somewhat conservative politics.

Playwright S.N. Behrman, who studied with him during 1917, recalled in his memoirs, "One day I made the mistake of bringing into class a copy of [the liberal magazine] The New Republic. I had, actually, a contribution in it. Matthews looked at The New Republic and said, 'I am sorry to see you wasting your time on that stuff.' As a staunch Republican and intimate of Theodore Roosevelt's, he had his duty to do." He could also be "easy and anecdotal", Behrman acknowledged, and he was respected on campus as a man-of-the-world. He taught that performance was the main art of drama, not the literary texts of plays.

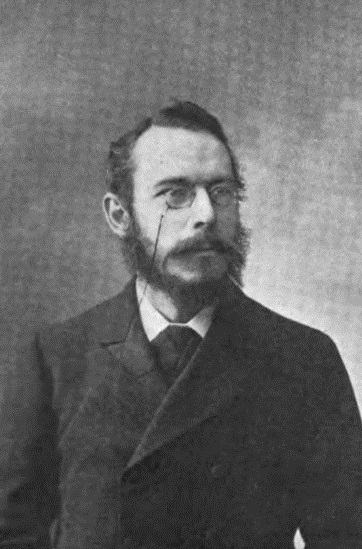
Brander Matthews

Other students recalled him as a teacher who elicited "mingled affection and impatience" and who behaved in a manner that never attempted to hide his privileged life and connoisseurship. His relations with Columbia colleagues were sometimes adversarial. His conservatism became more pronounced during his later years: he was adamant about not admitting women to his graduate courses and publicly expressed the opinion that women did not have the natural ability to be great playwrights. According to Mark Van Doren, he taught an "ancient" American literature elective that he refused to revise over the decades. Not surprisingly, he was a natural target for the World War I-era generation of writers and activists. Reviewing Matthews' autobiography in 1917, the radical critic and fellow Columbia graduate Randolph Bourne complained that for Matthews, "literature was a gesture of gentility and not a comprehension of life". In his publication On Native Grounds, Alfred Kazin characterized him as a "literary gentleman".

Matthews taught a number of students who later had major dramatic careers, including playwright Behrman and drama critics Stark Young, Ludwig Lewisohn, and John Gassner.

During his long tenure at Columbia University, Matthews created and curated a "dramatic museum" of costumes, scripts, props, and other stage memorabilia. Housed in a four-room complex in Philosophy Hall, the collection was divided and sold after his death. However, its books were incorporated into the university library and its dioramas of the Globe Theatre and other historic dramatic venues have been dispersed for public display around campus, mainly in Dodge Hall.

Despite his complacent persona during later years, wearing mutton-chop whiskers long after that style has passed, Matthews was always an intensely social man. He regularly invited students to his West End apartment for evenings of conversation. He retired from Columbia University in 1924 at the age of seventy-two.

== Professional affiliations ==
Matthews had an active professional life off-campus. He was one of the founders of the Authors' Club and the Players' Club and was one of the organizers of the American Copyright League. He was a member of the American Academy of Arts and Letters and president of the National Institute of Arts and Letters during 1913. In 1906, he was named the first chairman of the Simplified Spelling Board and served as president of the Modern Language Association of America during 1910.

== Honors ==
- Matthews was the inspiration for the now-destroyed Brander Matthews Theater on 117th Street, between Amsterdam Avenue and Morningside Drive.
- An English professorship with his name still exists at Columbia University.
- In 1907, the French government decorated him with the Legion of Honor for his services in promoting the cause of French drama.

== Works ==
- The Theatres of Paris (1880)
- French Dramatists of the Nineteenth Century (1881, revised in 1891 and 1901)
- Margery's Lovers (1884)
- Love at First Sight (1885)
- Actors and Actresses of the United States and Great Britain (five volumes, 1886), with Laurence Hutton
- A Secret of the Sea (1886)
- The Last Meeting, A Story (1887)
- A Family Tree, and Other Stories (1889)
- In the Vestibule Limited (1892)
- A tale of twenty-five hours (1892) with George H. Jessop
- Tom Paulding : the story of a search for buried treasure in the streets of New York (1892)
- Americanisms and Briticisms (1892)
- The Decision of the Court (1893)
- The Story of a Story, and other Stories (1893)
- This picture and that : a comedy (1894)
- Vignettes of Manhattan (1894)
- Studies of the Stage (1894)
- Pen and ink : papers on subjects of more or less importance (1894)
- The Royal Marine: An Idyl of Narragansett Pier (1894) (Harper's New Monthly Magazine June 1894)
- The Gift of Story-Telling (1895) (Harper's New Monthly Magazine Oct 1895)
- His Father's Son (1895), a novel
- Bookbindings Old and New: Notes of a book-lover, with an account of the Grolier Club of New York (1895)
- Aspects of Fiction (1896; revised in 1902)
- An Introduction to the Study of American Literature (1896)
- Tales of Fantasy and Fact (1896)
- Studies in Local Color (1898)
- A Confident To-Morrow (1900)
- The Action and the Word (1900)
- The Historical Novel and Other Essays (1901)
- Parts of Speech, Essays on English (1901)
- The Philosophy of the Short-Story (1901)
- The Development of the Drama (1903)
- American Character (1906)
- The Short Story (1907)
- Americans of the Future and Other Essays (1909)
- Molière: His Life and Works (1910)
- Introduction to the Study of American literature (1911)
- Fugitives from Justice (1912) Poetry.
- Vistas of New York (1912)
- Shakespeare as a Playwright (1913)
- On Acting (1914)
- The Oxford Book of American Essays (1914)
- A Book About the Theater (1916)
- These Many Years (1917): autobiography
- Principles of Playmaking (1919)
- Playwrights on Playmaking (1923)

== Personal life ==
Matthews married Ada Harland, an actress who had given up her career when they married. They had a daughter.

During the 1890s he was a charter member of an informal group known as "the Friendly Sons of Saint Bacchus", which met in a bohemian cafe in Greenwich Village for entertainment and readings. Other members of the group included the erudite and cosmopolitan critic James Gibbons Huneker and the rowdy Ashcan school painter George Luks, two New Yorkers notorious for their alcohol drinking, whose presence would suggest that the "sons" were not devoted to purely intellectual pastimes.

Matthews was a member of the long-running Gin Mill Club, a more exclusive informal organization whose members included Columbia University's president, Nicholas Murray Butler, and numerous public officials equally devoted to fraternal evenings of conversation, good wine, and good food.

He was friends with many notable men, including. Robert Louis Stevenson, Rudyard Kipling, Bret Harte, Mark Twain, William Dean Howells, and Theodore Roosevelt. His relationship with Twain had a bantering quality; in his famous essay "Fenimore Cooper's Literary Offenses," Twain lambasted Matthews' statements concerning Cooper's literary merits). Matthews' correspondence with Roosevelt, which extended from the 1880s through the White House years, was published posthumously. They shared a temperamental affinity as well as an interest in the cause of simplified spelling.

In 1929, he died in New York City five years after his retirement.

== Sources ==
- Green, Ashbel (ed.). My Columbia: Reminiscences of University Life. New York: Columbia University Press, 2005.
- Matthews, Brander. These Many Years: Recollections of a New Yorker. New York: Scribner, 1919.
- Oliver, Lawrence J. Brander Matthews, Theodore Roosevelt, and the Politics of American Literature, 1880-1920. Knoxville: University of Tennessee, 1995.
- Stein, Howard. "Brander Matthews and Theater Studies at Columbia." Living Legacies: Columbia University of the City of New York. in Columbia Magazine, Spring 2002
