= Eliza Riddle Field =

American actress

Eliza Riddle Field (c. 1812-1871) was an American stage actress. She was famous in the American South and was described by James Murdoch as "one of the most beautiful and accomplished actresses of the American stage".

Between 1826 and 1856, she was a leading lady and star attraction of Noah Ludlow's and Solomon Smith's theater company, which performed in their own theaters in a circuit between New Orleans, Natchez, St. Louis, Mobile and Huntsville. She was particularly known for her roles as heroines from the tragedies of Shakespeare.
