= List of Triangle Film Corporation films =

List of feature films distributed by the Triangle Film Corporation between 1915 and 1919. The company also released a number of short comedy films.

== 1915 ==
Title	Release date	Director	Notes
The Iron Strain	September 23, 1915	Reginald Barker	lost
The Lamb	September 23, 1915	Christy Cabanne	extant
The Coward	October 3, 1915	Reginald Barker	extant
The Disciple	October 17, 1915	William S. Hart	extant
The Lily and the Rose	November 7, 1915	Paul Powell	extant
Jordan Is a Hard Road	November 14, 1915	Allan Dwan	lost
Old Heidelberg	November 14, 1915	John Emerson	extant
The Edge of the Abyss	November 21, 1915	Walter Edwards	lost
Martyrs of the Alamo	November 21, 1915	Christy Cabanne	extant
The Penitentes	November 21, 1915	Jack Conway	lost
Between Men	November 28, 1915	William S. Hart	extant
Cross Currents	November 28, 1915	Francis J. Grandon	lost
The Sable Lorcha	November 28, 1915	Lloyd Ingraham	lost
Double Trouble	December 5, 1915	Christy Cabanne	extant
The Golden Claw	December 5, 1915	Reginald Barker	lost
Aloha Oe	December 12, 1915	Richard Stanton	lost
The Despoiler	December 15, 1915	Reginald Barker	lost
Don Quixote	December 19, 1915	Edward Dillon	lost
The Winged Idol	December 19, 1915	Scott Sidney	lost
Civilization	December 31, 1915	Reginald Barker, Thomas H. Ince	extant

== 1916 ==
Title	Release date	Director	Notes
Peggy	January 2, 1916	Thomas H. Ince, Charles Giblyn	lost
The Wood Nymph	January 2, 1916	Paul Powell	lost
Let Katie Do It	January 6, 1916	Chester Franklin, Sidney Franklin	extant
The Corner	January 9, 1916	Walter Edwards	lost
The Missing Links	January 16, 1916	Lloyd Ingraham	lost
The Conqueror	January 23, 1916	Reginald Barker	lost
The Green Swamp	January 30, 1916	Scott Sidney	extant
Acquitted	February 6, 1916	Paul Powell	lost
The Three Musketeers	February 6, 1916	Charles Swickard	extant
His Picture in the Papers	February 13, 1916	John Emerson	extant
Honor's Altar	February 14, 1916	Walter Edwards	lost
Betty of Greystone	February 20, 1916	Allan Dwan	incomplete
Bullets and Brown Eyes	February 20, 1916	Scott Sidney	lost
Martha's Vindication	February 20, 1916	Chester Franklin, Sidney Franklin	lost
The Raiders	February 27, 1916	Charles Swickard	lost
The Last Act	February 27, 1916	Walter Edwards	lost
Daphne and the Pirate	March 5, 1916	Christy Cabanne	lost
Hell's Hinges	March 5, 1916	Charles Swickard	extant
The Moral Fabric	March 5, 1916	Raymond B. West	lost
The Flying Torpedo	March 12, 1916	John B. O'Brien, Christy Cabanne	lost
The Habit of Happiness	March 12, 1916	Allan Dwan	extant
Hoodoo Ann	March 26, 1916	Lloyd Ingraham	extant
Little Meena's Romance	April 2, 1916	Paul Powell	incomplete
The Waifs	April 2, 1916	Scott Sidney	lost
The Aryan	April 9, 1916	William S. Hart, Reginald Barker	incomplete
The Good Bad-Man	April 13, 1916	Allan Dwan	incomplete
Sold for Marriage	April 16, 1916	Christy Cabanne	extant
The Stepping Stone	April 16, 1916	Reginald Barker, Thomas H. Ince	lost
Sunshine Dad	April 23, 1916	Edward Dillon	extant
Civilization's Child	April 23, 1916	Charles Giblyn	lost
The Beggar of Cawnpore	April 30, 1916	Charles Swickard	extant
The Bugle Call	April 30, 1916	Reginald Barker	lost
The Children in the House	April 30, 1916	Chester Franklin, Sidney Franklin	extant
The No-Good Guy	May 7, 1916	Walter Edwards	lost
Not My Sister	May 14, 1916	Charles Giblyn	lost
Susan Rocks the Boat	May 16, 1916	Paul Powell	lost
A Child of the Paris Streets	May 21, 1916	Lloyd Ingraham	extant
The Primal Lure	May 21, 1916	William S. Hart	fragment
The Market of Vain Desire	May 28, 1916	Reginald Barker	extant
Reggie Mixes In	May 28, 1916	Christy Cabanne	extant
Mr. Goode, Samaritan	May 29, 1916	Edward Dillon	lost
Going Straight	June 4, 1916	Chester Franklin, Sidney Franklin	extant
Macbeth	June 4, 1916	John Emerson	lost
The Sorrows of Love	June 11, 1916	Charles Giblyn	lost
The Dividend	June 18, 1916	Walter Edwards, Thomas H. Ince	lost
An Innocent Magdalene	June 18, 1916	Allan Dwan	lost
The Apostle of Vengeance	June 25, 1916	Clifford Smith	lost
Flirting with Fate	June 25, 1916	Christy Cabanne	extant
A Wild Girl of the Sierras	June 25, 1916	Paul Powell	lost
Casey at the Bat	July 2, 1916	Lloyd Ingraham	lost
The Phantom	July 2, 1916	Charles Giblyn	lost
The Deserter	July 9, 1916	Walter Edwards	extant
Eye of the Night	July 16, 1916	Walter Edwards	lost
The Little School Ma'am	July 16, 1916	Chester Franklin, Sidney Franklin	lost
The Captive God	July 23, 1916	Charles Swickard	extant
Stranded	July 23, 1916	Lloyd Ingraham	lost
The Half-Breed	July 30, 1916	Allan Dwan	extant
The Payment	July 30, 1916	Raymond B. West	lost
Home	July 30, 1916	Raymond B. West	lost
Honor Thy Name	August 6, 1916	Charles Giblyn	lost
The Marriage of Molly-O	August 6, 1916	Paul Powell	lost
The Devil's Needle	August 13, 1916	Chester Withey	incomplete
Shell 43	August 13, 1916	Reginald Barker	lost
Hell-to-Pay Austin	August 20, 1916	Paul Powell	lost
Lieutenant Danny, U.S.A	August 20, 1916	Walter Edwards	lost
Pillars of Society	August 27, 1916	Raoul Walsh	lost
Gretchen the Greenhorn	September 3, 1916	Chester Franklin, Sidney Franklin	extant
The Patriot	September 3, 1916	William S. Hart	lost
Intolerance	September 5, 1916	D. W. Griffith	incomplete
The Little Liar	September 10, 1916	Lloyd Ingraham	lost
Manhattan Madness	September 10, 1916	Allan Dwan	lost
The Thoroughbred	September 10, 1916	Reginald Barker	lost
The Wolf Woman	September 17, 1916	Raymond B. West	fragment
The Dawn Maker	September 24, 1916	William S. Hart	lost
Diane of the Follies	September 24, 1916	Christy Cabanne	lost
The Jungle Child	October 1, 1916	Walter Edwards	lost
Plain Jane	October 8, 1916	Charles Miller	extant
The Rummy	October 8, 1916	Paul Powell	extant
The Old Folks at Home	October 15, 1916	Chester Withey	unclear
The Return of Draw Egan	October 15, 1916	William S. Hart	incomplete
Fifty-Fifty	October 22, 1916	Allan Dwan	extant
The Vagabond Prince	October 22, 1916	Charles Giblyn	extant
A Sister of Six	October 29, 1916	Chester Franklin, Sidney Franklin	fragment
Somewhere in France	October 29, 1916	Charles Giblyn	lost
American Aristocracy	November 5, 1916	Lloyd Ingraham	extant
Atta Boy's Last Race	November 5, 1916	George Siegmann	lost
A Corner in Colleens	November 5, 1916	Charles Miller	lost
Jim Grimsby's Boy	November 12, 1916	Reginald Barker	lost
The Microscope Mystery	November 19, 1916	Paul Powell	incomplete
The Honorable Algy	November 19, 1916	Raymond B. West	lost
The Children Pay	November 26, 1919	Lloyd Ingraham	extant
The Devil's Double	November 26, 1919	William S. Hart	lost
Children of the Feud	December 2, 1916	Joseph Henabery	lost
The Criminal	December 2, 1916	Reginald Barker	lost
The Wharf Rat	December 9, 1916	Chester Withey	lost
Bawbs O' Blue Ridge	December 9, 1916	Charles Miller	lost
A Gamble in Souls	December 9, 1916	Walter Edwards	incomplete
The Matrimaniac	December 16, 1916	Paul Powell	extant
The Sin Ye Do	December 16, 1916	Walter Edwards	lost
The Heiress at Coffee Dan's	December 23, 1916	Edward Dillon	lost
The Americano	December 24, 1916	John Emerson	extant
Three of Many	December 24, 1916	Reginald Barker	lost
The House Built Upon Sand	December 31, 1916	Edward Morrissey	lost

== 1917 ==
Title	Release date	Director	Notes
Truthful Tulliver	January 7, 1917	William S. Hart	extant
The Weaker Sex	January 7, 1917	Raymond B. West	extant
The Little Yank	January 14, 1917	George Siegmann	extant
The Bride of Hate	January 14, 1917	Walter Edwards	lost
The Iced Bullet	January 21, 1917	Reginald Barker	extant
Nina, the Flower Girl	January 21, 1917	Lloyd Ingraham	lost
Chicken Casey	January 28, 1917	Raymond B. West	incomplete (Reels 1 & 2 Of 5)
Envy	January 29, 1917	Richard Ridgely	lost
Jim Bludso	February 4, 1917	Tod Browning	lost
The Crab	February 4, 1917	Walter Edwards	extant
Pride	February 5, 1917	Richard Ridgely	extant
A Girl of the Timber Claims	February 11, 1917	Paul Powell	lost
The Gunfighter	February 11, 1917	William S. Hart	extant
The Bad Boy	February 18, 1917	Chester Withey	lost
Princess of the Dark	February 18, 1917	Charles Miller	lost
Stage Struck	February 25, 1917	Edward Morrissey	extant
The Last of the Ingrams	February 26, 1917	Walter Edwards	lost
Passion	February 26, 1917	Richard Ridgely	lost
Back of the Man	March 4, 1917	Reginald Barker	lost
Betsy's Burglar	March 4, 1917	Paul Powell	lost
Wrath	March 5, 1917	Theodore Marston	lost
A Love Sublime	March 11, 1917	Tod Browning	lost
The Little Brother	March 11, 1917	Charles Miller	lost
The Seventh Sin	March 17, 1917	Theodore Marston	extant
A Daughter of the Poor	March 18, 1917	Edward Dillon	incomplete
Blood Will Tell	March 18, 1917	Charles Miller	lost
A Woman's Awakening	March 25, 1917	Chester Withey	lost
The Dark Road	April 1, 1917	Charles Miller	lost
Her Father's Keeper	April 2, 1917	Arthur Rosson, Richard Rosson	lost
The Boss of the Lazy Y	April 7, 1917	Clifford Smith	lost
Her Official Fathers	April 8, 1917	Elmer Clifton, Joseph Henabery	lost
Sweetheart of the Doomed	April 8, 1917	Reginald Barker	lost
An Old Fashioned Young Man	April 15, 1917	Lloyd Ingraham	lost
Paddy O'Hara	April 15, 1917	Walter Edwards	lost
Cheerful Givers	April 15, 1917	Paul Powell	lost
The Desert Man	April 22, 1917	William S. Hart	fragment
Hands Up!	April 29, 1917	Tod Browning	lost
The Pinch Hitter	April 29, 1917	Victor Schertzinger	extant
Might and the Man	May 6, 1917	Edward Dillon	lost
The Snarl	May 6, 1917	Raymond B. West	lost
Happiness	May 13, 1917	Reginald Barker	extant
The Man Who Made Good	May 13, 1917	Arthur Rosson	lost
Souls Triumphant	May 20, 1917	John B. O'Brien	lost
Wild Winship's Widow	May 20, 1917	Charles Miller	lost
The Square Deal Man	May 25, 1917	William S. Hart	extant
Madame Bo-Peep	May 27, 1917	Chester Withey	lost
The Millionaire Vagrant	May 27, 1917	Victor Schertzinger	extant
Wolf Lowry	May 27, 1917	William S. Hart	extant
American - That's All	June 3, 1917	Arthur Rosson	lost
The Girl, Glory	June 10, 1917	Roy William Neill	extant
Love or Justice	June 10, 1917	Walter Edwards	lost
Paws of the Bear	June 17, 1917	Reginald Barker	lost
Her Excellency, the Governor	June 24, 1917	Albert Parker	lost
Madcap Madge	June 24, 1917	Raymond B. West	extant
The Clodhopper	June 24, 1917	Victor Schertzinger	extant
The Hater of Men	July 1, 1917	Charles Miller	extant
The Flame of the Yukon	July 1, 1917	Charles Miller	extant
Time Locks and Diamonds	July 8, 1917	Walter Edwards	lost
A Strange Transgressor	July 8, 1917	Reginald Barker	lost
The Mother Instinct	July 15, 1917	Roy William Neill	lost
The Sawdust Ring	July 15, 1917	Charles Miller, Paul Powell	incomplete
In Slumberland	July 22, 1917	Irvin Willat	lost
Sudden Jim	July 22, 1917	Victor Schertzinger	lost
A Successful Failure	July 22, 1917	Arthur Rosson	
Borrowed Plumage	July 29, 1917	Raymond B. West	incomplete
An Even Break	August 5, 1917	Lambert Hillyer	extant
The Food Gamblers	August 5, 1917	Albert Parker	lost
Golden Rule Kate	August 12, 1917	Reginald Barker	incomplete
Wee Lady Betty	August 19, 1917	Charles Miller	lost
Wooden Shoes	August 20, 1917	Raymond B. West	lost
Grafters	August 26, 1917	Arthur Rosson	extant
Master of His Home	August 30, 1917	Walter Edwards	lost
The Man Hater	September 2, 1917	Albert Parker	lost
Ten of Diamonds	September 2, 1917	Raymond B. West	extant
The Cold Deck	September 3, 1917	William S. Hart	incomplete
Polly Ann	September 9, 1917	Charles Miller	lost
Idolators	September 9, 1917	Walter Edwards	lost
Mountain Dew	September 16, 1917	Thomas N. Heffron	lost
The Haunted House	September 20, 1917	Albert Parker	extant
Bond of Fear	September 23, 1917	Jack Conway	extant
Flying Colors	September 23, 1917	Frank Borzage	fragment
The Devil Dodger	September 23, 1917	Clifford Smith	lost
Broadway Arizona	September 30, 1917	Lynn Reynolds	extant
The Tar Heel Warrior	September 30, 1917	E. Mason Hopper	lost
Ashes of Hope	October 7, 1917	Walter Edwards	incomplete
One Shot Ross	October 14, 1917	Clifford Smith	lost
Wild Sumac	October 14, 1917	William V. Mong	lost
The Firefly of Tough Luck	October 21, 1917	E. Mason Hopper	lost
Cassidy	October 21, 1917	Arthur Rosson	lost
The Stainless Barrier	October 28, 1917	Thomas N. Heffron	lost
Up or Down?	November 4, 1917	Lynn Reynolds	lost
Fighting Back	November 4, 1917	Raymond Wells	lost
Indiscreet Corinne	November 11, 1917	John Francis Dillon	extant
The Medicine Man	November 11, 1917	Clifford Smith	lost
A Case at Law	November 18, 1917	Arthur Rosson	lost
The Fuel of Life	November 18, 1917	Walter Edwards	lost
For Valour	November 25, 1917	Albert Parker	lost
The Regenerates	November 25, 1917	E. Mason Hopper	extant
Until They Get Me	December 2, 1917	Frank Borzage	extant
The Sudden Gentleman	December 2, 1917	Thomas N. Heffron	fragment
Fanatics	December 9, 1917	Raymond Wells	lost
The Learning of Jim Benton	December 9, 1917	Clifford Smith	lost
The Ship of Doom	December 15, 1917	Wyndham Gittens	lost
Because of a Woman	December 16, 1917	Jack Conway	lost
The Maternal Spark	December 16, 1917	Gilbert P. Hamilton	lost
The Gown of Destiny	December 30, 1917	Lynn Reynolds	extant
Framing Framers	December 30, 1917	Ferris Hartman	lost

== 1918 ==
Title	Release date	Director	Notes
Without Honor	January 5, 1918	E. Mason Hopper	extant
Betty Takes a Hand	January 6, 1918	John Francis Dillon	extant
The Man Above the Law	January 6, 1918	Raymond Wells	lost
I Love You	January 13, 1918	Walter Edwards	lost
The Argument	January 20, 1918	Walter Edwards	lost
The Flames of Chance	January 20, 1918	Raymond Wells	lost
The Gun Woman	January 27, 1918	Frank Borzage	extant
Her American Husband	January 27, 1918	E. Mason Hopper	lost
The Hopper	February 3, 1918	Thomas N. Heffron	lost
Limousine Life	February 3, 1918	John Francis Dillon	lost
Real Folks	February 10, 1918	Walter Edwards	lost
Captain of His Soul	February 10, 1918	Gilbert P. Hamilton	lost
Keith of the Border	February 17, 1918	Clifford Smith	lost
From Two to Six	February 17, 1918	Albert Parker	lost
Little Red Decides	February 24, 1918	Jack Conway	lost
A Soul in Trust	February 24, 1918	Gilbert P. Hamilton	lost
Heiress for a Day	March 3, 1918	John Francis Dillon	lost
The Shoes That Danced	March 3, 1918	Frank Borzage	lost
The Hard Rock Breed	March 10, 1918	Raymond Wells	lost
The Sea Panther	March 10, 1918	Thomas N. Heffron	lost
The Answer	March 17, 1918	E. Mason Hopper	lost
Faith Endurin'	March 17, 1918	Clifford Smith	lost
Innocent's Progress	March 24, 1918	Frank Borzage	lost
Nancy Comes Home	March 24, 1918	John Francis Dillon	lost
The Vortex	March 31, 1918	Gilbert P. Hamilton	lost
The Love Brokers	March 31, 1918	E. Mason Hopper	lost
The Law of the Great Northwest	April 14, 1918	Raymond Wells	lost
Who Killed Walton?	April 14, 1918	Thomas N. Heffron	lost
Society for Sale	April 21, 1918	Frank Borzage	lost
The Hand at the Window	April 21, 1918	Raymond Wells	lost
Paying His Debt	April 28, 1918	Clifford Smith	lost
The Lonely Woman	April 28, 1918	Thomas N. Heffron	lost
Her Decision	May 2, 1918	Jack Conway	lost
An Honest Man	May 6, 1918	Frank Borzage	lost
Wolves of the Border	May 12, 1918	Clifford Smith	lost
Old Hartwell's Cub	May 19, 1918	Thomas N. Heffron	lost
Who Is to Blame?	May 19, 1918	Frank Borzage	lost
Old Love for New	May 26, 1918	Raymond Wells	lost
High Stakes	May 26, 1918	Arthur Hoyt	lost
The Man Who Woke Up	June 2, 1918	James McLaughlin	lost
The Red-Haired Cupid	June 2, 1918	Clifford Smith	lost
Madame Sphinx	June 9, 1918	Thomas N. Heffron	lost
The Last Rebel	June 9, 1918	Gilbert P. Hamilton	lost
Station Content	June 16, 1918	Arthur Hoyt	incomplete
His Enemy, the Law	June 16, 1918	Raymond Wells	lost
You Can't Believe Everything	June 23, 1918	Jack Conway	lost
Closin' In	June 23, 1918	James McLaughlin	lost
The Painted Lily	June 30, 1918	Thomas N. Heffron	lost
The Fly God	June 30, 1918	Clifford Smith	lost
Everywoman's Husband	July 7, 1918	Gilbert P. Hamilton	extant
A Good Loser	July 7, 1918	Dick Donaldson	lost
Marked Cards	July 14, 1918	Henri D'Elba	lost
Hell's End	July 14, 1918	James McLaughlin	lost
By Proxy	July 21, 1918	Clifford Smith	lost
False Ambition	July 21, 1918	Gilbert P. Hamilton	lost
Beyond the Shadows	July 28, 1918	James McLaughlin	lost
The Golden Fleece	July 28, 1918	Gilbert P. Hamilton	lost
Shifting Sands	August 1, 1918	Albert Parker	extant
The Price of Applause	August 4, 1918	Thomas N. Heffron	lost
Alias Mary Brown	August 4, 1918	Henri D'Elba	lost
They're Off	August 10, 1918	Roy William Neill	incomplete
Cactus Crandall	August 11, 1918	Clifford Smith	lost
The Ghost Flower	August 18, 1918	Frank Borzage	lost
High Tide	August 18, 1918	Gilbert P. Hamilton	lost
Daughter Angele	August 25, 1918	William C. Dowlan	extant
Wild Life	August 25, 1918	Henry Otto	lost
The Mask	September 1, 1918	Thomas N. Heffron	lost
Untamed	September 1, 1918	Clifford Smith	lost
Mystic Faces	September 8, 1918	E. Mason Hopper	lost
The Secret Code	September 8, 1918	Albert Parker	lost
The Atom	September 15, 1918	Frank Borzage	lost
Desert Law	September 15, 1918	Jack Conway	lost
The Grey Parasol	September 22, 1918	Lawrence C. Windom	lost
Tony America	October 6, 1918	Thomas N. Heffron	lost
The Pretender	October 20, 1918	Clifford Smith	lost
The Reckoning Day	October 20, 1918	Roy Clements	lost
Deuce Duncan	November 24, 1918	Thomas N. Heffron	lost
Love's Pay Day	December 1, 1918	E. Mason Hopper	lost
The Silent Rider	December 8, 1918	Clifford Smith	lost
Irish Eyes	December 15, 1918	William C. Dowlan	lost
Crown Jewels	December 22, 1918	Roy Clements	lost
Wife or Country	December 29, 1918	E. Mason Hopper	lost

== 1919 ==
Title	Release date	Director	Notes
Restless Souls	February 2, 1919	William C. Dowlan	lost
Secret Marriage	February 9, 1919	Tom Ricketts	lost
Child of M'sieu	February 16, 1919	Harrish Ingraham	lost
A Wild Goose Chase	March 2, 1919	Harry Beaumont	lost
The Railroader	March 9, 1919	Colin Campbell	lost
It's a Bear	March 16, 1919	Lawrence C. Windom	lost
Toton the Apache	March 30, 1919	Frank Borzage	lost
A Regular Fellow	April 13, 1919	Christy Cabanne	extant
Devil McCare	April 20, 1919	Lorimer Johnston	lost
The Follies Girl	April 27, 1919	John Francis Dillon	extant
Taxi	May 11, 1919	Lawrence C. Windom	lost
The Water Lily	May 18, 1919	George Ridgwell	extant
The Mayor of Filbert	May 25, 1919	Christy Cabanne	lost
Love's Prisoner	June 8, 1919	John Francis Dillon	extant
Upside Down	June 22, 1919	Lawrence C. Windom	lost
Prudence on Broadway	July 6, 1919	Frank Borzage	lost
The Unbroken Promise	July 27, 1919	Frank Powell	lost
Fruits of Passion	August 9, 1919	George Ridgwell	lost
Three Black Eyes	August 31, 1919	Charles Horan	lost

== Bibliography ==
- Munden, Kenneth White. The American Film Institute Catalog of Motion Pictures Produced in the United States, Part 1. University of California Press, 1997.
