= Walter Walker (actor) =

American actor (1864–1947)

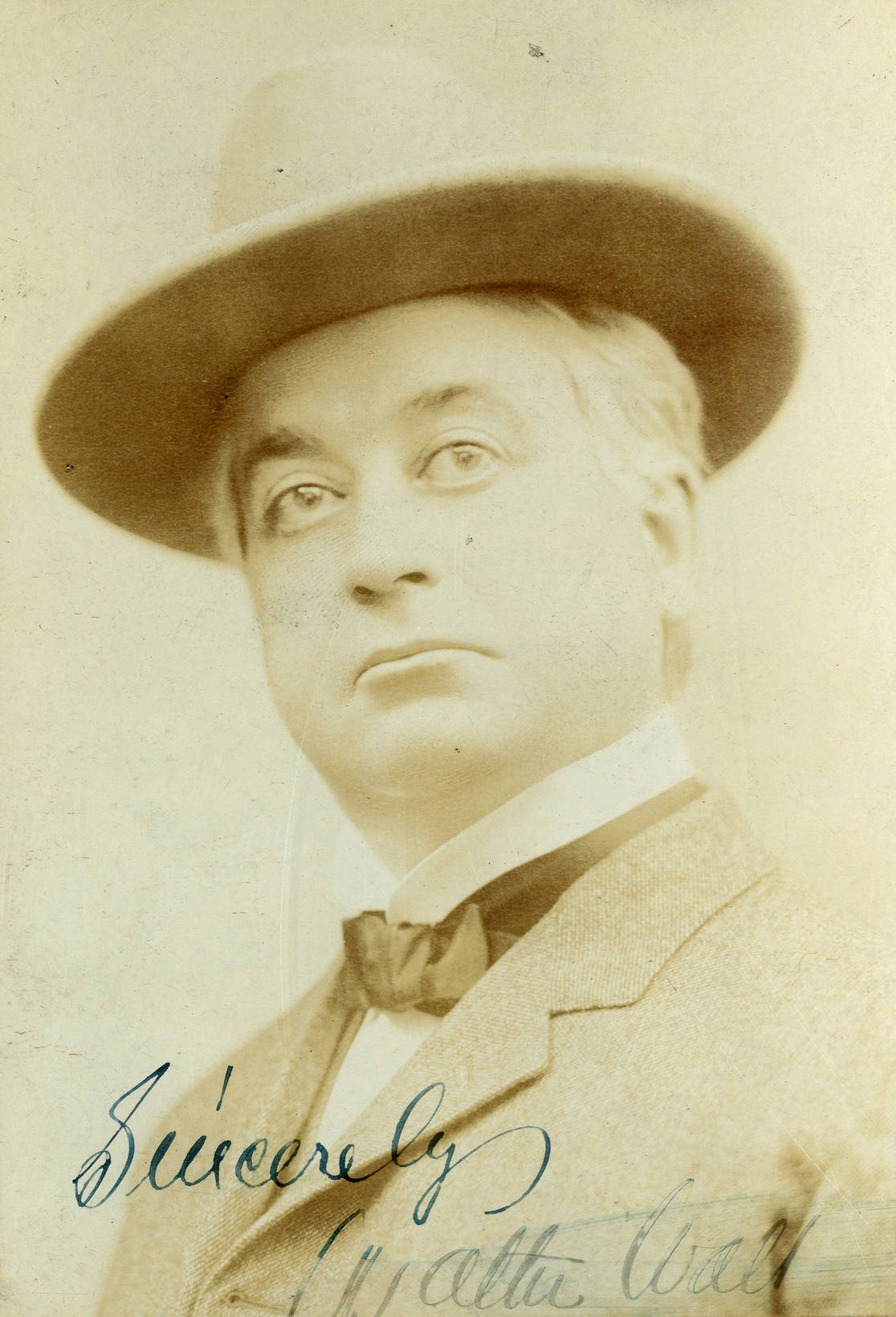
- Walker in 1906
- Born: March 13, 1864; New York City, U.S.
- Died: December 4, 1947 (aged 83); Honolulu, Hawaii, U.S.
- Occupation: Actor
- Years active: 1915–1938

Walter Walker (March 13, 1864 – December 4, 1947) was an American actor of the stage and screen during the first half of the twentieth century. Born in New York City on March 13, 1864, Walker would have a career in theater prior to entering the film industry. By 1915 he was appearing in Broadway productions, his first being Sinners, written by Pulitzer Prize-winning playwright, Owen Davis. His film debut was in a leading role in 1917's American – That's All. He had a lengthy career, in both film and on stage, appearing in numerous plays and over 80 films. Walker died on December 4, 1947, in Honolulu, Hawaii.

== Career ==
Walker had a long career in theater, eventually rising to appear in Broadway productions, beginning with 1915's Sinners, which was written by Pulitzer Prize-winning playwright, Owen Davis. The play was directed by William A. Brady, and also starred his daughter, Alice Brady, as well as Tony Award-winning actor John Cromwell From 1915 through 1930 he would appear over a dozen times on the Great White Way, with some of his more notable plays being An American Tragedy, taken from the best-selling novel of the same name by Theodore Dreiser, and Holiday, produced and directed by Arthur Hopkins.

During the late 1910s, and through the 1920s, Walker would combine his stage career with appearances in several films, having mostly starring or featured roles over half a dozen. His debut film performance would be in the film American – That's All (1917), in which he starred alongside Jack Devereaux and Winifred Allen. He appeared in his last Broadway production in 1930, with a featured role in Rebound, written by Academy Award winner, Donald Ogden Stewart. In 1931, Walker would devote his acting energies to the big screen, appearing in over 75 films throughout the rest of the decade. In one of his first films during this decade, he would reprise his role of Henry Jaffrey in the film version of Rebound, which starred Ina Claire, Robert Ames and Myrna Loy.

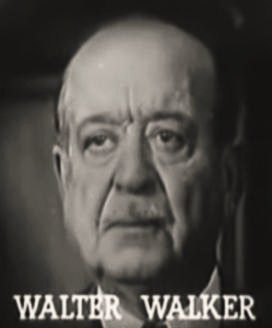
Walter Walker in Sons of Steel (1934)

Walker appeared in over 40 feature films during his career, mostly in supporting or smaller roles. Some of the more notable films in which he had either a featured or supporting role included 1933's Flying Down to Rio, starring Dolores del Río, and which featured the first on-screen pairing of Fred Astaire and Ginger Rogers; the original version of Imitation of Life in 1934, starring Claudette Colbert and Warren William; 1935's version of Magnificent Obsession, starring Irene Dunne and Robert Taylor (in which Walker had a small role); the Mae West vehicle Go West, Young Man in 1936, and as Benjamin Franklin in the 1938 film, Marie Antoinette, starring Norma Shearer and Tyrone Power. He would reprise the role of Franklin for the 1938 short, The Declaration of Independence. Walker's final screen appearance in a feature film was in a supporting role in The Cowboy and the Lady, starring Gary Cooper and Merle Oberon in 1938.

Walker died of pneumonia at age 83 on December 4, 1947, in St. Francis Hospital in Honolulu, Hawaii, where he had been visiting his daughter and son-in-law.

== Filmography ==
(Per AFI database)

- American – That's All (1917)
- Her Excellency, the Governor (1917)
- In Again, Out Again (1917)
- Blackbirds (1920)
- The Chicken in the Case (1921)
- The Darling of the Rich (1922)
- So's Your Old Man (1926)
- The Great Power (1929)
- Reaching for the Moon (1930)
- Paid (1930)
- The Common Law (1931)
- Rebound (1931)
- A Tailor Made Man (1931)
- New Adventures of Get Rich Quick Wallingford (1931)
- Annabelle's Affairs (1931)
- Possessed (1931)
- Two Seconds (1932)
- Life Begins (1932)
- You Said a Mouthful (1932)
- Blessed Event (1932)
- The Conquerors (1932)
- American Madness (1932)
- Two Against the World (1932)
- Letty Lynton (1932)
- The Rich Are Always with Us (1932)
- The Kid from Spain (1932)
- No Man of Her Own (1932) as Mr. Morton
- The Mouthpiece (1932)
- Madame Racketeer (1932)
- Fireman Save My Child (1932)
- Tomorrow and Tomorrow (1932)
- The Last Mile (1932)
- The Woman in Room 13 (1932)
- I Loved a Woman (1933)
- The House on 56th Street (1933)
- Female (1933)
- I'm No Angel (1933)
- Hard to Handle (1933)
- The Great Jasper (1933)
- I Love That Man (1933)
- Our Betters (1933)
- Jennie Gerhardt (1933)
- Mary Stevens, M.D. (1933)
- Hello, Sister! (1933)
- Sitting Pretty (1933)
- The Billion Dollar Scandal (1933)
- Flying Down to Rio (1933)
- From Hell to Heaven (1933)
- Gabriel Over the White House (1933)
- Strange Wives (1934)
- Babbitt (1934)
- I Believed in You (1934)
- The Man Who Reclaimed His Head (1934)
- Bedside (1934)
- The Secret Bride (1934)
- Mrs. Wiggs of the Cabbage Patch (1934)
- Sons of Steel (1934)
- Midnight Alibi (1934)
- The Count of Monte Cristo (1934)
- Sadie McKee (1934)
- You Can't Buy Everything (1934)
- The Gay Bride (1934)
- Against the Law (1934)
- Dangerous (1935)
- While the Patient Slept (1935)
- Front Page Woman (1935)
- The Great Hotel Murder (1935)
- Orchids to You (1935)
- She Couldn't Take It (1935)
- Thanks a Million (1935)
- No More Ladies (1935)
- Age of Indiscretion (1935)
- One New York Night (1935)
- Go West, Young Man (1936)
- Public Enemy's Wife (1936)
- Magnificent Obsession (1936)
- Yours for the Asking (1936)
- Everybody's Old Man (1936)
- Nothing Sacred (1937)
- Let Them Live (1937)
- The Women Men Marry (1937)
- Marie Antoinette (1938)
- There Goes My Heart (1938)
- The Cowboy and the Lady (1938)
