= Forrest Robinson =

American actor (1858–1924)

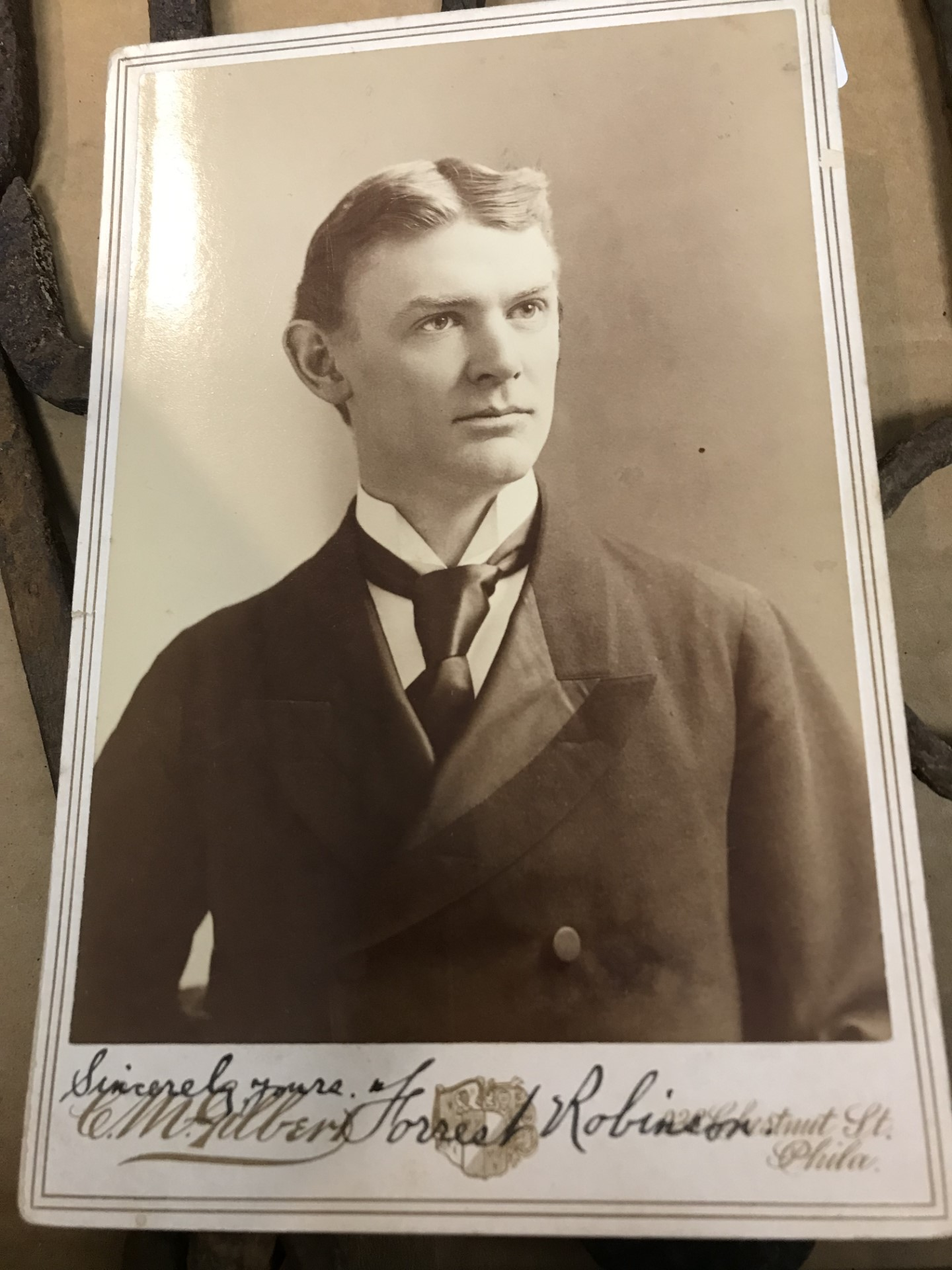
- Black-and-white portrait photograph of Forrest Robinson from studio of C. M. Galbert located on Cherry St. in Philadelphia, date unknown
- Born: 1858
- Died: January 6, 1924 (aged 65–66)
- Occupation: Actor
- Spouse: Mabel Bert

Forrest Robinson (1858 – January 6, 1924) was an American stage and silent era actor. He was a leading man at the Boston Museum Theater and acted in numerous theatrical productions in New York. He has also appeared in numerous films.

Robinson was in the Broadway productions Sag Harbor (play) (by James A. Herne and with Lionel Barrymore) at the Republic Theatre in 1900; Fortune-Hunter (by Winchell Smith and with John Barrymore) in 1909 at the Gaiety Theatre; The Master of the House at the 39th Street Theatre in 1912; John Cort's The Iron Door in 1913; and Philip Moeller's production of Molière in 1919 at the Liberty Theatre. Robinson toured London's West End in 1914 with Smith's Fortune-Hunter. The critic, Boyle Lawrence, described Robinson's performance in the Pall Mall Magazine Mr. Forrest Robinson, as an inventor, acted charmingly. Without any trace of effort, he projected a real, lovable personality over the footlights.

Robinson's silent film career included starring with Winifred Allen in From Two to Six (1918). His role in Tess of the Storm Country was described in the New York Times saying he '"gives the character of simplicity to Tess's father".

Robinson was married to the actress Mabel Bert.

== Theater ==
- Love Finds the Way (1896)
- Sag Harbor (1900)
- Fortune-Teller (1909)
- The Master of the House (1912)
- The Iron Door (1913)
- East Meets West (1918)
- Molière (1919)

== Filmography ==
- The House of a Thousand Candles (1915) as Bates
- The Dawn of a Tomorrow (1915) as Sir Oliver Holt
- The Mating (1918) as Mr. Fane
- Little Miss Hoover (1918) as Colonel William Craddock
- Just a Woman (1918) as Judge Van Brink
- From Two to Six (1918)
- The Hidden Truth (1919)
- His House in Order (1920)
- Tol'able David (1921) as Grandpa Hatburn
- Tess of the Storm Country (1922) as Orn 'Daddy' Skinner
- Adam's Rib (1923) as Kramer
- Ashes of Vengeance (1923) as Father Paul
- Souls for Sale (1923) as Rev. John Steddon, Mem's father
- When a Man's a Man as The Dean
