= In Again, Out Again =

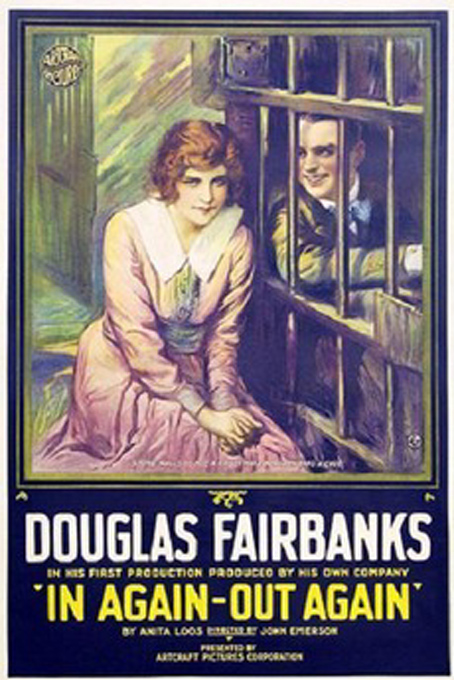
- Theatrical poster
- Directed by: John Emerson
- Screenplay by: Anita Loos
- Produced by: Douglas Fairbanks
- Starring: Douglas Fairbanks; Arline Pretty; Walter Walker; Arnold Lucy; Helen Greene; Homer Hunt; Albert Parker
- Cinematography: Arthur Edeson
- Production company: Douglas Fairbanks Pictures
- Distributed by: Artcraft Pictures
- Release date: April 30, 1917
- Running time: 50 minutes
- Country: United States
- Language: Silent (English intertitles)

In Again, Out Again is a 1917 American silent comedy film directed by John Emerson and written by Anita Loos. The film stars Douglas Fairbanks, Arline Pretty, Walter Walker, Arnold Lucy, Helen Greene, Homer Hunt, and Albert Parker. The film, that has 5 reels, was released on April 30, 1917, by Artcraft Pictures.

== Plot ==
Teddy is young man who drowns his sorrows in strong drink after being jilted by his girl. His drunkenness gets him thrown in jail, where he falls in love with the jailer's daughter, Janie. When released, the young man tries everything to get back into the jail - though when he is mistaken for an anarchist bomber, he finds himself facing not just jail, but execution.

== Cast ==
- Douglas Fairbanks as Teddy Rutherford
- Arline Pretty as Janie Dubb
- Walter Walker as Sheriff Dubb
- Arnold Lucy as Amos Jennings
- Helen Greene as Pacifica Jennings
- Homer Hunt as Henry Pinchit
- Albert Parker as Jerry
- Bull Montana as Quenton Auburn
- Ada Gilman as Teddy's Mother
- Frank Lalor as Pinkie
- Betty Tyrel as The Nurse
- W. C. Robinson as The Trustee
- Erich von Stroheim as Officer (uncredited)

== Preservation status ==
A print of In Again, Out Again is preserved by the Museum of Modern Art, New York.

== Reception ==
Paul Grant writing for Photoplay, praised the thematic depth of the Emerson-Loos productions and, comparing them with Balzac's Comédie Humaine, stated that, for instance, "while you laugh at In Again, Out Again you laugh also at the Pacifists".
