= The Long Trail (film) =

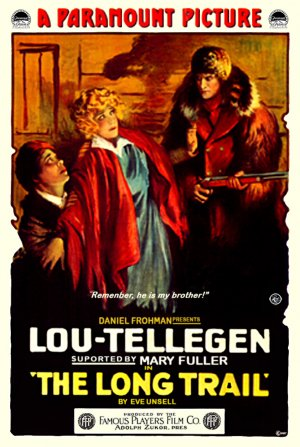
- Theatrical release poster
- Directed by: Howell Hansel
- Screenplay by: Eve Unsell
- Starring: Lou Tellegen; Mary Fuller; Winifred Allen; Sidney Bracey; Franklin Woodruff; Ferdinand Tidmarsh
- Cinematography: Lewis W. Physioc
- Production company: Famous Players–Lasky Corporation
- Distributed by: Paramount Pictures
- Release date: July 23, 1917
- Running time: 85 minutes (5100 feet)
- Country: United States
- Language: English

The Long Trail is a 1917 American drama silent film directed by Howell Hansel and written by Eve Unsell. The film stars Lou Tellegen, Mary Fuller, Winifred Allen, Sidney Bracey, Franklin Woodruff and Ferdinand Tidmarsh. The film was released on July 23, 1917, by Paramount Pictures.

== Plot ==
The plot description in the 11 August 1917 issue of Moving Picture World reads:

Andre Dubois is a French Canadian trapper. His little sister, Michette, and he keep house, and as she grows to womanhood he realizes that he must send her away to school. About the time she leaves, Andre makes the acquaintance of Louise Graham, niece of a prosperous fur-dealer who has come to the north country in search of rare pelts. Andrew is struck by her beauty, but is disturbed to learn that she is already engaged. However, Andre is kind to travelers and offers to show Louise and her party some of the beauties of the place. On this trip Louise and Andre are separated from the others, are caught in a snowstorm, and obliged to take refuge in his cabin.

The next morning Louise's fiancé breaks their engagement. Andre offers her the shelter of his name and home, and after a hasty wedding the two being a queer sort of double housekeeping arrangement, each keeping strictly to his and her particular room in Andre's shack.

In the meantime, Michette, away at boarding school, is seeing a great deal of young Paul Graham, Louise's brother, and when Andre goes to get her, leaving Louise in the care of an Indian woman, he finds that she has left the convent with Paul. While he is looking for her, Michette herself, a broken-winged butterfly, comes back to the little shack on "The Long Trail." Louise and the Indian woman care for her until she dies.

Andrew returns too late, but vows vengeance on the man, and tells the Mount Police all he knows of him. Paul becomes involved in a gambling fracas and shoots a man. The police are on his trail and a large reward is offered for him. In his flight he stumbles into the shack of Andre, and is overjoyed at finding his sister.

The climax comes when Andrew returns and recognizes him. Louise explains that it is her brother, and Andre relents, but after saving him from the police, who come to the shack looking for him, he provisions a sled and starts him on his way out of the country. It is just as they have parted was that the police find Paul and the evidence seems to implicate Andre. He is manacled and the party starts back to civilization, passing Andre's shack, where Louise, frantic at the delay, is waiting.

When she sees her brother dead and Andre, who she has come to love for the goodness and kind heart, manacled, she explains everything to the mounted policeman, offering her own hands for the manacles. Instead, however, the policeman puts them in Andre's, now free, and rides off down the long trail, leaving the two together at last.

== Cast ==
- Lou Tellegen as Andre Dubois
- Mary Fuller as Louise Graham
- Winifred Allen as Michette Dubois
- Sidney Bracey as Paul Graham
- Franklin Woodruff as Const. Joyce
- Ferdinand Tidmarsh
- Frank Farrington

== Production ==
Snow scenes for The Long Trail were shot on location at Saranac Lake.

== Preservation ==
With no holdings located in archives, The Long Trail is considered a lost film.
