= Roy Overbaugh =

American cinematographer

- Born: November 14, 1882; Chicago, Illinois, U.S.
- Died: 1966 (aged 83–84); Los Angeles, California, U.S.
- Occupation: Cinematographer

Roy F. Overbaugh (1882–1966) was an American cinematographer. He worked primarily in the United States often in association with the Canadian born director John S. Robertson, but also worked on several prestige films in Britain.

== Partial filmography ==
- Cassidy (1917)
- Grafters (1917)
- American - That's All (1917)
- Her Father's Keeper (1917)
- A Case at Law (1917)
- The Man Who Made Good (1917)
- On the Jump (1918)
- The Misleading Widow (1919)
- Erstwhile Susan (1919)
- Wanted: A Husband (1919)
- Dr. Jekyll and Mr. Hyde (1920)
- Away Goes Prudence (1920)
- A Dark Lantern (1920)
- 39 East (1920)
- Sentimental Tommy (1921)
- The Magic Cup (1921)
- Footlights (1921)
- Love's Boomerang (1922)
- The Spanish Jade (1922)
- Fury (1923)
- The Bond Boy (1923)
- The White Sister (1923)
- Classmates (1924)
- Romola (1924)
- Soul-Fire (1925)
- Shore Leave (1925)
- The Beautiful City (1925)
- Nell Gwyn (1926)
- Confetti (1927)
- The Return of the Rat (1928)
- The Bishop Murder Case (1930)
- Outside the Law (1930)
- Penrod and Sam (1931)
- Riot Squad (1932)
- Together We Live (1935)
