= The Knickerbocker Buckaroo =

1919 film

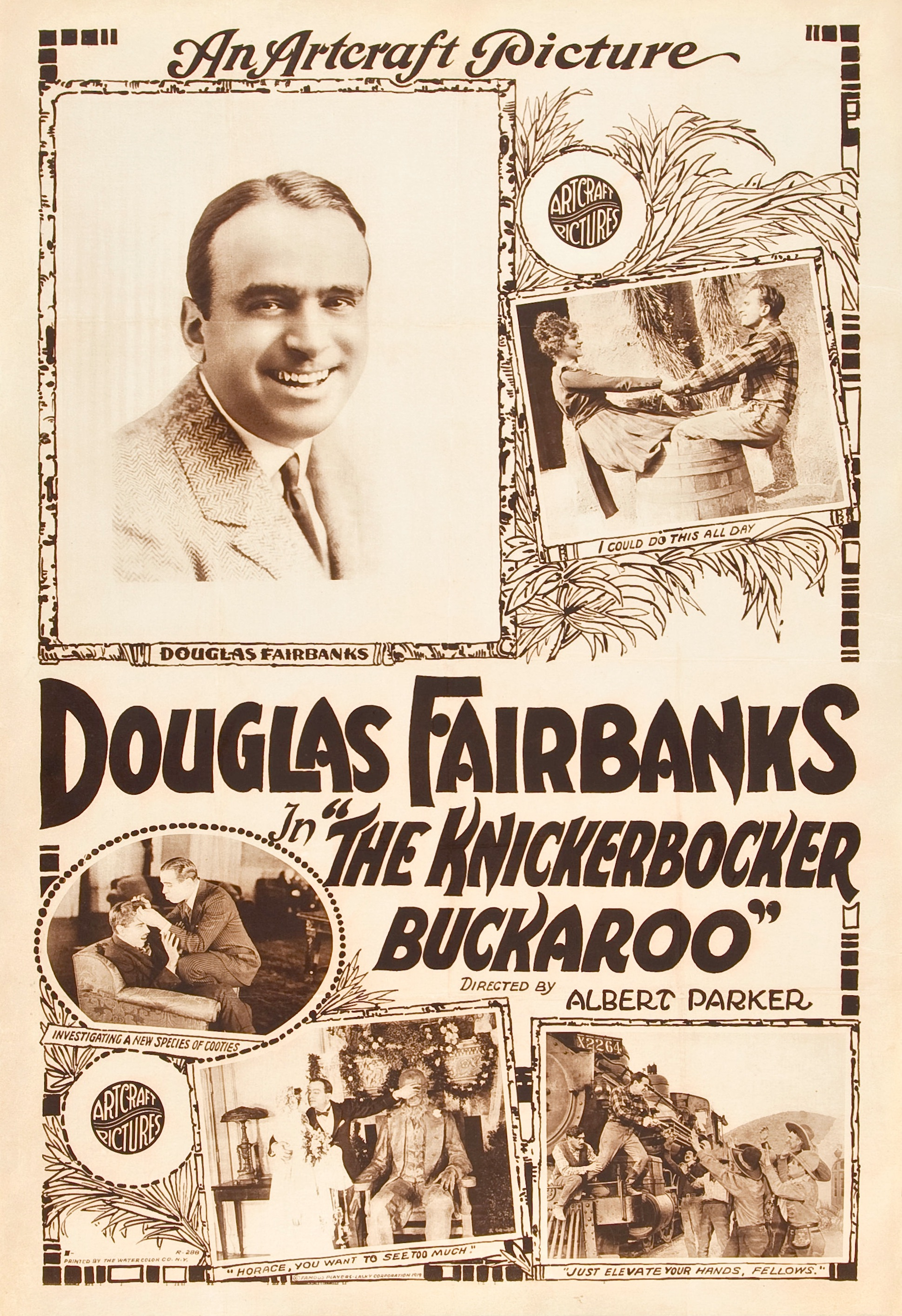
- Theatrical poster to The Knickerbocker Buckaroo
- Directed by: Albert Parker; Arthur Rosson (asst. director)
- Story by: Elton Thomas; Joseph Henabery; Frank Condon; Ted Reed
- Produced by: Douglas Fairbanks
- Starring: Douglas Fairbanks
- Cinematography: Hugh McClung; Glen MacWilliams
- Production company: Famous Players–Lasky/Artcraft Pictures Corporation
- Distributed by: Paramount Pictures
- Release date: May 18, 1919
- Running time: 77 minutes
- Country: United States
- Languages: Silent; English intertitles
- Budget: $264,000

The Knickerbocker Buckaroo is a 1919 American silent Western/romantic comedy film directed by Albert Parker and starring Douglas Fairbanks, who also wrote (under the pseudonym Elton Thomas) and produced the film. The Knickerbocker Buckaroo is now considered lost.

== Plot ==
Teddy Drake, a hedonistic New York City aristocrat who tries to change his selfish ways by heading to Sonora, Texas to carry out a campaign of altruism. Along the way, he is mistaken for a Mexican bandit and is pursued by a corrupt sheriff who is in pursuit of the bandit's hidden fortune.

== Cast ==
- Douglas Fairbanks as Teddy Drake
- Marjorie Daw as Rita Allison
- William A. Wellman as Henry (Wellman's debut in the film industry)
- Frank Campeau as Crooked Sheriff
- Edythe Chapman as Teddy's Mother
- Albert MacQuarrie as Manual Lopez
- Ernest Butterworth

== Production background ==
The Knickerbocker Buckaroo was Fairbanks' last film under his contract with Paramount Pictures. After this production, he worked exclusively at United Artists, a company he co-founded in 1919 with Mary Pickford, Charles Chaplin, and D. W. Griffith.

== See also ==
- List of lost films
