= Second Youth (1924 film) =

1924 film by Albert Parker

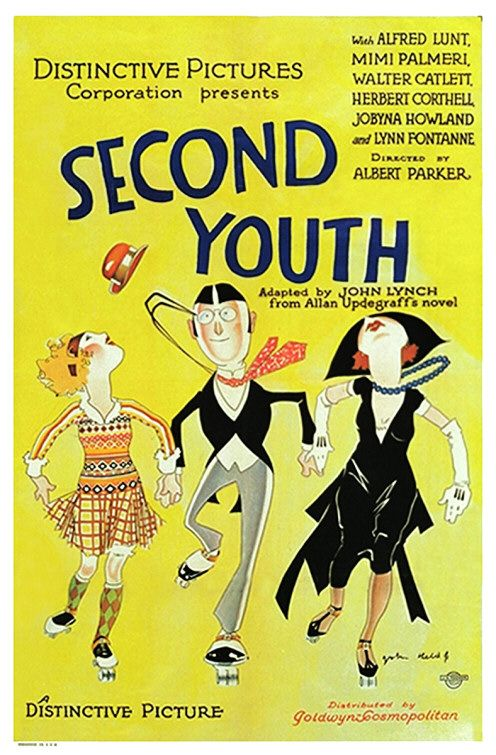
- Film poster
- Directed by: Albert Parker
- Written by: Allan Eugene Updegraff (novel); John Lynch (adaptation)
- Produced by: Distinctive Pictures Production
- Starring: Alfred Lunt; Lynn Fontanne
- Cinematography: J. Roy Hunt
- Edited by: Distinctive Pictures
- Distributed by: Goldwyn Pictures/Cosmopolitan
- Release date: April 6, 1924
- Running time: 6 reels (6,169 feet)
- Country: United States
- Language: Silent (English intertitles)

Second Youth is a 1924 American silent romantic comedy film produced by Distinctive Pictures (George Arliss) and distributed through Goldwyn Pictures. The film is one of the few and rare silent appearances of Broadway husband and wife team Alfred Lunt and Lynn Fontanne.

== Plot ==
As described in a film magazine review, Roland Francis, a timid silk salesman, is much sought after by the ladies, but he avoids them. A sub-deb, a stenographer, an extremely modern miss, and, worst of all, Mrs. Benson, a very experienced widow, are all trying to land him in the matrimonial net. The latter, having disposed of three husbands, wants to grab Francis for a fourth trial, and is naturally the hardest of the lot to evade. Anne Winton decides that a young woman has the right to flirt whenever and with whomever she pleases, and selects Francis as her victim. Anne, stimulated by the gibes of a sportive brother-in-law, invites Francis out to supper, takes him in Bohemian circles, lures him under the white lights, and gives him a heck of a time, generally speaking. The result is that he falls genuinely in love with her and not even his ingrained bashfulness is a strong enough barrier to save him from traveling the path to the marriage goal. Anne is brought to realize that she has started something she cannot stop. Still, Francis is hampered by other women and their indignant suitors. After many adventures, he eludes his pursuers and weds Anna.

== Cast ==
- Alfred Lunt as Roland Farwell Francis
- Dorothy Allen as Polly, a Maid
- Jobyna Howland as Mrs. Benson
- Lynn Fontanne as Rose Raynor
- Walter Catlett as John McNab
- Herbert Corthell as George Whiggam
- Margaret Dale as Mrs. Twombly
- Mona Palma as Ann Winton (credited as Mimi Palmeri)
- Winifred Allen as Phoebe Barney
- Charles Lane as Weeks Twombly (credited Charles Willis Lane)
- Lumsden Hare as James Remmick
- Mickey Bennett as Willie, Mrs. Benson's Son
- Faire Binney as Lucy Remmick
- Hugh Huntley as Harley Forbes

== Preservation ==
Prints of Second Youth are held in the collections of Cinematheque Royale de Belgique in Brussels and the Library of Congress.
