= The Food Gamblers =

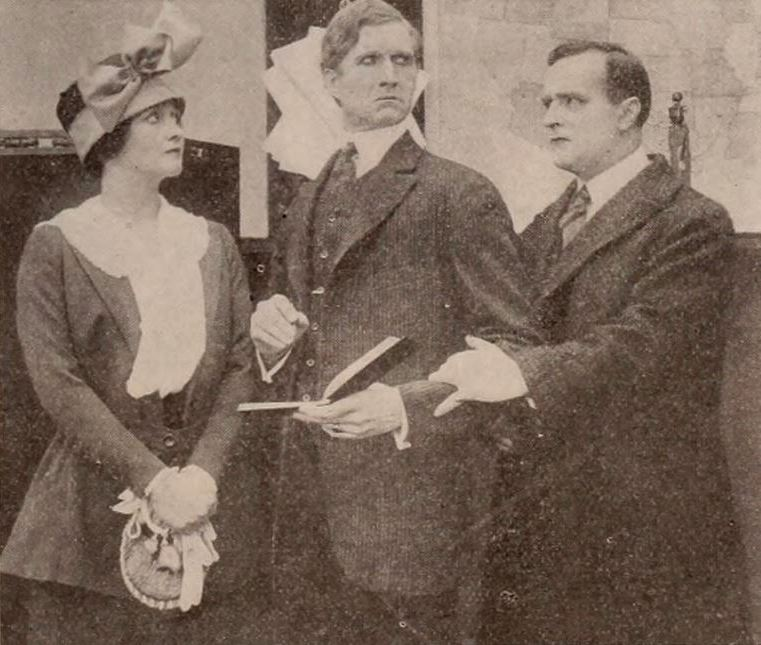
- Still with Hedda Hopper, Russell Simpson and unidentified actor
- Directed by: Albert Parker
- Written by: Robert Shirley
- Produced by: Triangle Film Corporation
- Starring: Wilfred Lucas; Russell Simpson; Hedda Hopper (as Elda Millar)
- Cinematography: Roy Vaughn
- Distributed by: Triangle Distributing
- Release date: August 5, 1917
- Running time: 5 reels
- Country: United States
- Language: Silent (English intertitles)

The Food Gamblers is a lost 1917 American silent drama film directed by Al Parker and starring Wilfred Lucas, Russell Simpson, and Elda Millar. The production was supervised by Allan Dwan. The plot involves the manipulation of the prices of food and other goods, similar to the inflation experienced at the time of the American entry into World War I.

== Plot ==
As described in a film magazine, June Justice (Hopper), a reporter on the Globe, is given an assignment to expose the food gamblers and find out who is responsible for the high price for food. She meets Henry Havens, president of the food gamblers' trust, and one of the richest commissions men as well as the meanest. June and Henry find themselves falling in love, but because he will not make restitution for his grafting, June does all in her power to expose his methods. Henry is attacked by an employee that he had fired for stealing, and is thrown into a discarded ice box. He is left several days without food and for the first time appreciates what it means to be hungry. After he is released and regains his strength, he joins the fight against the manipulation of food prices and works for the passage of legislation which will provide for state distribution.

At the end of the film, there was an exhortation for the public to contact their congressman for the passage of a state distribution of food bill.

== Cast ==
- Wilfred Lucas - Henry Havens
- Hedda Hopper - June Justice (credited as Elda Millar)
- Mac Barnes - Police Inspector
- Russell Simpson - Samuel Sloane
- Jack Snyder - Dopey Benny
- Eduardo Ciannelli - The Italian
- Josephine Myers - Little Girl

== See also ==
- Food and Fuel Control Act (similar to that described in the film)
