= A Successful Failure (1917 film) =

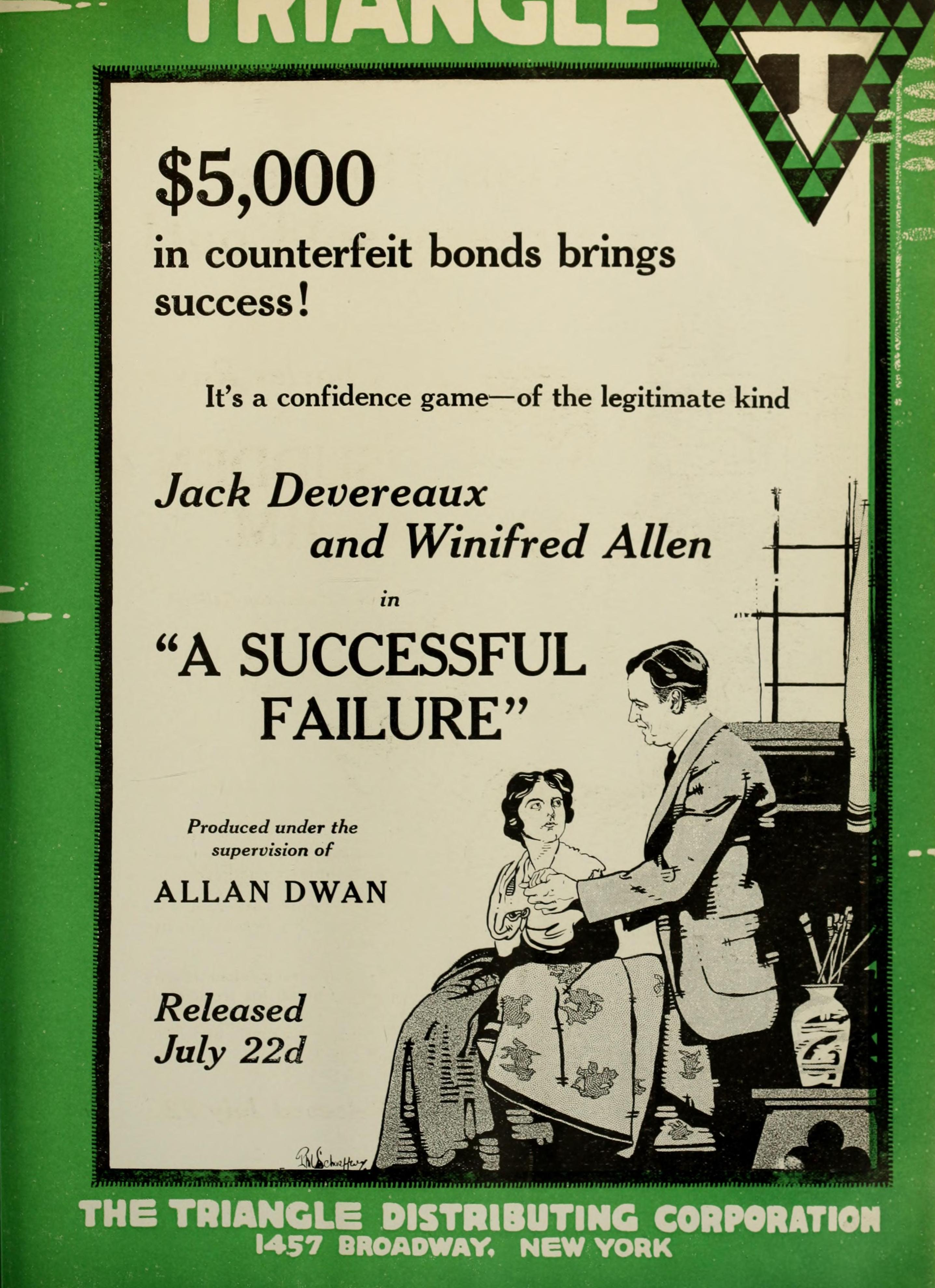
- Advertisement
- Directed by: Arthur Rosson
- Starring: Jack Devereaux; Winifred Allen; George Senaut
- Production company: Triangle Film Corporation
- Distributed by: Triangle Distributing
- Release date: July 22, 1917
- Running time: 50 minutes
- Country: United States
- Languages: Silent; English intertitles

A Successful Failure is a 1917 American silent comedy film directed by Arthur Rosson and starring Jack Devereaux, Winifred Allen and George Senaut. It was produced under the supervision of Allan Dwan.

== Selected cast ==
- Jack Devereaux
- Winifred Allen
- George Senaut

== Bibliography ==
- Robert B. Connelly. The Silents: Silent Feature Films, 1910-36, Volume 40, Issue 2. December Press, 1998.
