= For Valour (1917 film) =

1917 film

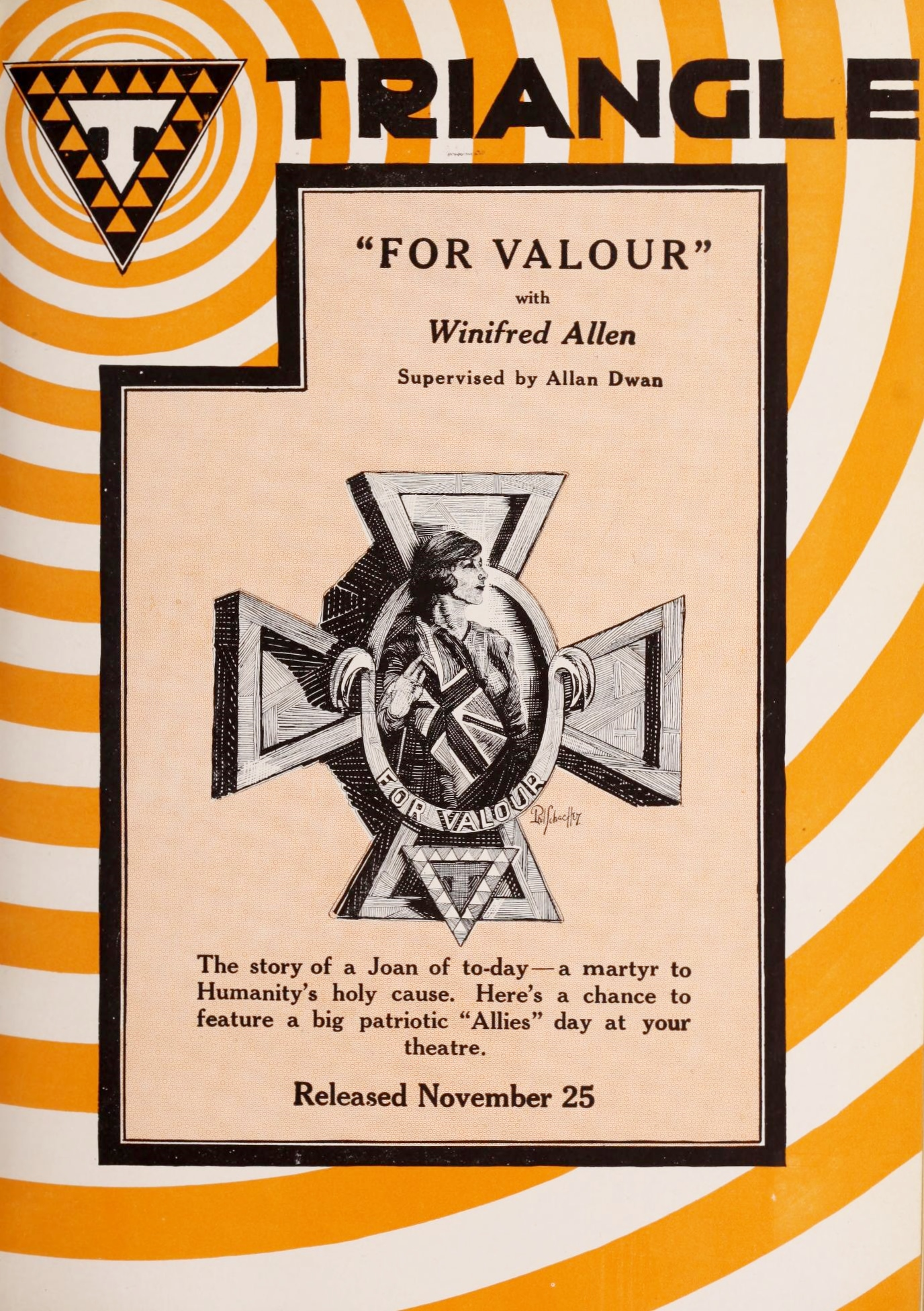
- Directed by: Albert Parker
- Written by: Robert Shirley
- Based on: Melia No-good by I.A.R. Wylie
- Produced by: Allan Dwan
- Starring: Winifred Allen; Richard Barthelmess; Mabel Ballin
- Cinematography: Roy Vaughn
- Production company: Triangle Film Corporation
- Distributed by: Triangle Distributing
- Release date: November 25, 1917
- Running time: 50 minutes
- Country: United States
- Languages: Silent; English intertitles

For Valour is a lost 1917 American silent war drama film directed by Albert Parker and starring Winifred Allen, Richard Barthelmess and Mabel Ballin. The film was produced and distributed by Triangle Films and shot at the company's New York studios. It was based on a short story by I.A.R. Wylie which originally appeared in the Good Housekeeping magazine.

== Synopsis ==
Canada, 1917. After discovering that her brother has stolen cash from his employer, his sister Melia steals money from the star of the theatre where she works. She pays off his debts but in exchange he agrees to enlist in the Canadian Army and fight in World War I. Melia is then arrested and send to prison for theft, and is disowned by her father, after refusing to explain why she took the money. When her brother returns home from France minus an arm but bearing the Victoria Cross he has been awarded for bravery, she feels the sacrifice she has made has been worth it.

== Cast ==
- Winifred Allen as Melia Nobbs
- Richard Barthelmess as Henry Nobbs
- Henry Weaver as Ambrose Nobbs
- Mabel Ballin as Alice Davis

== Bibliography ==
- Lombardi, Frederic . Allan Dwan and the Rise and Decline of the Hollywood Studios. McFarland, 2013.
