= Shifting Sands (1918 film) =

1918 film

- Directed by: Albert Parker
- Written by: Charles T. Dazey
- Starring: Gloria Swanson
- Cinematography: Pliny Horne
- Distributed by: Triangle Film Corporation
- Release date: August 1, 1918
- Running time: 5 reels
- Country: United States
- Language: Silent (English intertitles)

Shifting Sands is a 1918 American silent drama film directed by Albert Parker and starring Gloria Swanson. Prints of the film are held by the George Eastman Museum Motion Picture Collection and in private collections, and Shifting Sands has been released on DVD.

== Plot ==
As described in a film magazine, Marcia Grey (Swanson), a struggling artist, is accused of theft by Heinrich Von Holtz, and is sent to Blackwell's Island for ninety days. Out in the world again, she joins the Salvation Army. John Stanford (King), a wealthy philanthropist, gives an outing to poor children in her care. He tells her that he loves her and they are married. Five years of married life pass and the Great War breaks out. Stanford becomes a secret service agent. Heinrich Von Holtz, now a spy, visits the Stanford home in the guise of an Englishman. He recognizes Mrs. Stanford and tells her that she must obtain a government document from her husband or be exposed. She consents and goes with him to the enemy headquarters, carrying the document. The document proves spurious and Marcia, laughingly defiant, declares she would not betray her country for any price. Secret service men break in just as Mrs. Stanford's life is threatened. John Stanford, who had been compelled to suspect his wife of treachery and infidelity, learns that she has been in the secret service as well as himself. The film ends with the couple reunited and Marcia holding her secret.

== Cast ==
- Gloria Swanson as Marcia Grey
- Joe King as John Stanford
- Harvey Clark as Henry Holt - Rent collector
- Leone Carton as Cora Grey
- Lillian Langdon as Mrs. Stanford
- Arthur Millett as Major Willis
