= Richard Rosson =

American actor and filmmaker

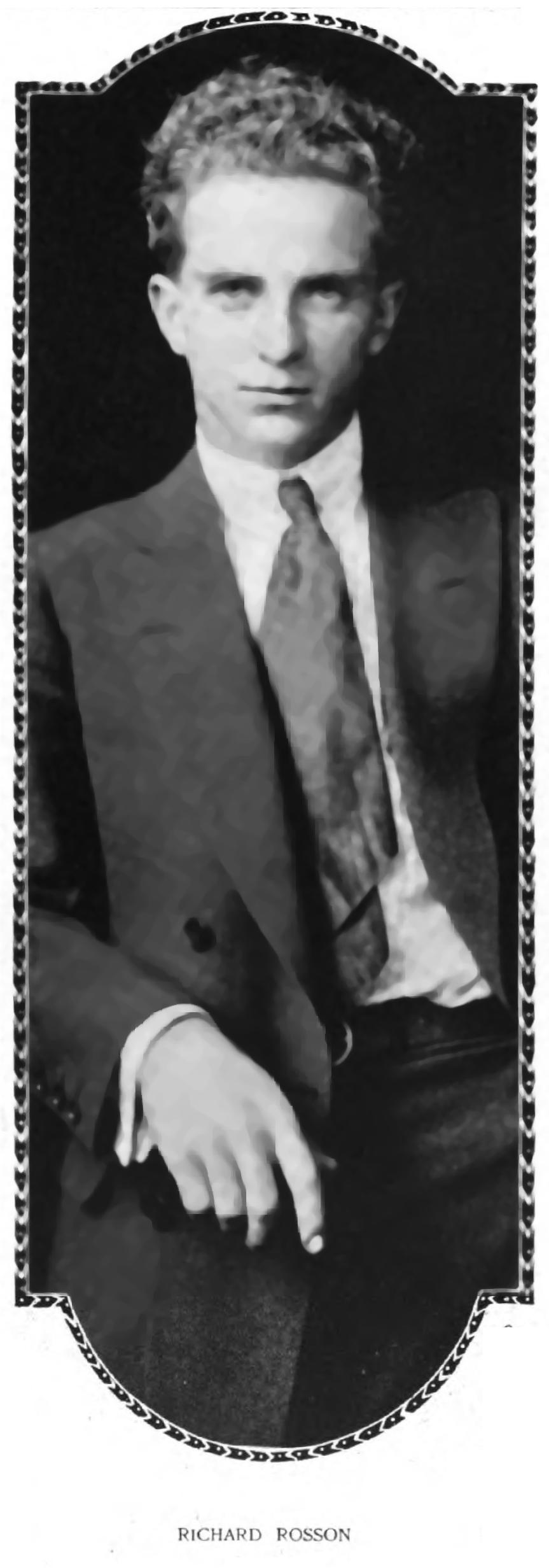
- Rosson, 1916
- Born: April 4, 1893; New York City, New York, U.S.
- Died: May 31, 1953 (aged 60); Pacific Palisades, California, U.S.
- Occupations: Film director, actor
- Years active: 1911–1943
- Spouse: Vera Sisson (m.1916)
- Relatives: Arthur Rosson (brother); Harold Rosson (brother); Helene Rosson (sister)

Richard Rosson (April 4, 1893 – May 31, 1953) was an American film director and actor. As an actor, he was known for the nearly 100 films he was in during the silent era. As a director, he directed the logging sequences in the 1936 film Come and Get It.

== Career ==
Rosson's first directorial effort was the 1926 American black and white silent comedy film Fine Manners, initially directed by Lewis Milestone for Famous Players–Lasky/Paramount Pictures. After an argument with actress Gloria Swanson, Milestone walked off the set, leaving the film to be completed by Rosson, who had picked up directorial tricks while working as an assistant director to Allan Dwan. The success of the film, being Rosson's first directorial effort since he co-directed Her Father's Keeper in 1917 with his brother Arthur Rosson, won him a long-term contract with Famous Players–Lasky.

== Personal life ==
Rosson was the younger brother of director Arthur Rosson; his younger sister Helene became a movie actress, and his younger brother Harold became a well-known director of photography who won the first Academy Award for color cinematography. Richard Rosson died from suicide from carbon monoxide poisoning at his home in Pacific Palisades, California at the age of 60. A year later, Rosson's wife, Vera Sisson, committed suicide by barbiturate overdose.

On May 1, 1939, Rosson was arrested on a charge of espionage in Vienna, Austria, with his wife and two other British nationals, by the Gestapo, allegedly for filming military hardware. They were held in solitary confinement for 34 days and released.

== Selected director filmography ==
- Her Father's Keeper (1917)
- Fine Manners (1926)
- Shootin' Irons (1927)
- The Wizard (1927)
- Road House (1928)
- Dead Man's Curve (1928)
- Scarface ("co-director" of retakes) (1932)
- West Point of the Air (1935)
- Hideaway (1937)
- Apache Trail (uncredited) (1942)
- The Getaway (uncredited) (1942)
- Corvette K-225 (1943)

== Selected actor filmography ==
- Richelieu (1914)
- The Pretty Sister of Jose (1915)
- The Old Cobbler (1916)
- Cassidy (1917)
- A Case at Law (1917)
- The Haunted House (1917)
- Madame Sphinx (1918)
- The Ghost Flower (1918)
- Alias Mary Brown (1918)
- Peggy Does Her Darndest (1919)
- The Poor Boob (1919)
- Playthings of Passion (1919)
- For Those We Love (1921)
- Beating the Game (1921)
- Her Face Value (1921)
- Always the Woman (1922)
