= Her Father's Keeper =

1917 film

Grafters
- Directed by: Arthur Rosson; Richard Rosson
- Written by: Robert Shirley
- Starring: Irene Howley; Jack Devereaux; Frank Currier
- Cinematography: Roy F. Overbaugh
- Production company: Fine Arts Film Company
- Distributed by: Triangle Distributing
- Release date: April 2, 1917
- Running time: 50 minutes
- Country: United States
- Languages: Silent; English intertitles

Her Father's Keeper is a 1917 American silent drama film directed by Arthur Rosson and Richard Rosson and starring Irene Howley, Jack Devereaux and Frank Currier.

== Cast ==
- Irene Howley as Claire Masters
- Jack Devereaux as Ralph Burnham
- Frank Currier as William Masters
- John Raymond as Business Manager
- John Hanneford as Detective
- Walter Bussel as Butler

== Preservation ==
With no holdings located in archives, Her Father's Keeper is considered a lost film.

== Bibliography ==
- Frederic Lombardi. Allan Dwan and the Rise and Decline of the Hollywood Studios. McFarland, 2013.
