= The Secret Code (film) =

1918 film

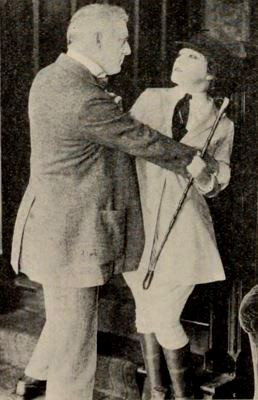
- J. Barney Sherry and Gloria Swanson
- Directed by: Albert Parker
- Written by: Catherine Carr (scenario)
- Based on: story by Adela Rogers St. Johns
- Starring: Gloria Swanson
- Cinematography: Pliny Horne
- Distributed by: Triangle Film Corporation
- Release date: September 8, 1918
- Running time: 5 reels
- Country: United States
- Language: Silent (English intertitles)

The Secret Code is a lost 1918 American silent drama film directed by Albert Parker and starring Gloria Swanson.

== Plot ==
As described in a film magazine, Senator John Calhoun Rand (Sherry), a confirmed old bachelor, marries Sally Carter (Swanson), a young small town woman many years his junior. Washington society is amazed as the Senator had been regarded as the prize catch of the capital. While the society women gossip, secret service agents trace a leak back to the Senator's home. Suspicion points to Mrs. Rand. An investigation proves that she is blameless and that a trusted matron, close to the confidence of the Senator, is an agent of the Kaiser's and has been learning the nation's secrets. Humiliated by the thought that he had mistrusted his wife, John apologizes and Sally takes him back.

== Cast ==
- Gloria Swanson as Sally Carter Rand
- J. Barney Sherry as Senator John Calhoun Rand
- Rhy Alexander as Lola Walling
- Leslie Stuart as Baron de Vorjeck (credited as Leslie Stewart)
- Joe King as Jefferson Harrow
- Dorothy Wallace as Mrs. Walker
- Lee Phelps as Towen Rage
