= The Haunted House (1917 film) =

1917 film

- Directed by: Albert Parker
- Produced by: Allan Dwan
- Starring: Winifred Allen; Richard Rosson; Albert Day
- Production company: Triangle Film Corporation
- Distributed by: Triangle Distributing
- Release date: September 20, 1917
- Running time: 50 minutes
- Country: United States
- Languages: Silent; English intertitles

The Haunted House is a 1917 American silent mystery film directed by Albert Parker and starring Winifred Allen, Richard Rosson and Albert Day.

== Cast ==
- Winifred Allen as Anne
- Richard Rosson as Jimmy
- Albert Parker as The Uncle
- Albert Day as Anne's Uncle
- Mac Barnes as The Sheriff
- Mabel Wright as Anne's Mother
- Eddie Kelly as The yegg

== Bibliography ==
- Lombardi, Frederic . Allan Dwan and the Rise and Decline of the Hollywood Studios. McFarland, 2013.
