= American – That's All =

1917 film

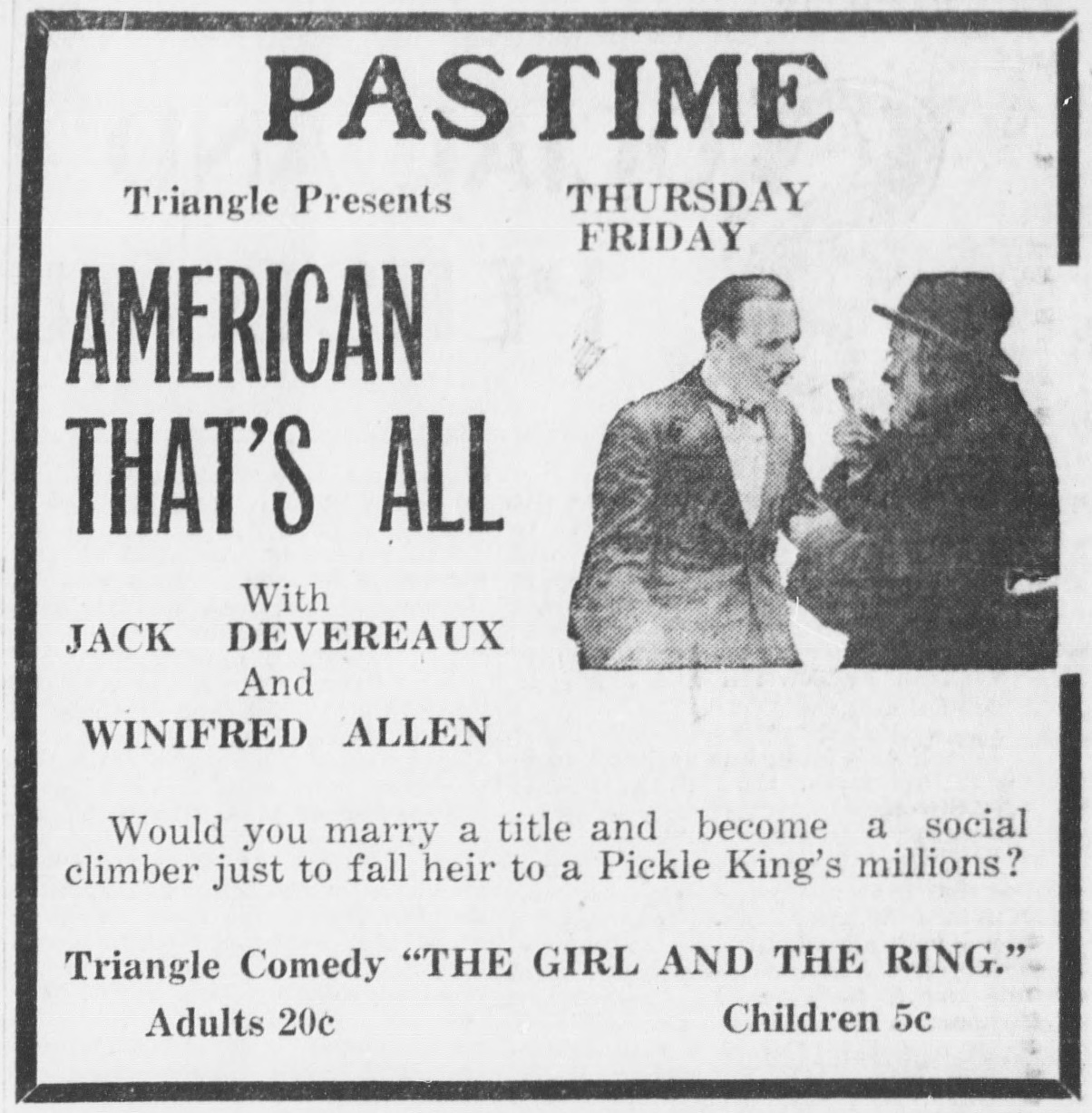
- Contemporary advertisement
- Directed by: Arthur Rosson
- Written by: Robert Shirley
- Starring: Jack Devereaux; Winifred Allen; Walter Walker
- Cinematography: Roy F. Overbaugh
- Production company: Triangle Film Corporation
- Distributed by: Triangle Distributing
- Release date: June 3, 1917
- Running time: 50 minutes
- Country: United States
- Languages: Silent; English intertitles

American – That's All is a lost 1917 American silent comedy film directed by Arthur Rosson and starring Jack Devereaux, Winifred Allen and Walter Walker.

== Cast ==
- Jack Devereaux as Monte Boggs
- Winifred Allen as Hazel Stanley
- Walter Walker as Father Boggs
- Blanche Davenport as Mother Boggs
- John Raymond as His Grace
- Charles Mussett as Butler
- Georges Renavent as Lounge Lizard
- Miss Cummins as Lady Vere de Vere

== Preservation ==
With no holdings located in archives, American - That's All is considered a lost film.

== Bibliography ==
- Phillips, Alastair & Vincendeau, Ginette. Journeys of Desire: European Actors in Hollywood. British Film Institute, 2006.
