= The Man Hater =

1917 film

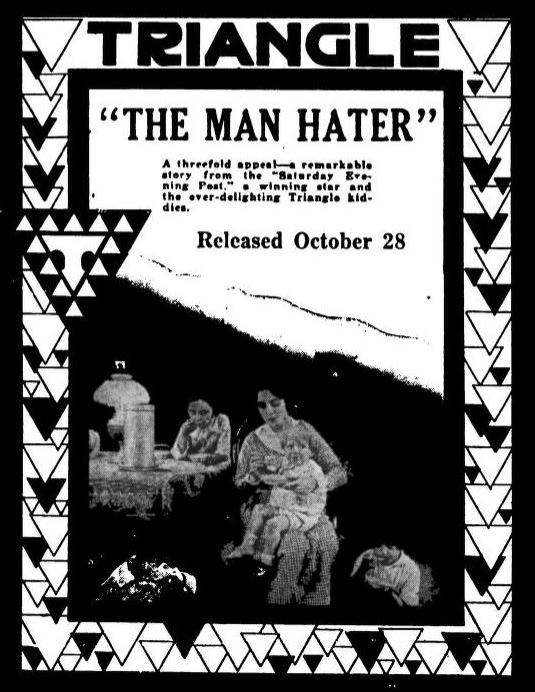
- Directed by: Albert Parker
- Written by: James Oliver Curwood (story); Mary Brecht Pulver
- Produced by: Allan Dwan; E.A. Martin
- Starring: Winifred Allen; Jack Meredith; Harry Neville
- Production company: Triangle Film Corporation
- Distributed by: Triangle Distributing
- Release date: September 2, 1917
- Running time: 50 minutes
- Country: United States
- Languages: Silent; English intertitles

The Man Hater is a 1917 American silent comedy drama film directed by Albert Parker and starring Winifred Allen, Jack Meredith and Harry Neville. Future star Ann Dvorak appeared in the film as a child actress.

== Cast ==
- Winifred Allen as Phemie Sanders
- Jack Meredith as Joe Stull
- Harry Neville as Phemie's father
- Jessie Shirley as Phemie's mother
- Marguerite Gale as Lucy Conyer
- Robert Vivian as The Doctor
- Ann Dvorak as Phemie's little sister

== Bibliography ==
- Lombardi, Frederic . Allan Dwan and the Rise and Decline of the Hollywood Studios. McFarland, 2013.
