= Madame Sphinx =

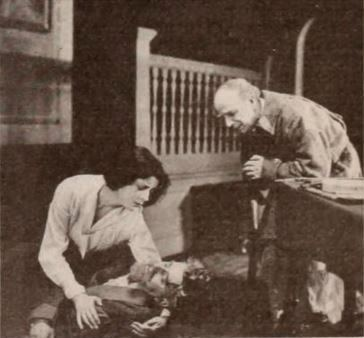
- a scene in the film
- Directed by: Thomas N. Heffron
- Written by: Lanier Bartlett; Raymond L. Schrock
- Produced by: Triangle Film Corporation
- Starring: Alma Rubens
- Cinematography: C. H. Wales
- Distributed by: Triangle Distributing
- Release date: June 9, 1918
- Running time: 5 reels
- Country: USA
- Language: Silent..English titles

Madame Sphinx is a lost 1918 silent film mystery directed by Thomas N. Heffron and starring Alma Rubens. It was produced by the Triangle Film Corporation.

== Cast ==
- Alma Rubens - Celeste
- Wallace MacDonald - Andre Du Bois
- Eugene Burr - Raoul Laverne (*Gene Burr)
- Frank MacQuarrie - Henri Du Bois
- William Dyer - Guissert
- Richard Rosson - Dessin
- Betty Pearce - Lys
- Wilbur Higby - Chambre
- Arthur Millett - Beauchad
- John Lince - Louis
