= Ann Dvorak =

American actress (1911–1979)

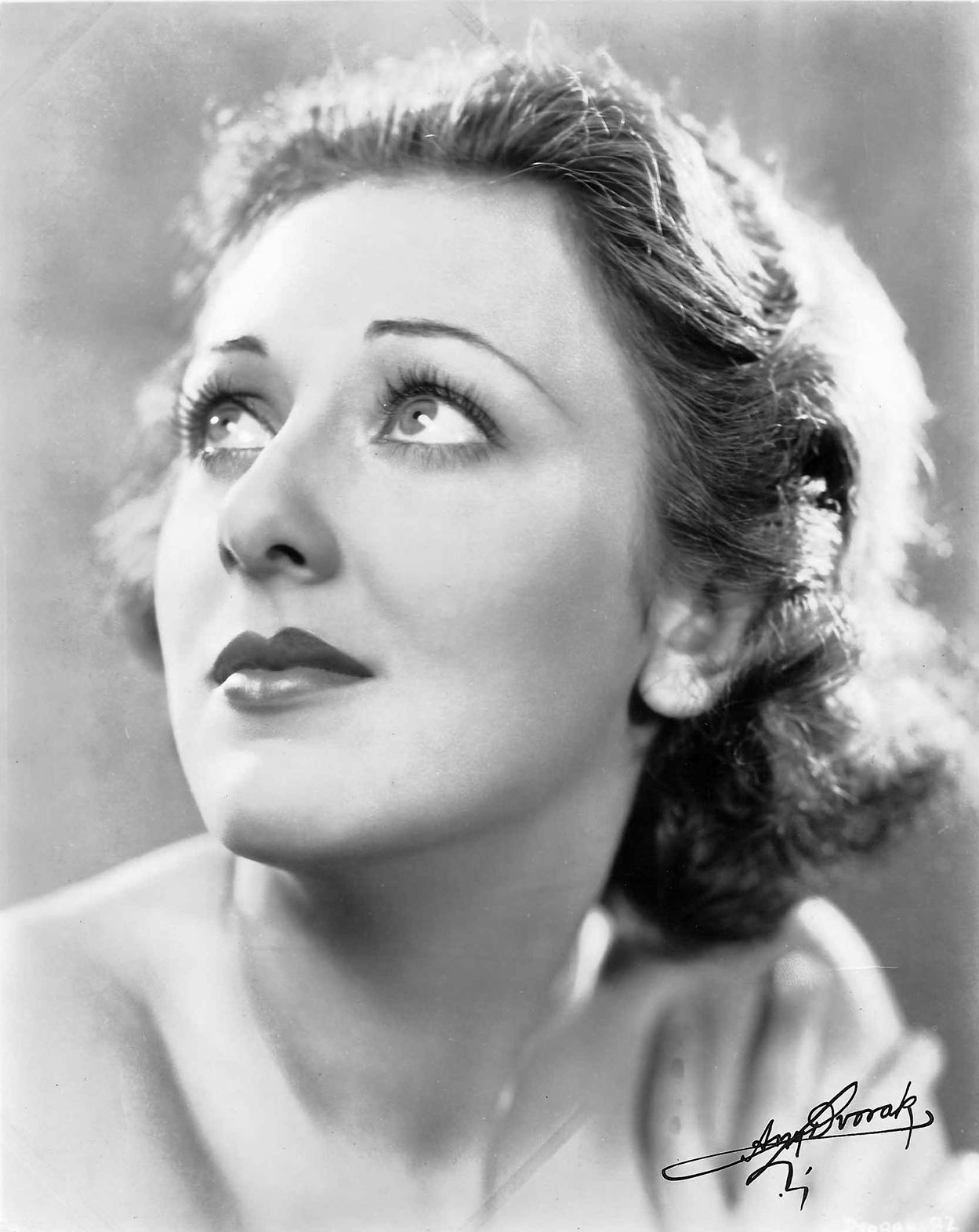
- Dvorak in 1940s
- Born: Anna McKim; August 2, 1911; New York City, U.S.
- Died: December 10, 1979 (aged 68); Honolulu, Hawaii, U.S.
- Education: St. Catherine's Convent; Page School for Girls
- Occupation: Actress
- Years active: 1916–1952
- Spouses: Leslie Fenton (m. 1932; div. 1945) Igor Dega (m. 1947; div. 1951) Nicholas Wade (m. 1951; died 1975)
- Parents: Edwin McKim; Anna Lehr

Ann Dvorak (born Anna McKim; August 2, 1911 – December 10, 1979) was an American stage and film actress.

Asked how to pronounce her adopted surname, she told The Literary Digest in 1936: "My fake name is properly pronounced vor'shack. The D remains silent. I have had quite a time with the name, having been called practically everything from Balzac to Bickelsrock."

== Early years ==
Dvorak was the daughter and only child of silent film actress Anna Lehr and director Edwin McKim. While in New York, she attended St. Catherine's Convent. After moving to California, she attended Page School for Girls in Hollywood.

She made her film debut when she was five years old in the silent film version of Ramona (1916), credited as "Baby Anna Lehr." She continued in children's roles in The Man Hater (1917) and Five Dollar Plate (1920), but then stopped acting in films. Her parents separated in 1916 and divorced in 1920; she did not see her father again until 13 years later, when she made a public plea to the press to help her find him.

== Career ==
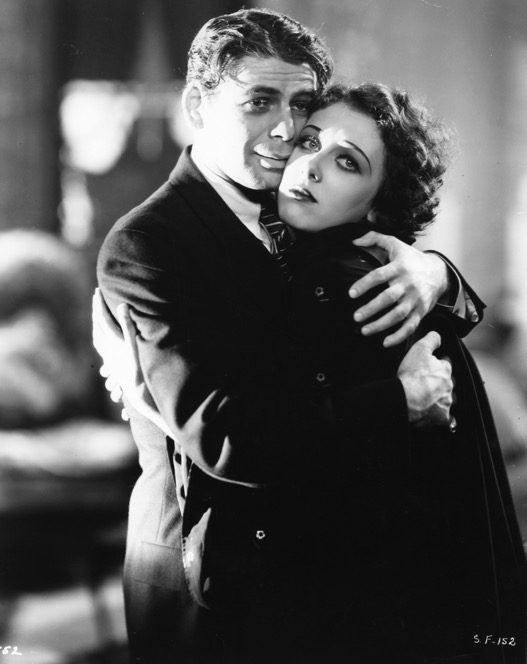
Paul Muni and Dvorak in Scarface (1932)

In the late 1920s, Dvorak worked as an assistant choreographer to Sammy Lee at MGM and gradually began to appear on film uncredited usually as a chorus girl or in bit parts. Her friend, actress Karen Morley, introduced her to millionaire movie producer Howard Hughes, who groomed her as a dramatic actress. She was a success in such pre-Code films as Scarface (1932) as Paul Muni's sister; in Three on a Match (1932) with Bette Davis and Joan Blondell as the doomed, unstable Vivian; in The Crowd Roars (1932) with James Cagney; and in Sky Devils (1932) opposite Spencer Tracy. Known for her style and elegance, she was a popular leading lady for Warner Bros. during the 1930s, and appeared in numerous contemporary romances and melodramas.

At age 19, Dvorak eloped with Leslie Fenton, her English co-star from The Strange Love of Molly Louvain (1932), and they married on March 17, 1932. They left for a year-long honeymoon in spite of her contractual obligations to the studio, which led to a period of litigation and pay disputes during which she discovered she was making the same amount of money as the boy who played her son in Three on a Match.

Dvorak filed a lawsuit against Warner Bros. concerning their suspension of her contract. Fenton and Dvorak struggled to afford life without Ann's weekly income of $1,500 therefore by December 1935 the pair had engaged with legal attorneys who had met with Warner Bros. legal department. By December 17, 1935, the official complaint for declaration relief was sent. It charged that the studios had "repeatedly refused to permit said actress to further perform any services whatsover" and has "wholly failed, neglected and refused to pay said artists any sums whatsoever." Warner Bros. officially lifted her suspension on January 27, 1936; however, the first court hearing was on 14 February 1936 and what followed was a series of questions surrounding her health and fitness to work. The court released her defeat on the conclusion that no breach of contract was committed.

She appeared as secretary Della Street to Donald Woods' Perry Mason in The Case of the Stuttering Bishop (1937). With her then-husband, Leslie Fenton, Dvorak traveled to England where she supported the war effort by working as an ambulance driver and acted in several British films. She appeared as a saloon singer in Abilene Town with Randolph Scott and Edgar Buchanan, released in 1946. The following year she adeptly handled comedy by giving an assured performance in Out of the Blue (1947). In 1948, Dvorak gave her only performance on Broadway in The Respectful Prostitute.

== Personal life ==
Dvorak's marriage to Fenton ended in divorce in 1946. In 1947, she married Igor Dega, a Russian dancer who danced with her briefly in The Bachelor's Daughters. The marriage ended two years later.

Dvorak retired from the screen in 1952, when she married her final husband, Nicholas Wade, to whom she remained married until his death in 1975. She had no children. In 1959, she and her husband moved to Hawaii, which she had always loved.

Several weeks before her death, she suffered severe stomach pains. She was diagnosed with terminal cancer. She died on December 10, 1979, aged 68, in Honolulu. She was cremated and her ashes scattered off Waikiki Beach.

== Legacy ==
Dvorak has a star on the Hollywood Walk of Fame at 6321 Hollywood Boulevard for her contribution to motion pictures. It was dedicated February 8, 1960.

== Filmography ==
=== Features ===
Year	Title	Role	Note
1916	Ramona	Ramona (age 4)	
1917	The Man Hater	Phemie's Little Sister	
1929	The Hollywood Revue of 1929	Herself – Chorus Girl	Uncredited
1929	So This Is College	Student	Uncredited
1929	It's a Great Life	Chorus Girl	Uncredited
1929	Devil-May-Care	Chorine	Uncredited
1930	Chasing Rainbows		
1930	The Woman Racket	Chorus Girl	Uncredited
1930	Lord Byron of Broadway	Chorus Girl	Uncredited
1930	Free and Easy	Chorine	Uncredited
1930	Children of Pleasure	Chorus Girl	Uncredited
1930	Estrellados	Chorine	Uncredited
1930	Our Blushing Brides	One of the 'Quartet' of Models with Tony	Uncredited
1930	Way Out West	Carnival Show Girl	Uncredited
1930	Good News	Student	Uncredited
1930	Doughboys	Chorine	Scenes deleted
1930	The March of Time	Chorus Girl	Uncredited
1930	Love in the Rough	Chorus Girl	Uncredited
1930	Madam Satan	Zeppelin Reveler	Uncredited
1930	War Nurse	Nurse in VA Hospital	Uncredited
1931	Dance, Fools, Dance	Chorus Girl	Uncredited
1931	A Tailor Made Man	Bit	Uncredited
1931	Just a Gigolo	Cafe Patron	Uncredited
1931	Politics	Rally Audience Extra	Uncredited
1931	Son of India	Village Dancer	Uncredited
1931	Stranger in Town	Marian Crickle	
1931	This Modern Age	Party Guest	Uncredited
1931	The Guardsman	Fan Saying 'There He Is'	Uncredited
1932	Sky Devils	Mary Way	
1932	Scarface	Francesca "Cesca" Camonte	
1932	The Crowd Roars	Lee Merrick	
1932	The Strange Love of Molly Louvain	Molly Louvain	
1932	Love Is a Racket	Sally Condon	
1932	Crooner	Judith 'Judy' Mason	
1932	Three on a Match	Vivian Revere	
1933	The Way to Love	Madeleine	
1933	College Coach	Claire Gore	
1934	Massacre	Lydia	
1934	Heat Lightning	Myra	
1934	Side Streets	Marguerite Gilbert	
1934	Midnight Alibi	Joan Morley	
1934	Friends of Mr. Sweeney	Miss Beulah Boyd	
1934	Housewife	Nan	
1934	I Sell Anything	Barbara	
1934	Gentlemen Are Born	Susan Merrill	
1934	Murder in the Clouds	Judy	
1935	Sweet Music	Bonnie Haydon	
1935	G Men	Jean Morgan	
1935	Bright Lights	Fay Wilson	
1935	Dr. Socrates	Josephine Gray	
1935	Thanks a Million	Sally Mason	
1937	We Who Are About to Die	Miss Connie Stewart	
1937	Racing Lady	Ruth Martin	
1937	Midnight Court	Carol O'Neill	
1937	The Case of the Stuttering Bishop	Della Street	
1937	She's No Lady	Jerry	
1937	Manhattan Merry-Go-Round	Ann Rogers	
1938	Merrily We Live	Minerva Harlan	
1938	Gangs of New York	Connie Benson	
1939	Blind Alley	Mary	
1939	Stronger Than Desire	Eva McLain	
1940	Cafe Hostess	Jo	
1940	Girls of the Road	Kay Warren	
1942	This Was Paris	Ann Morgan	
1943	Squadron Leader X	Barbara Lucas	
1943	Escape to Danger	Joan Grahame	
1945	Flame of Barbary Coast	'Flaxen' Tarry	
1945	Masquerade in Mexico	Helen Grant	
1946	Abilene Town	Rita	
1946	The Bachelor's Daughters	Terry Wilson	
1947	Out of the Blue	Olive Jensen	
1947	The Private Affairs of Bel Ami	Claire Madeleine Forestier	
1947	The Long Night	Charlene	
1948	The Walls of Jericho	Belle Connors	
1950	Our Very Own	Mrs. Gert Lynch	
1950	A Life of Her Own	Mary Ashlon	
1950	The Return of Jesse James	Susan (Sue) Ellen Younger	
1950	Mrs. O'Malley and Mr. Malone	Connie Kepplar	
1951	I Was an American Spy	Mrs. Claire 'High Pockets' Phillips	
1951	The Secret of Convict Lake	Rachel Schaeffer	

=== Short subjects ===
- The Five Dollar Plate (1920)
- The Doll Shop (1929) as One of the Dolls (uncredited)
- Manhattan Serenade (1929) as Chorus Girl (uncredited)
- The Song Writers' Revue (1930) as Member of the Chorus (uncredited)
- The Flower Garden (1930) as Member of Chorus
- Pirates (1930) as Chorus Girl (uncredited)
- The Snappy Caballero (1931)
- A Trip Thru a Hollywood Studio (1935) as Herself (uncredited)
