= From Two to Six =

1918 film

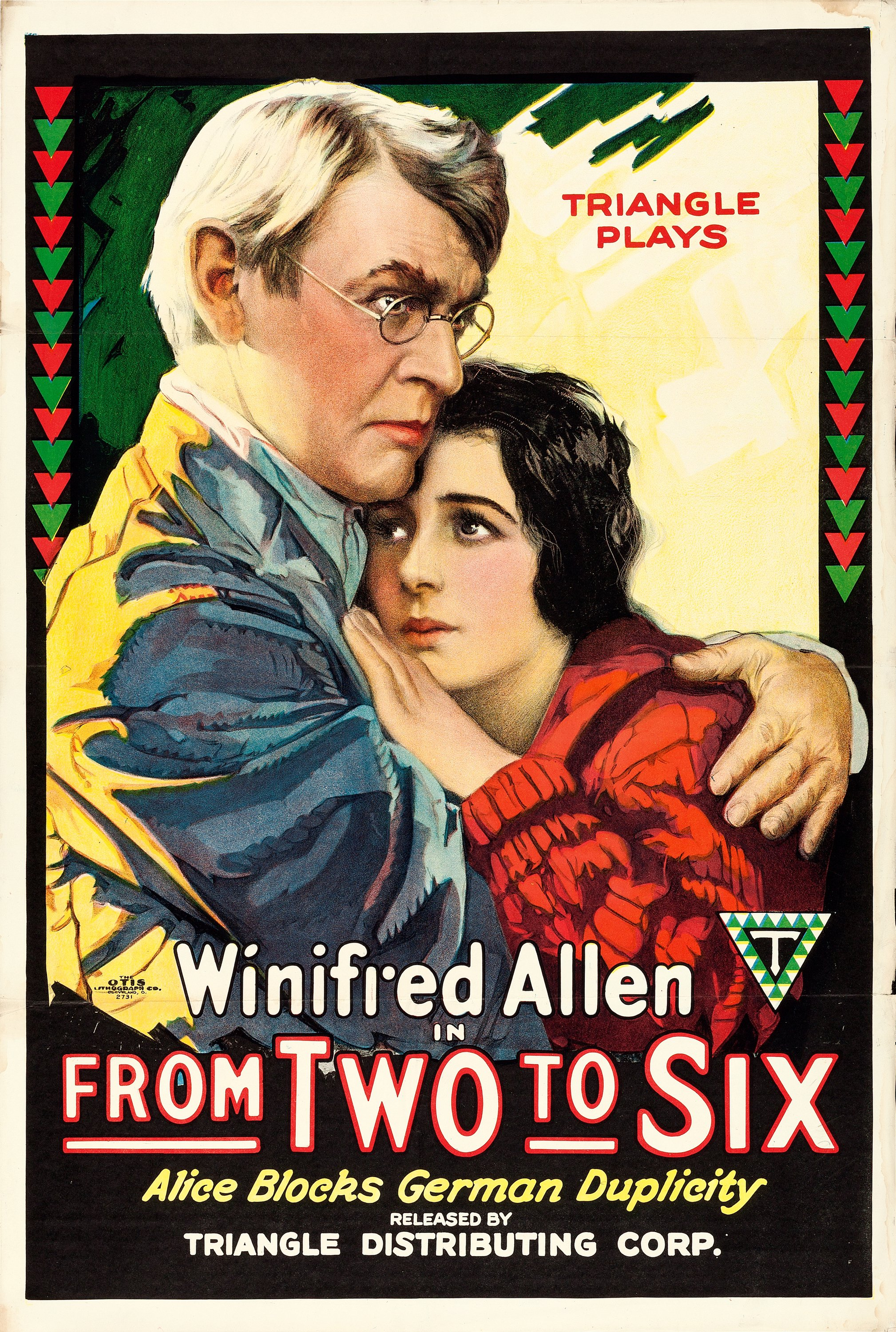
- Directed by: Albert Parker
- Based on: The Button Thief by Arthur Stringer
- Produced by: Allan Dwan
- Starring: Winifred Allen; Earle Foxe; Forrest Robinson
- Cinematography: Roy Vaughn
- Production company: Triangle Film Corporation
- Distributed by: Triangle Distributing
- Release date: February 17, 1918
- Running time: 50 minutes
- Country: United States
- Languages: Silent; English intertitles

From Two to Six is a 1918 American silent comedy drama film directed by Albert Parker and starring Winifred Allen, Earle Foxe and Forrest Robinson.

== Cast ==
- Winifred Allen as Alice Stevens
- Earle Foxe as Howard Skeele
- Forrest Robinson as John Stevens
- Robert Fischer as Baron Kuno Von Wiederholtz
- Margaret Greene as Madame Elsa
- Clarence Handyside as Richard Skeele
- Charles Wells as George Worth
- Madeline Marshall as Margaret Worth
- Amy Somers as French Maid
- Riley Hatch as House Detective

== Bibliography ==
- Connelly, Robert B. The Silents: Silent Feature Films, 1910-36, Volume 40, Issue 2. December Press, 1998.
