= Cassidy (film) =

1917 film

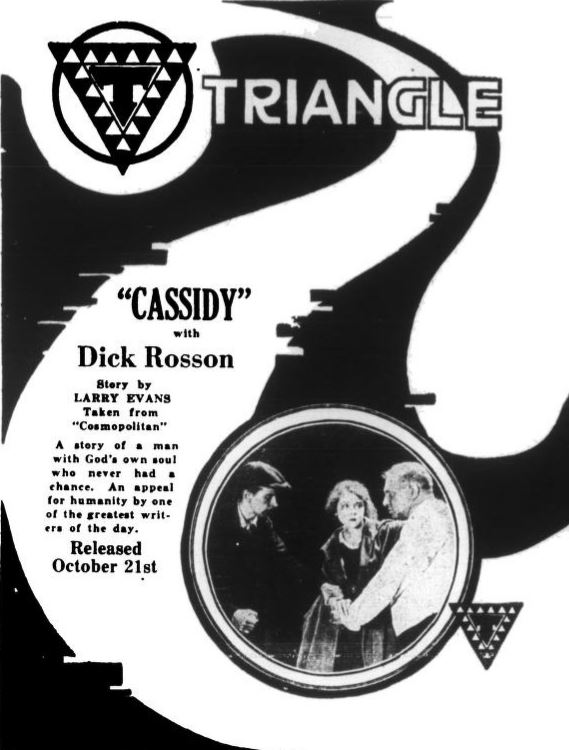
- Directed by: Arthur Rosson
- Written by: Larry Evans
- Starring: Richard Rosson; Frank Currier; Pauline Curley
- Cinematography: Roy F. Overbaugh
- Production company: Triangle Film Corporation
- Distributed by: Triangle Distributing
- Release date: October 21, 1917
- Running time: 50 minutes
- Country: United States
- Languages: Silent; English intertitles

Cassidy is a 1917 American silent drama film directed by Arthur Rosson and starring Richard Rosson, Frank Currier and Pauline Curley.

== Cast ==
- Richard Rosson as Cassidy
- Frank Currier as Dist. Atty. Grant
- Pauline Curley as Grant's Daughter
- Mac Alexander as Garvice
- Eddie Sturgis as The Bull
- John O'Connor as The Bartender

== Preservation ==
With no holdings located in archives, Cassidy is considered a lost film.

== Bibliography ==
- Robert B. Connelly. The Silents: Silent Feature Films, 1910-36, Volume 40, Issue 2. December Press, 1998.
