= Arthur Rosson =

English film director (1886–1960)

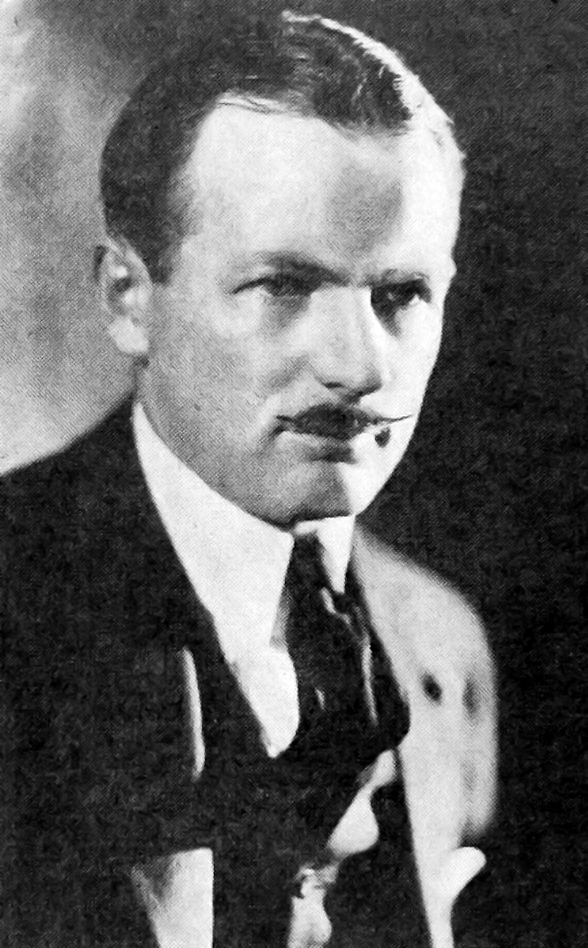
- Rosson in 1921
- Born: 24 August 1886; London, England
- Died: 17 June 1960 (aged 73); Los Angeles, California, U.S.
- Occupations: Film director, second unit director
- Years active: 1912–1960
- Spouse(s): Louise Irana Niedermeyer (divorced); Odetta M Bray (m.1940)
- Children: 3
- Relatives: Richard Rosson (brother); Harold Rosson (brother); Helene Rosson (sister)

Arthur Henry Rosson (24 August 1886 – 17 June 1960) was an English film director. From 1917 to 1948, Rosson directed 61 feature films (including co-direction of Red River). He also worked on many major films as a second unit director until 1960, particularly for Cecil B. DeMille.

== Biography ==
Arthur Rosson was born on 24 August 1886 in London, England. He was the first child born of a jockey horse trainer, Arthur Richard Rosson, and a French woman, Hellen Rochefort Rosson. Rosson came from a film-making family. His brother, Harold Rosson, was an Academy Award-nominated cinematographer and several other family members were involved in the early film industry. He was also the brother of silent film actress Helene Rosson and actor and director Richard Rosson.

Rosson graduated from Rogers High School in Newport, Rhode Island in 1902. Rosson was a stock-exchange clerk, who wanted to make a career for himself in film. He married Louise (Lucille) Irana Niedermeyer on 2 June 1912. At the time of their marriage, Louise was three months pregnant. After their first child was born, they moved to California. The couple later divorced.

Rosson began his career in film in 1917 as an assistant director and screenwriter. In 1920, Rosson collaborated with his brother Hal on the film Polly of the Storm Country. The film was shot on location at the Selig Zoo. He also worked with his brother again in 1922 on the film Garrison's Finish.

Throughout the 1920s, Rosson worked with Allan Dwan on his silent films throughout his career. Rosson wrote the scripts for Dwan's films Bloodhounds of the North and The Honor of the Mounted. While shooting them on Mt. Lowe in 1913, Rosson got lost in a canyon with Lon Chaney. Rosson also write The Picket Guard. He and his brother Dick were actors in the 1913 film Criminals. Rosson was the actual director of Cheating Cheaters, while Dwan oversaw the production; however, most reviews mentioned Dwan as the director Rosson also helped with staging Dwan's production of Soldiers of Fortune in 1919. Rosson again handles the duties of director for Dwan's film A Splendid Hazard that was produced in 1920.

Rosson later went to Britain to direct Ebb Tide and Women Who Pay in 1932. The films were produced by Paramount-British productions. Shortly after, in 1934 he directed Forbidden Territory He also worked as the second unit director of all of Cecil B. DeMille's films beginning in the 1930s. He died in 1960 and is buried in the Hollywood Forever Cemetery with other members of his family.

== Selected filmography ==
- The Spirit of the Flag (1913) script
- The Picket Guard (1913) script
- The Criminals (1913) script
- Bloodhounds of the North (1913) script
- The Gratitude of Wanda (1913)
- The Mystery of Yellow Aster Mine (1913)
- The Lie (1914) actor
- The Honor of the Mounted (1914) script
- Discord and Harmony (1914) script
- Panthea (1917)
- American – That's All (1917) director
- A Successful Failure (1917) director
- Cassidy (1917) director
- Grafters (1917) director
- Her Father's Keeper (1917) director
- The Man Who Made Good (1917) director
- A Case at Law (1917) director
- Headin' South (1918) director
- The Knickerbocker Buckaroo (1918)
- The Coming of the Law (1919) director
- Married in Haste (1919) director
- Soldiers of Fortune (1919) associate director
- Sahara (1919) director
- Polly of the Storm Country (1920) director
- Desert Blossoms (1921) director
- For Those We Love (1921) director
- The Fire Bride (1922) director
- The Satin Girl (1923) director
- Garrison's Finish (1923) director
- Condemned (1923) director
- The Measure of a Man (1924)
- The Burning Trail (1925) director
- The Fighting Demon (1925) director
- Tearing Through (1925) director
- The Meddler (1925) director
- You'd Be Surprised (1926)
- Stranded in Paris (1926)
- Set Free (1927)
- The Long Long Trail (1929)
- Women Who Play (1932)
- Ebb Tide (1932)
- Trailin' Trouble (1937)
- The Buccaneer (1938) second unit director
- Gone with the Wind (1939) second unit director
- North West Mounted Police (1940) second unit director
- The Story of Dr. Wassell (1944) second unit director
- Red River (1948) co-director
- Samson and Delilah (1949) unit director
- The Greatest Show on Earth (1952) unit director
- The Ten Commandments (1956) unit director
