= A Case at Law =

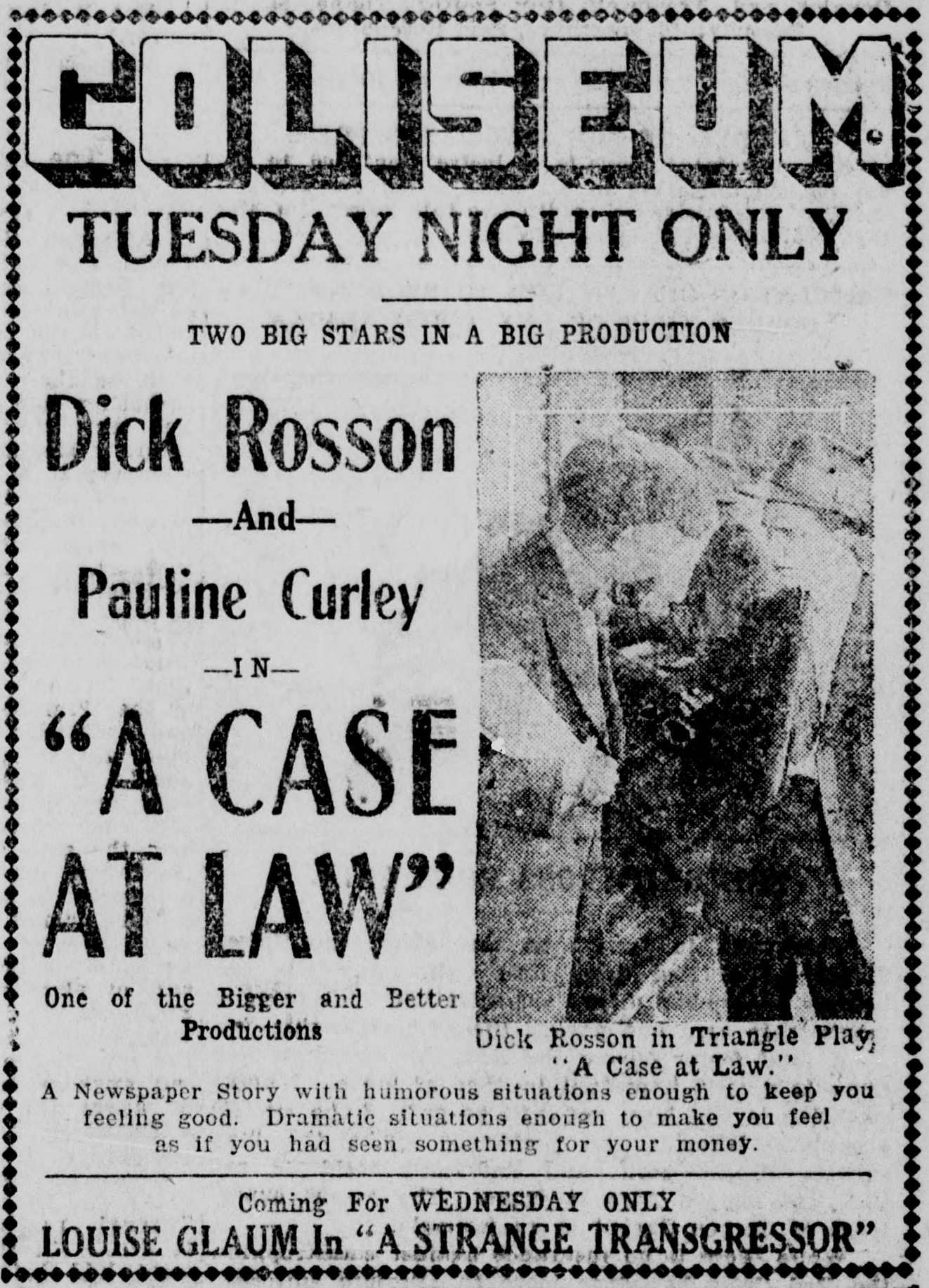
- Contemporary newspaper
- Directed by: Arthur Rosson
- Written by: William Dudley Pelley
- Starring: Richard Rosson; Pauline Curley; Riley Hatch
- Cinematography: Roy F. Overbaugh
- Production company: Triangle Film Corporation
- Distributed by: Triangle Distributing
- Release date: November 18, 1917
- Running time: 50 minutes
- Country: United States
- Languages: Silent; English intertitles

A Case at Law is a 1917 American silent Western drama film directed by Arthur Rosson and starring Richard Rosson, Pauline Curley and Riley Hatch. The film's production was supervised by Allan Dwan.

== Cast ==
- Richard Rosson as Jimmy Baggs
- Pauline Curley as Mayme Saunders
- Riley Hatch as Dr. Saunders
- John T. Dillon as Saloonkeeper Art
- Eddie Sturgis as The Lob

== Preservation ==
With no holdings located in archives, A Case at Law is considered a lost film.

== Bibliography ==
- Langman, Larry. A Guide to Silent Westerns. Greenwood Publishing Group, 1992.
