= Her Excellency, the Governor =

- Directed by: Al Parker
- Written by: Robert Shirley (scenario)
- Based on: His Excellency, the Governor by Robert Marshall
- Starring: Wilfred Lucas; Elda Milar
- Cinematography: Roy Vaughn
- Distributed by: Triangle Film Corporation
- Release date: June 24, 1917
- Running time: 50 minutes
- Country: United States
- Language: Silent (English intertitles)

Her Excellency, the Governor is a 1917 American silent drama film produced and distributed by the Triangle Film Corporation. Directed by Albert Parker, the film stars Elda Milar, who later became well known as gossip columnist Hedda Hopper. The film is loosely based the play His Excellency, the Governor, by Robert Marshall.

== Cast ==
- Wilfred Lucas - James Barclay
- Hedda Hopper as Sylvia Marlowe (credited as Elda Milar)
- Joseph Kilgour- Joe Keller
- Regan Hughston- Governor's Secretary
- Walter Walker - Capitalist
- Edith Speare - Lieutenant Governor
- Albert Perry - Reform Senator

== Reception ==
Like many American films of the time, Her Excellency, the Governor was subject to cuts by city and state film censorship boards. The Chicago Board of Censors required the cutting of an intertitle that stated, "You're around her quite often - why don't you compromise her?"
