= The Man Who Made Good =

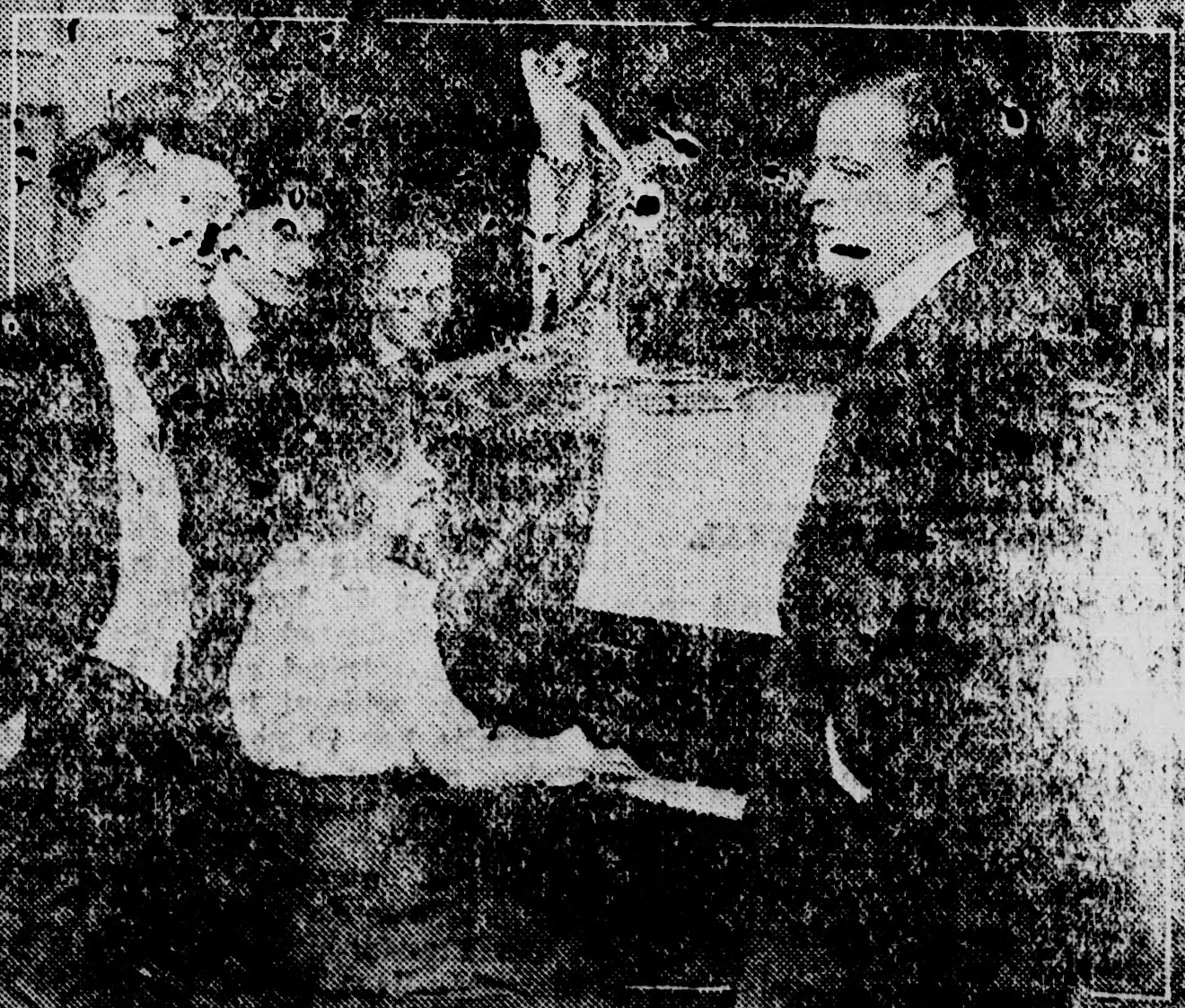
- Scene from the film
- Directed by: Arthur Rosson
- Written by: Robert Shirley
- Starring: Jack Devereaux; Winifred Allen; Henry Dixon
- Cinematography: Roy F. Overbaugh
- Production company: Fine Arts Film Company
- Distributed by: Triangle Distributing
- Release date: May 13, 1917
- Running time: 50 minutes
- Country: United States
- Languages: Silent; English intertitles

The Man Who Made Good is a 1917 American silent comedy drama film directed by Arthur Rosson and starring Jack Devereaux, Winifred Allen and Henry Dixon.

== Cast ==
- Jack Devereaux as Tom Burton
- Winifred Allen as Frances Clayton
- Henry Dixon as Flash Lewis
- Barney Gilmore as Josiah Whitney
- Albert Tavernier as Pop Clark
- Blanche Davenport as Mom Clark

== Preservation ==
With no holdings located in archives, The Man Who Made Good is considered a lost film.

== Bibliography ==
- Robert B. Connelly. The Silents: Silent Feature Films, 1910-36, Volume 40, Issue 2. December Press, 1998.
