= Grafters (film) =

1917 film

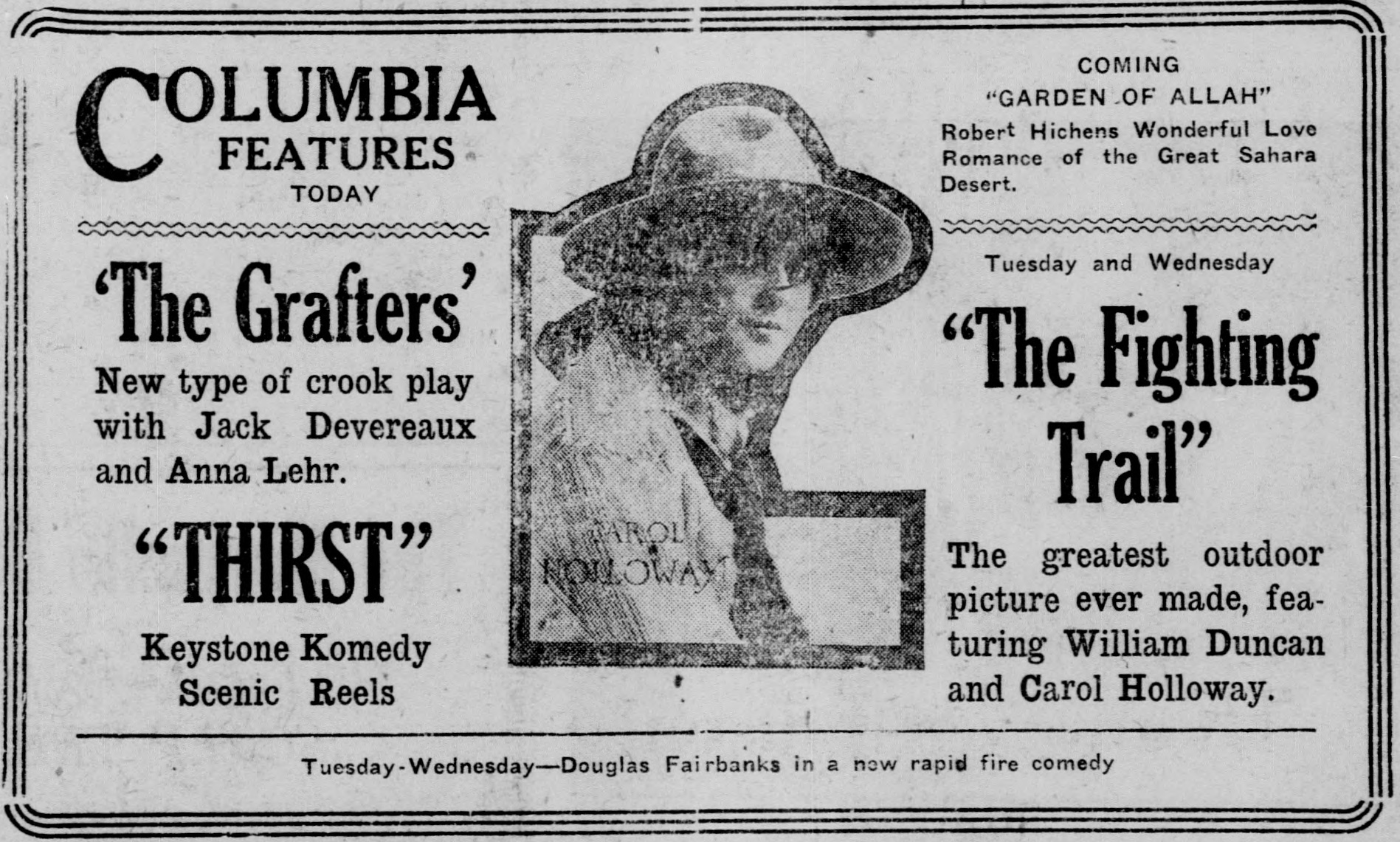
- Advertisement for this film and for the film The Fighting Trail
- Directed by: Arthur Rosson
- Written by: James W. Adams
- Starring: Jack Devereaux; Anna Lehr; Frank Currier
- Cinematography: Roy F. Overbaugh
- Production company: Triangle Film Corporation
- Distributed by: Triangle Distributing
- Release date: August 26, 1917
- Running time: 50 minutes
- Country: United States
- Languages: Silent; English intertitles

Grafters is a 1917 American silent drama film directed by Arthur Rosson and starring Jack Devereaux, Anna Lehr and Frank Currier. Director Allan Dwan supervised the shooting of the film.

== Cast ==
- Jack Devereaux as Jack Towne
- Anna Lehr as Doris Ames
- Frank Currier as Mark Towne
- Irene Leonard as Mrs. Ames
- George Siegmann as The Menace
- Robert Crimmins as Laughing Louie

== Bibliography ==
- Robert B. Connelly. The Silents: Silent Feature Films, 1910-36, Volume 40, Issue 2. December Press, 1998.
