= Winifred Allen =

American actress (1896–1943)

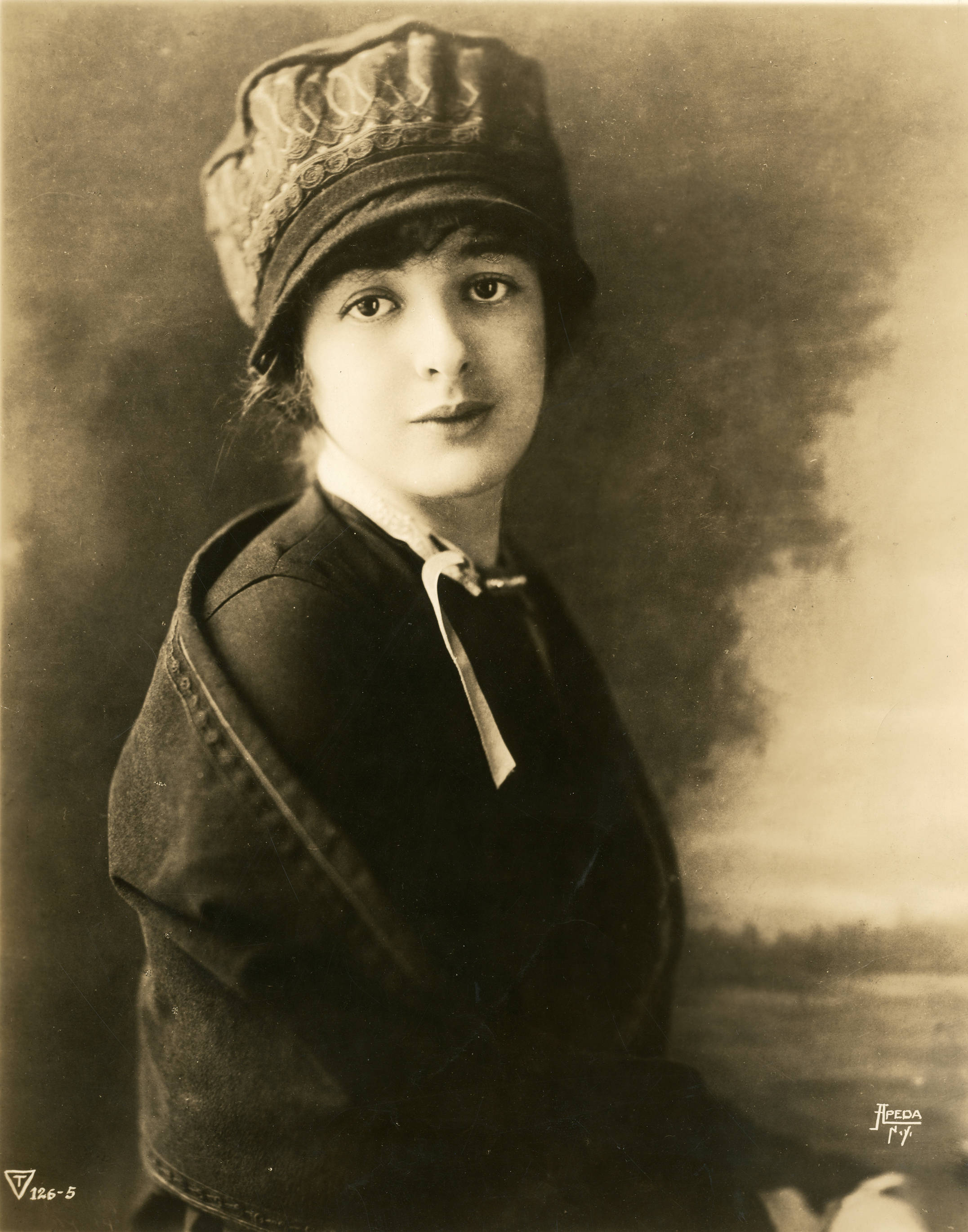
- Allen in 1921
- Born: June 26, 1896; New Rochelle, New York, U.S.
- Died: January 3, 1943 (aged 46); New York, U.S.
- Other names: Winifred Sperry Tenney
- Occupation: Actress
- Years active: 1915–1924
- Spouses: Lawrence Sperry (m. 1918; died 1923) Vernon E. Tenney (m. 1929)
- Relatives: Elmer Ambrose Sperry (father-in-law)

Winifred Allen (June 26, 1896 – January 3, 1943) was an American silent film actress. She appeared in several films between 1915 and 1924. She was known later as Winifred Sperry Tenney.

== Early years ==
Allen was born in New Rochelle, New York, the daughter of Henry D'Arcy Kelly. Her mother was born in Ireland. She graduated from the public schools there and went on to study at the Art Students League of New York. The deaths of both parents prompted her to leave school and seek a career in films. Her sister May Allen was also an actress.

== Career ==
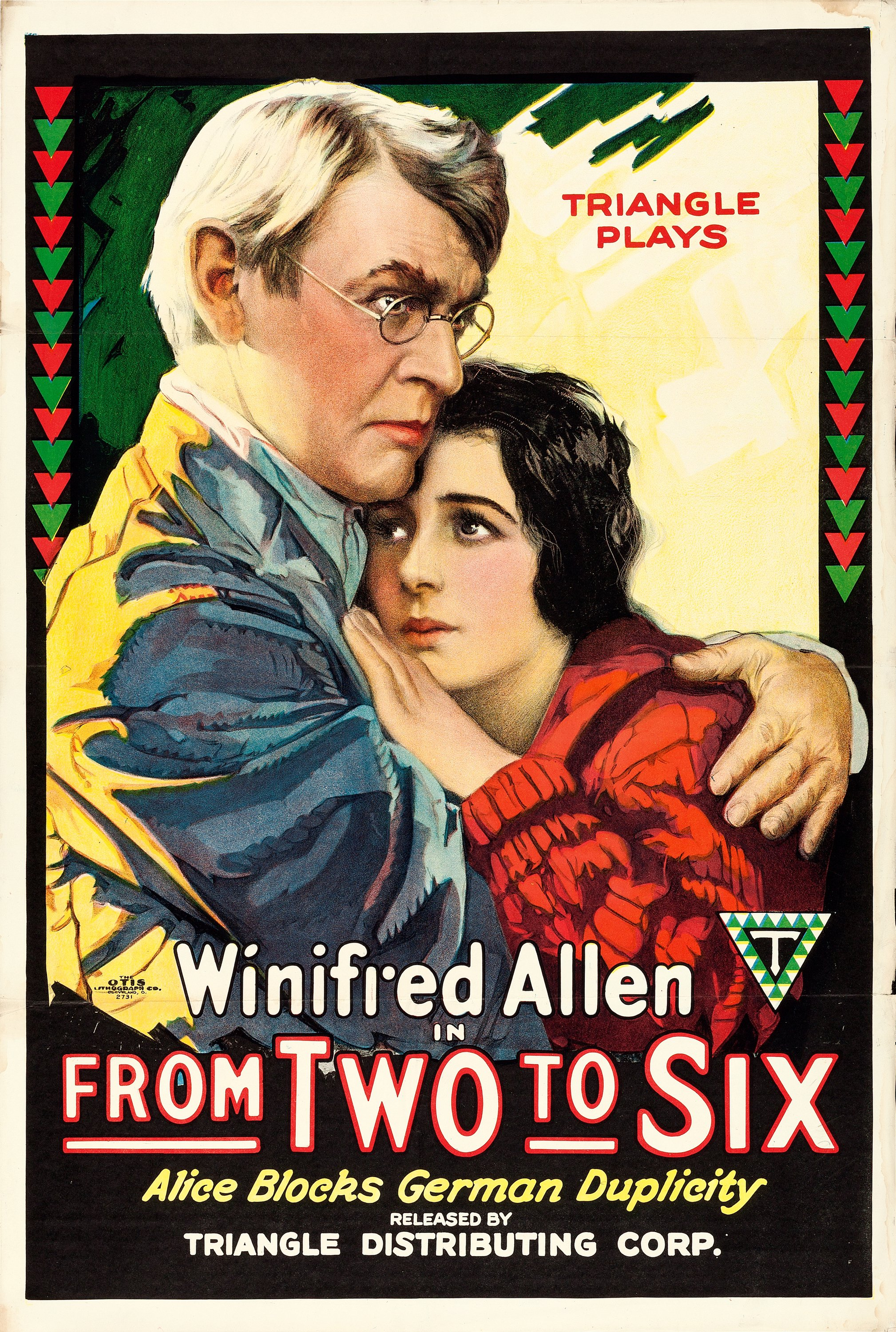
Poster for From Two to Six (1918)

Allen acted with the Edison and Reliance studios, as well as with other film companies. She appeared in 11 films listed by the American Film Institute, all made between 1915 and 1924. "Winifred Allen did genuine and delightful work as the plucky little bride" of Jack Deveraux's character, according to a 1917 review of The Man Who Made Good. She played Jack Deveraux's wife again in American – That's All (1917). She and actress Ann Dvorak knitted warm items for American soldiers during the filming if The Man Hater (1917).

== Publications ==
- "To the Studio by Aerial-Taxi" (March 1918)

== Personal life ==
In 1918 Allen married aviation pioneer Lawrence Sperry, and Flying magazine reported that they were "the first couple to take an aerial honeymoon" after they flew from Amityville to Governors Island. They had two children, also named Lawrence and Winifred. Sperry died in an airplane crash in 1923. She married Vernon E. Tenney in 1929. The Tenneys divorced in 1935, and he died at sea in 1937. She lived in Hawaii with her children in the 1930s. She died in 1943, in New York, at the age of 46.

== Selected filmography ==
- When We Were Twenty-One (1915)
- Seventeen (1916)
- The Long Trail (1917)
- The Haunted House (1917)
- American – That's All (1917)
- For Valour (1917)
- The Man Hater (1917)
- A Successful Failure (1917)
- The Man Who Made Good (1917)
- From Two to Six (1918)
- Second Youth (1924)
