= Midnight Alibi =

1934 film by Alan Crosland

- Directed by: Alan Crosland
- Screenplay by: Warren Duff
- Based on: The Old Doll House; 1933 story in Collier's by Damon Runyon
- Produced by: Robert Presnell Sr.
- Starring: Richard Barthelmess; Ann Dvorak; Helen Chandler
- Cinematography: William Rees
- Edited by: Jack Killifer
- Music by: Heinz Roemheld
- Production company: First National Pictures
- Distributed by: Warner Bros. Pictures
- Release date: July 14, 1934
- Running time: 58 minutes
- Country: United States
- Language: English

Midnight Alibi is a 1934 American pre-Code crime comedy drama film directed by Alan Crosland, produced by First National Pictures, distributed by Warner Bros. Pictures and starring Richard Barthelmess. The film is an adaptation of Damon Runyon's 1933 short story The Old Doll's House. This was Barthelmess' last film for First National after 15 years at the studio.

A print of the film is preserved at the Library of Congress. The film is also available on DVD on demand from the Warner Archive.

== Plot ==
A gangster returns to New York after some time in Europe and falls in love with Joan, unaware that she's the younger sister of his bitter rival, Angie the Ox. After an attempted hit on him, he seeks refuge in the home of an old lady, who tells him of her own romance many years ago with a man who looked just like him. Their friendship will prove useful later when he is accused of murder.

== Cast ==
- Richard Barthelmess as Lance McGowan
- Ann Dvorak as Joan
- Helen Chandler as Abigail
- Helen Lowell as The Old Doll
- Henry O'Neill as Ardsley
- Robert Barrat as Angie the Ox
- Robert McWade as Senator
- Purnell Pratt as Wilson
- Harry Tyler as Hughie
- Paul Hurst as Babe the Butcher
- Arthur Aylesworth as Louie the Blind Man
- Vincent Sherman as Black Mike
