= The Ghost Flower =

1918 silent film directed by Frank Borzage

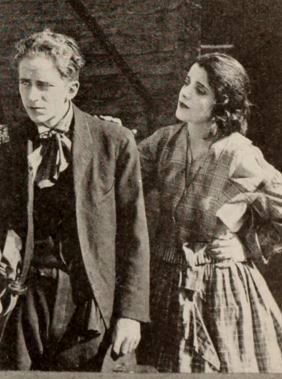
- still taken on set
- Directed by: Frank Borzage; Amy E. Sacker (asst.)
- Written by: Catherine Carr; Madeline Matzen (story)
- Produced by: Triangle Film Corporation
- Starring: Alma Rubens
- Cinematography: Jack McKenzie
- Distributed by: Triangle
- Release date: August 18, 1918
- Running time: 5 reels
- Country: USA
- Language: Silent (with English titles)

The Ghost Flower is a lost 1918 silent film drama directed by Frank Borzage and starring Alma Rubens.

== Cast ==
- Alma Rubens as Giulia
- Charles West as La Farge
- Francis McDonald as Tony Cafarelli
- Richard Rosson as Paola
- Emory Johnson as Duke De Chaumont
- Naida Lessing as La serena
- Tote Du Crow as Ercolano
