= Alias Mary Brown =

1918 film

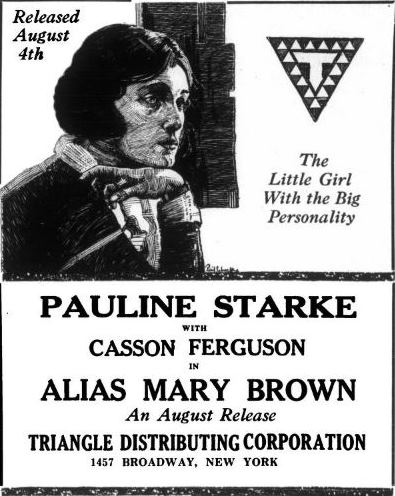
- Directed by: Henri D'Elba
- Written by: E. Magnus Middleton
- Starring: Pauline Starke; Casson Ferguson; Arthur Millett
- Cinematography: Elgin Lessley
- Production company: Triangle Film Corporation
- Distributed by: Triangle Distributing
- Release date: August 4, 1918
- Running time: 50 minutes
- Country: United States
- Languages: Silent; English intertitles

Alias Mary Brown is a 1918 American silent crime film directed by Henri D'Elba and starring Pauline Starke, Casson Ferguson and Arthur Millett.

== Cast ==
- Pauline Starke as Betty
- Casson Ferguson as Dick Browning, aka Mary Brown
- Arthur Millett as Hewlett
- Eugene Burr as Watson
- Sidney De Gray as Carnac
- Walter Belasco as Uncle Ike
- F. Thompson as Gunter
- Richard Rosson as Weasel
- Alberta Lee as Mrs. Browning

== Bibliography ==
- Ken Wlaschin. Silent Mystery and Detective Movies: A Comprehensive Filmography. McFarland, 2009.
