= Albert Parker (director) =

American film director (1885–1974)

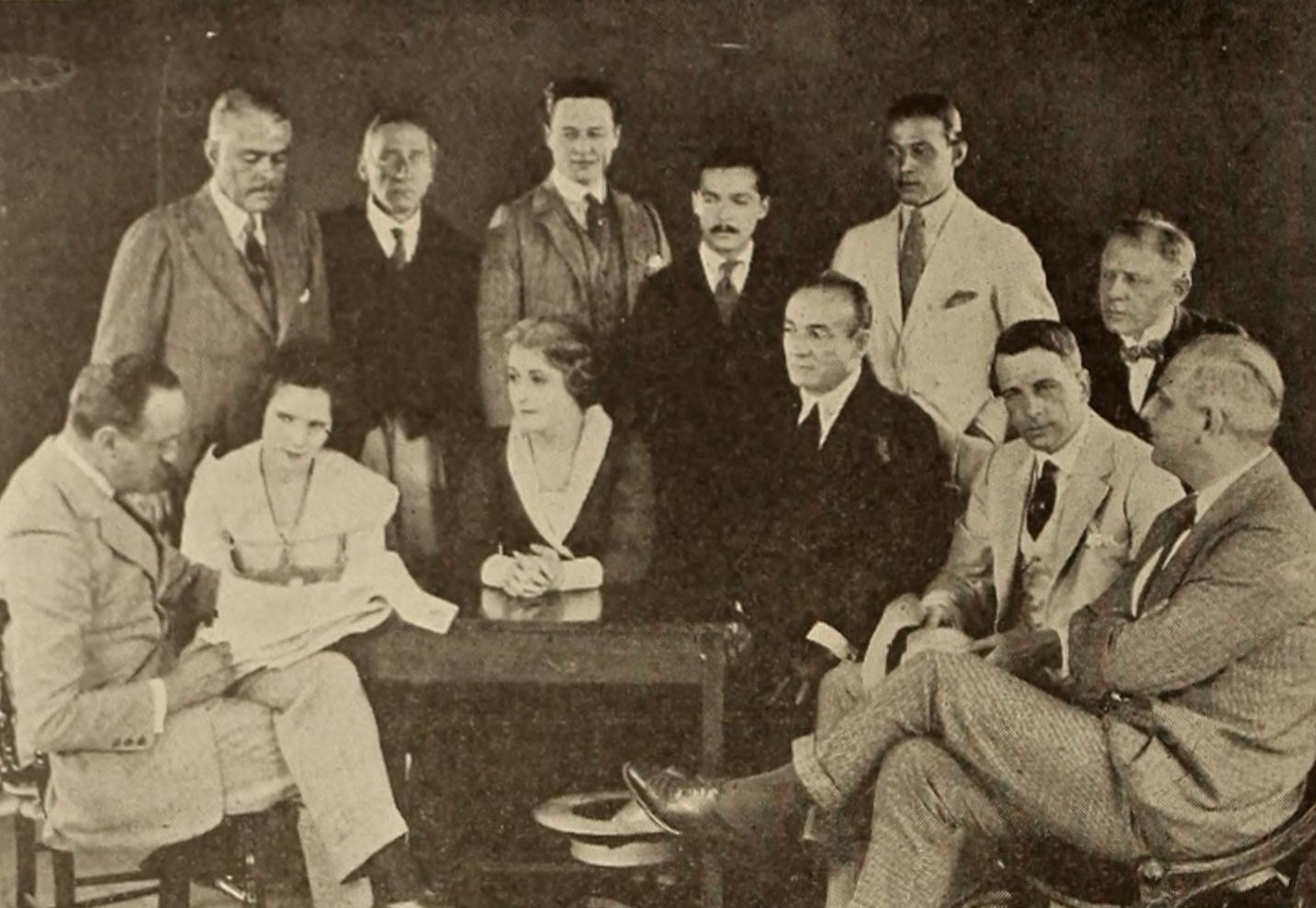
- Parker at left with the cast from Eyes of Youth (1919)
- Born: May 11, 1885; New York City, US
- Died: August 10, 1974 (aged 89); London, England
- Occupation: Film director
- Years active: 1917–1938
- Spouse: Margaret Johnston (m. 1946)

Albert Parker (May 11, 1885 – August 10, 1974) was an American film director, producer, screenwriter and actor. He directed 36 films between 1917 and 1938. In the early 1930s Parker left Hollywood for England where he continued to direct films and also opened an actors' agency office. One of his later clients in the 1960s was actress Helen Mirren. He was born in New York, USA, and died in London, England.

== Selected filmography ==
- American Aristocracy (1916) (as actor)
- In Again, Out Again (1917) (as actor)
- For Valour (1917)
- Her Excellency, the Governor (1917)
- The Haunted House (1917)
- The Man Hater (1917)
- Shifting Sands (1918)
- The Secret Code (1918)
- Arizona (1918)
- Annexing Bill (1918)
- From Two to Six (1918)
- The Other Woman (1918)
- Waifs (1918)
- The Knickerbocker Buckaroo (1919)
- Eyes of Youth (1919)
- The Branded Woman (1920)
- Sherlock Holmes (1922)
- Second Youth (1924)
- The Rejected Woman (1924)
- The Black Pirate (1926)
- The Love of Sunya (1927)
- The Right to Live (1932)
- Rolling in Money (1934)
- The Third Clue (1934)
- The Riverside Murder (1935)
- The White Lilac (1935)
- Late Extra (1935)
- Blind Man's Bluff (1936)
- Troubled Waters (1936)
- There Was a Young Man (1937)
- The Five Pound Man (1937)
- Strange Experiment (1937)
- Second Thoughts (1938)
- Murder in the Family (1938)
