= A Tailor-Made Man =

A Tailor-Made Man may refer to:

- A Tailor-Made Man (play), a 1917 Broadway play by Harry James Smith
- A Tailor-Made Man (1922 film), 1922 silent film adaptation of the play
- A Tailor Made Man, 1931 American film adaptation of the play
