= Harry James Smith =

American dramatist

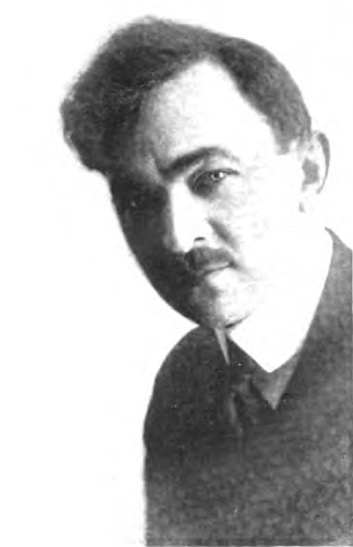
Harry James Smith

Harry James Smith (May 24, 1880 – March 16, 1918) was an American playwright and novelist. His best known plays include A Tailor-Made Man, first produced in 1917 and adapted into films of the same name in 1922 and 1931. His 1913 play Blackbirds was also adapted into films. Educated at Williams College and Harvard University, he also studied biology, taught briefly at Oberlin University and was an editor at The Atlantic Monthly before turning to writing full-time. He was killed in a traffic collision in British Columbia while collecting peat moss for its use in surgical dressings.

== Early life ==
Harry James Smith was born in New Britain, Connecticut, on May 24, 1880, seventh of the nine children of John B. and Lucy F. Smith. After finishing high school in 1897, he taught for several months in the District School at Cornwall Hollow, Connecticut. He entered Williams College, where he was an honor student and during his senior year was editor of the Williams Literary Monthly. For the 1902–03 school year he was an assistant in the Marine Biological Laboratory at Woods Hole, Massachusetts He studied English at Harvard, receiving his master's degree in 1904; and in 1904–05 taught in the English Department at Oberlin College. From 1906 to 1907 he was on the editorial staff of The Atlantic Monthly magazine.

== Writing ==
His first novel, Amédée's Son was published in 1908, followed by Enchanted Ground in 1910. His first play, Mrs. Bumpstead-Leigh was given its trial production in Chicago. It ran on Broadway in April, 1911, produced by Harrison Grey Fiske and starring Minnie Maddern Fiske.

Blackbirds was produced by Henry Miller in 1913, running only two weeks in New York. It starred Laura Hope Crews, who also starred in the 1915 silent film of the same name, produced by Jesse Lasky and directed by J. P. McGowan.

In 1917, A Tailor-Made Man was produced on Broadway. It was adapted into a 1922 silent film directed by Joe De Grasse, and a 1931 film directed by Sam Wood.

Other plays by Smith include Suki; Oh! Imogen; The Little Teacher; The Countess and Patrick, rewritten into Effie's Soul; Mathilda Comes Back (in collaboration with Eloise Steele); Big Jerry; Game; Ladybird, and Northward Ho!

== Last years ==
In 1917, after study with the Canadian engineer John Bonsall Porter, he began his own work with sphagnum ("peat") moss. During the summer his collecting and preparing of the moss was done under the auspices of the National Surgical Dressings Committee of New York; but in December, 1917, he received his brevet from the American Red Cross, and late in February he went to Seattle to investigate the supply of moss in the Northwest and to help in organizing the work. After two weeks, he went to British Columbia to arrange for a shipment of moss for the Canadian Red Cross, and it was there, on March 16, 1918, near Murrayville, that he was killed in a train and automobile collision.
