= Blackbirds (1915 film) =

1915 film by J. P. McGowan

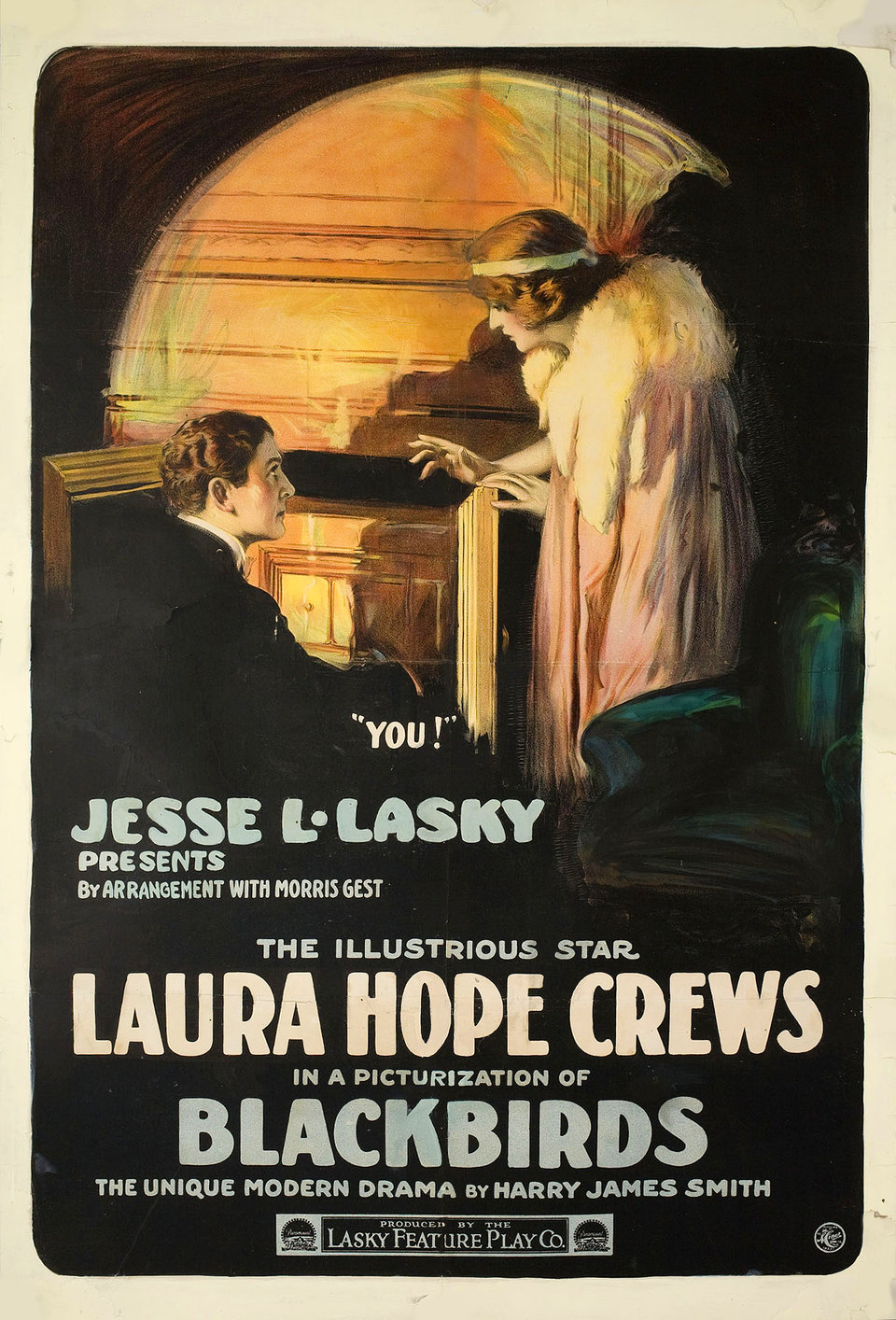
- Film poster
- Directed by: J. P. McGowan
- Written by: Margaret Turnbull (scenario)
- Based on: Blackbirds; 1913 play by Harry James Smith
- Produced by: Jesse Lasky; Morris Gest
- Cinematography: Charles Rosher
- Distributed by: Paramount Pictures
- Release date: October 14, 1915
- Running time: 5 reels
- Country: United States
- Language: Silent (English intertitles)

Blackbirds is an extant 1915 American silent film drama produced by Jesse Lasky and distributed through Paramount Pictures. The film marks an early starring screen appearance by actress Laura Hope Crews in this her second motion picture. The film is based on a 1913 Broadway play, Blackbirds, by Harry James Smith which also starred Crews. This is a surviving film at the Library of Congress.

It was remade in a 1920 film of the same name starring Justine Johnstone.

== Plot summary ==
Blackbirds tells the story of Leonie Sobatsky, a sharp-witted and resourceful woman who becomes entangled in a thrilling tale of crime, deception, and romance. Leonie, a skilled con artist, infiltrates high society under the guise of a sophisticated socialite, using her charm and intelligence to navigate a world fraught with danger and intrigue. Her life takes an unexpected turn when she encounters Jack Doggins, a man leading a double life as the Honorable Nevil Trask. Jack, like Leonie, is no stranger to deception, and the two form a tenuous partnership as they embark on a high-stakes adventure.

The plot revolves around a daring scheme involving the theft of valuable jewels, a crime that draws the attention of both law enforcement and dangerous criminal elements. As Leonie and Jack work together to outsmart their adversaries, they find themselves caught in a web of mistaken identities, shifting alliances, and escalating peril. Their journey is marked by clever ruses, close escapes, and moments of unexpected vulnerability as they begin to trust one another.

As the story unfolds, Leonie is forced to confront her own moral compass, questioning the choices that have led her to this point. Jack, too, grapples with his own motivations and the consequences of his actions. Together, they must navigate a treacherous path to achieve their goals, all while evading capture and staying one step ahead of their enemies.

== Cast ==
- Laura Hope Crews - Leonie Sobatsky
- Thomas Meighan - Jack Doggins/Honorable Nevil Trask
- George Gebhardt - Bechel
- Raymond Hatton - Hawke Jr.
- Jane Wolfe - Countess Maroff (* as Jane Wolf)
- Florence Dagmar - Miss Crocker
- Evelyn Desmond - Mrs. Crocker
- Edwin Harley - Mr. Crocker (* as Ed Harley)
- Frederick Wilson - Abie Isaacs

== Distribution ==
The copyright of the film, applied for by Jesse L. Lasky Feature Play Co., Inc., was registered on September 23, 1915, under the number LU6443 . Distributed by Paramount Pictures and presented by Jesse L. Lasky, the film was released in U.S. theaters on October 14, 1915. In France, it was released on February 2, 1923, under the title La Dupe.

A complete copy of the film is preserved in the archives of the Library of Congress in Washington.
