= Alberta Gallatin =

American actress (1861–1948)

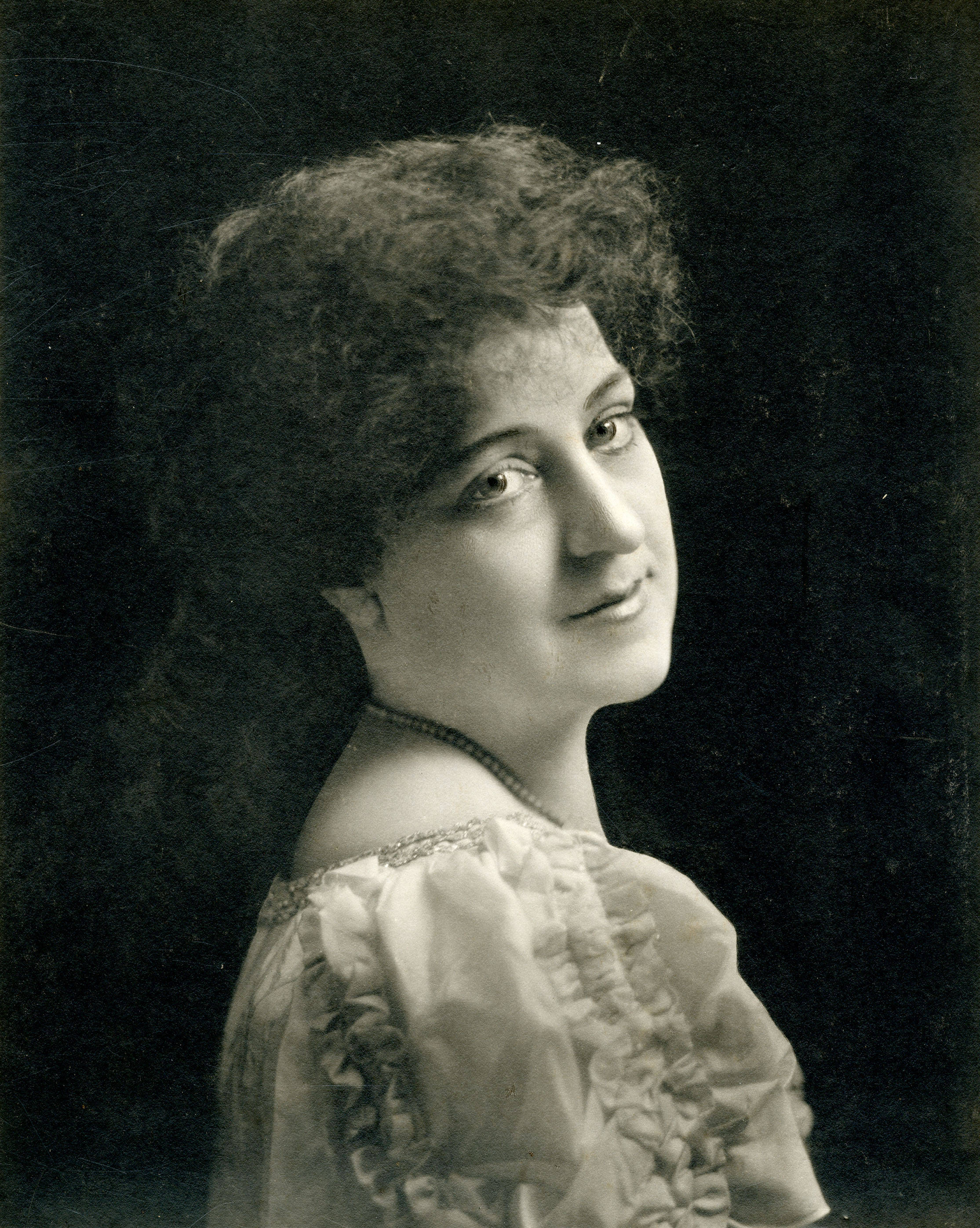
- Born: Alberta Gallatin Jenkins; May 5, 1861; Cabell County, Virginia (today part of West Virginia)
- Died: August 25, 1948 (aged 87); New York City
- Occupations: Stage and Film Actress

Alberta Gallatin (April 5, 1861 – August 25, 1948) was an American stage and film actress active in the late 19th and early 20th centuries. During her near forty-year career she acted in support of the likes of Elizabeth Crocker Bowers, James O’Neil, Edwin Booth, Joseph Jefferson, Thomas W. Keene, Richard Mansfield, Johnston Forbes-Robertson, Minnie Maddern Fiske, Otis Skinner, Maurice Barrymore, Joseph Adler, E. H. Sothern and James K. Hackett. Gallatin was perhaps best remembered by theatergoers for her varied classical roles, as Mrs. Alving in Henrik Ibsen's domestic tragedy Ghosts and the central character in the Franz Grillparzer tragedy Sappho. Counted among her few film roles was the part of Mrs. MacCrea in the 1914 silent film The Christian, an early 8-reel production based on the novel by Hall Caine.

According to at least one of her obituaries, the American critic Alexander Woollcott had considered Gallatin "the greatest American-born actress ever to grace the stage."

== Early life and family ==
Alberta Gallatin Jenkins was born at the Jenkin's plantation near present-day Lesage, West Virginia, the middle of a son and two daughters born to Virginia Southard Bowlin and Albert Gallatin Jenkins. Her father, a descendant of the politician and diplomat Albert Gallatin, was a Harvard-educated attorney, planter and Virginia congressman who served as a general with the Confederate Army during the American Civil War. Gallatin's mother was the daughter of Missouri congressman James Butler Bowlin. Gallatin was later legally adopted by her maternal grandfather after Albert Jenkins lost his life at the Battle of Cloyd's Mountain. Sometime later her mother married George Center Brown, an attorney and newspaper correspondent who in 1867 covered the signing of the Medicine Lodge Treaty along with fellow journalist Henry Morton Stanley.

Gallatin was raised in St. Louis where she attended the Mary Institute and afterwards involved herself in social activities that often drew mention in the society pages of local newspapers. She made her professional acting debut during the 1885–1886 theatre season.

== Stage career ==
In February 1886 she appeared with Madame Janish at the Leubrie Theatre, Memphis playing a flirtatious baroness in Princess Anréa, an adaptation of Victorien Sardou's Andréa: Comedie En Quatre Actes, Six Tableaux.

That fall she toured with Elizabeth Crocker Bowers in Edmund Falconer's historical drama Mary Stuart, playing Lady Jane Gray to Bower's Stuart. On October 4, 1886, Falconer's play began a four-week run on Broadway at the Fourteenth Street Theatre. Afterwards Gallatin returned to the road with Bowers’ company in Mary Stuart and as Margaret Lamburn in Elisabeth, an English version of Paolo Giacometti's Elisabeth Königin von England, Alicia in John Brougham's adaptation of Lady Audley's Secret, and parts in Lucretia Borgia, an adaptation of Gaetano Donizetti's Lucretia Borgia: a lyric tragedy in two acts and George Coleman's The Jealous Wife.

On the afternoon of February 12, 1887, following a matinée performance of Lady Audley's Secret at the Masonic Opera House in Augusta, Georgia, a fire broke out that destroyed the theater and nearby Globe and Central hotels. Bowers’ company managed to escape with just the clothes on their backs, leaving behind wardrobes valued upwards of $20,000. Gallatin's wardrobes alone were valued at around $800. As a result of the Augusta fire, Bowers canceled their remaining Southern tour dates and returned to New York.

By June 1888 Gallatin was touring with the King Hedley Company playing Julianna in Frank Harvey's (1842–1903) melodrama The Wages of Sin and, that fall, heading her own troupe, The Efficient Company, as Parthenia in Ingomar (also billed as Ingomar the Barbarian), Maria Lovell's adaptation of Friedrich Halm's Der Sohn der Wildnis.

In the fall of 1889 Gallatin joined the Lyceum Theatre Company stock company as a general understudy under the management of Daniel Frohman. In late 1890 she was engaged by a touring company headed by James O’Neil to play Catherine Duvall to his Henry Irving in Walter Herries Pollock's revision of the Watts Phillips story The Dead Heart. The following year she toured with a company starring Thomas W. Keene playing Lady Anne In Shakespeare's Richard III, Julie in Edward Bulwer-Lytton's historical drama Richelieu, and Maria in Louis XI, Edwin Ardue Smith's stage adaptation of Walter Scott's historical novel Quentin Durward.

Gallatin drew critical praise when on May 26, 1892, she appeared at the Madison Square Theatre in a special matinee performance of Shakespeare's "As You Like It", playing Rosalind to the Orlando of Otis Skinner. During the 1893–94 season Gallatin supported Richard Mansfield in road productions of Clyde Fitch's historical drama Beau Brummel, Shakespeare's The Merchant of Venice, Octave Feuillet's A Parisian Romance (Un Roman Parisien), Mansfield's farcical adaptation of the Archibald Clavering Gunter drama Prince Karl, and Mansfield's take on Robert Louis Stevenson's Dr. Jekyll and Mr. Hyde.

During the latter years of the closing decade of the 19th century Gallatin appeared with E. H. Sothern in Robert N. Stephens' An Enemy to the King, Minnie Maddern Fiske in Marguerite Merington's Love Finds the Way, and Chauncey Olcott in Augustus Pitou's Sweet Inniscarra. By late 1898 Gallatin had joined Edwin Thanhouser's company at the Milwaukee Academy of Music where she would play Ophelia to Henry Miller's Hamlet. The following spring she was in Denver with the Giffen Stock Company performing at the Tabor Grand Opera House and that fall she was chosen to replace Grace Atwell as the leading actress at the Girard Avenue Theatre, Philadelphia.

In January 1900 Gallatin played Mrs. Bulford at Boston's Castle Square Theatre in The Great Diamond Robbery, a crime thriller by Edward M. Alfriend and Andrew Carpenter Wheeler (aka Nym Crinkle). The following month she appeared at the Murray Hill Theatre, Manhattan as Margaret Knowlton to the Andrew Knowlton of Edmund Redmund in The Lost Paradise, Henry Churchill de Mille's adaptation of the Ludwig Fulda drama Das Verlorene Paradies. In late March 1900 Gallatin began a long tour playing the title role in Clyde Fitch's controversial play Sappho that had made its Broadway debut earlier in the year with Olga Nethersole; Nell Gwyn in Harold Cator Heverin's Under the Restoration (1900–01); Rosalind in Shakespeare's comedy As You Like It (1903); Mrs. Alving in Ibsen's domestic tragedy, Ghosts (1903–04); Tracy Auberton in A Clean Slate (1905), a comedy by R. C. Carton (Richard Claud Critchett); Kate Curtis in the Hubert Henry Davies social comedy Cousin Kate (1906); the title role in her dramatization of Charles Major's novel Dorothy Vernon of Haddon Hall (1907); and the starring role in Marie Manning's Judith of the Plains (1907–08), a Western romance adapted for the stage by Algernon Tassln and Mary Stone.

== Later career ==
Between 1911 and 1925 Gallatin appeared in seven Broadway productions, the most notable of which was probably Mary Morrison's 1915 translation of the Gerhart Hauptmann drama The Weavers. She appeared in a handful of silent films in the early 1910s that included The Christian, Vitagraph Studios first eight-reel production. Perhaps her final public performance came on January 13, 1939, at the Perroquet suite of the Waldorf Astoria New York in The Sale of the Raven, a playlet she both wrote and produced for a program sponsored by The Society of Virginia Women in New York.

On March 29, 1917, Gallatin filed a design with the United States Patent Office (Serial No. 158,175. (CI. 46–70.) 1.) for a device on rollers that made it easier for stagehands to move or change scenery during a theatrical production.

In 1920 Gallatin headed a group that founded the Edgar Allan Poe Society of New York and went on to serve as the organization's first president, a post she held for seventeen years.

== Private life ==
Gallatin, an Episcopalian, married twice: to actor Percy Sage (née Richardson) at Plainfield, New Jersey, in August 1887; and on the heels of their divorce after thirteen years of marriage, to Edwin Ogden Childe, in Atlantic City, New Jersey, on September 9, 1900. This union eventually ended in divorce. Their son, Edwin Jr., went on to marry Cynthia Carol Corlett, a great-granddaughter of the actor Joseph Jefferson.

== Death ==
Gallatin died at the age of 87 at Metropolitan Hospital, New York City.
