= Linthicum (disambiguation) =

Linthicum is a census-designated place and unincorporated community in Anne Arundel County, Maryland, United States.

Linthicum may also refer to:

- Linthicum station, Baltimore Light Rail station in Linthicum Heights, Maryland, U.S.
- Linthicum (surname)
