= Frederic De Belleville =

Belgian actor (1855–1923)

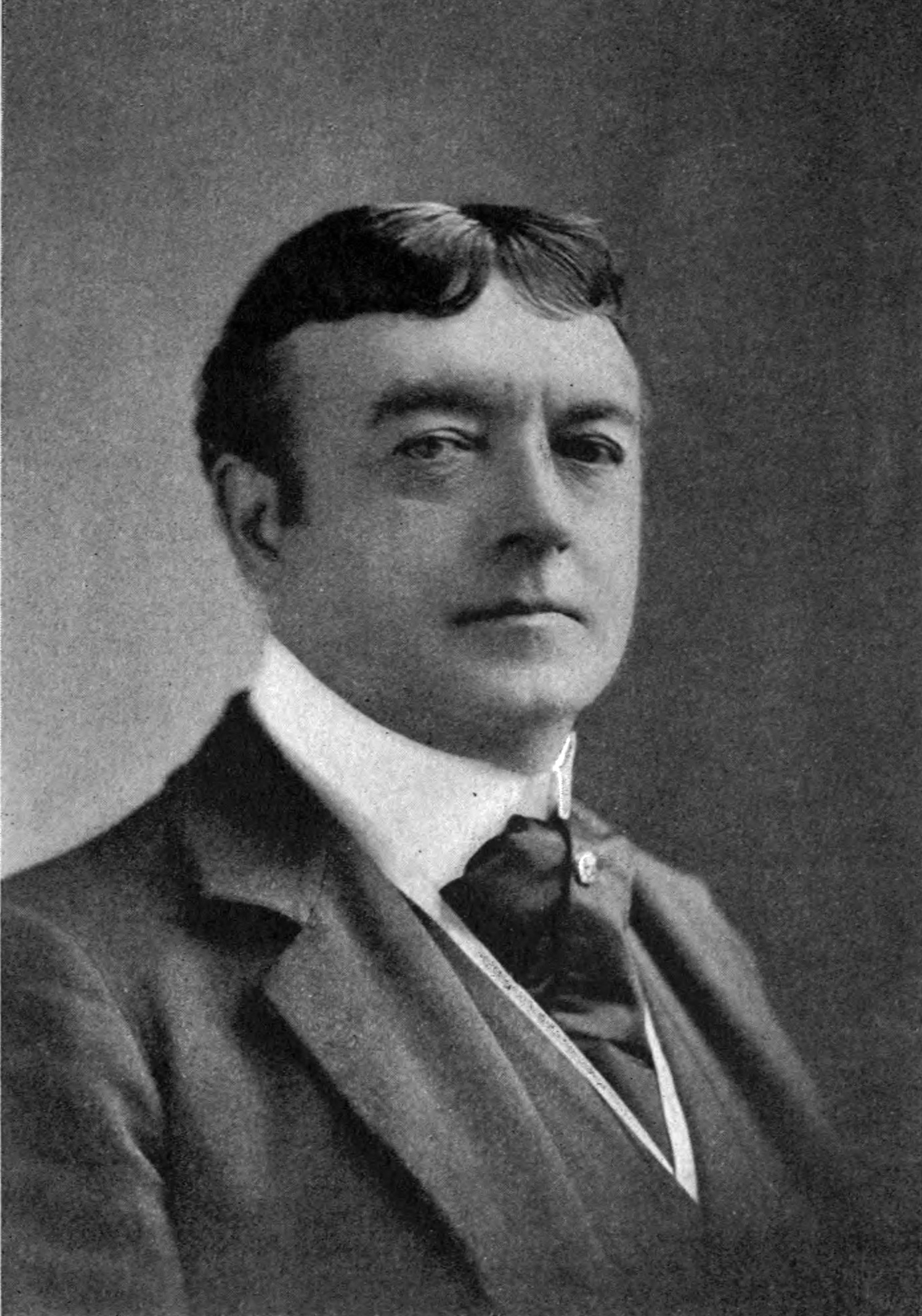
- Born: February 17, 1855; Liège, Belgium
- Died: February 25, 1923 (aged 68); New York City, United States
- Occupation: Actor
- Years active: 1873-1923
- Spouse(s): Edith Emmy Mueller (1908 - 19??; union dissolved); Dorothy Chester (July 1898 - 19??; union dissolved); Kate Cleveland, aka Kate Massi (January 1, 1886 - April 1, 1893; her death); Edith Cornish (January 1, 1880 - January 5, 1884; union annulled); Julia Jacobs Josephs (1876-1884; union dissolved)

Frederic De Belleville (February 17, 1855 in Liège – February 25, 1923 in New York City) was a Belgian-born American stage actor.

He began his career in 1873 in London and arrived in the United States in 1880. An early newspaper account records him as starring in a play False Friend for A. M. Palmer. He was long a leading man on the stage to Clara Morris, Rose Coghlan, Mrs. Fiske and Viola Allen. De Belleville appeared in three silent films.

De Belleville was apparently married and divorced several times. An early wife Maude Stuart died in childbirth in 1886. Their newborn son also called Frederic De Belleville did not survive infancy. He is buried beside Stuart.

== Selected plays ==
- Hoodman Blind (1887) (w/ Viola Allen)
- Men and Women (1890)
- Honour (1895)
- Love Finds the Way (1898)
- Little Italy (1899)
- Monte Cristo (1900)
- Tess of the D'Urbervilles (1902)
- Divorcons (1902)
- The Eternal City (1902)
- Susan in Search of a Husband, A Tenement Tragedy (1906)
- A Marriage of Reason (1907)
- Samson (1908)
- Everywoman (1911)
- Where Ignorance Is Bliss (1913)
- Secret Strings (1914)
- Caesar's Wife (1919)
- The Guest of Honor (1920)
- The Humming Bird (1923)(*De Belleville died during this play)

== Selected filmography ==
- The Daughter of the People (1915)
- A Trade Secret (1915)
- The New Adventures of J. Rufus Wallingford (1915)
