= Blackbirds (1920 film) =

1920 film by John Francis Dillon

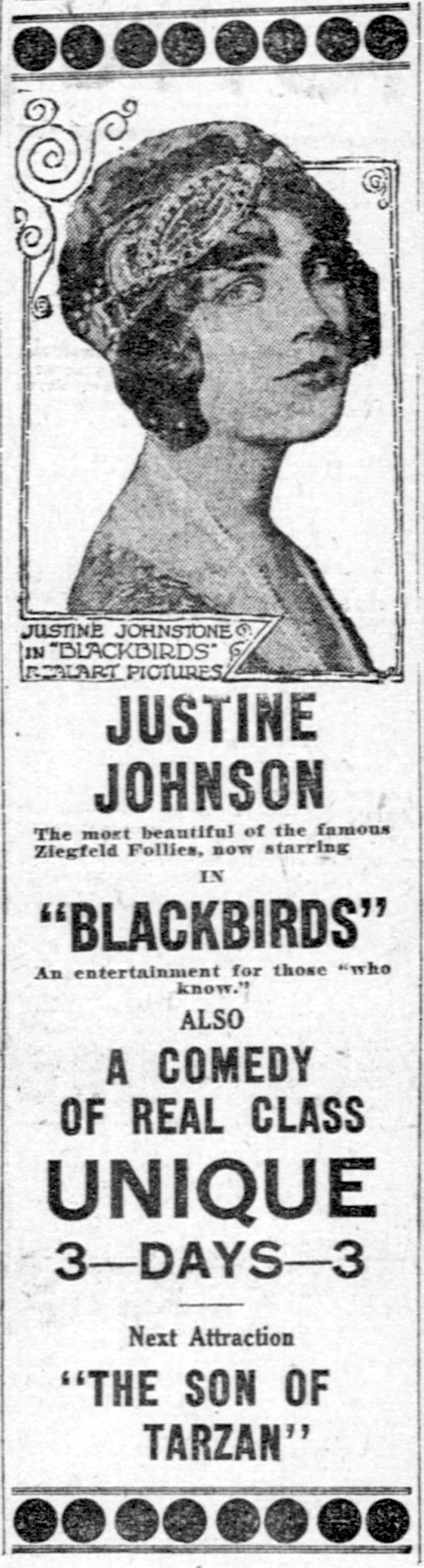
- Newspaper advertisement
- Directed by: John Francis Dillon(Jack Dillon); Ray Hallor(ass't director)
- Written by: Clara Beranger (scenario)
- Based on: Blackbirds; 1913 play by Harry James Smith
- Produced by: Realart Pictures
- Starring: Justine Johnstone; William "Stage" Boyd
- Cinematography: Arthur T. Quinn
- Distributed by: Realart Pictures
- Release date: December 4, 1920
- Running time: 5 reels

Blackbirds is a 1920 silent film crime drama produced and distributed by Realart Pictures, an affiliate of Paramount. It is based on a 1913 Broadway play Blackbirds by Harry James Smith. A previous 1915 version starred Laura Hope Crews who starred in the play. This version stars Justine Johnstone and William "Stage" Boyd.

== Cast ==
- Justine Johnstone - Countess Leonie
- William "Stage" Boyd - Detective(*billed as William Boyd)
- Charles K. Gerrard - Duval
- Jessie Arnold - Suzanne
- Walter Walker - Howard Crocker
- Marie Shotwell - Edna Crocker
- Grace Parker - Arline Crocker
- Ada Boshell - Grandma Crocker
- Alex Saskins - Griggs

== Preservation ==
With no prints of Blackbirds located in any film archives, it is considered a lost film.
