= Linthicum (surname) =

Linthicum is a surname. Notable people with the surname include:

- Dick Linthicum (1908/1909 – 1979), American basketball player
- Hezekiah Linthicum Bateman (1812-1875), American actor and manager
- John Charles Linthicum (1867-1932), American politician from Maryland
- John L. Linthicum (1838–1906), American politician from Maryland
- J. F. Linthicum, editor of Occidental and Vanguard
- Lotta Linthicum (1870s-1952) American actress
- Clayton Linthicum, Canadian guitarist and singer in Saskatchewan psych-folk-roots duo Kacy & Clayton.
