= Marguerite Merington =

American dramatist

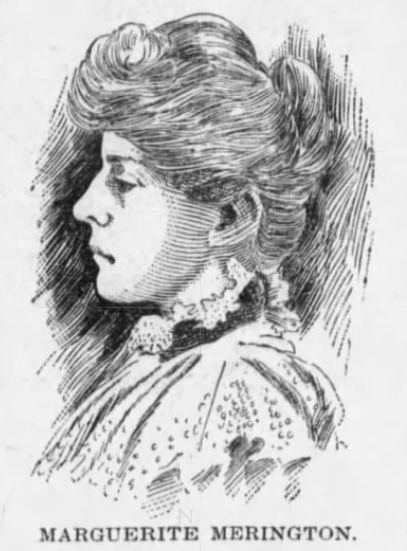
- Newspaper drawing of Merington in the Cheyenne County Rustler, 1896
- Born: 1857; Stoke Newington, Middlesex, England
- Died: May 20, 1951 (aged 94); New York City, U.S.
- Occupation: Author

Marguerite Merington (Note: The surname was sometimes misspelled as 'Merrington' in news reports.) (1857 – May 20, 1951) was an English-born American author of short stories, essays, dramatic works, and biographies. Born in England and raised in New York, she taught Greek and Latin at the Normal College in New York before establishing herself as a successful playwright and librettist, best known for her popular play Captain Lettarblair (1892). Over the course of her career, she wrote additional dramatic works, edited the correspondence of George A. Custer and Elizabeth Bacon Custer, and lived primarily in New York State.

== Early life and education ==
Marguerite Merington was born in Stoke Newington, England, in 1857, the daughter of Elizabeth and Richard Whiskin Crawford Merington (1827-1901), a clerk in the Bank of England. Her aunt was Martha Merington, a British politician, notable as the first woman to serve as a Poor Law Guardian.

In January 1869 she came with her parents to Buffalo, New York where she was educated at a convent. Even as a girl, she displayed dramatic talent, and often wrote and acted little parlor plays.

== Career ==
For several years, she was instructor in Greek and Latin in the Normal College in New York. After resigning from this position, Merington pursued the career of a dramatic author. About 1889, E. H. Sothern proposed that Merington should write him a play, the leading character of which should be a captivating Irish gentleman. With a few suggestions from him, the play, Captain Lettarblair was written. Before it was performed, Joseph Jefferson, saw the manuscript and praised it highly. The play had a trial run at an authors' matinee in New York City, and was first presented August 16, 1892, at the Lyceum Theatre. Captain Lettarblair, produced by Daniel Frohman, brought in large audiences, was financially successful, and held a place in Sothern's repertoire.

Merington wrote other dramas, including Good-Bye, A Lover's Knot, and the libretto of a comic opera, Daphne, or the Pipes of Arcadia. Set to music by Arthur Bird, of London, it gained the prize of US$500 from the New York Conservatory of Music. After having served as the private secretary of Elizabeth Bacon Custer, Merington became the editor of The Custer Story: The Life and Intimate Letters of General George A. Custer and His Wife Elizabeth.

== Death ==
Merington died on May 20, 1951, in her Manhattan home. Of her life she said: "There is absolutely nothing about me to be told, and that I never tell."

== Selected works ==
- At parting; comedy ...
- The Children's Garden : given in the name of Frances Hodgson Burnett.
- Kindly light; a modern morality play ...
- One life to give; drama in verse founded on the story of Nathan Hale ...
- An everyday man; comedy ...
- Love Finds the Way
- The island; a drama ...
- That little shabby gentleman; comedy ...
- The court of Ferrara; a dialogue ...
- Pepilia; comedy ...
- "Good-bye!" A story of love and sacrifice ...
- The musical isle ...
- The key to the house; play ...
- Drum and fife parade ...
- "Captain Lettarblair"; a drama in three acts
- Old orchard ... called Rose Valley in Chicago Production.
- Daphne, or, The pipes of Arcadia : three acts of singing nonsense, 1896
- The right ending : one-act sketch in blank verse for three persons, two men and one woman--, 19??
- Late Dyal & Co.; a farce-comedy in three acts., 19??
- Cranford; a play; a comedy in three acts made from Mrs. Gaskell's famous story., 1905
- The turn of the tide : a play in four acts, 1905
- The lady in the adjoining room : one-act play, 1905
- Snow-white : a play for children , 1905
- The Gibson play a two-act comedy based on Mr. Charles Dana Gibson's series of cartoons "A widow and her friends" originally printed in "Life,", 1901
- Scarlett of the Mounted ... Illustrated., 1906
- Picture plays, 1911
- More fairy tale plays, 1917
- Fairy tale plays, 1925
- Story of the Custer massacre, now fifty years past, is retold by widow of famous Indian fighter, 1926
- A Dish o' Tea Delayed. One-act play for high school girls, etc., 1937
- Edwin Booth; sketch for a cinema; sequence of scenes and dialogue,, 194?
- Booth episodes; play in eight episodes, nine scenes, founded on the life of Edwin Booth., 1944
- The Custer story : the life and intimate letters of General George A. Custer and his wife Elizabeth, 1950
