= Ida Lublenski Ehrlich =

- Born: August 20, 1886; Odesa
- Died: February 22, 1986 (aged 99); Carmel
- Occupation: Playwright

Ida Lublenski Ehrlich (August 20, 1886 – February 22, 1986) was a Russian Empire-born American playwright and teacher.

== Early life ==
Ida Lublenski was born on August 20, 1886 in Odesa, then part of the Russian Empire. Her family emigrated to the United States when she was two years old and lived on the Lower East Side of New York City.

== Career ==
The first of her plays to be staged was Helena's Boys, debuting at Henry Miller's Theatre on Broadway in April 1924. The play, starring Minnie Maddern Fiske in the title role and based on a story by Mary Brecht Pulver, was about a woman who curbed the radicalism of her two sons by pretending to radical behavior herself, including drunkenness and free love. It was generally poorly reviewed. Her play Love Kills, debuting at the Forrest Theatre in May 1934, starred Vivian Giesen as a woman named Pearl who takes a series of lovers before jumping out of a window. In 1940, she founded Everyman's Theatre to produce her plays off-Broadway using her own funds. Her thirteen plays include Dr. Johnson, The Magic Carpet, and Alice in Fableland.

She worked as a teacher from 1940 to 1963, teaching remedial reading at Public School 108. She published a reading book called Instant Vocabulary in 1969. She lived in Jerusalem from 1973 to 1980.

Ida Lublenski Ehrlich died on 22 February 1986 in Carmel, New York.

== Personal life ==
She married Simon Ehrlich in New York City in 1913. They had three children.

== Bibliography ==
- Helena's Boys (1924)
- Love Kills (1934)
