= SS Minnie M. Fiske =

World War II Liberty ship of the United States

History

United States
- Name: Minnie M. Fiske
- Namesake: Minnie M. Fiske
- Owner: War Shipping Administration (WSA)
- Operator: American South African Line, Inc.
- Ordered: as type (EC2-S-C1) hull, MC hull 1547
- Builder: J.A. Jones Construction, Panama City, Florida
- Cost: $1,327,812
- Yard number: 29
- Way number: 2
- Laid down: 8 December 1943
- Launched: 29 January 1944
- Completed: 15 March 1944
- Identification: Call Signal: KVWR
- Fate: Laid up in National Defense Reserve Fleet, Astoria, Oregon, 28 February 1947; Sold for scrapping, 30 March 1966

General characteristics
- Class & type: Liberty ship; type EC2-S-C1, standard
- Tonnage: 10,865 LT DWT; 7,176 GRT
- Displacement: 3,380 long tons (3,434 t) (light); 14,245 long tons (14,474 t) (max)
- Length: 441 feet 6 inches (135 m) oa; 416 feet (127 m) pp; 427 feet (130 m) lwl
- Beam: 57 feet (17 m)
- Draft: 27 ft 9.25 in (8.4646 m)
- Installed power: 2 × Oil fired 450 °F (232 °C) boilers, operating at 220 psi (1,500 kPa); 2,500 hp (1,900 kW)
- Propulsion: 1 × triple-expansion steam engine, (manufactured by Filer and Stowell, Milwaukee, Wisconsin); 1 × screw propeller
- Speed: 11.5 knots (21.3 km/h; 13.2 mph)
- Capacity: 562,608 cubic feet (15,931 m^{3}) (grain); 499,573 cubic feet (14,146 m^{3}) (bale)
- Complement: 38–62 USMM; 21–40 USNAG
- Armament: Varied by ship; Bow-mounted 3-inch (76 mm)/50-caliber gun; Stern-mounted 4-inch (102 mm)/50-caliber gun; 2–8 × single 20-millimeter (0.79 in) Oerlikon anti-aircraft (AA) cannons and/or, 2–8 × 37-millimeter (1.46 in) M1 AA guns

SS Minnie M. Fiske was a Liberty ship built in the United States during World War II. She was named after Minnie M. Fiske, a late nineteenth and early twentieth century actress that spearheaded the fight against the Theatrical Syndicate for the sake of artistic freedom.

== Construction ==
Minnie M. Fiske was laid down on 8 December 1943, under a United States Maritime Commission (MARCOM) contract, MC hull 1547, by J.A. Jones Construction, Panama City, Florida; she was launched on 29 January 1944.

== History ==
She was allocated to American South African Line, Inc., on 15 March 1944. On 28 February 1947, she was laid up in the National Defense Reserve Fleet, in Astoria, Oregon. On 10 June 1955, she was withdrawn from the fleet to be loaded with grain under the "Grain Program 1955", she returned loaded on 20 June 1955. She was withdrawn from the fleet on 11 July 1963, to be emptied, she returned 17 July 1963. On 30 March 1966, she was sold for $48,001 to Zidell Explorations, Inc., for scrapping. She was removed from the fleet on 16 June 1966.

== Bibliography ==
- "Jones Construction, Panama City FL". ShipbuildingHistory.com. 13 October 2010.
- "Liberty Ships – World War II".
- Maritime Administration. "Minnie M. Fiske". Ship History Database Vessel Status Card. U.S. Department of Transportation, Maritime Administration. Archived from the original on 12 December 2019.
- Davies, James (May 2004). "Specifications (As-Built)" (PDF). p. 23.
- "SS Minnie M. Fiske".
