= Mary Brecht Pulver =

American writer (1882–1926)

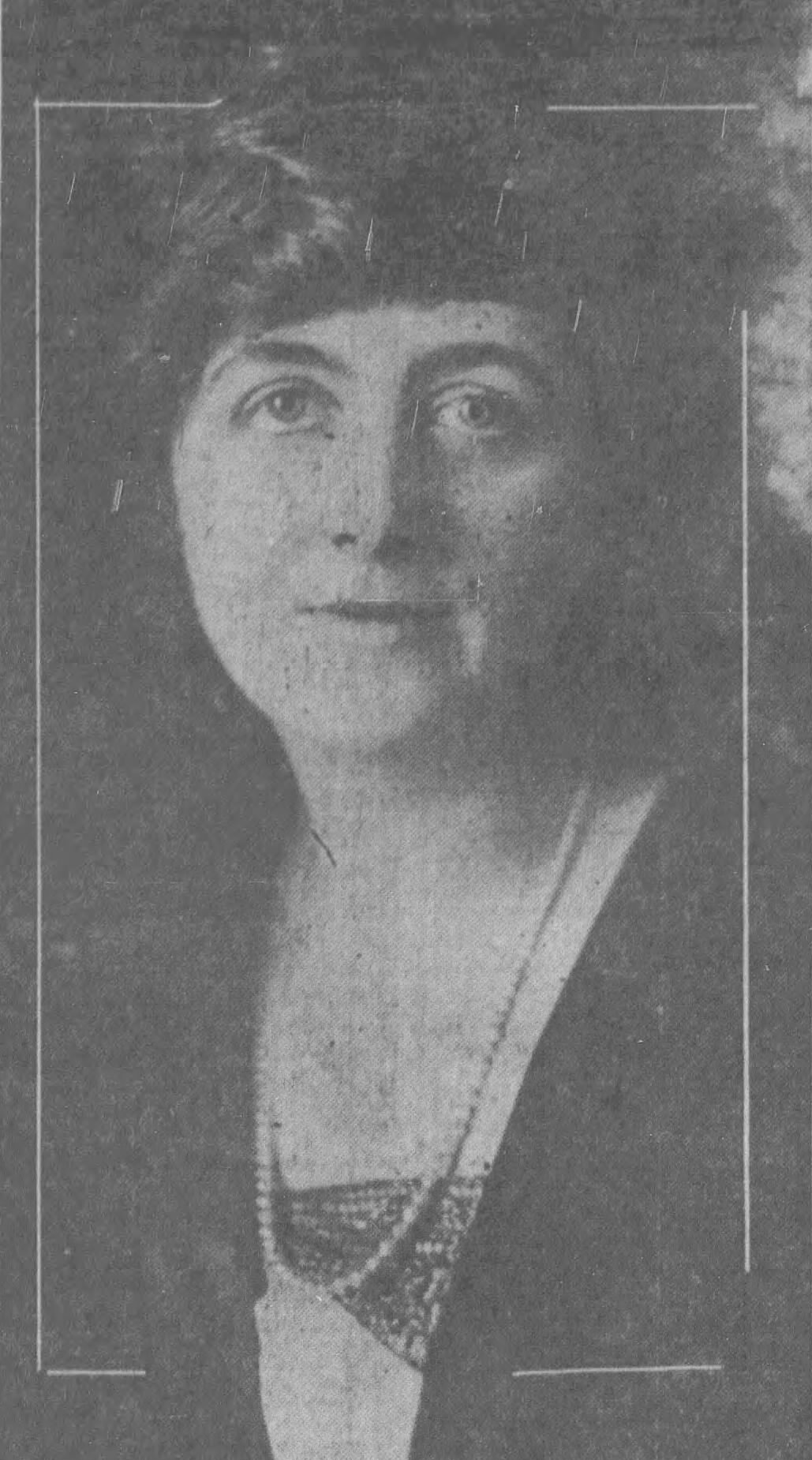
Mary Brecht Pulver

Mary Brecht Pulver (née Brecht; 1882 – July 16, 1926), was an American writer known for poems and short stories. Some of her work was adapted to film.

== Early life ==
Mary Agnes Brecht was born in Lancaster, Pennsylvania in 1882. Her parents were Mary M. (née Wolfe) and Milton J. Brecht. Her father was a teacher, principal, school superintendent, and public service commissioner in Lancaster, Pennsylvania.

She graduated from the Pennsylvania State Normal School at Millersville. In 1906, she attended the School of Applied Art in Philadelphia, graduating with a bachelor's and master's desgrees.

== Career ==
She wrote poetry and short stories for various anthologies and publications, including The Saturday Evening Post. During World War I, her verses were used for Liberty Loan drives. Her story "Western Stuff" is included in The Only Two Ways to Write a Story by John Gallishaw published in 1928.

In The Spring Lady she wrote about a woman in New York City who retreats from her business focused husband to an anonymous life on the countryside. Her writing was included in Short Stories of the New America. Her book Tales That Nimko Told was described as, "Amusing stories and clever verses told to a little boy by the fairy Nimko. Mary Sherwood Wright illustrated it. The book includes the story "The Dwarf and the Cobbler's Sons" that was republished in 1929 in More Story-Hour Favorites.

Pulver was a member of the Authors' Guild, Authors' League of America, Penwomen of America, and the Press Club of Lancaster.

Ida Lublenski Ehrlich adapted one of her short stories into the play Helena's Boys. Mrs. Fiske portrayed the "reactionary" mother in the comedy.

== Personal life ==
She married Dr. George Winfield Pulver in Lancaster in 1906. They lived in Deposit, New York, where her husband practice medicine. They had a son, Gordon Winfield Pulver (1912–1983). Her husband died in 1922 from drowning.

She was a member of the Monday Afternoon Club and the Parent-Teacher Association of Bimghamton.

She died in the hospital in Philadelphia on July 16, 1926, after being sick for several weeks.

== Selected works ==
- Tales That Nimko Told
- The Spring Lady (1914)
- National Publications Containing Short Stories "Pennsylvania Dutch Series" by Mary Brecht Pulver; And Her Biography, Including a Collection of Her Verse and a Listing of Her Stories (1915),

=== Short stories ===
- "The Song Domestic"
- "The Path of Glory" in The Saturday Evening Post selected as among the "Best of American Short Stories"
- "Black Mountain"
- "The Secret"
- "Lucifer"
- "The Secret Phoenix of Syria"
- "The Amazon"
- "Heroic Treatment"
- "The Everlasting Eve"
- "The Man Who Was Sure of Himself"
- "Fortune's Favorites"

== Filmography ==
- The Man Hater (1917)
- The Man Who Was Afraid (1917)
