= A Heart to Let =

1921 film directed by Edward Dillon

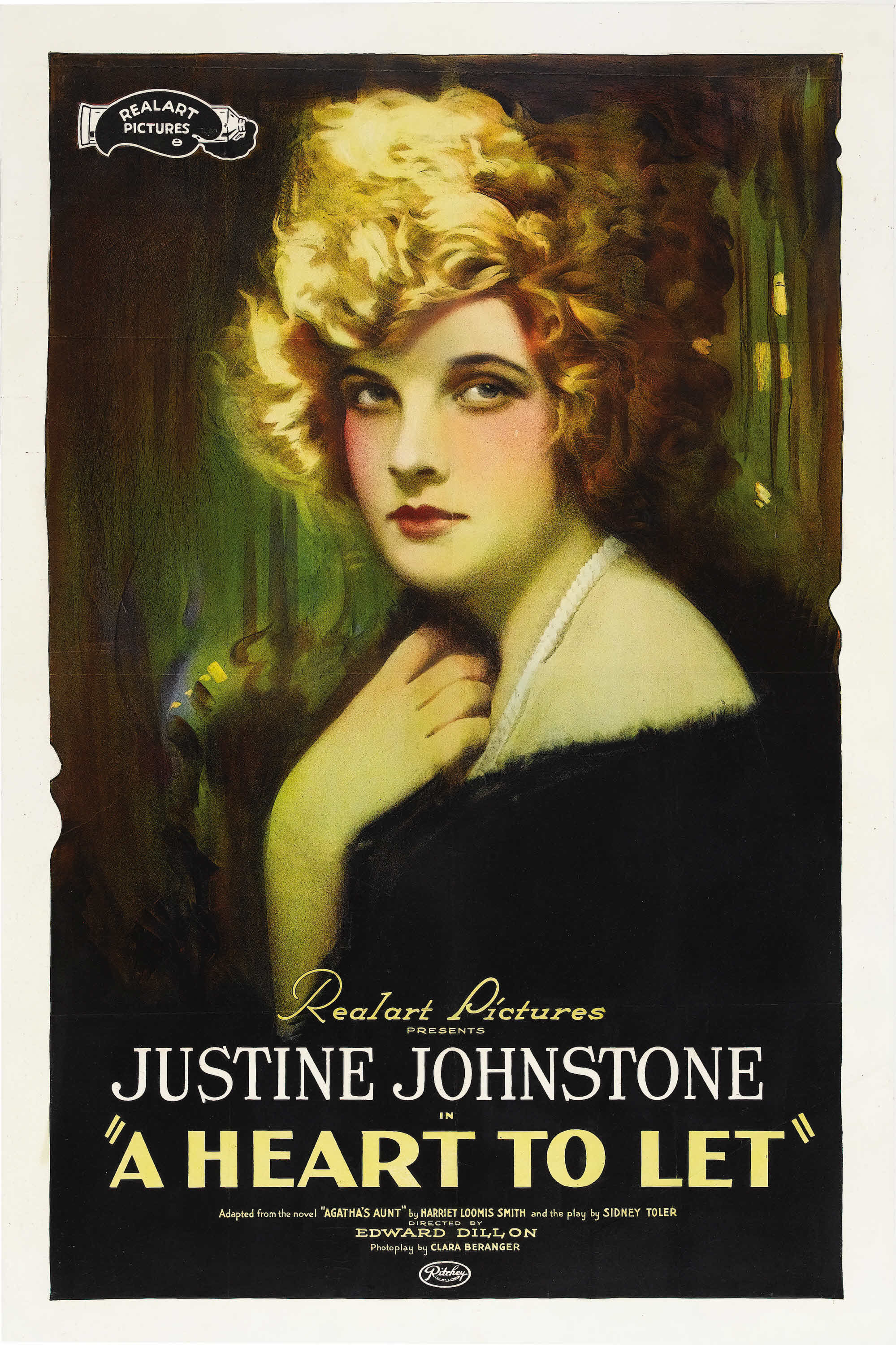
- Film poster
- Directed by: Edward Dillon
- Written by: Clara Beranger
- Based on: play, Agatha's Aunt, by Harriet Lummis Smith, Sidney Toler
- Produced by: Adolph Zukor(Realart)
- Starring: Justine Johnstone; Harrison Ford
- Cinematography: George J. Folsey
- Distributed by: Realart
- Release date: July 1921
- Running time: 5 reels
- Country: United States
- Language: Silent (English intertitles)

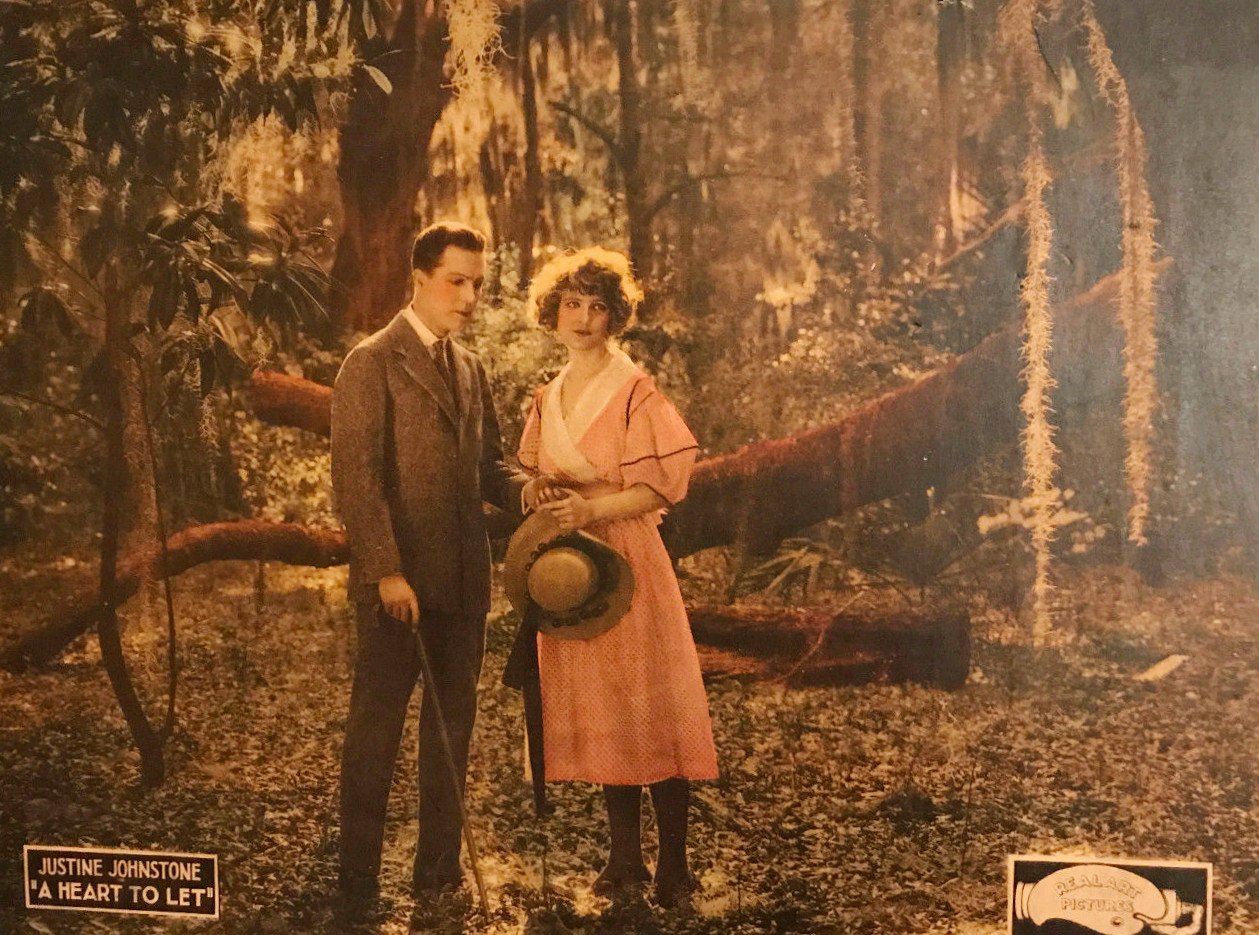
A Heart to Let, lobby card

A Heart to Let is a 1921 American silent drama film directed by Edward Dillon and starring Justine Johnstone. It was produced by Adolph Zukor offshoot production company Realart.

== Plot ==
Agatha inherits a southern estate, but cannot afford its upkeep. She then 'lets' or rents some of the rooms to boarders, one of whom is a blind man named Forbes. In an effort to fool Forbes and the other tenants into thinking there are several staff members, Agatha dons several disguises in an attempt to present a ruse. She eventually falls genuinely in love with Forbes who later regains his eyesight.

== Cast ==
- Justine Johnstone as Agatha
- Harrison Ford as Burton Forbes
- Marcia Harris as Zaida Kent
- Thomas Carr as Howard Kent
- Elizabeth Garrison as Mrs. Studley
- Winifred Bryson as Julia Studley
- Claude Cooper as Doolittle
- James Harrison as Warren

== Critical reception and preservation ==
Mae Tinee of the Chicago Tribune stated, "Technically the picture is well put over. If you feel thoughtful and Freudish, it won't make much a hit. But if you are in the mood for a bit of ribtickling, see A Heart to Let.

With no prints of A Heart to Let located in any film archives, it is considered a lost film.

== See also ==
- The Beguiled (1971)
- Candleshoe (1977) (David Niven dons several disguises in order to fool Helen Hayes into thinking there are several staff members when most have been fired because there are no funds.)
