= A Tailor Made Man =

1931 film

- Directed by: Sam Wood
- Written by: Gabor Dregely (novel); Harry James Smith (play); Edgar Allan Woolf (screenplay)
- Produced by: Harry Rapf
- Starring: William Haines; Dorothy Jordan
- Cinematography: Alfred Gilks
- Edited by: George Hively
- Distributed by: Metro-Goldwyn-Mayer
- Release date: March 28, 1931
- Running time: 79–80 minutes
- Country: United States
- Language: English

A Tailor Made Man is a 1931 American MGM pre-Code comedy film directed by Sam Wood. Adapted from the 1908 Hungarian play A Szerencse Fia by Gábor Drégely (staged in English in New York in 1917), the film stars William Haines and Dorothy Jordan.

On Broadway, Grant Mitchell starred in the 1917 production and a revival in 1929. The play was the basis for a 1922 American silent film, A Tailor-Made Man.

== Cast ==
- William Haines as John Paul Bart
- Dorothy Jordan as Tanya
- Joseph Cawthorn as Huber
- Marjorie Rambeau as Kitty Dupuy
- William Austin as Theodore Jellicott
- Ian Keith as Doctor Gustav von Sonntag
- Hedda Hopper as Mrs. Stanlaw
- Henry Armetta as Peter
- Walter Walker as Abraham Nathan
- Forrester Harvey as Arthur Pomeroy
- Joan Marsh as Bessie
- Martha Sleeper as Corrine
