= Love Finds the Way =

Play by Marguerite Merington

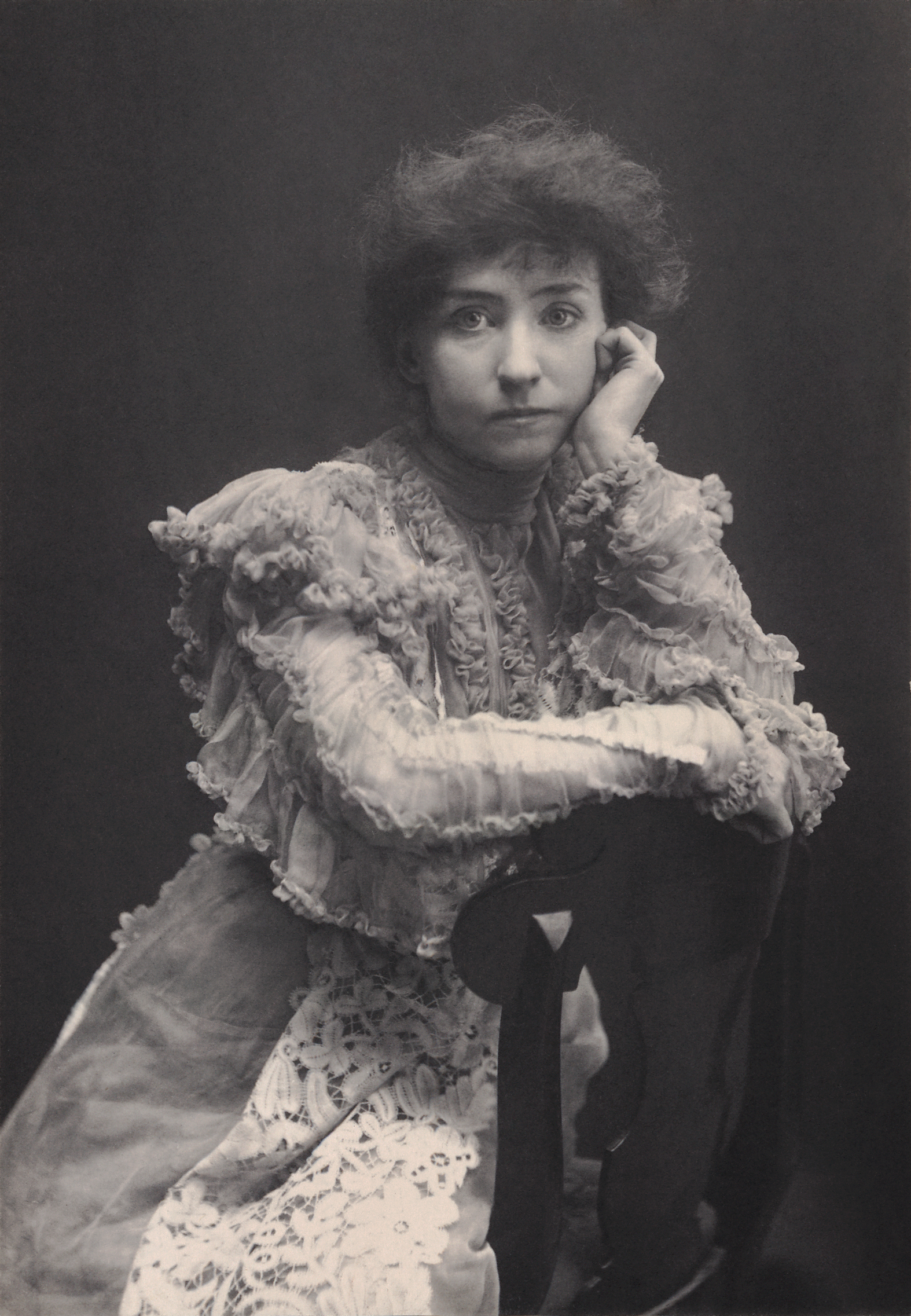
- Publicity photo of Minnie Maddern Fiske in Love Finds the Way
- Written by: Marguerite Merington
- Genre: Comedy drama

Premiere
- Date premiered: November 30, 1896
- Place premiered: Grand Opera House, Wilmington, Delaware

Love Finds the Way (originally titled The Right to Happiness) is a three-act play written by Marguerite Merington and first performed in 1896. Theatrical manager A. M. Palmer acquired the rights to a German play by Olga Wohlbrück, which Merington adapted into English. The adaptation debuted at the Grand Opera House in Wilmington, Delaware on November 30, 1896, with actress Minnie Maddern Fiske in the lead role. The title was changed to Love Finds the Way for Broadway, where it opened at the Fifth Avenue Theatre on April 11, 1898, with A Bit of Old Chelsea by Mrs. Oscar Beringer as a curtain raiser. (Fiske starred in both plays.) Love Finds the Way is a comedy-drama about a young woman who seeks romance despite an injury that has left her unhappy and alienated from her family.

== Cast and characters ==
The characters and cast from the Broadway production are given below:

Opening night cast
Character	Broadway cast
Doctor Lee	Frederic De Belleville
Douglas Colbert	Forrest Robinson
Raymond Winfield	Verner Clarges
Edgar Townsend	George Trader
Simon	Wilfrid North
William	Frank McCormack
Leslie	Lotta Linthicum
Mrs. Bessell	Sydney Cowell
Madeline Winfield	Minnie Maddern Fiske
Helen	Alberta Gallatin
Jane	Dorothy Chester
