= Justine Johnstone =

American stage and screen actress, and research pathologist (1895–1982)

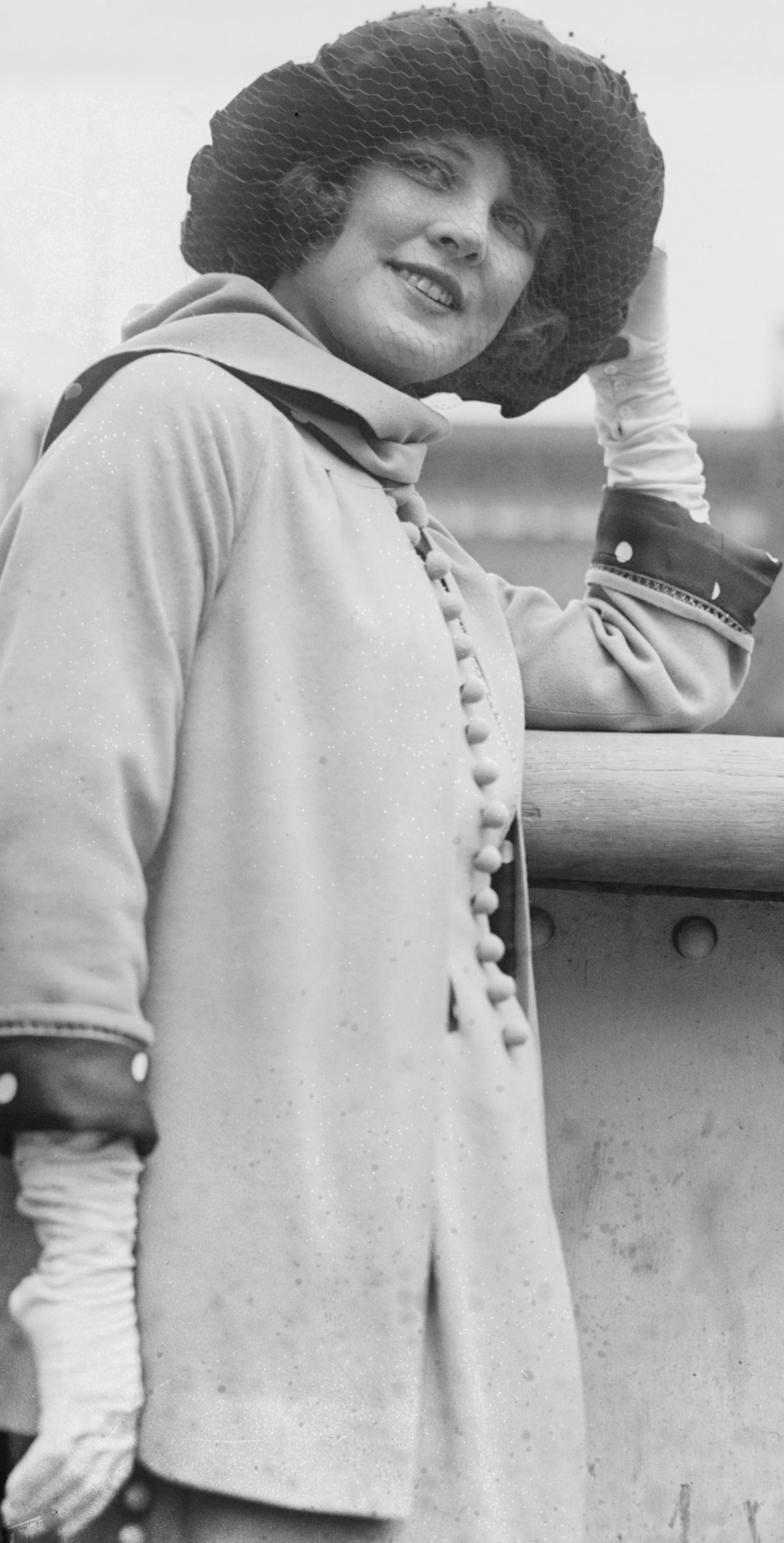
- Born: Justine Olive Johnstone; January 31, 1895; Englewood, New Jersey, U.S.
- Died: September 3, 1982 (aged 87); Santa Monica, California, U.S.
- Occupation(s): Actress, pathologist, scientist
- Spouse: Walter Wanger (m. 1919; div. 1938)
- Children: 2 (adopted)

Justine Olive Johnstone (Mrs. Walter Wanger; January 31, 1895 – September 4, 1982) was an American stage, and silent screen actress, turned pathologist. Working under her married name, she was part of the team that developed the modern intravenous drip technique.

== Early life ==
Johnstone attended Emma Willard School in Troy, New York. An account from a classmate's journal describes her classmates being awed by Johnstone and her acting career. This admiration led to her classmates nicknaming her Ju-jo. She was active in her school years as she was in the drama club and acted in the senior play; was an active editor of Gargoyle; and a member of the basketball team, glee club, operetta, and the choir. She briefly was a model during her time at Emma Willard as well.

== Acting career ==
Johnstone appeared in three Broadway shows between 1911 and 1914, then quit the business to finish high school at the Emma Willard School in Troy, New York. Upon her return to Broadway, she became a favorite performer for producers Charles Dillingham and Florenz Ziegfeld, who featured her in the 1915 and 1916 editions of the Ziegfeld Follies. Lee Shubert created the 1917 Broadway musical revue Over the Top for her, which featured Fred Astaire and his sister Adele Astaire in their Broadway debuts. In 1926, she retired from performing for private life. Johnstone married film producer Walter Wanger on September 13, 1919. They divorced in 1938, and she retained her married name. After her divorce, she adopted two sons.

== Medical career ==
When Johnstone's husband fell ill in 1927, his doctor, Samuel Hirschfeld, convinced her to enroll in science courses at Columbia University, where she studied plant research. Her work so impressed Harold T. Hyman, head of the science department of Columbia, that he and Hirschfeld hired her to work with them in their research. She joined the staff of the College of Physicians and Surgeons in 1929 as a research assistant in the pharmacology department.

She co-authored a paper with them concerning the development of the modern I.V. unit. Their key breakthrough was to slow down the rate of delivery and avoid what was then known as "speed shock" by introducing the now-ubiquitous drip technique. The three also conducted numerous experiments that led to the cure for syphilis.

During her time at Columbia, Johnstone co-authored (with a Dr. Blackberg) two other published papers. One dealt with the organization of resuscitation measures; the other with melanuria.

Later, Johnstone and her husband moved to Los Angeles, where as a research assistant to physicians she studied cancer and helped develop the discipline of endocrinology. To aid her research, she installed a laboratory in her house in Hollywood.

== Death ==
Justine Wanger died in Santa Monica, California from congestive heart failure, aged 87. Her remains are at Chapel of the Pines Crematory.

== Theatrical productions ==
- Watch Your Step (1914) as Estelle
- Ziegfeld Follies of 1915 (1915)
- Stop! Look! Listen! (1915) as Mary Singer
- Ziegfeld Follies of 1916 (1916)
- Betty (1916) as Chicquette
- Oh, Boy (1917) as Polly Andrus
- Over the Top (1917)
- Hush Money (1926) as Kathleen Forrest

== Filmography ==
- The Crucible (1914) (as Justina Johnstone) as Amelia (lost film)
- Nothing But Lies (1920) as Ann Nigh
- Blackbirds (1920) as Countess Leonie (lost film)
- The Plaything of Broadway (1921) as Lola
- Sheltered Daughters (1921) as Jenny Dark (presumably lost film)
- A Heart to Let (1921) as Agatha (lost film)
- Moonlight and Honeysuckle (1921) (uncredited) in Bit Part (lost film)
- Survivre (1923) as Viviane Termoise
- Never the Twain Shall Meet (1925) as Maisie Morrison (lost film)

== Published works ==
- Hirshfeld, Samuel; Hyman, Harold T.; Wanger, Justine (1931). "Influence of Velocity on the Response to Intravenous Injections". Archives of Internal Medicine. 47 (2): 218–228. doi:10.1001/archinte.1931.00140200095007.
- Blackberg, S. N.; Wanger, Justine (1932). "Studies in Revivification – Organization of Resuscitation Measures". The American Journal of the Medical Sciences. 183 (2): 241. doi:10.1097/00000441-193202000-00010.
- Blackberg, S. N.; Wanger, Justine (1933). "Melanuria". Journal of the American Medical Association. 100 (5): 334–336. doi:10.1001/jama.1933.02740050030009.

== See also ==
- Hedy Lamarr - another actress who worked in science and technology
