= Lotta Linthicum =

American actress (1870s – 1952)

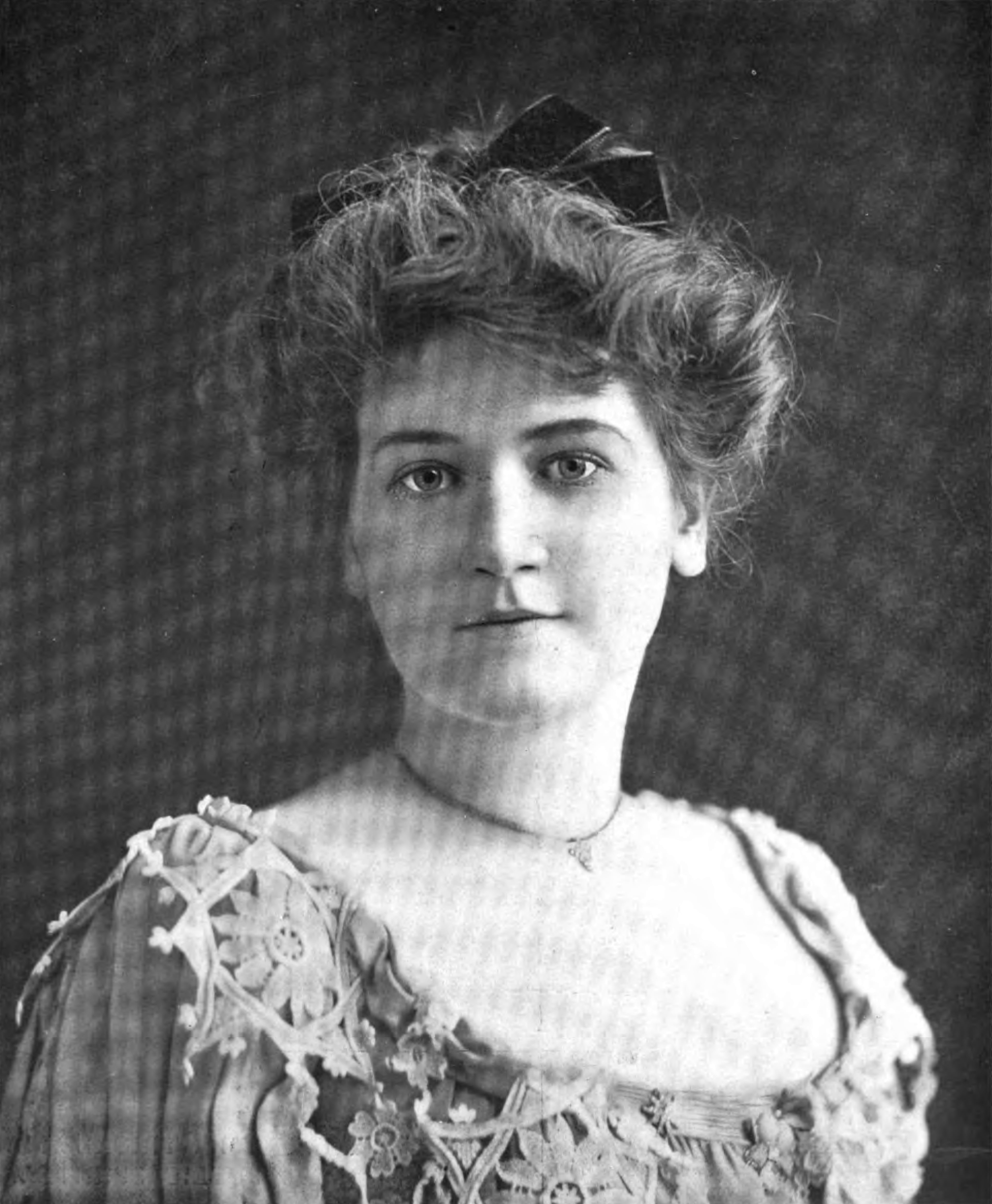
- Lotta Linthicum, from a 1904 publication.
- Born: Charlotte Linthicum; 1870s New York City
- Died: 1952; Port Chester, New York
- Other names: Lottie Linthicum, Lotte Linthicum, Lotta Lynn
- Occupation: actress

Lotta Linthicum (born in the 1870s, died 1952) was an American actress on Broadway.

== Early life ==
Lotta Linthicum was born in New York City, the daughter of William Oliver Linthicum and Julia Clark Bogardus Linthicum. After her father's death, she and her mother also lived in France and England, where Lotte trained in music, drama, and art. She was photographed by Alfred Stieglitz on one ocean crossing, in 1894. She and her mother had a home in Sconset, The Moorings, which was described as "a kind of social headquarters" for the summer colony of actors there, "full of unique souvenirs".

== Career ==
Lotta Linthicum had a long career on the stage, from the 1890s to the 1930s, mainly in London, Montreal, and New York. Broadway appearances by Lotta Linthicum included roles in Love Finds the Way (1898), The Royal Box (1898), Lady Rose's Daughter (1903), The Deserters (1910), Frou-Frou (1912), Cheer Up (1912–1913), A Tailor-Made Man (1917–1918, 1929), The Little Whopper (1919–1920), Blue Eyes (1921), Icebound (1923), The Shelf (1926), Piggy (1927), The Wild Man of Borneo (1927), Atlas and Eva (1928), Skyrocket (1929), Nice Women (1929), She Lived Next to the Firehouse (1931), and Papavert (1931–1932). She was also seen in other shows, including The Sign of the Cross (1896), Weather-Beaten Benson (1904), Skipper & Co. (1911) Madame Sherry (1913), The Crinoline Girl (1914), Don't Do It Dodo (1936), and the suffrage production A Pageant of Protests.

Linthicum traveled with pet dogs, especially of the pug and Pomeranian breeds. She also bred Pomeranians, and showed her dogs in competitions.

== Personal life ==
Lotta Linthicum married three times. Her first husband was fellow actor James William Bankson; they married in 1899, and he died of typhoid in 1900, at age 22. Bankson was violent towards Linthicum, enough to cause public comment and police involvement. Her second husband was William Cantwell Strachan, a Canadian theatre professional; they married in 1905, and divorced in 1913. Her third husband was Armor W. Barbour (they married about 1915). Her later years saw her in financial straits; her art and other belongings were auctioned over time. She died in Port Chester, New York, in 1952, when she was about eighty years old.
