= A Tailor-Made Man (play) =

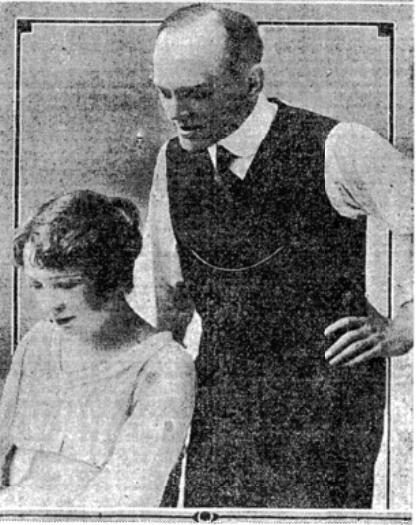
- Helen MacKellar and Grant Mitchell in a scene
- Written by: Harry James Smith
- Setting: 1916, New York City

Premiere
- Date: August 27, 1917
- Place: Cohan and Harris Theatre

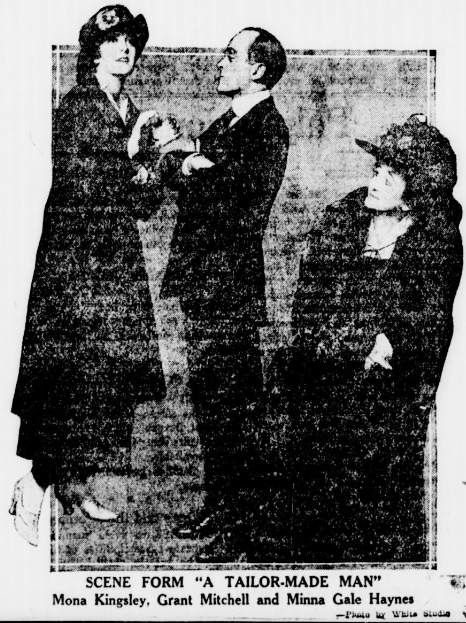
Mitchell, Mona Kingsley, and Minna Gale Haynes in scene from play

A Tailor-Made Man is a 1917 American play by Harry James Smith, which ran for 398 performances at the Cohan and Harris Theatre. It debuted on August 27, 1917, and played through August 1918.

The play was adapted from the 1908 Hungarian play A Szerencse Fia ("Son of Luck") by Gábor Drégely. The Playbill and press referred to Dregely's play as The Well-Fitting Dress Coat, which derives from the play's German title (Der gutsitzende Frack), so presumably Smith worked from that translation.

Grant Mitchell starred in the 1917 Broadway production, which was staged by Sam Forrest, and in an October 1929 revival. The play ran for just shy of an entire year at the Cohan and Harris Theatre in New York. The play was Smith's greatest success, but he did not live to see the full run, as he died in a train and automobile accident in March 1918 while working for the Red Cross.

Actor Theodore Friebus, who played Dr. Sonntag, died in the wings during a performance on December 26, 1917, while awaiting his second act cue. The thirty-eight year-old actor succumbed to heart disease; an understudy finished that night's performance.

The play later led to a 1922 silent film and 1931 film.

== Original Broadway cast ==
(In order of appearance)

- Mr. Huber as Gus Weinberg
- Mr. Rowlands as L.E. Conness
- Peter as Barlowe Borland
- Dr. Gustavus Sonntag as Theodore Friebus
- Tanya Huber as Helen MacKellar
- John Paul Bart as Grant Mitchell
- Pomeroy as Rowland Buckstone
- Mrs. Stanlaw as Minna Gale Haynes
- Mr. Stanlaw as Harry Harwood
- Corinne Stanlaw as Mona Kingsley
- Dorothy as Adrienne Bonnelli
- Bobby Westlake as Lloyd Carpenter
- Mr. Fleming as John Wall
- Mr. Crane as John Maccabee
- Mr. Carroll as Douglas Farne
- Mrs. Fitzmorris as Josephine Deffry
- Wheating as Frank G. Harley
- Mrs. Kittie Dupuy as Lotta Linthicum
- Bessie Dupuy as Nancy Power
- Mr. Jellicott as A.P. Kaye
- Abraham Nathan as Frank Burbeck
- Miss Shayne as Gladys Gilbert
- Mr. Grayson as Leonard White
- Mr. Whitcombe as Howard Wall
- Mr. Russell (labor delegate) as John A. Boone
- Mr. Cain (labor delegate) as J.H. Greene
- Mr. Flynn (labor delegate) as William C. Hodges
