= Harrison Grey Fiske =

American dramatist

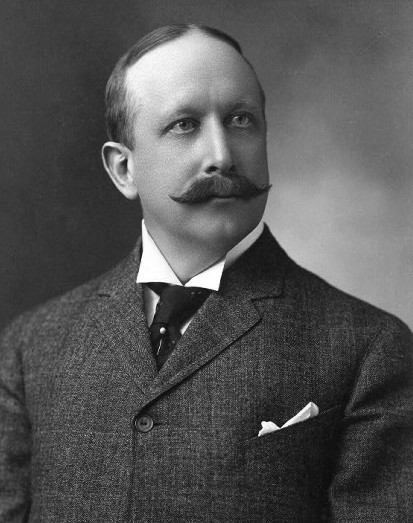
- Fiske featured on a postcard c. 1895
- Born: July 30, 1861; Harrison, New York, U.S.
- Died: September 2, 1942 (aged 81); New York City, U.S.
- Education: New York University
- Occupations: Journalist, playwright, theatre manager, Broadway producer
- Organizations: New York Dramatic Mirror; Actors' Fund of America; Manhattan Theatre
- Known for: Disrupting the monopoly of the Theatrical Syndicate
- Notable work: Tess of the d'Urbervilles (1897); Kismet (1911)
- Spouse: Minnie Maddern Fiske

Harrison Grey Fiske (July 30, 1861 – September 2, 1942) was an American journalist, playwright and Broadway producer who fought against the monopoly of the Theatrical Syndicate, a management company that dominated American stage bookings around the turn of the twentieth century.

== Life and career ==
Fiske was born in Harrison, New York, an affluent suburb in Westchester County just thirty minutes from New York City. The second of three sons of the wealthy hotel owner Lyman Fiske and his wife Jennie Maria (Durfee) Fiske, both of seventeenth-century Massachusetts descent, Fiske was still a young boy when his family moved into New York City, and he maintained a strong identity as a New Yorker for much of his life. As a young boy, Fiske was educated by private tutors and showed a strong interest in the arts. He recalled being taken to see his first play at Barnum's Museum at an early age and afterwards receiving the gift of a puppet theatre from his father. Later, whilst attending Mrs. Vanderhoff's School he became exposed to Shakespeare through dramatic readings given by the headmistress's husband. Likewise, he had also been giving a small printing press and, as a boy, he had begun printing his own monthly paper. Fiske next enrolled at Dr. Chapin's Collegiate School for Boys, a college preparatory school on Madison Avenue where he continued to pursue writing. Upon finishing there, he traveled for a summer in Europe and then entered New York University in 1878. There he was asked to sign a pledge to forsake dens of iniquity like theaters, taverns, dance halls, and billiard rooms. Fiske subsequently admitted that he and his friends kept their fingers crossed when it came to attending theaters.

At college, Fiske often wrote short stories and sketches for magazines and soon became an editorial writer and dramatic critic for the daily newspaper the Jersey City Argus. He later served in a similar capacity for the New York Star, which set the stage in 1879 for what would turn out to be a 32-year affiliation with the popular trade magazine the New York Dramatic Mirror. After achieving success as a contributor to the Dramatic Mirror, Fiske decided to leave college after his freshman year with hopes of becoming a journalist. At his behest, Fiske's father bought an interest in the Dramatic Mirror, and made his son (then eighteen) the editor. In 1883 Fiske assumed a controlling interest in the Mirror and by 1888 was sole owner of the Mirror Newspaper Company.

With an inside look into the theatrical profession, Fiske's view of the arts changed dramatically. He was continually distressed by the plight of out-of-work actors and by the "laissez-faire practices of the American stage." Fiske determined to turn the Dramatic Mirror into a sort of artistic and professional conscience for the American theater, writing editorials on not only the aesthetic merits of theatrical productions, but also the improvement of working conditions and the regulation of health hazards in theaters. Though he disapproved of industry efforts to organize an actors' union, Fiske did help to secure the passage of the Cummings Act of 1896 and subsequent laws to protect playwrights against literary piracy. He was also instrumental in the establishment of the Actors' Fund of America. With the help of his wife, the celebrated actress Minnie Maddern, as well as the likes of David Belasco, Sarah Bernhardt and the Shubert family staged a coup on the Theatrical Syndicate, helping to break the stranglehold they had maintained on theater bookings from coast to coast.

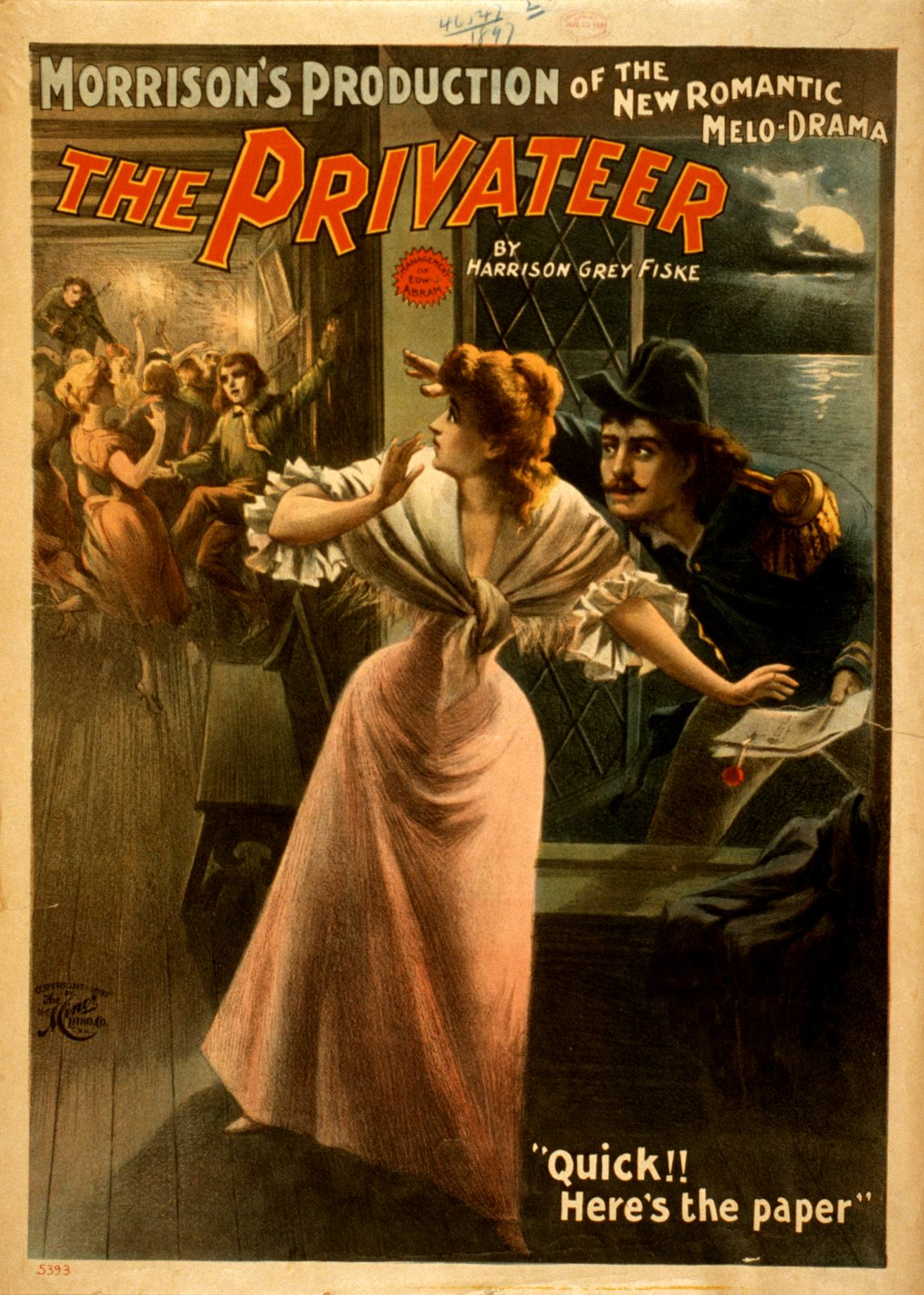
Poster for The Privateer

In 1901 Fiske leased the Manhattan Theatre on Thirty-Third Street as a showcase for his wife and as a venue for other artists. The theater became home to the "Manhattan Company" whose players included the well-known actors Tyrone Power Sr., George Arliss and John B. Mason.

Over the course of his career, Fiske produced more than 140 plays, many of which he wrote or directed including Hester Crewe (1893), The Privateer (1903), and The Queen of Liars (1896) adapted from a play by Alphonse Daudet and Léon Hennique. He is perhaps best known for his 1911 production of Edward Knoblauch’s Kismet starring Otis Skinner.

== Marriage ==
On March 19, 1890, Harrison Fiske married actress Minnie Maddern at Larchmont Manor. He first saw her when at the age of twelve he attended a local production of King John in which his eight-year-old future bride played a boy's part. Their paths crossed once again a few years later, but were not formally introduced until she was nearly twenty. Mrs. Fiske, as she was often professionally known, appeared in a number of plays directed by her husband, including Tess of the d'Urbervilles, Salvation Neil, Becky Sharp and Mary of Magdala. The two remained together until her death in 1932.

== Death ==
Fiske died at the age of 81, as a result of a heart attack, at his New York apartment on West Sixty-Six Street. He had retired around the time of his wife's death and was working on his memoirs at the time of his passing.
