= Minnie Maddern Fiske =

American dramatist (1865–1932)

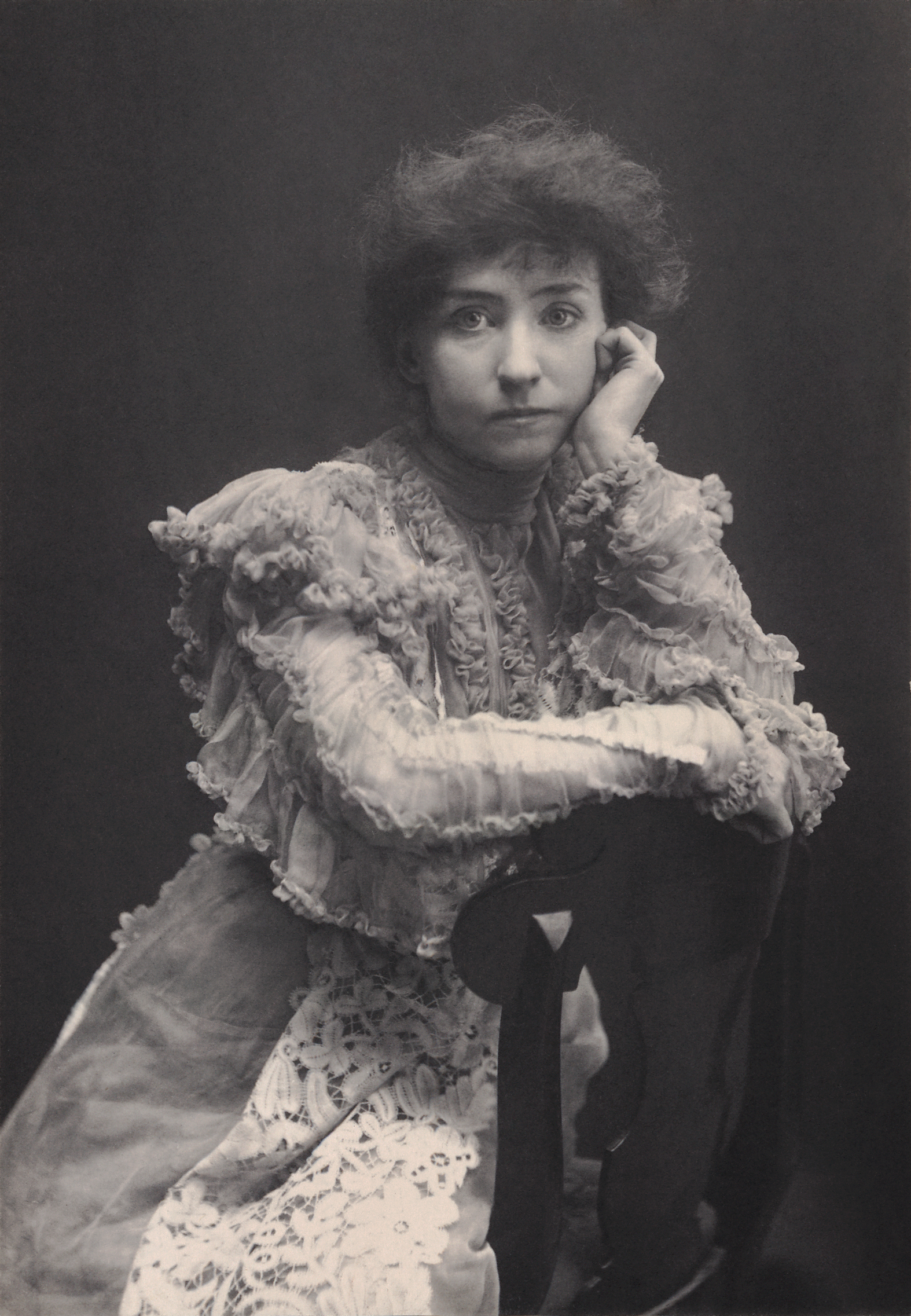
- Mrs. Fiske in Love Finds the Way by Zaida Ben-Yusuf (1896)
- Born: Marie Augusta Davey; December 19, 1865; New Orleans, Louisiana, U.S.
- Died: February 15, 1932 (aged 66); Queens, New York City, U.S.
- Other name: Mrs. Fiske
- Occupations: Actress; playwright
- Spouses: LeGrand White (m. 1882; div. 1888) Harrison Grey Fiske (m. 1890)
- Relatives: Emily Stevens (cousin)

Minnie Maddern Fiske (born Marie Augusta Davey; December 19, 1865 (Note: with some sources quoting December 19, 1864, as her date of birth) – February 15, 1932), but often billed simply as Mrs. Fiske, was one of the leading American actresses of the late 19th and early 20th century. She also spearheaded the fight against the Theatrical Syndicate for the sake of artistic freedom. She was widely considered the most important actress on the American stage in the first quarter of the 20th century. Her performances in several Henrik Ibsen plays helped introduce American audiences to the Norwegian playwright. She was also an influential campaigner for improving animal welfare.

== Career ==
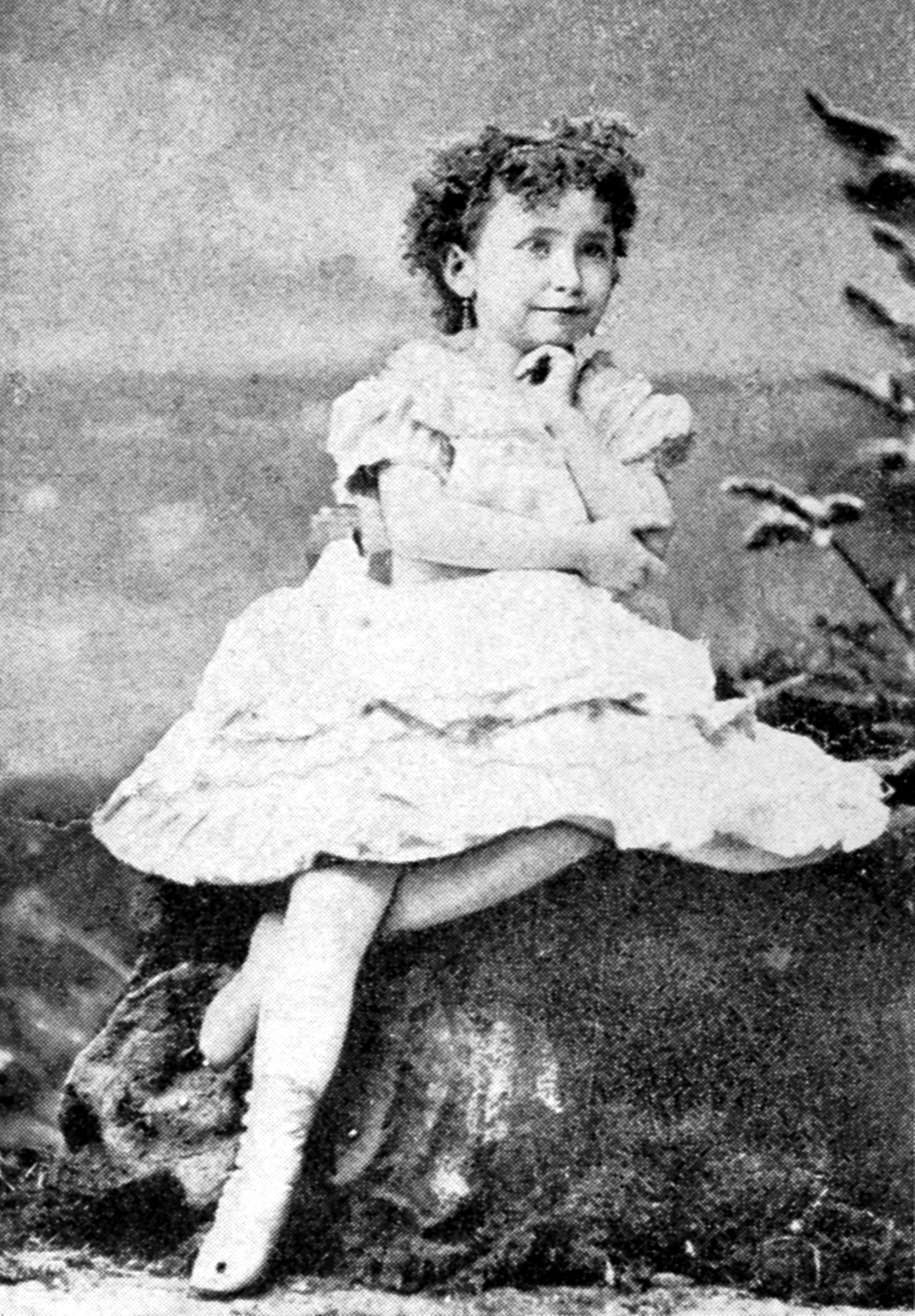
Minnie Maddern at age four, a year after her stage debut

Born in New Orleans, Louisiana, Minnie Maddern was the daughter of stage manager Thomas Davey and actress Lizzie Maddern. Coming from a theatrical family, she performed her first professional show at the age of three as the Duke of York in Richard III. She debuted in New York as a four-year-old in the play A Sheep in Wolf's Clothing. She toured extensively as a child, and was educated in many convent schools. She was a child prodigy, touring and performing in numerous productions. According to the New York Times article "Ibsen or Shakespeare?" (March 18, 1928), Harrison Grey Fiske was 12 years old when he first set eyes on the future Mrs. Fiske—she was but eight, performing in a Shakespearean role. Her pay was in lollipops.

By the time she was 16, she was a leading lady, and was cast in the leading role of Chip in the play Fogg's Ferry. She was recognized for her unique beauty and singing voice. Maddern starred in the Hanover Opera House's grand opening on September 12, 1887 in "Caprice." She married LeGrand White, a theater musician in Fogg's Ferry, but they divorced shortly thereafter. Two years later, she married Harrison Grey Fiske in March 1890, and took three years off from the stage. Leaving a life of domesticity, she returned to the theatre in 1893 as a playwright and director, having written one-act plays such as A Light for St. Agnes, The Rose, and The Eyes of the Heart. She wrote several plays and collaborated with her husband in writing Fontenelle. Mr. Fiske directed virtually all of his wife's plays after their marriage.

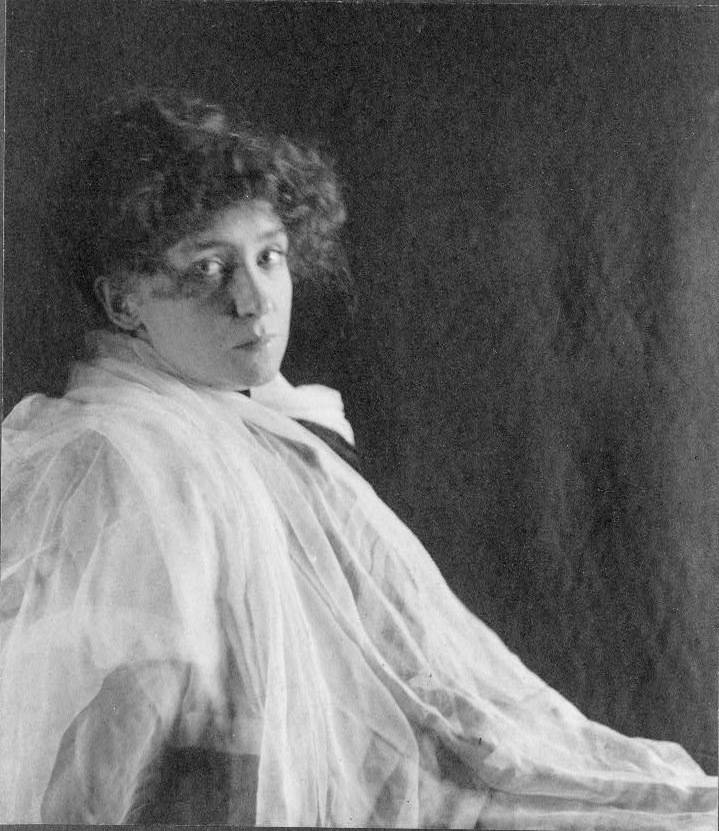
Photograph by Fred Holland Day

After her husband's unsuccessful production of Hester Crewe, Minnie Maddern debuted as Nora in A Doll's House by Henrik Ibsen, at the Empire Theatre in New York, launching Ibsen's career because of her outstanding performance. She is perhaps most famous for starring as Becky Sharp in the original 1899 production of Langdon Mitchell's Becky Sharp, a play based on William Makepeace Thackeray's Vanity Fair. Among her many triumphs on the Broadway stage were: Tess of the d'Urbervilles (1897, revival 1902), Love Finds the Way (1898), Becky Sharp (1899, revivals 1904, 1911), A Doll's House (1902), Hedda Gabler (1903, revival 1904), Leah Kleschna (1904–05), Salvation Nell (1908–09), The High Road (1912–13), Madame Sand (1917–18), a play about George Sand; Mis' Nelly of N'Orleans (1919), Helena's Boys (1924), Ghosts (1927), Ladies of the Jury (1929–30), as well as her self-written plays The Rose (1905), The Eyes of the Heart (1905), A Light from St. Agnes (1906). Mrs. Fiske starred in everything from farce to tragedy and even appeared in a comedy with puppets Wake Up, Jonathan! (1921). Her final appearance on Broadway was in 1930 in an acclaimed production of The Rivals cast as Mrs. Malaprop.

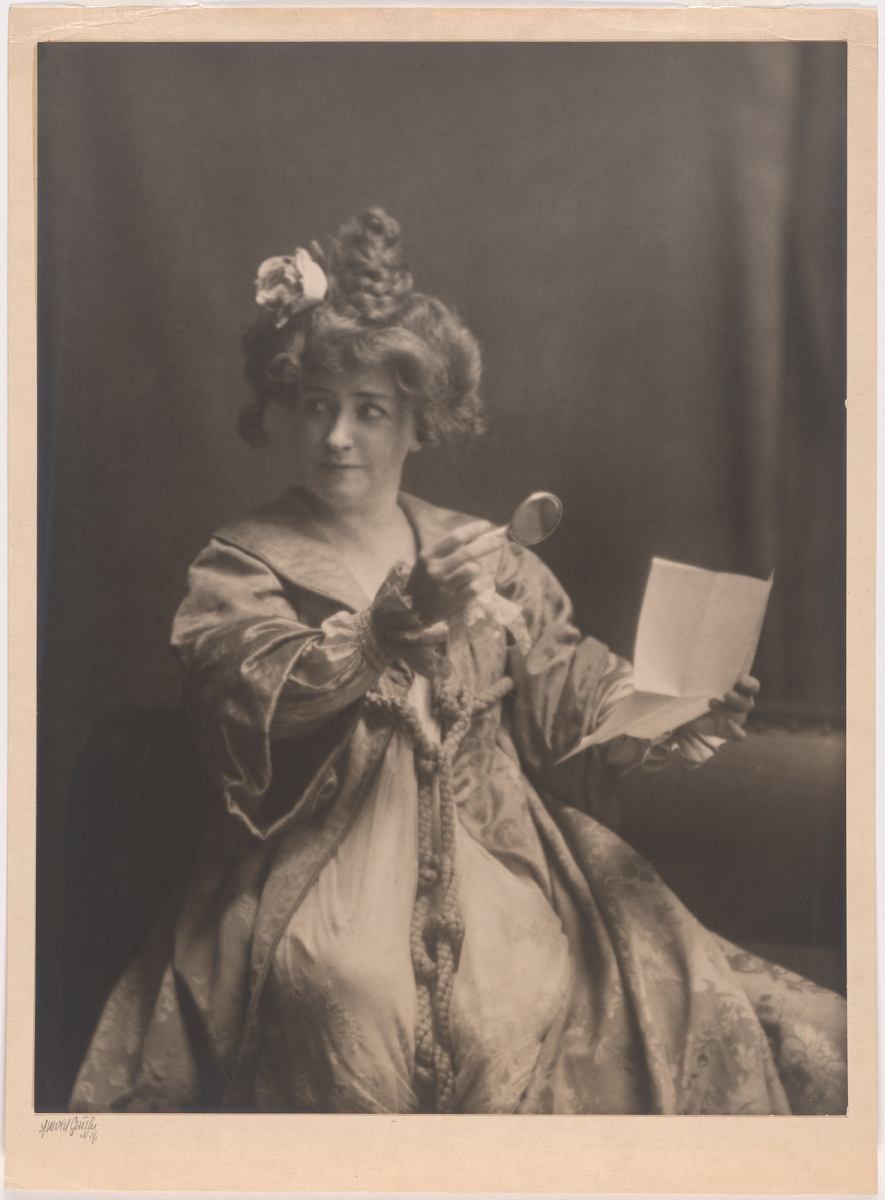
Minnie Maddern Fiske

In the mid-1910s, Mrs. Fiske starred in two feature film adaptions of two of her greatest stage triumphs: Tess of the d'Urbervilles in 1913 and Vanity Fair in 1915, both of which were surprisingly successful with moviegoers, although she felt she was not at her best in the medium and declined further film work.

She was a pioneer for realism in acting, supporting Ibsen's works for their honest portrayals of humanity. Her love for performing Ibsen over Shakespeare, and her position that Ibsen is the better study for actors, can not be overstated. She told The New York Times in January 1908:

Ibsen is of interest to the actor because properly to understand a role you must study the character from its earliest childhood. Most Ibsen men and women have lived their lives before the curtain rises. Shakespeare has often been pronounced tedious by actors because his characters require a great deal of study. But even Shakespeare seems easy when compared with the thought that must be bestowed upon Ibsen. The beautiful verse, the wonderful character drawing of Shakespeare furnish solutions of perplexing problems, but Ibsen is so elusive. He fascinates by his aloofness. He is the Wagner of the drama. Wagner struggled for understanding just as Ibsen has struggled.

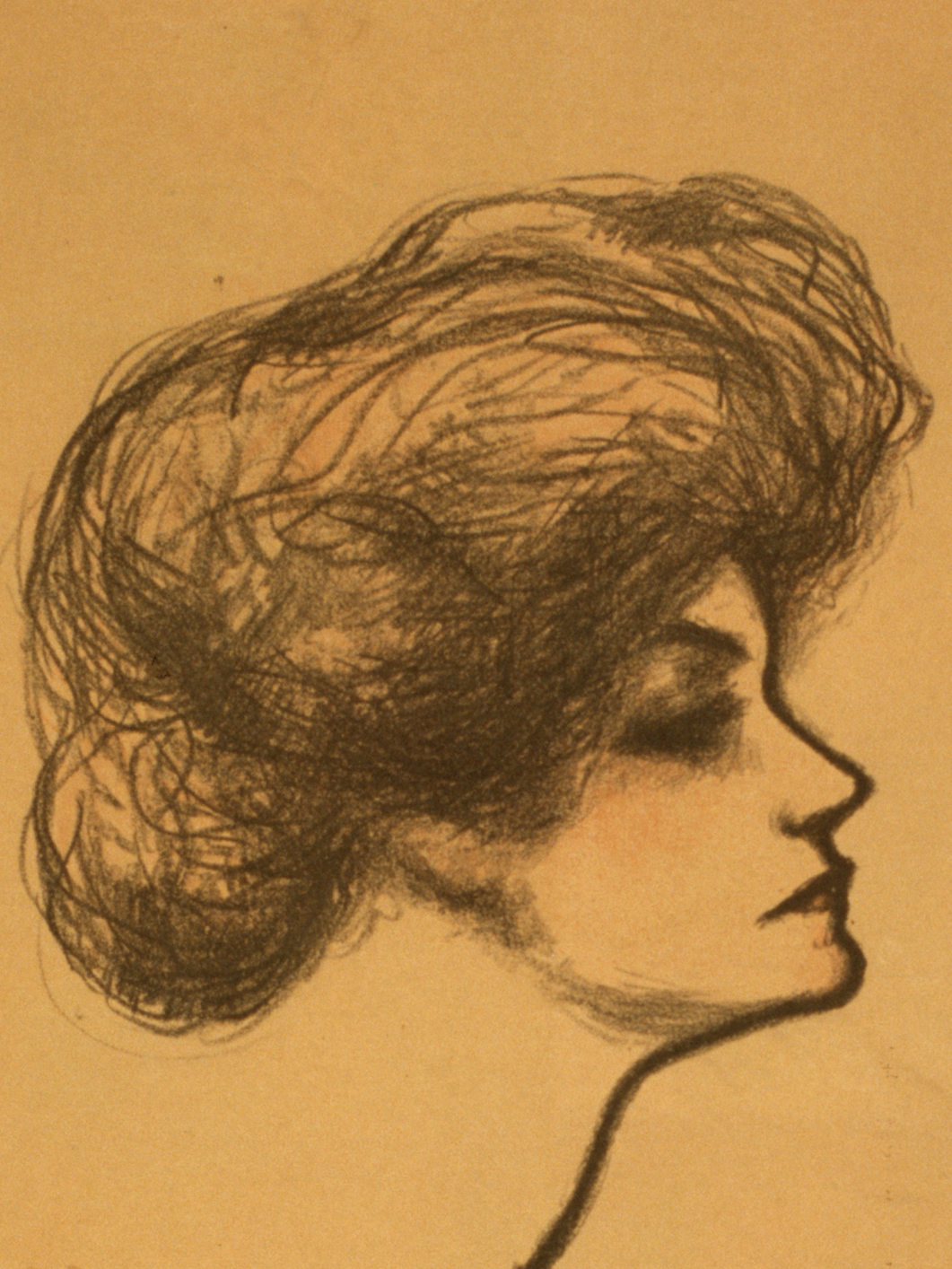
Minnie Maddern Fiske as drawn by her cousin Ernest Haskel circa 1900

In 1916, in Harpers Weekly, Fiske published the first article to consider Charlie Chaplin as a serious artist. "It will surprise numbers of well-meaning Americans," Fiske wrote,

to learn that a constantly increasing body of cultured, artistic people are beginning to regard the young British buffoon, Charles Chaplin, as an extraordinary artist as well as a comic genius. Many thoughtful persons are beginning to analyze the Chaplin performances to discover his secret. It is the old, familiar secret of inexhaustible imagination, governed by the unfailing precision of a perfect technique.

Although she was highly praised as an actor, she died poverty-stricken, having fought against a group of producers that organized the Theatrical Trust or Syndicate. This organization took control of first-class playhouses in the U.S., dictated the plays chosen, and the actors that were cast. She fought for artistic freedom for 12 years, which caused her to perform in third-class theatres, such as churches and skating rinks.

== Animal welfare ==
In addition to her battle against the Syndicate, she was also one of the most prominent animal welfare advocates of her era. She took interest in the activities of the American Society for the Prevention of Cruelty to Animals and other humane leagues. She was known to have picked up stray dogs and cared for them. She fought against the wearing of the plumes of snowy and great egrets on hats, raised awareness of the cruelties of fur trapping, and changed the treatment of cattle on ranges. She was quoted as saying "there can be no real civilization which does not take with consideration justice to animals".

Fiske became a member of the Animal Rescue League of Boston in 1902. She was a member of the New York State Anti-Vivisection Society and an honorary life member of Bideawee. Fiske was associated with Emarel Freshel's Millennium Guild and was Honorary Chairman of the American Humane Association's Humane Trapping Committee. She became a vegetarian in 1904 and refused to wear fur for ethical reasons. She was also an opponent of vivisection.

Because she was well-known and loved, people followed her example and she was able to broadly influence animal reform. She was twice named one of the twelve greatest living American women because of her fight for animal rights and for her outstanding talent. She was first named in 1923 by the League of Women Voters, and then again in 1931 by Good Housekeeping magazine. Mark Twain wrote the story "A Horse's Tale" at her request to combat bullfighting in Spain.

== Death ==
Fiske died from congestive heart failure at the age of 66 in Queens, New York. She and Harrison had no children. Around 1915, the couple adopted an infant boy who would have been a teen at Mrs. Fiske's death in 1932. Fiske's death was kept a secret for 24 hours. Her husband Harrison commented that "she desired as little ceremony as possible and her wishes will be followed. Her instructions were very definite". Her body was cremated.

== Family ==
Actress Emily Stevens was her cousin, as was Elizabeth Maddern, the first wife of author Jack London; she was also related to stage actress Merle Maddern. Robert Stevens, for 23 years the director of the Rochester Community Players, and brother to Emily Stevens, was also a cousin.

== Legacy and honors ==
During World War II, the Liberty ship SS Minnie M. Fiske was built in Panama City, Florida, and named in her honor.

In 1961, her papers (23,000 items, weighing in at 1,400 pounds) were donated to the United States Library of Congress.

== Selected theater appearances ==
- Hunted Down by Dion Boucicault, New York (1871)
- Fogg's Ferry by Charles Callahan, Wisconsin (1882)
- Juanita by Charles Callahan, Illinois (1883)
- Caprice by Howard P. Taylor, Missouri (1884)
- In Spite of it All by Victorien Sardou, New York (1885)
- Hester Crewe by Harrison Grey Fiske, New York (1893)
- A Doll's House by Henrik Ibsen, New York (1894)
- This Picture and That! by Brander Matthews, Texas (1896)
- Cesarine by Alexandre Dumas, fils, Pennsylvania (1896)
- Marie Deloche (orig. The Queen of Liars, 1895) by Harrison Grey Fiske, New York (1896)
- A Doll's House, New York (1896)
- A Light From St. Agnes by Minnie Maddern Fiske, New York (1896)
- Cesarine, Illinois (1896)
- Divorcons by Victorien Sardou, Illinois (1896)
- The Right to Happiness by Marguerite Merington, Louisiana (1896)
- Tess of D'Urbervilles by Lorimer Stoddard, New York (1897)
- Little Italy one act by Horace B. Fry with Divorcons, Illinois (1898)
- Magda by Hermann Sudermann, New York (1898)
- A Bit of Old Chelsea by Mrs. Oscar Beringer, New York (1898)
- Love Finds the Way by Marguerite Merrington, New York (1898)
- Becky Sharp by Langdon Mitchell, New York (1899)
- Frou Frou by Henri Meilhac and Ludovic Halevy, New York (1899)
- Miranda of the Balcony by Anne Crawford Flexner, New York (1901)
- The Unwelcome Mrs. Hatch by Mrs. Burton Harrison, New York (1901)
- A Bit of Old Chelesa, New York (1902)
- Tess of D' Urbervilles, New York (1902)
- A Doll's House by Henrik Ibsen, New York (1902)
- Little Italy and Divorcons, New York (1902)
- Mary of Magdala by Paul Heyse, New York (1902)
- Hedda Gabler by Henrik Ibsen, New York (1903)
- Becky Sharp, New York (1904)
- Hedda Gabler, New York (1904)
- Leah Kleschna by C.M.S. McLellan, New York (1904)
- Three One Act Plays by Minnie Maddern Fiske: The Rose, A Light From St. Agnes, The Eyes of the Heart (1905)
- The New York Idea by Langdon Mitchell, New York (1906)
- Tess of the D'Urbervilles, Louisiana (1907)
- Leah Kleschna, Louisiana (1907)
- Rosmersholm by Henrik Ibsen, New York (1907)
- Salvation Nell by Edward Sheldon, New York (1908)
- The Pillars of Society by Henrik Ibsen, New York (1910)
- The Green Cockatoo by Arthur Schnitzler, New York (1910)
- Hannele by Gerhart Hauptmann, New York (1910)
- Becky Sharp, New York (1911)
- Mrs. Bumpstead-Leigh by Harry James Smith, New York (1911)
- The New Marriage by Langdon Mitchell, New York (1911)
- Julia France by Gertrude Atherton, Toronto, Canada (1912)
- Lady Patricia by Rudolf Frohman, New York (1912)
- The High Road by Edward Sheldon, Montreal, Canada (1912)
- The High Road, Massachusetts (1913)
- Mrs Bumpstead-Leigh, New Jersey (1914)
- Lady Betty Martingale by John Luther Long and Frank Stayon (1914)
- Erstwhile Susan by Marian de Forest, Massachusetts (1916)
- Madame Sand by Philip Moeller, New York (1917)
- Service by Henri Lavedan, translated by William C. Taylor, New York (1918)
- Out There by J. Hartley Manners, allstar play toured America to raise funds for The Red Cross (1918)
- Mis' Nelly of N' Orleans by Lawrence Eyre, New York (1919)
- Wake Up, Jonathan! by Hatcher Hughes and Elmer Rice, New York (1921)
- The Dice of the Gods by Lillian Barrett, Illinois (1923)
- Mary, Mary Quite Contrary by St. John Ervine, New York (1923)
- Helena's Boys by Ida Lublenski Ehrlich, New York (1923)
- The Rivals by Richard Brinsley Sheridan, Massachusetts (1925)
- Ghosts by Henrik Ibsen, New York (1927)
- The Merry Wives of Windsor by William Shakespeare, New York (1928)
- Much Ado About Nothing by William Shakespeare, Pennsylvania (1928)
- Mrs. Bumpstead-Leigh, New York (1929)
- Ladies of the Jury by Fred Ballard, New York (1929)
- It's a Grand Life by Hatcher Hughes and Alan Williams, New York (1930)
- The Rivals, New York (1930)
- Ladies of the Jury, Illinois (1931)
- Mrs. Bumpstead-Leigh, California (1932)
- Against the Wind by Carlos Drake, Illinois (1933)

== Publications ==
- Binns, Archie, Mrs Fiske and the American Theatre. New York: Crown Publishers, 1955.
- Brown, Thomas Allston, A History of the New York Stage From the First Performance in 1732 to 1901, vol. III, New York: Dodd, Mead & Company, 1903.
- Chapman, John, and Garrison P. Sherwood, eds., The Best Plays of 1894–1899, New York: Dodd, Mead, & Company, 1955.
- Anne L. Fliotsos; Wendy Vierow (2008). American Women Stage Directors of the Twentieth Century. University of Illinois Press. pp. 168–178. ISBN 978-0-252-03226-4.
- Hapgood, Norman, The Stage in America, 1897–1900, Norwood, Mass.: The Macmillan Company, 1901.
- "Ibsen or Shakespeare?", New York Times, Sunday, March 18, 1928. Section 9, pg.4
- Mantle, Burns, and Garrison P. Sherwood, eds., The Best Plays of 1899–1909, Philadelphia: The Blakiston Company, 1944.
- Frederic Edward McKay; Charles Edgar Lewis Wingate (1896). Famous American Actors of To-Day. New York: T.Y. Crowell. pp. 328–340. "Minnie Maddern Fiske."
- Lewis Clinton Strang (1899). Famous Actresses of the Day in America. Boston: L.C. Page and Company. pp. 49–68. "Minnie Maddern Fiske."
- Winter, William, The Wallet of Time, Volumes One and Two, New York: Moffat, Yard and Company, 1913.
- Alexander Woollcott (1917). Mrs. Fiske: Her views on actors, acting, and the problems of production. New York: The Century Co. "Minnie Maddern Fiske."
