= A Tailor-Made Man (1922 film) =

1922 film by Joe De Grasse

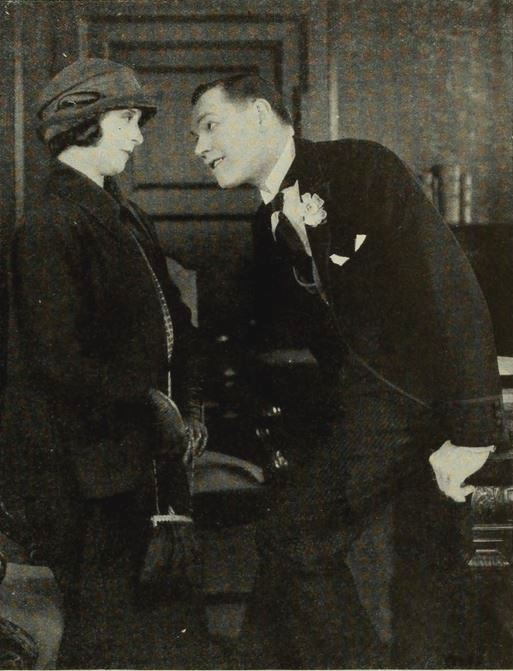
- Ethel Grandin and Charles Ray in a scene from the film
- Directed by: Joseph De Grasse
- Screenplay by: Albert Ray
- Based on: A Tailor-Made Man; 1917 play by Harry James Smith
- Produced by: Charles Ray
- Starring: Charles Ray; Tom Ricketts; Ethel Grandin; Victor Potel; Stanton Heck; Edythe Chapman
- Cinematography: George Meehan; George Rizard
- Edited by: Harry L. Decker
- Production company: Charles Ray Productions
- Distributed by: United Artists
- Release date: August 5, 1922
- Running time: 90 minutes
- Country: United States
- Language: Silent (English intertitles)

A Tailor-Made Man is a 1922 American silent comedy film directed by Joseph De Grasse and written by Albert Ray. The film stars Charles Ray, Tom Ricketts, Ethel Grandin, Victor Potel, Stanton Heck, and Edythe Chapman, with a supporting cast including Jacqueline Logan and Kate Lester. It was released on August 5, 1922, by United Artists and premiered in Los Angeles around the same date. The film, based on the 1917 play A Tailor-Made Man by Harry James Smith, survives in the archives of Gosfilmofond of Russia.

== Plot ==
John Paul Bart (Charles Ray), a lowly pants presser in Anton Huber’s (Tom Ricketts) tailor shop, believes that fine clothing can transform a person’s status and opportunities. Determined to test this theory, he "borrows" an elegant suit from the shop and attends an exclusive reception hosted by the wealthy Stanlaw family. Despite his lack of social standing, John’s charm and borrowed attire catch the eye of Abraham Nathan (Stanton Heck), a steamship magnate facing labor disputes within his company.

Mistaking John for a skilled mediator, Nathan invites him aboard a company cruise to negotiate with striking workers. Against the schemes of labor leader Gustavus Sonntag (Douglas Gerrard), John uses his quick wit and empathy to resolve the unrest, earning Nathan’s admiration. Meanwhile, he courts Tanya Huber (Ethel Grandin), Anton’s daughter, though Sonntag, who harbors his own feelings for Tanya, grows jealous. When Sonntag exposes John as a mere tailor, John returns to the shop, humiliated but resolute.

Convinced of John’s genuine talent, Nathan tracks him down and offers him a permanent position at the steamship company. John accepts, proving that his abilities extend beyond appearances. He and Tanya become engaged, affirming his journey from impostor to a man of substance.

== Cast ==
- Charles Ray as John Paul Bart
- Tom Ricketts as Anton Huber
- Ethel Grandin as Tanya Huber
- Victor Potel as Peter
- Stanton Heck as Abraham Nathan
- Edythe Chapman as Mrs. Nathan
- Irene as Miss Nathan
- Frederick A. Thomson as Mr. Stanlaw
- Kate Lester as Mrs. Stanlaw
- Jacqueline Logan as Corinne Stanlaw
- Frank Butler as Theodore Jellicot
- Douglas Gerrard as Gustavus Sonntag
- Nellie Peck Saunders as Kitty Dupuy
- Charlotte Pierce as Bessie Dupuy
- Thomas Jefferson as Gerald Whitcomb
- Henry A. Barrows as Hobart Sears
- Eddie Gribbon as Russell
- Michael Dark as Cecil Armstrong
- Isabel Vernon as Mrs. Fitzmorris
- Aileen Manning as Miss Shayn
- John McCallum as Butler
- William Parke Jr. as Rowlands
- Frederick Vroom as Harvey Benson
- Harold Howard as Arthur Arbuthnot
- S.J. Bingham as Cain
- Frederick Sullivan as Flynn

== Production ==
A Tailor-Made Man marked Charles Ray’s debut as a producer under his own company, Charles Ray Productions, following his departure from Paramount Pictures. Seeking greater creative control, Ray chose to adapt Harry James Smith’s successful Broadway play, which had premiered in 1917 to critical acclaim for its humorous take on social mobility. Ray collaborated with director Joe De Grasse, known for his work in silent dramas, and screenwriter Albert Ray, who tailored the script to highlight Ray’s everyman persona.

Filming took place in Los Angeles, with cinematographers George Meehan and George Rizard capturing the contrast between the working-class tailor shop and the opulent settings of high society. The production emphasized costume design, reflecting the story’s central theme of appearances shaping identity. Costumer Irene, who also appeared in a minor role, contributed to the film’s visual authenticity.

The film was one of the first releases under Ray’s distribution deal with United Artists, a company founded to give filmmakers autonomy over their work. Despite Ray’s ambitions, the production faced financial challenges, as his independent ventures struggled to match the budgets of larger studios.

== Reception ==
Contemporary reviews praised Charles Ray’s performance for its sincerity and charm, noting his ability to balance comedy and pathos. The film’s exploration of class and ambition resonated with audiences in the early 1920s, a time of rapid social change in America. However, some critics felt the plot relied too heavily on coincidence, a common critique of stage-to-screen adaptations of the era.

Modern assessments, such as those by film historian Janiss Garza, highlight the film’s significance as a showcase for Ray’s departure from his rural “country boy” roles toward more urban, aspirational characters. Its survival at Gosfilmofond of Russia has allowed for limited screenings at film archives, preserving its place in silent cinema history.

== Legacy ==
A Tailor-Made Man represents a pivotal moment in Charles Ray’s career, reflecting his attempt to transition from studio contract player to independent filmmaker. While not as commercially successful as hoped, the film contributed to the growing popularity of silent comedies that explored themes of social aspiration and self-reinvention. Its adaptation of a Broadway play also underscores the era’s trend of blending theatrical and cinematic storytelling.

The film’s preservation offers insights into early 1920s American cinema, particularly the silent era’s fascination with class dynamics and personal transformation. It remains a footnote in United Artists’ early catalog, illustrating the risks and rewards of the studio’s artist-driven model.

== See also ==
- A Tailor Made Man (play)
- Charles Ray
- United Artists
- Silent film
