= Simple Life =

Simple life or simple living refers to practices that promote simplicity in one's lifestyle.

Simple Life may also refer to:

== Film and television ==
- A Simple Life (1912 film), silent short film comedy
- The Simple Life (1919 film), silent short film comedy
- Fatty and Mabel's Simple Life, 1915 American film
- The Simple Life (1998 TV series), 1998 American sitcom
- The Simple Life, 2003–2007 American reality television series
- A Simple Life, 2011 Hong Kong film

== Literature ==
- Simple Life (1935), a novel by Nigel Balchin
- The Simple Life (1939), a German novel by Ernst Wiechert
- A Simple Life (1995), a novel by Rosie Thomas
- The Simple Life: Devotional Thoughts from Amish Country (2006), a book by Wanda E. Brunstetter

== Music ==
=== Albums ===
- Simple Life (Mac McAnally album), 1990 album by Mac McAnally
- Simple Life (Mason Jennings album), 2002 album by Mason Jennings
- The Simple Life (Magnet album), 2007 album by Magnet
- Simple Life (Megan and Liz EP), 2014 extended play by Megan and Liz

=== Songs ===
- "Simple Life" (Carolyn Dawn Johnson song), 2003 song by Carolyn Dawn Johnson
- "Simple Life" (Elton John song), 1992 song by Elton John
- "Simple Life" (John Farnham song), 1996 song by John Farnham
- "Simple Life", a song by Lynyrd Skynyrd from the 2009 album God & Guns, 2009
- "Simple Life", a song by Valdy, top 20 in 1973.
- "The Simple Life", a song from the soundtrack to 2000 The Sims video game
- "The Simple Life", song by George and Ira Gershwin from A Dangerous Maid 1921
- "The Simple Life", a song by The Juan Maclean from the 2009 album The Future Will Come, 2009
