= Patsy De Forest =

American actress

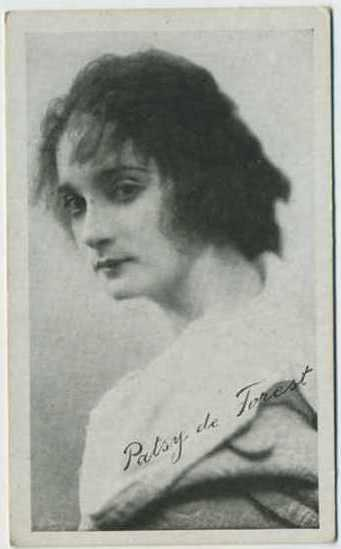
- Born: Helen May Lanagan; May 1, 1894; Louisville, Kentucky
- Died: August 1, 1966 (aged 72); New York City
- Other names: Patsy De Forrest; Patsy DeForest

Patsy De Forest (born Helen May Lanagan; May 1, 1894 – August 1, 1966) was an American actress of the silent cinema era who performed on the stage since childhood before acting in films.

== Career ==
De Forest acted in over eighty films from 1912 to 1920, with over thirty appearances each in 1915 and in 1916. She worked with several production companies including Lubin Manufacturing Company, Vitagraph Studios and Fox Film Corporation. She acted in several comedies directed by Lawrence Semon of Vitagraph in the mid-1910s. She also acted in some Broadway musicals.

De Forest's last film appearance was in Sunset Sprague, a 1920 Western in which she was the female lead. She died in August 1966 at the age of 72.

== Filmography ==
- Wifey's Ma Comes Back, directed by Arthur Hotaling (1912)
- Patsy at School, directed by Percy Winter (1914)
- Patsy's First Love (1915)
- Feel My Muscle
- Patsy at College
- Patsy's Vacation
- Patsy in Business
- Patsy on a Trolley Car
- Patsy in a Seminary
- His Soul Mate, directed by Joseph Kaufman (1915)
- Patsy at the Seashore
- Patsy's Elopement
- The Human Investment, directed by George Terwilliger (1915)
- Patsy Among the Fairies
- Patsy in Town
- Patsy Among the Smugglers
- Patsy on a Yacht
- Patsy, Married and Settled
- Out for a Stroll
- The New Butler, directed by Arthur Hotaling (1915)
- A Day on the Force
- The New Valet
- Wifey's Ma Comes Back
- When Wifey Sleeps
- Billie's Heiress
- Billie's Debut
- Queenie of the Nile
- Think of the Money
- Playing Horse
- The Cellar Spy
- His Three Brides
- Blaming the Duck, or Ducking the Blame
- And the Parrot Said...?
- The Great Detective, directed by Edwin McKim (1915)
- This Isn't the Life
- His Lordship, directed by Edwin McKim (1916)
- Fooling Uncle
- The New Janitor
- The Butler
- The Fatal Bean
- Otto the Bllboy
- Frocks and Frills
- Skirts and Cinders
- Otto the Artist
- Otto the Hero
- Trilby Frilled
- Otto the Reporter
- Otto the Cobbler
- Otto's Legacy
- No Place Like Jail
- Otto the Traffic Cop
- Otto's Vacation
- Otto the Sleuth
- Otto, the Salesman
- Otto, the Gardener
- Romance and Roughhouse, directed by Lawrence Semon (1916)
- There and Back
- A Villainous Villain
- Love and Loot
- Sand, Scamps and Strategy
- She Who Last Laughs
- Walls and Wallops
- Jumps and Jealousy
- His Conscious Conscience
- Hash and Havoc
- Help! Help! Help!
- Rah! Rah! Rah!
- Shanks and Chivalry
- Speed and Spunk
- Bullies and Bullets
- Cops and Cussedness
- The Gift of the Magi, directed by Brinsley Shaw (1917)
- Her Secret, directed by Perry N. Vekroff (1917)
- An Alabaster Box, directed by Chester Withey (1917)
- The Guilty Party, directed by Thomas R. Mills (1917)
- The Love Doctor, directed by Paul Scardon (1917)
- A Night in New Arabia, directed by Thomas R. Mills (1917)
- The Last Leaf, directed by Ashley Miller (1917)
- A Madison Square Arabian Night
- Lost on Dress Parade
- Bullin' the Bullsheviki
- My Girl Suzanne
- Square Shooter
- Sunset Sprague, directed by Paul Cazeneuve and Thomas N. Heffron (1920)

== Theatrical Appearances ==
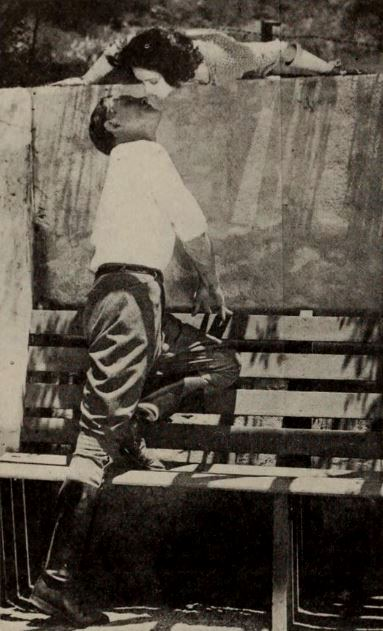
Buck Jones and Patsy De Forest between scenes, p. 66 of the Exhibitors Herald (09/18/1920)

- All Aboard (Broadway, June 5, 1913)
- The Red Canary (Broadway, April 13, 1914)
- The Peasant Girl (Broadway, March 2, 1915)
- Come Along (Broadway, April 8, 1919)
- Oh, What A Girl! (Broadway, July 28, 1919)
