= William Shea =

American lawyer and sports team owner (1907–1991)

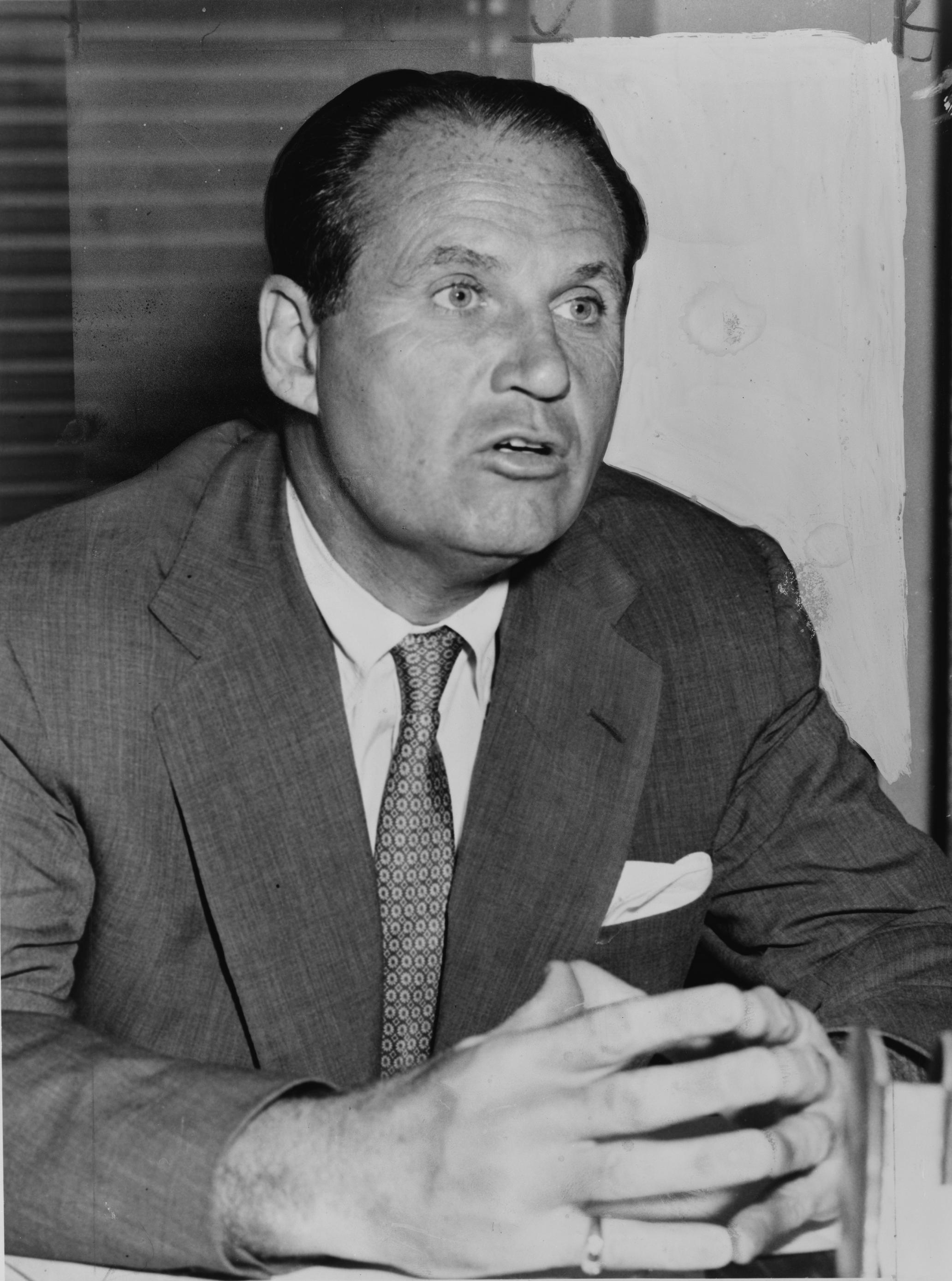
- Shea in 1959
- Born: William Alfred Shea; June 21, 1907; New York City, U.S.
- Died: October 2, 1991 (aged 84); New York City, U.S.
- Education: Georgetown University (AB, LLB)
- Occupations: Lawyer; sports team owner

William Alfred Shea (/ʃeɪ/ SHAY; June 21, 1907 – October 2, 1991) was an American lawyer, philanthropist, civic leader and sports team owner. He co-founded the law firm of Shea & Gould in 1964 and established the Continental League with Branch Rickey, which was instrumental in breaking down the Major League Baseball expansion barrier leading to approximately half of the existing MLB teams being accepted into Major League Baseball, including the New York Mets whose home stadium, Shea Stadium, was named in his honor from 1964–2008. Shea was a minority owner of the Washington Redskins prior to selling his interests to Jack Kent Cooke and served on the boards of the NFL's Washington Redskins, MLB's New York Yankees, and the NHL's New York Islanders, among many others. Shea was an ardent supporter of many civic, children's and Catholic charities, including, the American Ireland Fund, the National Center for Disability Services, the Foundation for Children with Learning Disabilities, Catholic Charities, and Little League Baseball. Shea was offered shares of the New York Mets in exchange for the services rendered on behalf of the City of New York regarding the team; however, Shea turned down the offer, stating he would not accept monetary gain in exchange for something he considered a civic action.

== Early life and career ==
Born in the Washington Heights section of Manhattan, Shea attended George Washington High School. He began undergraduate work at New York University, where he was admitted to the Zeta Psi fraternity, and later graduated from Georgetown University with a Bachelor of Arts in 1930 and the Georgetown Law School, receiving his Bachelor of Laws degree in 1931. He was a member of the Georgetown Hoyas men's basketball team for three years and played one year for the Georgetown Hoyas football team. Shea's sister was actress Gloria Shea. It was Gloria who paid for Bill's time at Georgetown University.

Shea worked for two state insurance bureaucracies before entering private practice in 1940. During this time, he worked with owners of the Brooklyn Dodgers and San Francisco Giants. In 1964, he formed Shea & Gould with iconic litigator Milton Gould. Members of the firm were colloquially referred to as the unofficial permanent government of the State of New York. As one account put it: "Shea was neither a litigator nor a legal scholar. Rather, he was the sort of lawyer whom powerful men trusted with their secrets and whom they could rely upon as a go-between. ... [H]e earned a reputation as a man who could get things done."

== Major League Baseball ==
William Shea was honored alongside the retired numbers of the New York Mets in 2008.

In 1958, one year after the Brooklyn Dodgers and New York Giants left for Los Angeles and San Francisco, respectively (which left the city with one major league baseball team, the American League Yankees), Mayor Robert Wagner of the City of New York asked Shea to chair a committee to return the National League to New York. He first tried to bring an existing franchise to New York, but the Cincinnati Reds, Philadelphia Phillies, and Pittsburgh Pirates all refused his overtures. When requests for expansion were declined, Shea proposed a new league, the Continental League, and travelled to a farm outside Philadelphia to talk Branch Rickey out of retirement to help him. The formation of the Continental League was announced by Rickey in 1959. The Continental League would have been a third major league and would have begun play in 1961.

The threat of a third major league forced Major League Baseball to discuss expansion. Two teams would be added to the American League in 1961: the second incarnation of the Washington Senators — now the Texas Rangers — and the Los Angeles Angels (now in Anaheim), and two more to the National League in 1962 (the New York Mets and the Houston Colt .45s (now the Houston Astros). With New York virtually assured of one of the new teams, Shea abandoned the idea of the Continental League. The New York Mets played their first game on April 11, 1962.

In 1964, the City of New York named the new stadium in which the Mets were to play in Shea's honor — Shea Stadium. In 2008, the New York Mets retired the name "Shea" on the outfield wall of Shea Stadium alongside the other elite players and managers whom the Mets have deemed worthy of such an honor over the years (Tom Seaver, Mike Piazza, Gil Hodges, Casey Stengel, and Jackie Robinson, retired by all teams at the request of Major League Baseball). The honor was carried over to Citi Field, the new home of the Mets, with the other players' and managers' numbers.

As of 2017, there are approximately 39 individuals who have been admitted to the Executives & Pioneers Division of the Hall of Fame. Of the 15 honored individuals admitted to the Executives & Pioneers Division of the Major League Baseball Hall of Fame post-World War II, Shea served as a friend, an advisor, a peer, and as counsel to no fewer than two-thirds thereof (Happy Chandler; Ford Frick; Warren Giles; Clark Griffith; William Harridge; Bowie Kuhn; Leland MacPhail Sr.; Leland MacPhail Jr.; Walter O'Malley; Alejandro Pompez; Branch Rickey; Bill Veeck; George Weiss; J. Leslie "J.L." Wilkinson; Tom Yawkey).

== National Football League ==
Shea, a one-time owner of the Boston Yanks and the Washington Redskins of the National Football League (NFL), was on the board of directors of the NFL's Washington Redskins from April 1961 until his death. He further persuaded Harry Wismer to sell the New York Titans (now the Jets), and Sonny Werblin to buy them, and was integral to the creation and administration of the initial annual championship games between the AFL and the NFL, now known as the Super Bowl (thanks to Lamar Hunt). His law firm, Shea & Gould, also represented the NFL.

== National Hockey League ==
Shea was also hired by Nassau County to persuade the National Hockey League (NHL) to grant a team to the then new Nassau Veterans Memorial Coliseum, resulting in the New York Islanders, who began play in 1972.

== National Basketball Association ==
Shea was integral to bringing the New Jersey Americans of the American Basketball Association to Long Island in 1968 and arranging for them to play as the Nets in the Nassau County (they are now based in Brooklyn), as well as the absorption of four American Basketball Association teams into the National Basketball Association in 1976.

== Death ==
Shea died at age 84 on October 2, 1991, from complications of a stroke he had suffered two years earlier. In 1992, the Mets wore a memorial patch on the left sleeve to honor Shea's memory.

== Homages ==
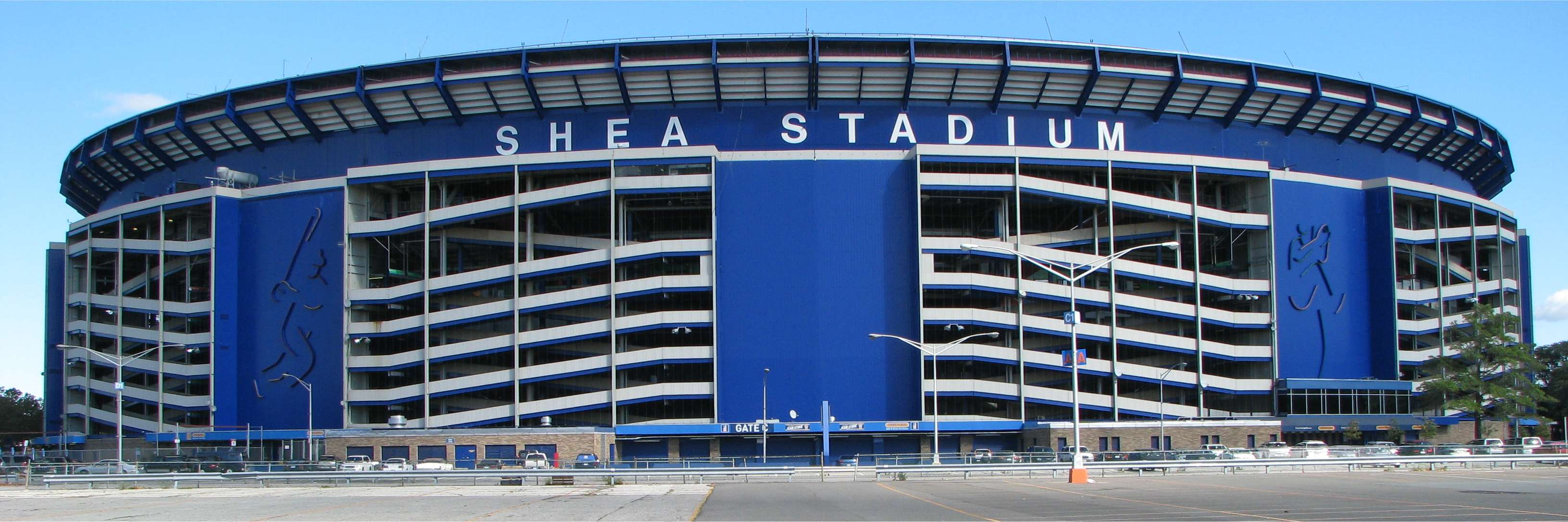
Shea Stadium was the Mets' home from 1964 to 2008.

- On April 8, 2008, the New York Mets retired the name "Shea" alongside other retired numbers in honor of William Shea and the closing of Shea Stadium.
- On November 21, 2009, the Mets announced that the pedestrian bridge located in the outfield section of Citi Field, Shea Stadium's successor, would be named "Shea Bridge" in honor of William Shea.
- To honor Shea's many contributions, commencing in 1987 and continuing today, on an annual basis during the Little League World Series in Williamsport, Pennsylvania, the William A. "Bill" Shea – Distinguished Little League Graduate Award is presented to a former little leaguer in Major League Baseball who best exemplifies the spirit of Little League Baseball. Consideration for selection includes both the individual's ability and accomplishments and the individual's status as a positive role model.
- The Bill Shea Harlem Little League Friendship Field located in Marcus Garvey Park in Harlem, New York, is a flagship Little League baseball field and the home of Harlem Little League. Shea had initiated efforts to convert a dilapidated lot that was shared with municipal leagues into a new grass field upon which Little League in Harlem could play. Through the dedication of others, the field was built, although not until 1998, seven years after Shea's death. Today, Little League is the largest organized youth sports program in the world.
- In Spring 2014, Shea was inducted into the Irish American Baseball Hall of Fame.
- Atlanta Braves third baseman Chipper Jones named his second son Shea after Jones' success in Shea Stadium against the Mets; he hit 19 home runs there, more than any other road park.
- Former Cincinnati Reds shortstop Barry Larkin named his eldest daughter Brielle D'Shea, as he enjoyed playing at Shea Stadium.
- David Wright named his first child born, July 23, 2016, Olivia Shea Wright after the stadium and thus after Shea himself.
