= Should a Woman Divorce? =

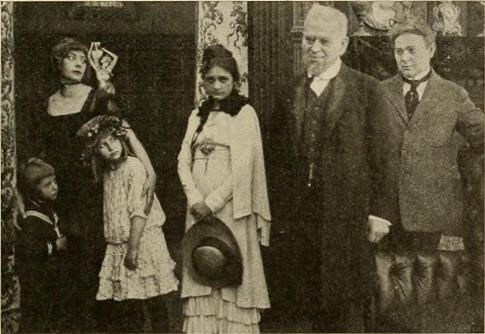
- Scene from Should a Woman Divorce?
- Directed by: Edwin McKim
- Written by: Ivan Abramson
- Produced by: Ivan Film Productions
- Starring: Lea Leland and Leonid Samoloff
- Release date: 1914
- Country: United States
- Languages: Silent film English intertitles

Should a Woman Divorce? is a 1914 silent film written by Ivan Abramson and directed by Edwin McKim, and starring Lea Leland and Leonid Samoloff.

== Plot ==
Grace Roberts (played by Lea Leland), marries rancher Edward Smith, who is revealed to be a neglectful, vice-ridden spouse. They have a daughter, Vivian. Dr. Franklin (Leonid Samoloff) whisks Grace away from this unhappy life, and they move to New York under aliases, pretending to be married (since surely Smith would not agree to a divorce). Grace and Franklin have a son, Walter (Milton S. Gould). Vivian gets sick, however, and Grace and Franklin return to save her. Somehow this reunion, as Smith had assumed Grace to be dead, causes the death of Franklin. This plot device frees Grace to return to her father's farm with both children.

== Cast ==
- Leonid Samoloff as Dr. Franklin
- Lea Leland as Grace Roberts
- Anna Lehr
- Mabel Wright
- Ordean Stark as Vivian
- Robert Taber
- Frederic Roberts
- Milton S. Gould as Walter (child actor, grandson of Abramson, later became a prominent attorney)

== Background and reception ==
The film was not favorably reviewed by critics, as Robert B. Connelly's 1998 volume on silent films succinctly describes it as a "stinker." Variety noted that "it needed five parts (reels) to unwind this Immoral and Impossible story, and still it didn't answer "Should a Woman Divorce?" Hanford C. Judson of Moving Picture World described the film as "crammed full of humanity, but has no social propaganda at all. It is simply a story that Ivan Abramson has made up, using what license he needed, such as total disregard of American divorce laws, to make his picture entertaining." Judson also noted the picture's "distinct Semitic atmosphere" despite its supposed farming area setting, which is an astute observation as Jewish writer/producer Ivan Abramson had emigrated from Russia and this was one of his first films. Actor Leonid Samoloff was an accomplished tenor who had also emigrated from Russia.

The film was directed by Edwin McKim, husband of actress Anna Lehr, who are perhaps best known as the parents of actress Ann Dvorak. Some sources list "Edward McKim" as the director of the film, but that appears to be an error.

Abramson's grandson Milton S. Gould was cast in the role of Grace's son Walter.
