= Shea & Gould =

Defunct American law firm in New York City

- Headquarters: New York City
- Major practice areas: "General Practice"
- Date founded: 1964
- Founder: Milton S. Gould, William Shea
- Company type: Limited liability partnership
- Dissolved: 1994

Shea & Gould was one of New York's best-known law firms owned and operated by Milton S. Gould and William Shea. It was established as a result of a merger in 1964 between the firm Manning, Hollinger & Shea and Gallup, and the firm Climenko & Gould. Then in the 1970s the firm acquired several smaller niche practices in antitrust and other areas. It dissolved in 1994.

== Offices ==
The firm once employed about 200 lawyers with offices in Washington, Albany, New York, Los Angeles, California, and London. The Los Angeles office was opened with the 1985 acquisition of 70-lawyer firm, Pacht Ross Warne Bernhardt & Sears, but it closed in 1989 due to weak earnings. A number of Shea & Gould's Los Angeles lawyers left in 1989 to open the office of the now-defunct New York City law firm Myerson & Kuhn. An additional seven lawyers spun off from Shea & Gould in 1989 to found New York law firm Ingram Yuzek.

== Clients ==
Among the clients Shea & Gould represented were the New York Mets, the New York Yankees, Deloitte and the Marine Midland Bank. Some of its personal clients were Aristotle Onassis, New York's Mayor Abraham Beame and Reverend Sun Myung Moon. The firm was well known for its New York government relations practice, especially with the city's Democratic administrations in New York City and Albany.

== Attorneys ==
The firm's attorneys included the former Governor of New York, Hugh Carey, who joined as of counsel, Wilbur D. Mills, a former U.S. Representative from Arkansas, former professional basketball player and Rhodes Scholar Heyward Dotson, and Jerome H. Kern, a founder of the law firm Wachtell, Lipton, Rosen & Katz.

== Dissolution ==
In 1991, Shea died and the firm elected a new chairman of the firm, Thomas E. Constance, and soon after added new members to the firm's executive committee. But the larger committee created tensions until they voted on January 27, 1994, to dissolve the firm by March 31 due to irreconcilable differences.

== Name partners ==
- Milton S. Gould
- William Shea
