= Civilization's Child =

1916 film by Charles Giblyn

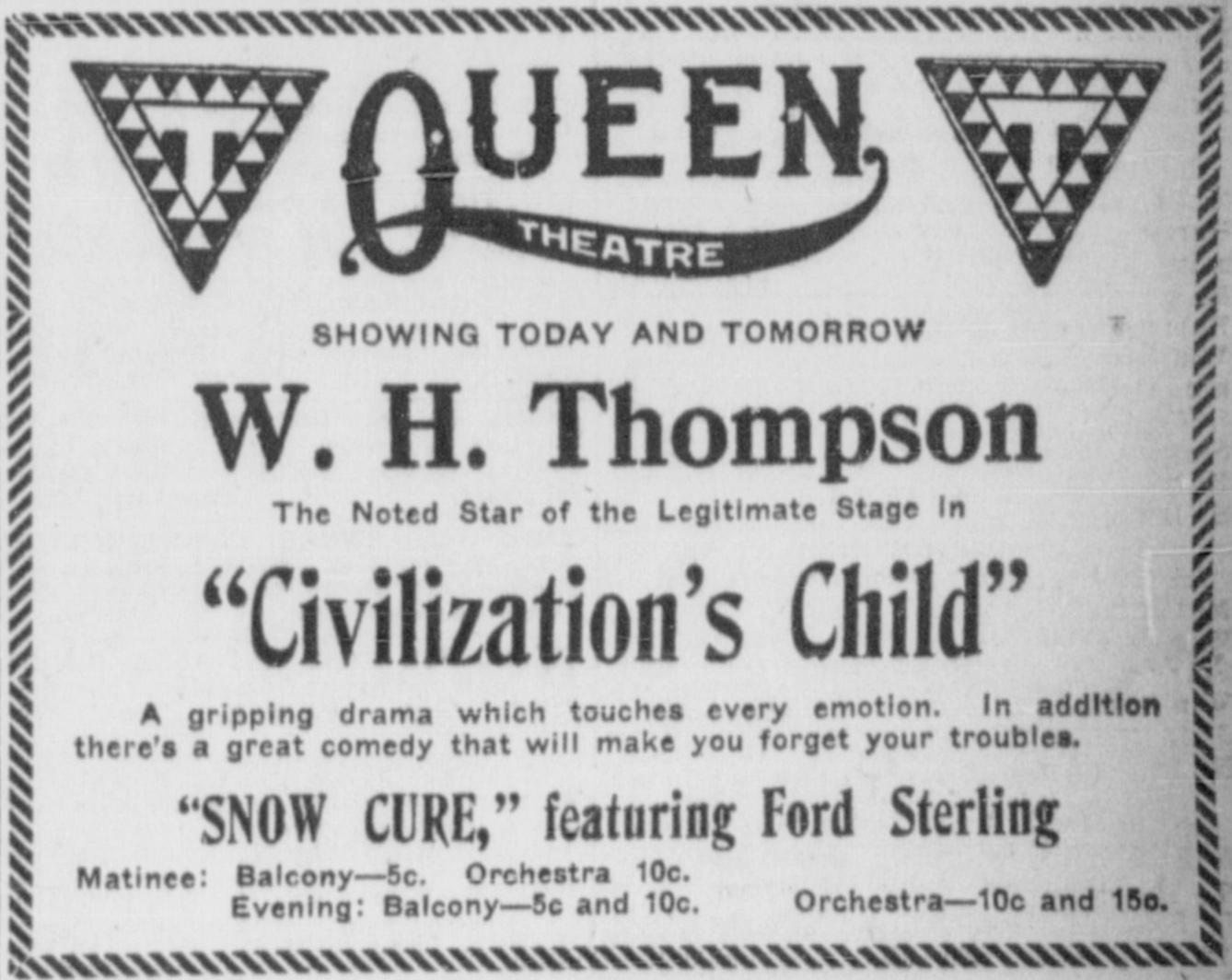
- Contemporary advertisement
- Directed by: Charles Giblyn
- Written by: C. Gardner Sullivan (titles)
- Produced by: Thomas H. Ince
- Starring: William H. Thompson; Anna Lehr; Jack Standing
- Cinematography: Charles E. Kaufman
- Release date: 1916
- Country: United States
- Language: Silent with English intertitles

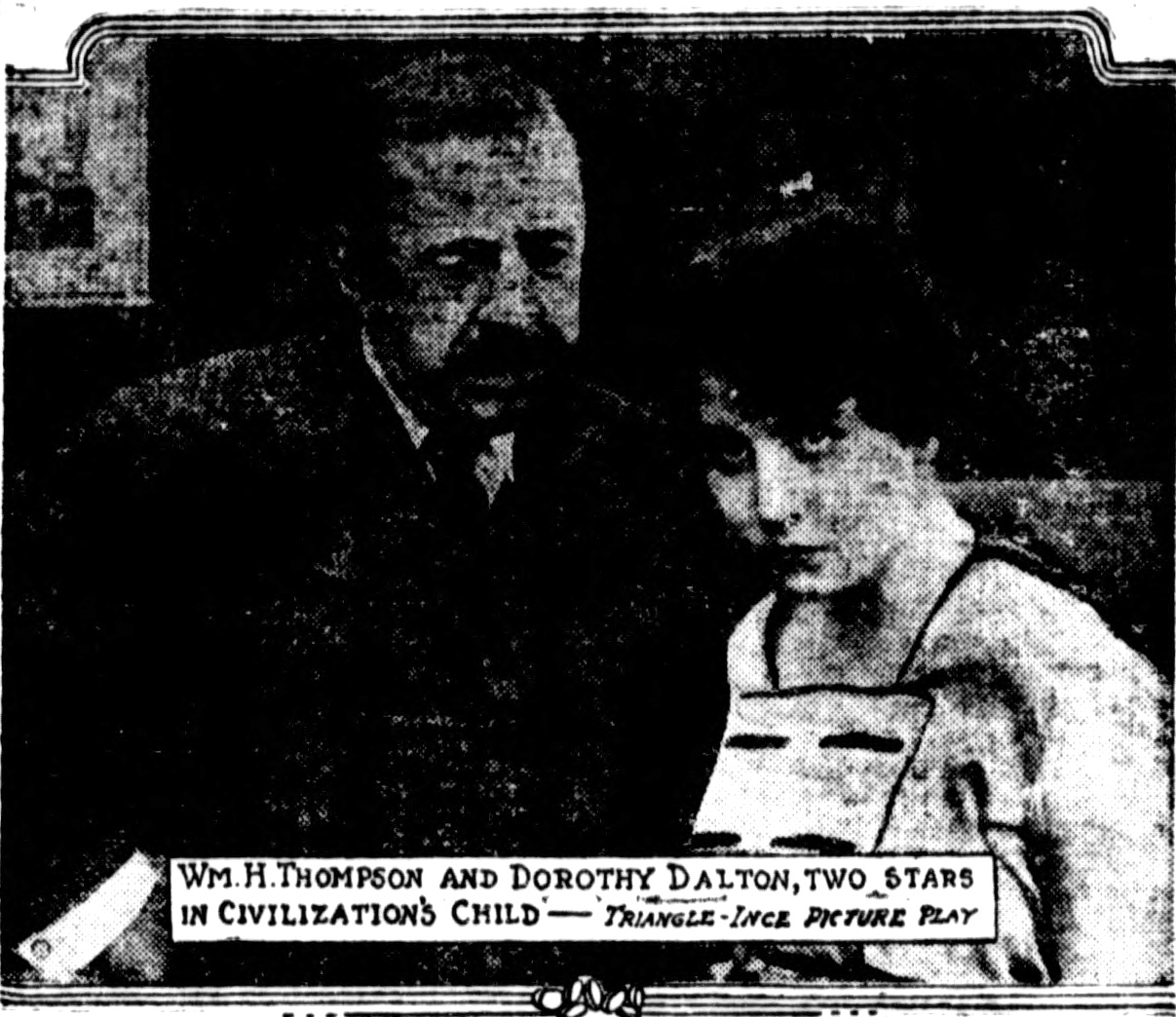
Scene from the film

== Cast ==
- William H. Thompson: Boss Jim McManus
- Anna Lehr: Berna
- Jack Standing: Nicolay Turgenev
- Dorothy Dalton: Ellen McManus
- Clyde Benson: Jacob Weil
- J.P. Lockney: Peter Saranoff
- J. Barney Sherry: Judge Sims

== The film ==
Civilization's Child is a silent film from 1916 directed by Charles Giblyn under the supervision of Thomas H. Ince. Like other films produced by Kay-Bee Pictures the film was praised at the time for its artistic title cards, created by Irvin Willat. A reviewer in Moving Picture World mentioned one title card where "the efforts of a ward politician to get an unprotected girl into his clutches was symbolized by a realistic picture of a spider endeavoring to entice an unsuspecting little fly into the meshes of his web". No copies of the film are known to survive.

== Plot ==
After an idyllic childhood in the mountains of Russia, Berna accompanies her uncle to Kiev, to the Jewish part of the city. Many Jewish residents of Kiev are killed by the Cossacks and Berna flees, taking ship for the United States. In New York, she is exploited by a local boss, Jim McManus, who seduces her and puts her out onto the street as a prostitute.

Some time later, Berna marries Nicolai Turgenev, a young musician, and has a baby by him. But Ellen, McManus's daughter, falls in love with Nicolai and succeeds in drawing him away from his family. Meanwhile, McManus has become a judge; he ratifies their separation and grants Nikolai a divorce so that he can marry McManus's daughter and adopt Nikolai's and Berna's child.

Driven mad by desperation, Berna goes to the judge, accuses him of being the cause of her ruin, and kills him.

== Production ==
The film was produced by Kay-Bee Pictures and by the New York Motion Picture Co.

== Distribution ==
The film was distributed by Triangle Distributing, and opened in cinemas on April 23, 1916.

== See also ==
- List of American films of 1916
- List of lost films
