= Myerson & Kuhn =

New York–based law firm, 1988 to 1990

- Founded: 1988
- Founder: Bowie Kuhn and Harvey D. Myerson
- Defunct: 1990
- Headquarters: New York City

Myerson & Kuhn was a New York-based law firm that operated from 1988 to 1990. It was formed by name partners Bowie Kuhn and Harvey D. Myerson, former partner in the defunct Finley, Kumble, Wagner, Underberg, Manley, Myerson & Casey, who brought some 80 attorneys with him from the unraveling firm. The new firm benefited from the arrival of former Finley, Kumble partners who brought such clients as Donald Trump, Lehman Brothers, Teleflex, Inc. and ConAgra.

In 1989, the firm launched in Los Angeles with a group of 18 lawyers who defected from Shea & Gould. The firm suffered a spectacular collapse in December 1989 amid discord with its biggest client, Shearson Lehman Hutton, predecessor to Lehman Brothers, over the alleged padding of legal bills, and mounting debts of over $11 million.

Named partner Bowie Kuhn fled to Florida as creditors sought to hold him personally liable for up to $3 million in firm debts. When the press and his creditors finally found him in Northern Florida, Kuhn told the New York Times, "My multiple great-grandfather Dr. William Worthington was the first Governor of this section of Florida after it was acquired from Spain in 1819."

Harvey Myerson, first given the moniker "Heavy Hitter Harvey" for his litigation acumen, was later given the nickname "Agent Orange of the legal profession″ in the legal press due to his extravagant tastes and unfulfilled ambitions which drove his firm into the ground financially. For example, guests at the launch party for the firm each received a Cartier SA crystal apple with gold leaves and stem engraved with a quote from the Wall Street Journal remarking on the formation of the firm, 'A New Legal Powerhouse is Rising.' Though Myerson dreamed of relaunching a legal practice, he was sentenced to 70 months in federal prison for tax fraud and defrauding clients.
