= The Butler (1916 film) =

1916 film by Edwin McKim

The Butler is a 1916 American short film. It is directed by Edwin McKim to his own scenario.

The film stars Davy Don as Otto the Butler, Florence Williams as Mrs. Van Webber, Patsy De Forest as Gwendoline, George Egan as The Waiter, and Charles Leonard as another Butler.

== Title dispute ==
In 2013, the film was the subject of a dispute between Warner Bros., which now owns the film in its library, and Harvey Weinstein, who sought to use the same film title for the 2013 film by Lee Daniels. The Motion Picture Association of America ordered the Weinstein Co. to pay $400,000 to the Entertainment Industry Foundation and $150,000 to Warner Bros. for violating its initial order to not use the title The Butler, and stipulated that the title could only be used if the letters in "Lee Daniels" were at least 75 percent the size of the title "The Butler".
