= Men (1918 film) =

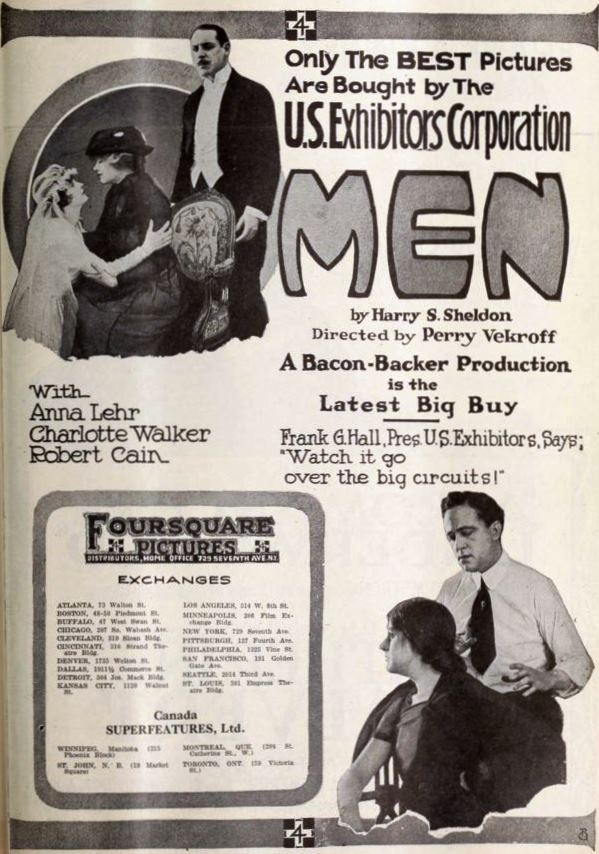
- Advertisement for film
- Directed by: Perry N. Vekroff
- Written by: Perry N. Vekroff (scenario)
- Screenplay by: Harry Sophus Sheldon
- Based on: Men by Harry Sophus Sheldon
- Produced by: Gerard F. Bacon
- Starring: Anna Lehr; Charlotte Walker; Robert Cain
- Cinematography: Alfred Moses
- Production company: Bacon-Backer Film Corp.
- Distributed by: Foursquare Pictures
- Release date: May 15, 1918 (United States)
- Running time: 6 reels
- Country: United States
- Language: Silent (English intertitles)

Men was a 1918 American silent drama film directed by Perry N. Vekroff based upon a play by Harry Sophus Sheldon. It starred Anna Lehr, Charlotte Walker, and Robert Cain. It is considered to be a lost film.

== Plot ==
As described in the Exhibitors Herald, a film magazine of the time, the plot was the following. Laura Burton (Lehr) refuses the love of an honest artist to accept the flattering attentions of Roger Hamilton (Cain), a society pet. In due time, however, she finds that she has been betrayed and returns to her mother (Walker). She reads of Hamilton's engagement to Alice Fairbanks (McCoy) who, in reality, is her sister adopted by the Fairbanks in childhood. Laura and her mother arrive in time to prevent the completion of the ceremony. Hamilton is denounced, Alice is free to marry the man she loves, and the young artist returns to claim Laura.

== Cast ==
- Anna Lehr as Laura Burton
- Charlotte Walker as Mrs. Burton
- Robert Cain as Roger Hamilton
- Gertrude McCoy as Alice Fairbanks
- Willette Kershaw as Mrs. Fairbanks
- Ida Darling as Mrs. Hamilton
- William H. Tooker as George Fairbanks (credited as William Tooker)
- Huntley Gordon as Tom Courtney
- Bradley Barker as Anthony Gerard
- Fred Radcliffe as Doctor Forbes
- Eugene Acker

== Reception ==
Like many American films of the time, Men was subject to restrictions and cuts by city and state film censorship boards. For example, the Chicago Board of Censors issued an Adults Only permit and cut, in Reel 6, the bridegroom shooting man. The board later rescinded the Adults Only permit after an agreement to make these additional changes, which modified the plot of the film: Reel 3, insert new intertitle "We will steal quietly away and be married", replace intertitle "Soon when we are married" with "It will be necessary to keep our marriage secret until the objections of my family are overcome", Reel 4, replace intertitle "I can deceive my mother no longer — when are we to be married?" to "I can deceive my mother no longer, when is our marriage to be announced?", replace intertitle "My family still objects, I can never marry you" to "Our marriage is not legal", Reel 5, during conversation between mother and daughter insert new intertitle "My husband has deceived me with a mock marriage" or words to that effect, and cut scene of bridegroom shooting man.
