= Jack Kent Cooke =

Canadian American sports team owner (1912–1997)

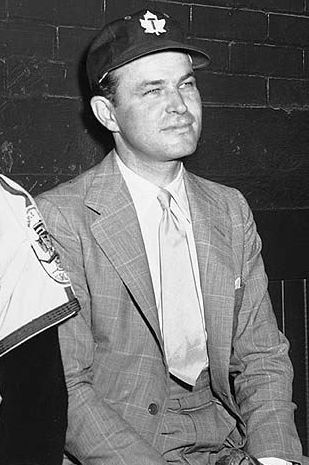
- Cooke in 1955
- Born: October 25, 1912; Hamilton, Ontario, Canada
- Died: April 6, 1997 (aged 84); Washington, D.C., U.S.
- Occupation: Businessman
- Children: 3
- Awards: NBA champion (1972); 3× Super Bowl champion (XVII, XXII, XXVI)
- Baseball career

Member of the Canadian

Baseball Hall of Fame
- Induction: 1985

Jack Kent Cooke (October 25, 1912 – April 6, 1997) was a Canadian-American businessman in broadcasting and professional sports. Starting in sales, Cooke was very successful, eventually becoming a partner in a network of radio stations and newspapers in Canada. After failing at starting a major league baseball team in Toronto and being turned down to own a television station in Toronto, Cooke moved to the United States and built a business empire in broadcasting and professional sports franchises.

Cooke was the owner of the Washington Redskins (NFL), the Los Angeles Lakers (NBA), the Los Angeles Kings (NHL), the Los Angeles Wolves (United Soccer), and the Toronto Maple Leafs (IL). He also developed The Forum in Inglewood, California, and Jack Kent Cooke Stadium (Northwest Stadium), in Landover, Maryland. Under his ownership, the Lakers won the 1972 NBA Finals while the Redskins won Super Bowls in 1982, 1987, and 1991.

== Biography ==
=== Early life ===
Born in Hamilton, Ontario, Cooke moved with his family to The Beaches area of Toronto in 1921, where he attended Malvern Collegiate Institute.

At age 14, Cooke got a job selling encyclopedias. At the end of his first day, he took home over $20 to his mother, and later claimed, "I think that was the proudest moment of my life." He later became a runner on the floor of the Toronto Stock Exchange. He was selling soap in Northern Ontario for Colgate-Palmolive in 1936 when he met Roy Thomson, who hired Cooke to run radio station CJCS in Stratford, Ontario. The two became partners in 1941, buying radio stations and newspapers in Ontario and Quebec.

==== Early foray in media and sports ownership ====
With the financial backing of J. P. Bickell, Cooke purchased CKCL (under Toronto Broadcasting Co.) in 1945, changing the call letters to CKEY. He also continued to work with Thomson, and the two acquired the Canadian edition of Liberty magazine in 1948, naming it New Liberty. The following year, Thomson sold his half of the magazine to Cooke.

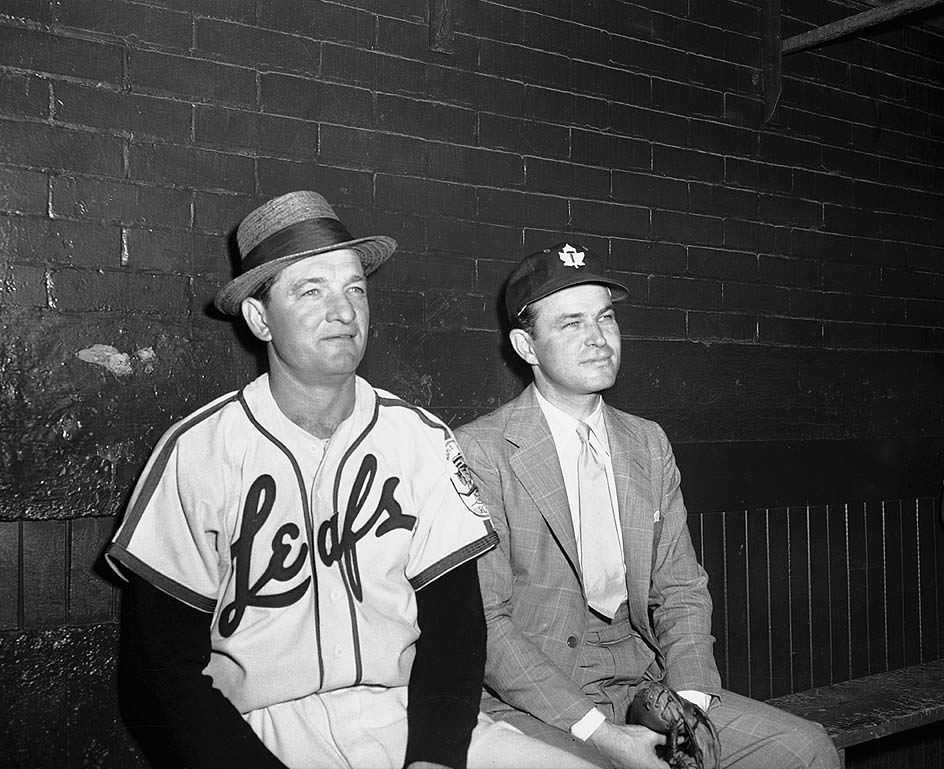
Cooke (right) swaps hats with Joe Becker, who managed the Maple Leafs in 1951–52

In 1951, Cooke ventured into sports, acquiring the minor league Toronto Maple Leafs baseball club. Upon purchasing the team, Cooke informed the media that the Maple Leafs would be integrated immediately, signing second baseman Charlie White and pitcher-outfielder Leon Day within two weeks of the acquisition. Day, a future Hall of Famer, pitched in 14 games that season and then moved on to other teams. White and Day paved the way for future black Maple Leafs like Sam Jethroe, Elston Howard, Earl Battey, Dave Pope, Humberto Robinson, Connie Johnson, Lou Johnson, Mack Jones, Marshall Bridges, and Reggie Smith – not to mention later generations of black players who starred with Toronto's eventual Major League Baseball franchise, the Blue Jays.

Cooke transformed the games from straight athletic contests into complete entertainment packages, with a long list of special promotions and celebrity appearances. With his focus on entertainment, Cooke was compared to St. Louis Browns owner Bill Veeck. Five months after becoming owner, Cooke presented a 48-page booklet to all the teams in the league, outlining his promotional strategies. He was named minor league executive of the year by The Sporting News in 1952. That same year, Cooke purchased Consolidated Press, publisher of Saturday Night magazine. He made an unsuccessful bid for The Globe and Mail newspaper in 1955.

While owning the Maple Leafs baseball team, Cooke set his sights on bringing a major league club to Toronto. He tried to purchase the St. Louis Browns, Philadelphia Athletics and Detroit Tigers when they came up for sale, and in 1959 he became one of the founding team owners in the Continental League, a proposed third major league for professional baseball. The league disbanded a year later without ever playing a game. Cooke still hoped to get an American League expansion team in Toronto, but the city's lack of a major league venue became an impasse.

On the field, Cooke's Maple Leafs were an International League powerhouse, finishing in first place during the regular season four times, capturing the 1960 Governors' Cup as playoff champions, and leading the circuit in attendance every year between 1952 and 1956. Between 1953 and 1959, Cooke operated the Leafs without a major-league affiliation, buying or trading for the contracts of most of the players on his roster from MLB clubs. Veteran minor-league slugger Rocky Nelson, who won the IL's "Triple Crown" in 1958, rode his two-year Toronto stay to one final big-league opportunity with the Pittsburgh Pirates in 1959, where he became one of the stars of their 1960 world champions. Organizations also loaned players like Howard and Battey to Cooke's Maple Leafs to advance their development.

Cooke sold the Maple Leafs in 1964. Before that, he had watched several team practices and observed Sparky Anderson, noting the player's leadership qualities and ability to teach younger players from all backgrounds. Cooke encouraged Anderson to pursue a career in managing, offering him the post for the Leafs. In 1964, Anderson accepted the offer. Cooke was inducted into the Canadian Baseball Hall of Fame in 1985.

In 1960, Cooke lost a bid to obtain a licence for the first privately owned TV station in Toronto. There had been nine bids in a highly competitive process, and the licence was awarded to a consortium of Aldred-Rogers Broadcasting and the Telegram Corporation, which launched CFTO-TV.

=== Move to the United States ===
Within weeks of being turned down for the Toronto TV license, Cooke applied for U.S. citizenship. With the support of U.S. Representative Francis E. Walter (D-Pa.), Cooke quickly became a citizen when both houses of Congress and President Dwight D. Eisenhower approved a waiver of the usual five-year waiting period.

Originally established about 1899, incorporated in 1929, as Consolidated Press Limited, the company changed hands on October 23, 1952, when Consolidated Press Limited', publishers of Saturday Night and Canadian Home Journal magazines, was bought by Jack Kent Cooke, and in 1958, changed its name to Consolidated Frybrook Industries Limited, and, launched in spring 1959, in New York City, a subsidiary, Strand Records, an American budget label. Cooke sold CKEY at the end of 1960 and Consolidated Press in 1961.

At the time, Canada and the U.S. both had laws prohibiting foreign control of radio and TV stations. Cooke had entered the U.S. broadcasting industry in August 1959 by acquiring Pasadena, California radio station KRLA 1110 (now KWVE) through his brother, Donald Cooke, a U.S. citizen.

Cooke formed American Cablevision in the 1960s and acquired several cable television companies. He acquired majority ownership of TelePrompTer cable TV, and sold it in the late 1970s for $646 million. In 1979, he acquired the Chrysler Building in New York City, one of the world's most renowned skyscrapers. In 1985, Cooke bought the Los Angeles Daily News for $176 million. A year later, he acquired another cable TV company. He sold the cable systems in 1989.

=== Sports ownership ===
==== Washington Redskins ====
I was never into Cooke-watching as much as I was into watching his teams, and the people he hired to run them. You didn't have to be close to Cooke to make this case: He was the best owner in the history of sports. Not pro football, all of sports.

— Michael Wilbon

In 1960, Cooke purchased 25% interest in the Washington Redskins of the National Football League (NFL) for $300,000. He purchased majority interest in the team from team president Edward Bennett Williams in 1974, replaced him as controlling owner in 1979, and became sole owner in 1985. As owner of the Redskins, the team won three Super Bowls under head coach Joe Gibbs (in 1982, 1987, and 1991), the franchise's first championships since the 1940s. Cooke oversaw the construction of Jack Kent Cooke Stadium, now known as Northwest Stadium, which opened in Landover, Maryland, following his death in 1997. In his will, he left the team and stadium to his foundation with instructions to sell. Cooke's son and team president John Kent Cooke managed the team before selling it to Daniel Snyder in 1999 for $800 million.

==== Los Angeles Lakers ====
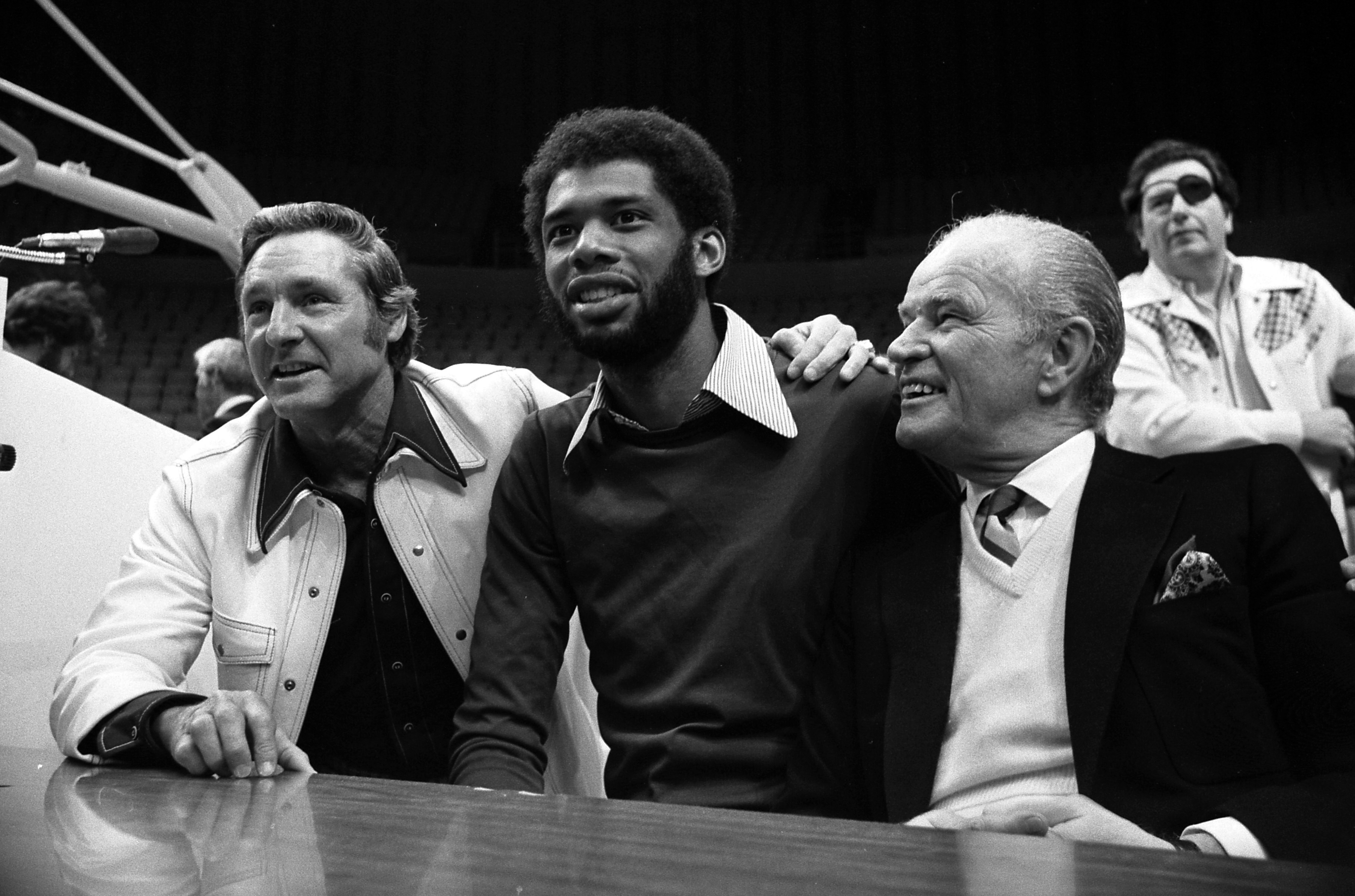
Cooke (right) in 1975 at the introductory press conference for the signing of Kareem Abdul-Jabbar.

In September 1965, Cooke purchased the Los Angeles Lakers from Bob Short for $5 million. Under Cooke's ownership the Lakers moved from the Los Angeles Memorial Sports Arena to The Forum and changed their colors from Royal and Light Blue to the current Purple (which he referred to as "Forum Blue") and Gold. Under Cooke's ownership, the Lakers reached seven NBA Finals and won the 1972 NBA championship.

==== Los Angeles Kings ====
As a Canadian, Cooke particularly enjoyed ice hockey, and he was determined to bring the National Hockey League (NHL) to Los Angeles. In 1966, the NHL announced it intended to sell six new franchises, and Cooke prepared a bid. The Los Angeles Memorial Coliseum Commission, which operated the Sports Arena, supported a competing bid headed by Los Angeles Rams owner Dan Reeves and advised Cooke that if he won the franchise he would not be allowed to use that facility. In response, Cooke threatened to build a new arena in the Los Angeles suburb of Inglewood. Nearly 30 years later Cooke told the Los Angeles Times sportswriter Steve Springer that he recalled "one official representing the commission laughing at him" (Springer's words) when Cooke warned he would build in Inglewood. Cooke won the franchise, and paid $2 million for the new Los Angeles NHL club, which he called the "Kings." Springer: "Cooke went to Inglewood and built the Forum. Good-bye, Lakers. Good-bye, Kings." The Kings played their first game on October 14, 1967—at the Long Beach Arena while construction was being completed at Cooke's new arena.

Cooke claimed The Forum would be "the most beautiful arena in the world." It opened December 30, 1967, to rave reviews. Cooke was soon calling it "The Fabulous Forum." However, the Kings struggled both on the ice and at the gate. Cooke had been told that there were more than 300,000 former Canadians living within a three-hour drive of Los Angeles and remarked, "Now I know why they left Canada: They hate hockey!"

In May 1979, Cooke sold the Forum, the Kings, and the Lakers to Jerry Buss for a then-record $67.5 million (equivalent to $299 million in 2025); half of the payment was in cash and half was in real estate, with part of Buss's payment including the Chrysler Building.

==== Los Angeles Wolves ====
In 1967, Cooke was a founder of the United Soccer Association and owned the Los Angeles Wolves team, which became a charter NASL team the following year.

==== Boxing ====
In 1971, Cooke was a financial backer of the first Muhammad Ali vs Joe Frazier boxing match, held at Madison Square Garden and won by Frazier.

==== Elmendorf Farm ====
A lover of horses and a fan of Thoroughbred horse racing, Cooke owned Kent Farms, a 640-acre (2.6 km^{2}) estate in Middleburg, Virginia, not far from Washington, D.C. In December 1984 he purchased the historic Elmendorf Farm in Lexington, Kentucky from the estate of Maxwell Gluck. He bred and raced a number of successful horses, notably Flying Continental, sired by Flying Paster, whose wins included the 1990 Jockey Club Gold Cup.

== Personal life ==
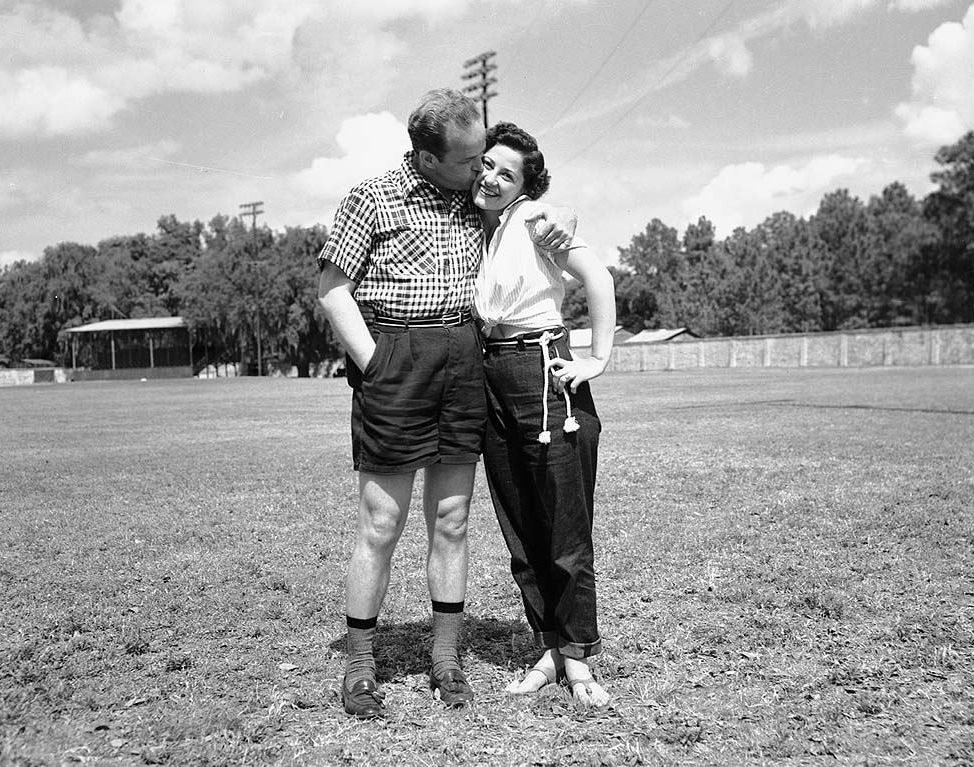
Cooke and his wife Jean in 1955

Cooke was married five times, however his last two marriages were to the same woman, Marlene Ramallo Chalmers. He was married to Chalmers at the time of his death.

Cooke's first marriage, his longest, lasted 45 years. He and 17-year-old Barbara Jean Carnegie, married in 1934, divorcing in 1979. In the legal action, Carnegie was awarded what was then the largest divorce settlement in history—$42 million (equivalent to $186 million in 2025). The "record divorce settlement precipitated his sale of the Lakers, the Kings and the Forum to Jerry Buss". The presiding judge during the bench trial was Joseph Wapner, who later became famous as the judge on television's The People's Court. Cooke and Carnegie had two sons: John Kent Cooke and Ralph Kent Cooke. Ralph Kent Cooke's son, Jack Kent Cooke II, "died of alcoholic liver disease and a related heart condition", at 26, in January 1989.

On October 31, 1980, Cooke married Jeanne Maxwell Williams, a sculptor from Las Vegas. The marriage lasted 10 months. It ended with a $1 million (equivalent to $4 million in 2025) divorce settlement.

Cooke's third marriage on July 24, 1987, to Suzanne Elizabeth Martin, a college dropout aged 31 at the time and 43 years his junior, was even shorter at 73 days. Cooke agreed to marry Martin if she signed a prenuptial agreement and aborted the first-trimester fetus she was carrying (as a result of having skipped taking one or two birth control pills). It would have been her third abortion in two years. After their wedding, Martin told Cooke she had changed her mind, deciding to keep the baby, and she and Cooke separated four weeks later. After they divorced, Martin gave birth to a girl who was named Jacqueline Kent Cooke. In her divorce action, where her lawyers used the child as a "wedge", Martin sought $15 million (equivalent to $43 million in 2025) from Cooke, plus $18,000 ($51,000 in current dollar terms) a month in alimony and child support. In Fauquier County Circuit Court, a judge rejected Martin's request that he ignore the prenuptial agreement, and improve her financial settlement in which she received a $75,000 ($213,000 in current dollar terms) annual stipend, a Jaguar, and the use for five years of an apartment in the Watergate complex. Cooke's lawyer Milton Gould said: "This is a conspiracy to try to use a little kid as a means of getting money. Well, we're not going to abandon this child. She will get money but the woman doesn't deserve any...there have been few courtesans in the history of the world who have been as well rewarded as this one."

Cooke married his fourth wife, Marlene Ramallo Chalmers on May 5, 1990. They were divorced in late 1993 after she made headlines in September by driving drunk in the Georgetown section of Washington, D.C., with a man holding onto the hood and pounding on the windshield of her car. They remarried in 1995 and remained together until his death.

Cooke died of congestive heart failure on April 6, 1997, at George Washington University Hospital in Washington, D.C. A memorial service was held at Trinity Episcopal Church in Upperville, Virginia, on April 10 and was attended by more than 400 Washington and sports dignitaries.

His will received considerable public attention. His will gave his daughter Jacqueline a trust fund of $5 million (equivalent to $10 million in 2025) but nothing to her mother, Suzanne Elizabeth Martin, "because of her misconduct and behavior which were calculated to harm me". His final wife, Marlene Ramallo Chalmers, was also cut out of his will; she filed a lawsuit against Cooke's estate and reportedly received $20 million in a settlement about a year after Cooke's death.

"The Jack Kent Cooke Foundation is dedicated to advancing the education of exceptionally promising students who have financial need."

— Jack Kent Cooke Foundation website

The bulk of Cooke's $825 million estate went into establishing the Jack Kent Cooke Foundation, whose stated mission was to "help young people of exceptional promise reach their full potential through education." The scholarship program available to high-achieving high school seniors with financial need who seek to attend and graduate from the nation's best four-year colleges and universities. Cooke, an autodidact who didn't have the opportunity to get a college education due to the Great Depression, was a longtime supporter of the UNCF. He was described as a lover of the written word, and his commitment explicitly sought to "support the dreams of the next generation of big thinkers that came from challenging backgrounds, regardless of race, creed, color, gender, or national origin."

In February 2007, his daughter Jacqueline filed a $275 million lawsuit against the estate, seeking more money than her $5 million trust fund. Jacqueline Kent Cooke died on October 18, 2024, at the age of 36.

== Awards and honours ==
- 3× Super Bowl champion (XVII, XXII, XXVI; as owner of the Washington Redskins)
- NBA champion (1972; Los Angeles Lakers)
- Washington Commanders Ring of Fame
