= Heyward Dotson =

American basketball player, attorney, and civil servant (1948–2020)

Heyward Harrell Dotson
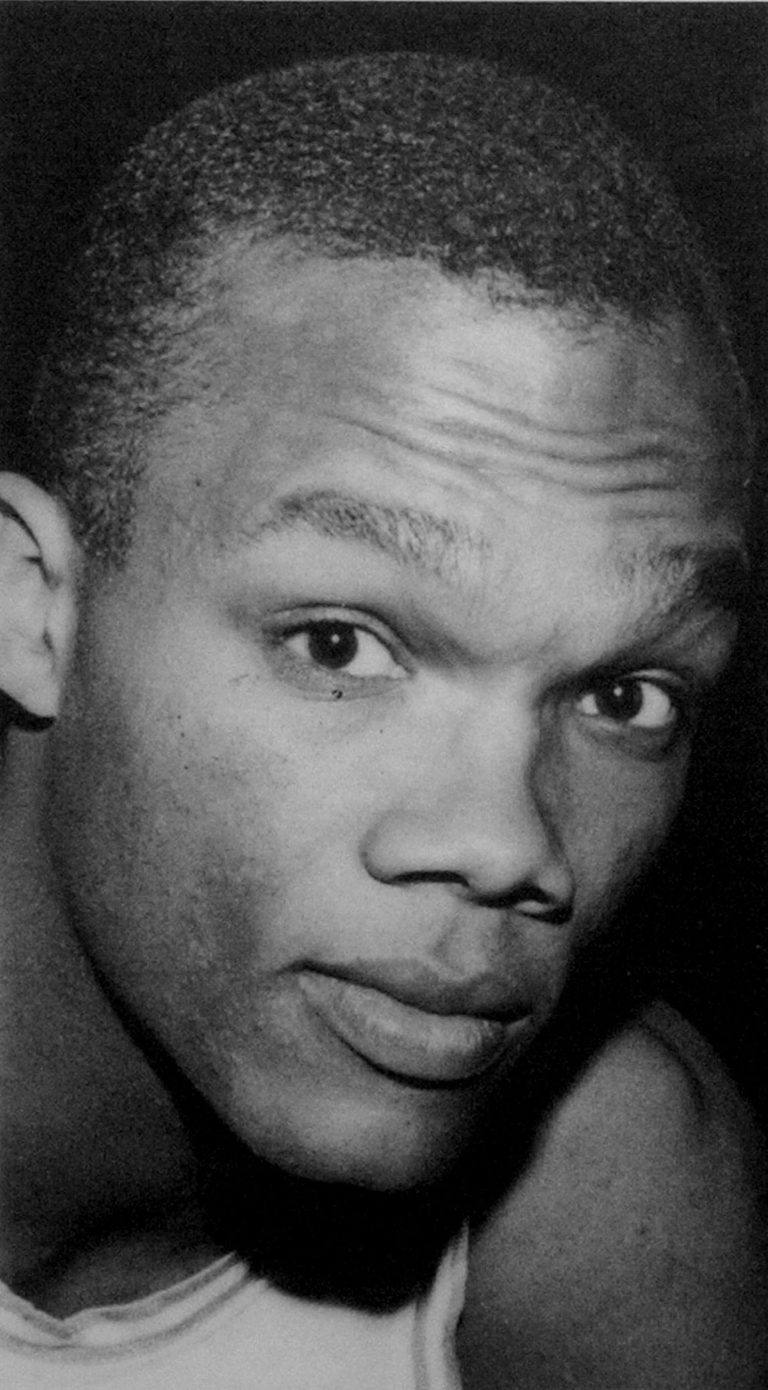

Personal information
- Born: July 12, 1948 Lugoff, South Carolina, U.S.
- Died: May 5, 2020 (aged 71) New York City, New York, U.S.
- Listed height: 6 ft 4 in (1.93 m)

Career information
- High school: Stuyvesant (New York City, New York)
- College: Columbia University (1967-1970)
- Number: 11, 44
- Stats at Basketball Reference

Heyward Harrell Dotson (July 12, 1948 – May 1, 2020) was an American professional basketball player, attorney, and civil servant. He was a member of the Columbia Lions men's basketball team that won the Ivy League championship in the 1967–1968 season. After graduating, he was awarded a Rhodes Scholarship to study at Worcester College, Oxford.

== Biography ==
Dotson was born on July 12, 1948, in Lugoff, South Carolina and was raised on Staten Island. He played basketball for Stuyvesant High School before attending Columbia University on a scholarship.

He was a member of Columbia Lions men's basketball team, where he averaged 13.7 points a game and led the Lions in assists, helping the team capture the Ivy League Men's Basketball championship title during the 1967–1968 season and earn a spot in the 1968 NCAA University Division basketball tournament. Dotson averaged more than 18 points a game in the 1968-69 and 1969-70 seasons. He averaged 16.7 points a game, and finished his career with 1,266 points, making him the first basketball player from Staten Island to ever score 1,000 points at both the high school and collegiate levels. Dotson was initiated into the Eta chapter of the Alpha Phi Alpha fraternity.

After graduating in 1970, Dotson was drafted by the Phoenix Suns and Indiana Pacers. He declined to join either franchise and studied European history at Worcester College, Oxford, on a Rhodes Scholarship. He was Staten Island's first Rhodes Scholar. At Oxford, Dotson was a member of its men's basketball team and led the Blues to the 1971 B.U.S.F. National Championship. After Oxford, Dotson was traded to the New York Knicks, which cut him. He then played for the Kentucky Colonels in the American Basketball Association.

Dotson then graduated from Columbia Law School in 1976 and worked for Shea & Gould. He later joined the office of assemblymen Keith L. T. Wright and then the New York City Comptroller's Office. He also served as a professor at the Metropolitan College of New York. He ran for the New York City Council in 2001 but lost in the primaries, and worked as a substitute teacher in Harlem.

Dotson sued the New York City government in 2012, when courthouse guards forced him to pass through a metal detector and caused his defibrillator to go haywire.

Dotson died of liver failure on May 1, 2020, in The Bronx.
