= A Night in New Arabia =

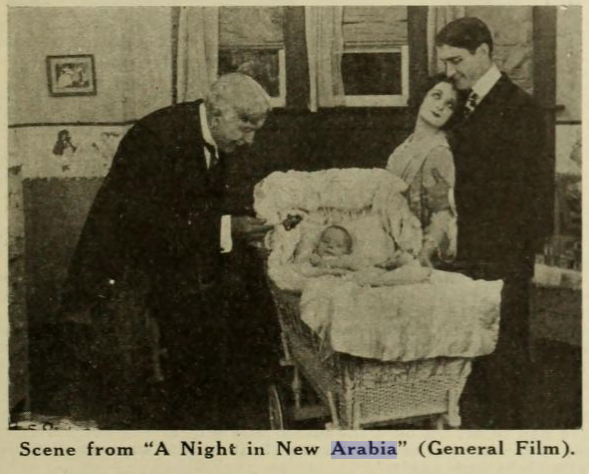
- Directed by: Thomas R. Mills
- Written by: F. R. Buckley
- Based on: O. Henry
- Produced by: Vitagraph/Broadway Star Features Co.
- Starring: Frank Glendon; Patsy De Forest; Horace Vinton; Hattie Dalaro; Hazlan Drouart
- Distributed by: General Film Co.
- Release date: October 22, 1917
- Running time: 4 reels (Approx. 60 minutes)
- Country: United States
- Language: Silent (English intertitles).

A Night in New Arabia is a lost 1917 four-reel silent film, directed by Thomas Mills. It is based on the short story "A Night in New Arabia" from Strictly Business, a collection of 23 short stories by O. Henry published in 1910. The movie critic for the Moving Picture World, Margaret I. MacDonald, says that it "...is one of the best of the O. Henry four-part features".

The picture was part of the O. Henry Stories series of films produced by Vitagraph Studios/Broadway Star Features and distributed by the General Film Company. All based on O. Henry short stories, these pictures featured many of the same actors and included Friends in San Rosario, The Third Ingredient, The Marionettes, The Green Door, Past One at Rooney's, The Cop and the Anthem, The Gold That Glittered, The Duplicity of Hargraves, The Guilty Party, The Last Leaf and The Love Philtre of Ikey Schoenstein.

== Cast ==
- Frank Glendon as Tom McLeod
- Patsy De Forest as Celia Spraggins
- Horace Vinton as Jacob Spraggins
- Hattie Delaro as Henrietta
- Hazlan Drouart as Annette McCorkle
