= William H. Thompson (actor) =

American actor

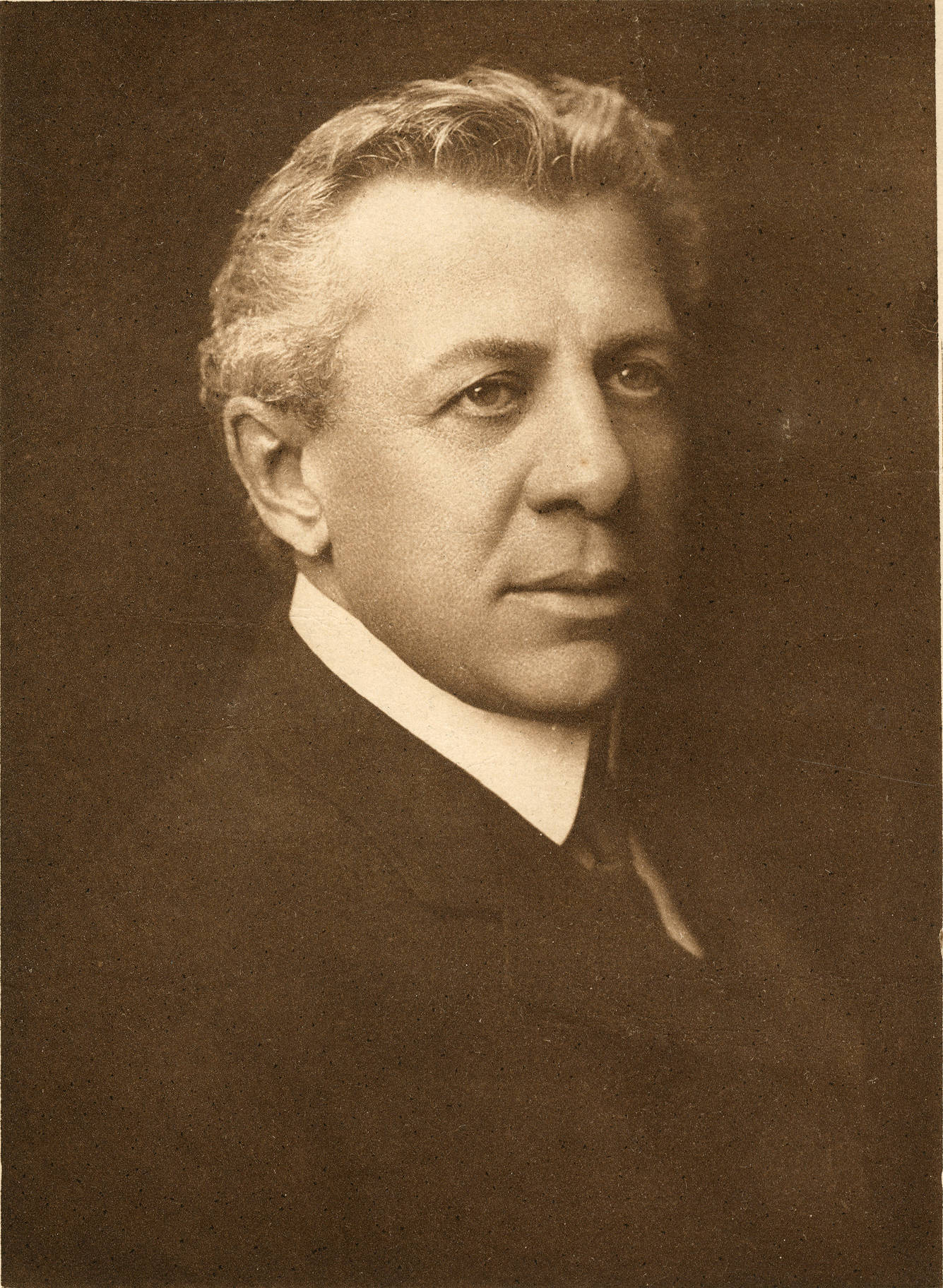
- Born: April 24, 1852; Scotland
- Died: February 4, 1923 (aged 70); New York City, U.S.
- Occupation: Actor
- Spouse: Isabel Irving (1899 - 1923)
- Parent: Joseph Thompson

William H. Thompson (April 24, 1852 – February 4, 1923) was an American actor on stage, in vaudeville, and in films.

== Early years ==
Thompson was born in Scotland on April 24, 1852 and came to the United States when he was six years old. Both of his grandfathers were ministers, and his father was Joseph Thompson, a clergyman of Scotch Presbyterian Church. He also had an aunt who was an actress.

When he was young, Thompson worked as a call boy at Daly's Theater in New York. By the time he was 14 years old, he knew the lines and plots of most classic plays, leading experienced actors to refer to him as "the human prompt book". When his father died and left his entire estate of $130,000 for constructing a memorial temple in New York City, Thompson decided to become an actor. By age 20 he was playing second-character parts.

== Career ==
Thompson was a member of the original California Theater Company. His career took him from San Francisco to Broadway and then to vaudeville. His Broadway debut came in The Girl I Left Behind Me (1893). He performed in at least 36 Broadway plays, ending with The Czarina (1922).

In 1907, Thompson was among the first actors to leave the legitimate theater to perform in vaudeville. He encouraged other established actors to make that transition and he encouraged young performers in vaudeville, helping them to meet the public's demands. In 1908, he told a reporter, "I had just as soon portray for 20 minutes a character in vaudeville, if only it be worthy, as to play a role in a five-act drama." In 1910, Thompson had his own vaudeville troupe. Its works included performing the sketch Pride of the Regiment at Shea's Theater in Buffalo, New York.

Thompson never sought stardom. Shortly after his death, The Brooklyn Daily Eagle said, "for twenty years he was acknowledged as the best character actor in New York. . . . He played almost everything and he played well everything he tried."

After he had rejected offers to appear in films, Thompson took on the role of Andrew Cameron, uncle of the title character in Peggy (1916). He went on to appear in other films, including Civilization's Child (1916) and The Eye of the Night (1916).

== Personal life and death ==
Thompson married actress Isabel Irving on October 19, 1899 in New Jersey. On February 4, 1923, he died of pneumonia at his home in Manhattan.
