= Ingram Yuzek =

American law firm

Ingram Yuzek Gainen Carroll & Bertolotti, LLP
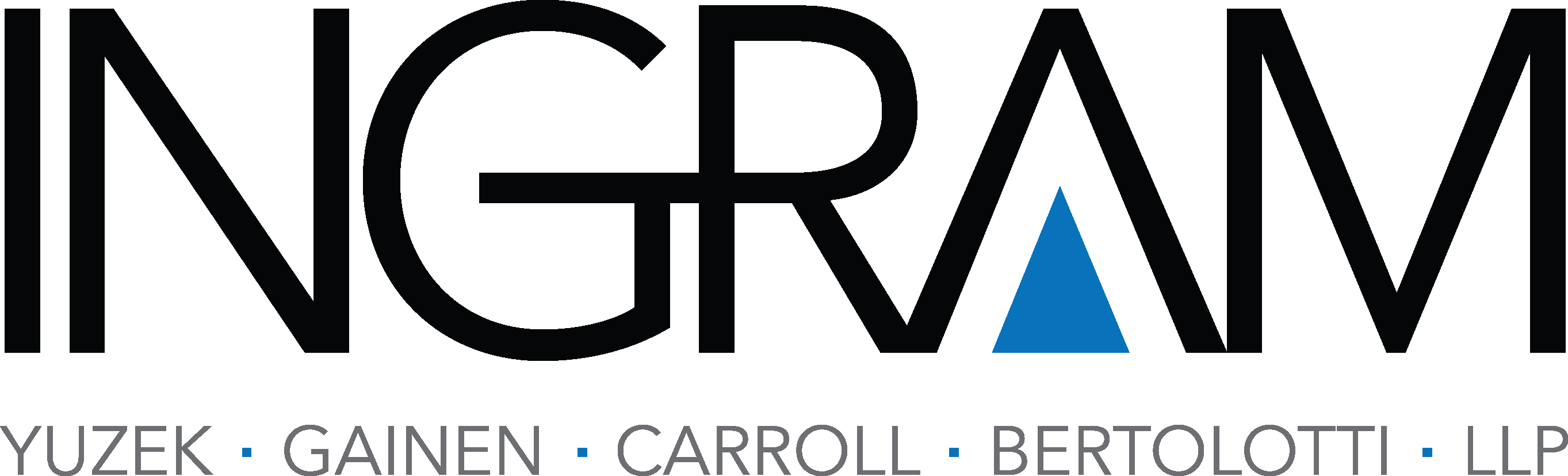
- Headquarters: 150 East 42nd Street, FL 19, New York, NY 10017
- No. of offices: 1
- Major practice areas: Commercial Real Estate, Construction & Design, Landlord-Tenant, Corporate & Business, Commercial Litigation
- Date founded: 1989
- Company type: Limited liability partnership
- Dissolved: May 2024
- Website: www.ingramllp.com

Ingram Yuzek Gainen Carroll & Bertolotti, LLP (full name: Ingram Yuzek Gainen Carroll & Bertolotti, LLP) was an American law firm based in New York City. Ingram Yuzek had more than 30 lawyers practicing in 15 practice areas.

== History ==
Ingram Yuzek Gainen Carroll & Bertolotti, LLP was founded in 1989 when five partners spun off from New York law firm Shea & Gould.

The company was dissolved in May 2024 according to a closure notice posted on the company website.

== Legal services ==
Ingram Yuzek Gainen Carroll & Bertolotti, LLP was a full service law firm providing a broad range of transactional and dispute resolution services in practice areas including: antitrust, commercial litigation, construction and design, corporate and commercial, creditors' rights, intellectual property, interior and product design, IT and e-commerce, labor and employment, landlord and tenant, privacy and information management, real estate and taxation. The firm also had an Asia practice group and a general counsel group.

== Recognition ==
Ingram Yuzek Gainen Carroll & Bertolotti, LLP was a "New York Area Top Ranked Firm." Ingram Yuzek was the New York representative of the Legal Netlink Alliance, an association of small, midsized, general practice and independent law firms.

== See also ==
- A&O Shearman
