= Anna Lehr =

American actress (1890–1974)

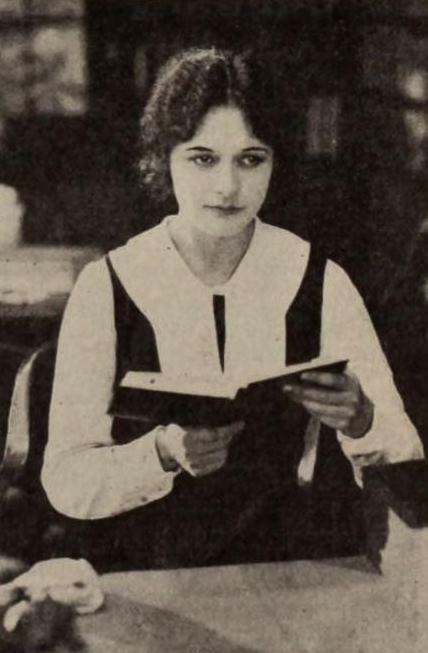
- Lehr in The Truth About Husbands (1920)
- Born: November 17, 1890; New York City, U.S.
- Died: January 22, 1974 (aged 83); Santa Monica, California. U.S.
- Occupation: Actress
- Spouse: Edwin McKim (divorced)
- Children: Ann Dvorak

Anna Lehr (November 17, 1890 – January 22, 1974) was an American silent film and stage actress.

== Biography ==
Born in New York City to Austrian immigrant parents, Frank Lehr and Emilie Freisinger, Anna Lehr filmed Civilization's Child (1916) for Thomas Ince, a Triangle–Kay Bee feature. The screenplay was written by C. Gardner Sullivan. There is a scene in which Russian cavalry charge over her as she lies prostrate on the ground. Lehr's fear was abated somewhat by her belief that horses will not step on people except by accident. She played "Doris Ames" in the silent film Grafters (1917), which was directed by Allan Dwan.

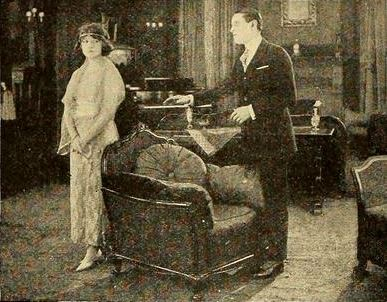
Lehr and Taylor Holmes in Upside Down (1919)

In 1919, Lehr was chosen by David Powell to play in Teeth of the Tiger. She was forced to withdraw due to ptomaine poisoning. The movie was being filmed by Famous Players–Lasky in New York City. Lehr's continued absence necessitated the retaking of scenes which she had completed.

She was sued by Chappell, Inc., in 1921 for nonpayment of $916.85 worth of hats, gowns, and cloaks. Lehr testified that she had intended to pay for the merchandise but delayed after a sheriff and collectors began bothering her. Chappell contended that when she did not return to their store to make arrangements for payment, they had a right to send out to collect the amount owed them. Her attorney sought dismissal of the case on the grounds that Edwin McKim was made a party to the suit, but had not been served; McKim was in New York City at the time. The case was carried out in the Los Angeles, California court of Judge J.P. Wood.

== Family ==
She was married to Edwin McKim; their daughter was actress Ann Dvorak. The couple divorced when Dvorak was nine or ten years old, and she and her father had no contact with each other for nearly 14 years. She finally reconnected with him "through a newspaper appeal" in 1934.

== Death ==
Lehr died in Santa Monica, California, aged 83, in 1974, predeceasing her daughter, Ann Dvorak, by only five years.

== Partial filmography ==
Year	Title	Role	Notes
1912	A Simple Life	Marie Smith	
1914	Should a Woman Divorce?		
1915	The White Scar	Wehnonah	
1916	Civilization's Child	Berna	
1917	Grafters	Doris Ames	
1917	Parentage	Mrs. Brown	
1918	The Other Woman	Mrs. Harrington	
1918	My Own United States	Agnes Churchill	
1918	Men	Laura Burton	Lost film
1918	The Yellow Ticket	Mary Varenka	Lost film
1918	Laughing Bill Hyde	Ponotah	
1918	The Birth of a Race		
1919	Thunderbolts of Fate	Eleanor Brewster	
1919	Home Wanted	Letty Thompson	
1920	A Child for Sale	Catherine Bell	
1920	The Truth About Husbands	Janet Preece	
1920	The Valley of Doubt	Annice	
1921	Cheated Hearts	Naomi	Lost film
1921	Mr. Barnes of New York	Marina Paoli	
1923	Ruggles of Red Gap	Mrs. Belknap-Jackson	
