= Isabel Irving =

American actress (1871–1944)

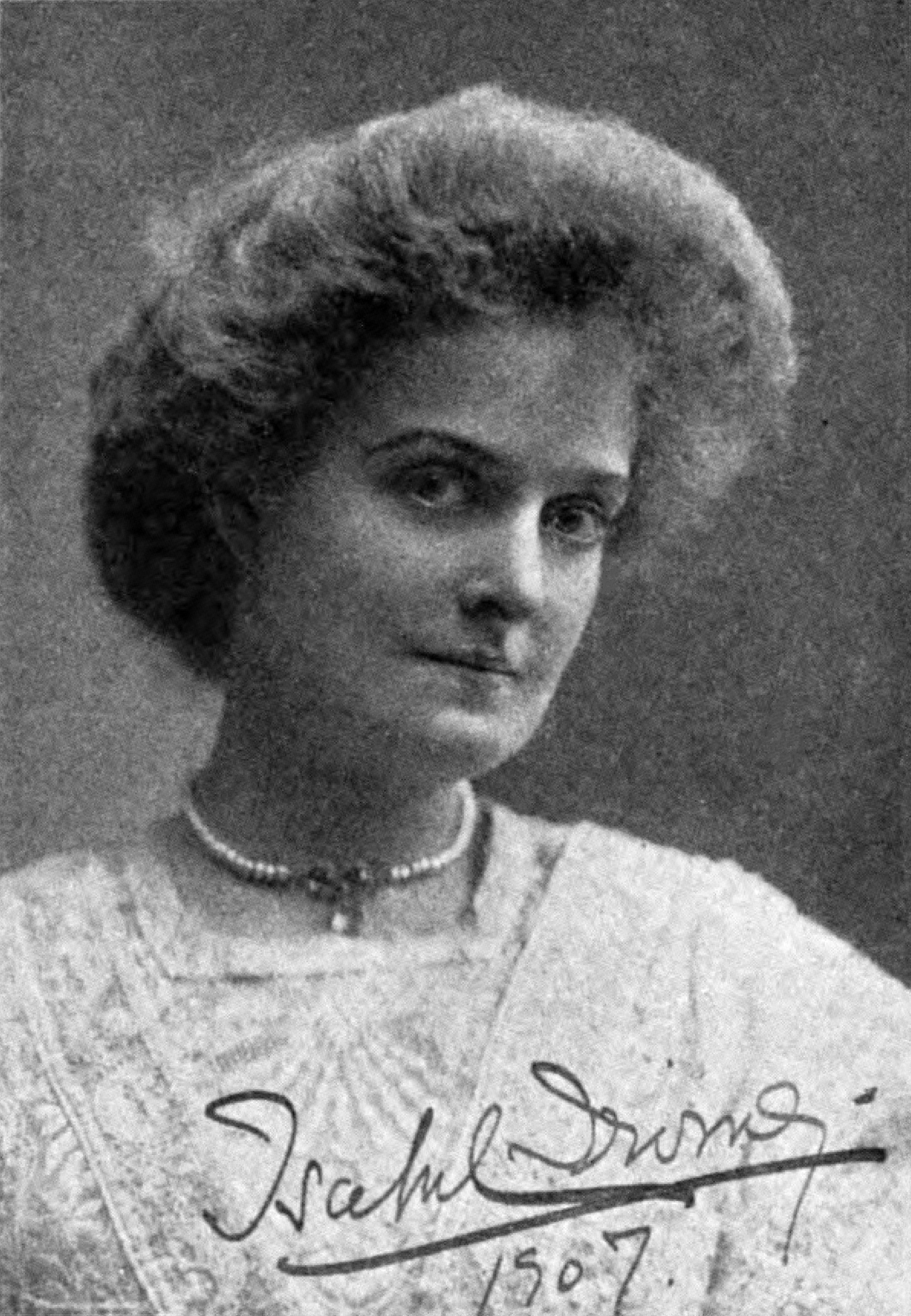
- Isabel Irving, ca. 1907
- Born: February 28, 1871; Bridgeport, Connecticut
- Died: September 1, 1944 (aged 73); Nantucket, Massachusetts
- Years active: 1887–1936
- Spouse: William H. Thompson (1899 – 1923)

Isabel Irving (February 28, 1871 –September 1, 1944) was an American stage actress. Born in Bridgeport, Connecticut, she was educated in schools in New York City where she made her professional debut on Broadway at the Standard Theatre in 1886. From 1888-1893 she was a member of Augustin Daly's theatre troupe with whom she appeared in several productions on Broadway and on tour. With Daly's company she made her London debut at the Lyceum Theatre in 1890 as Daisy in Nancy and Company. After this she worked for Daniel Frohman for three years. She maintained a busy career until her retirement in 1936.

== Life ==
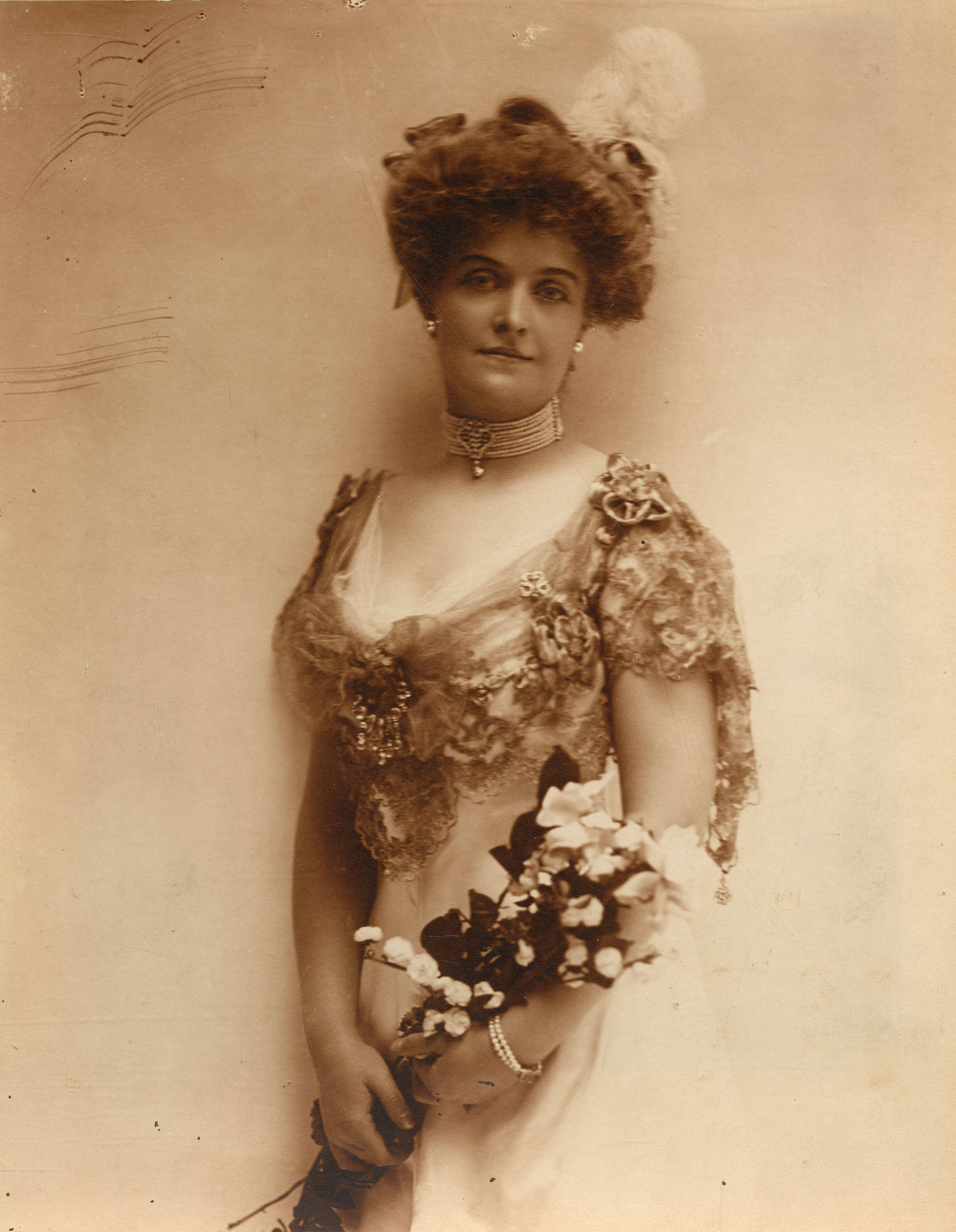
Isabel Irving, a 1907 photograph

Isabel Irving was born in Bridgeport, Connecticut on February 28, 1871 to Charles Washington and Isabella Irving. She was educated in schools in New York City. She made her professional stage debut in New York as Gwendoline in Arthur Wing Pinero's The Schoolmistress at the Standard Theatre on December 7, 1886. The show was mounted by Rosina Vokes, and she remained a member of Voke's theatre troupe for next year and a half.

After this Irving joined Augustin Daly's theatre troupe for the 1888-1889 season; making her debut with his company as the waiting maid Dobbin in Popping the Question. Her other early role with the company was that of Oberon in William Shakespeare's A Midsummer Night's Dream. In 1890 she made her debut on the London stage with Daly's company as Daisy in Nancy and Co. at the Lyceum Theatre.

Irving continued as a member of Daly's company through 1893; portraying parts in Needles and Pins (as Caroline), The Arabian Nights (as Daisy Maitland), An International Match (as Jenny), The Great Unknown (as Pansy), As You Like It (as Audrey), The Hunchback (as Helen), The Last Word (as Faith Rutherell),The Prodigal Son, A Priceless Paragon (as Susette), The Critic, Love's Labor Lost (as Katherine), The Cabinet Minister (as Imogene), The Lottery of Love, Dollars and Sense (as Salina), and A Night Off.

In 1894 Irving signed a three year contract as with Daniel Frohman, the manager of the Lyceum Theatre in New York, to appear with his theatre company a leading actress. Until that time she had played the ingenue and other supporting roles. In 1897 she starred opposite John Drew Jr. in Sydney Grundy's A Marriage of Convenience at the Empire Theatre. In 1899, after a secret engagement, Irving married the actor William H. Thompson who died in 1923. In 1900 she performed at Hoyt's Theatre in the title role in Alfred Capus's The Husbands of Leontine and as Josephine Furet in Self and Lady. In 1901 she succeeded Blanche Bates as Cigarette in the Broadway production of Under Two Flags.

Irving starred in the 1905 Broadway revival of She Stoops to Conquer. In 1907 The Morning Oregonian called her a "a charming actress and comedienne" in reviewing her performance during her national tour in Susan In Search of a Husband. In 1911 she toured with Kyrle Bellew in The Mollusc. In 1928 she portrayed Mrs. Henry van der Luyden in Margaret Ayer Barnes's The Age of Innocence which was adapted from the novel by Edith Wharton.

She retired from her long career in theater in 1936 after completing her final tour in Three Wise Fools. She died in 1944 in Nantucket at 73.

== Gallery ==
Photographs of Isabel Irving
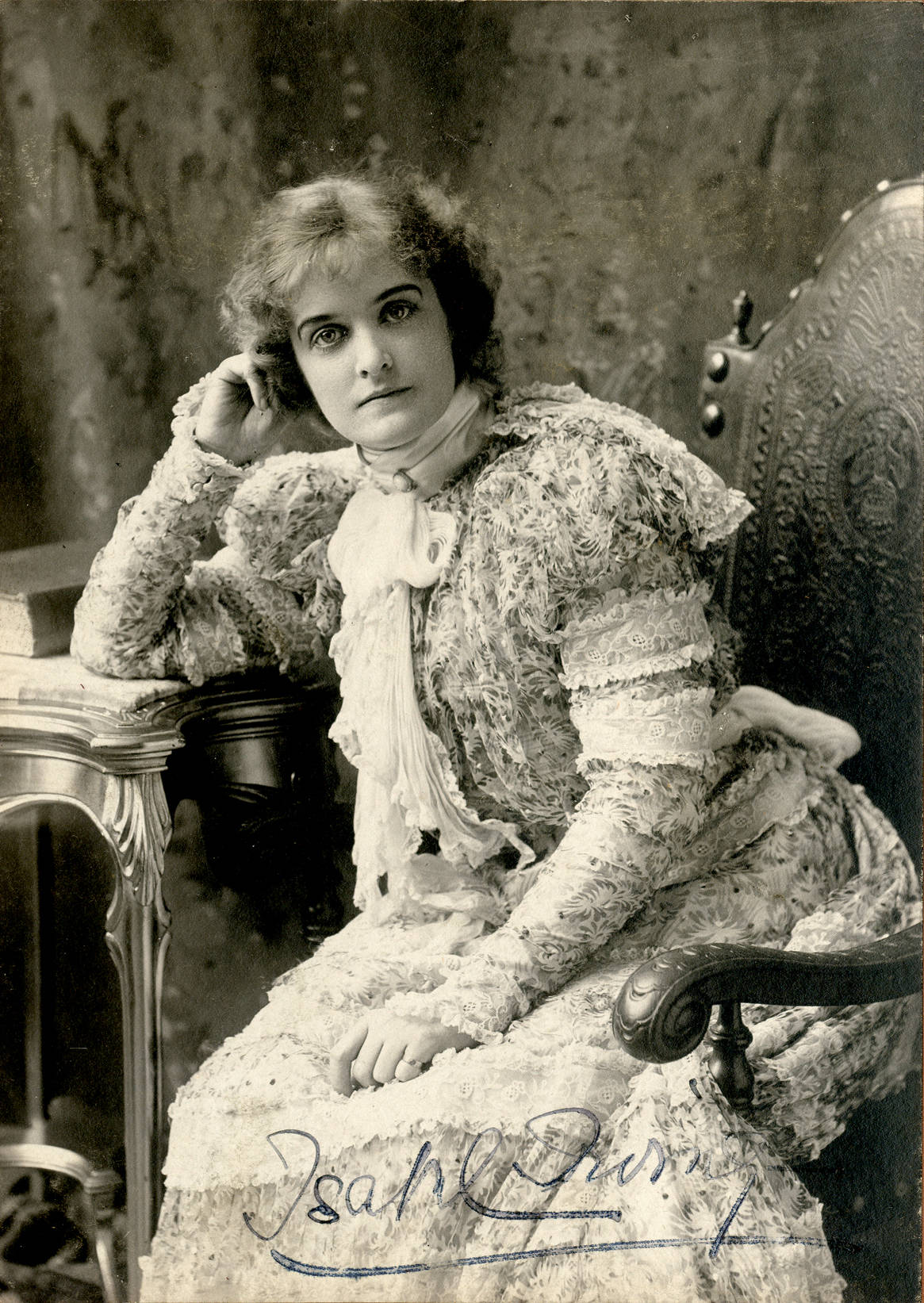
1907 photograph

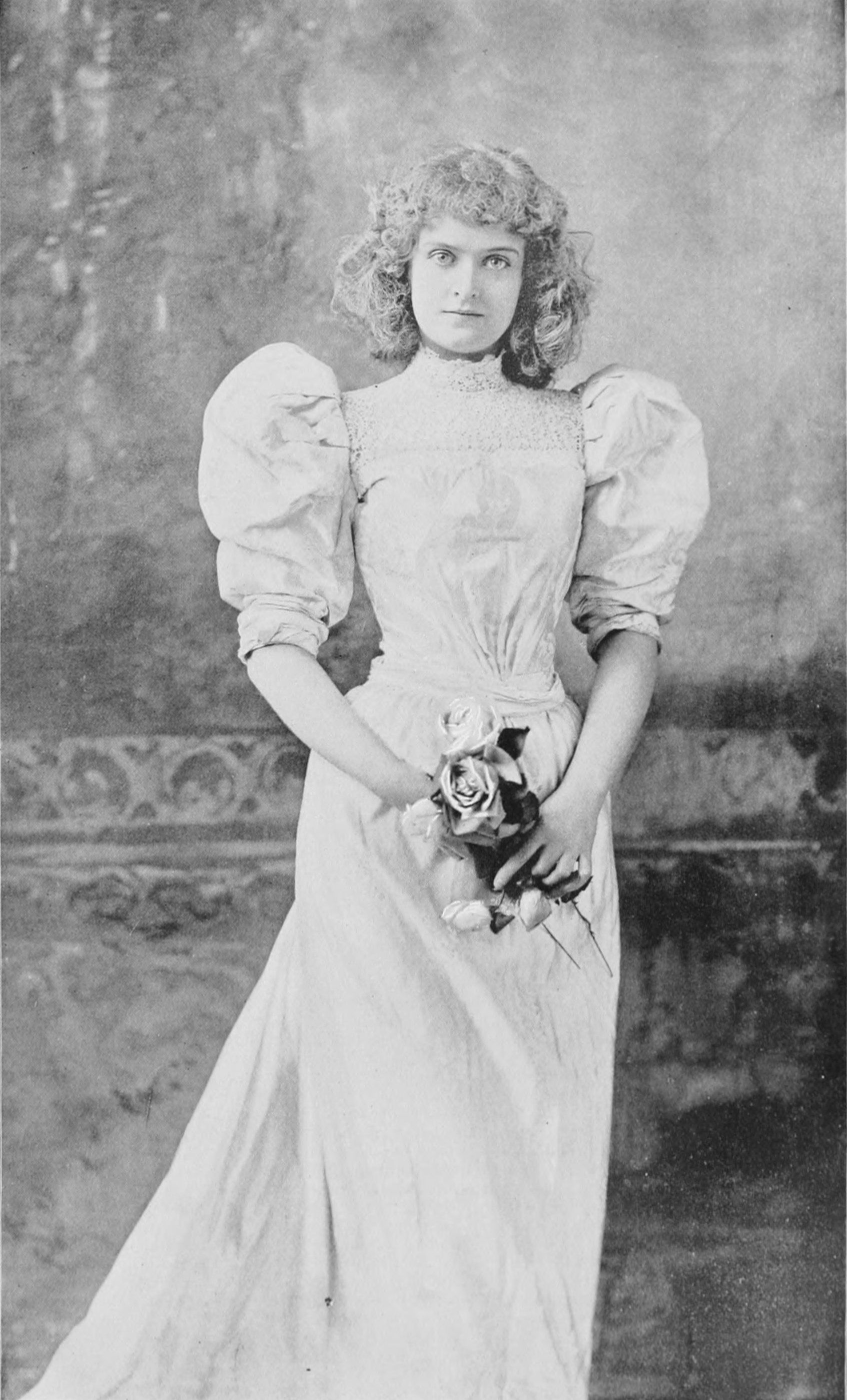
Photograph, ca. 1890/ca. 1900

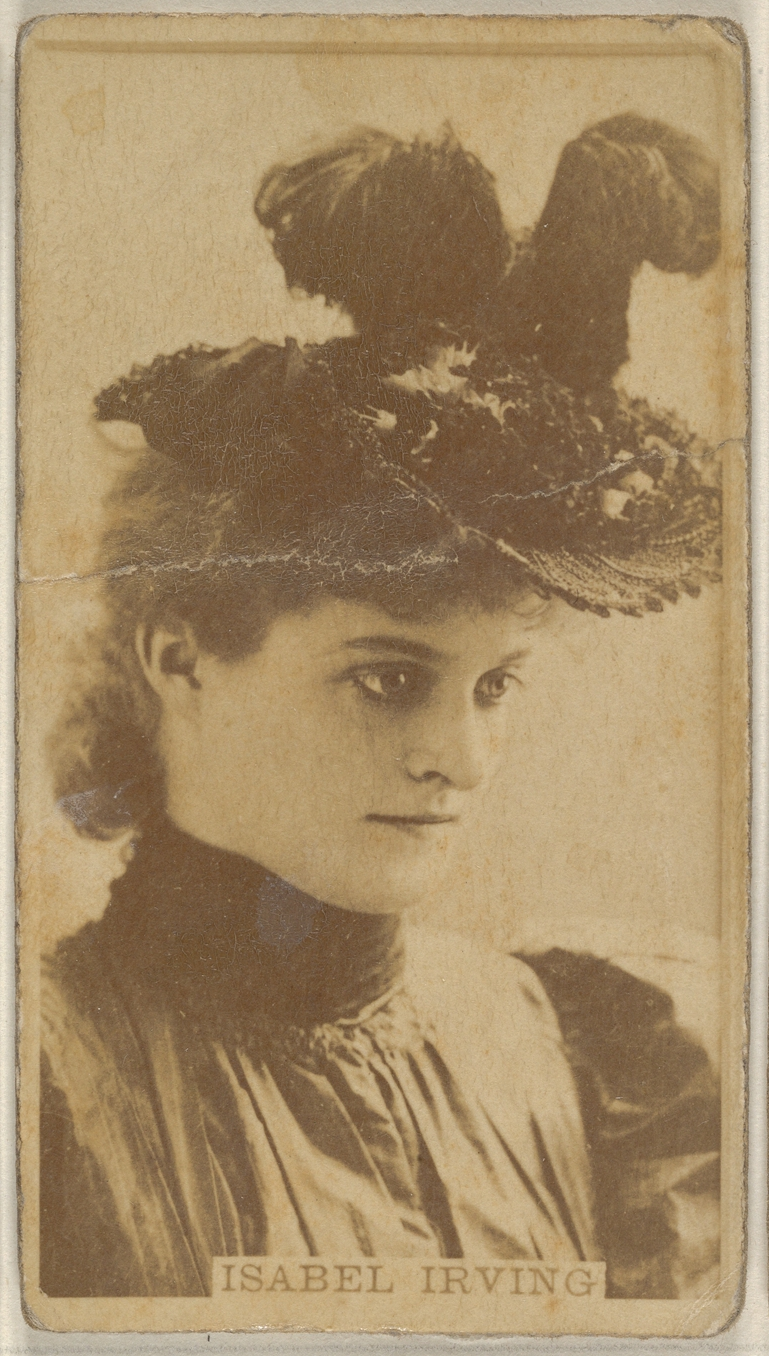
Photograph, ca. 1888

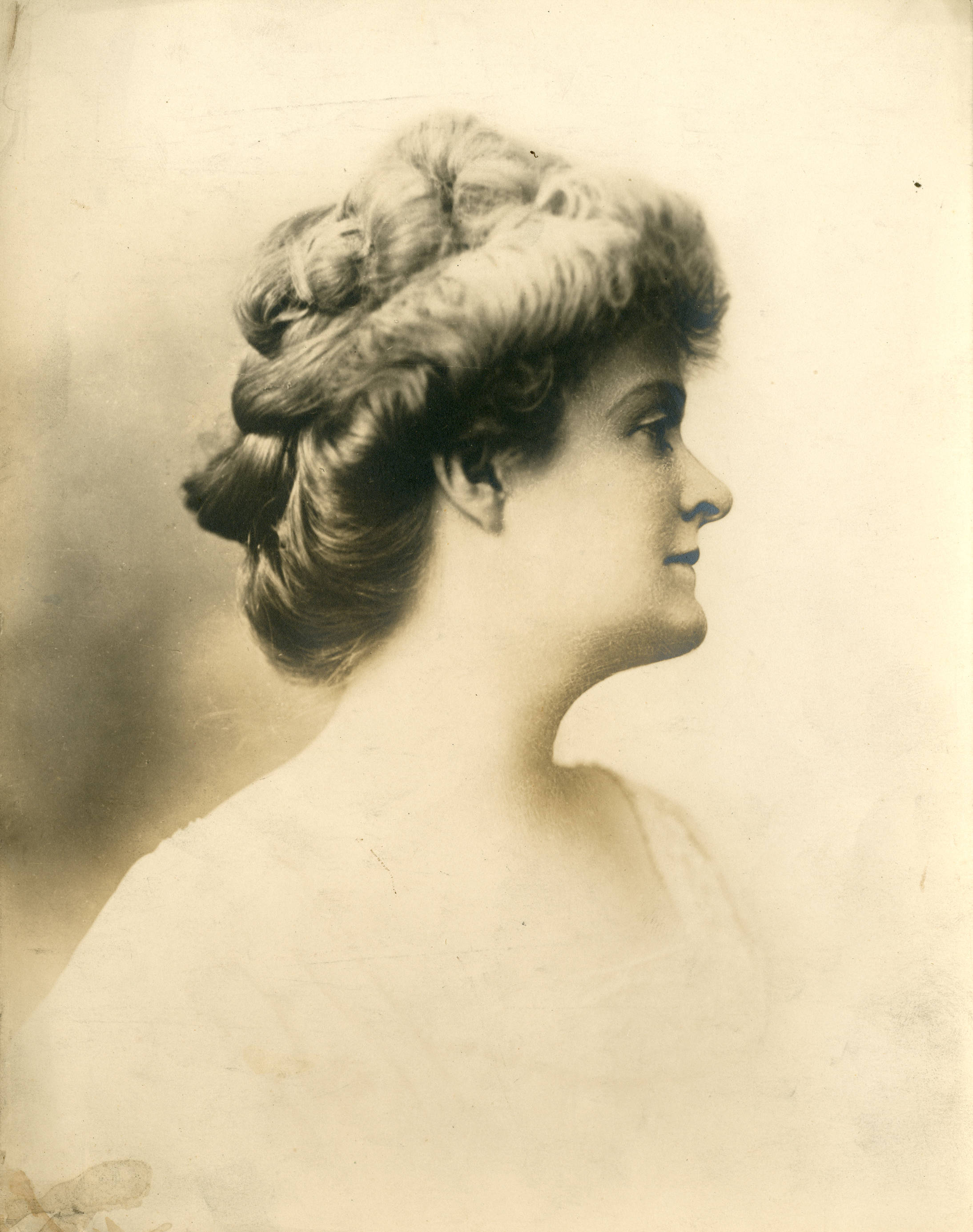
1913 photograph

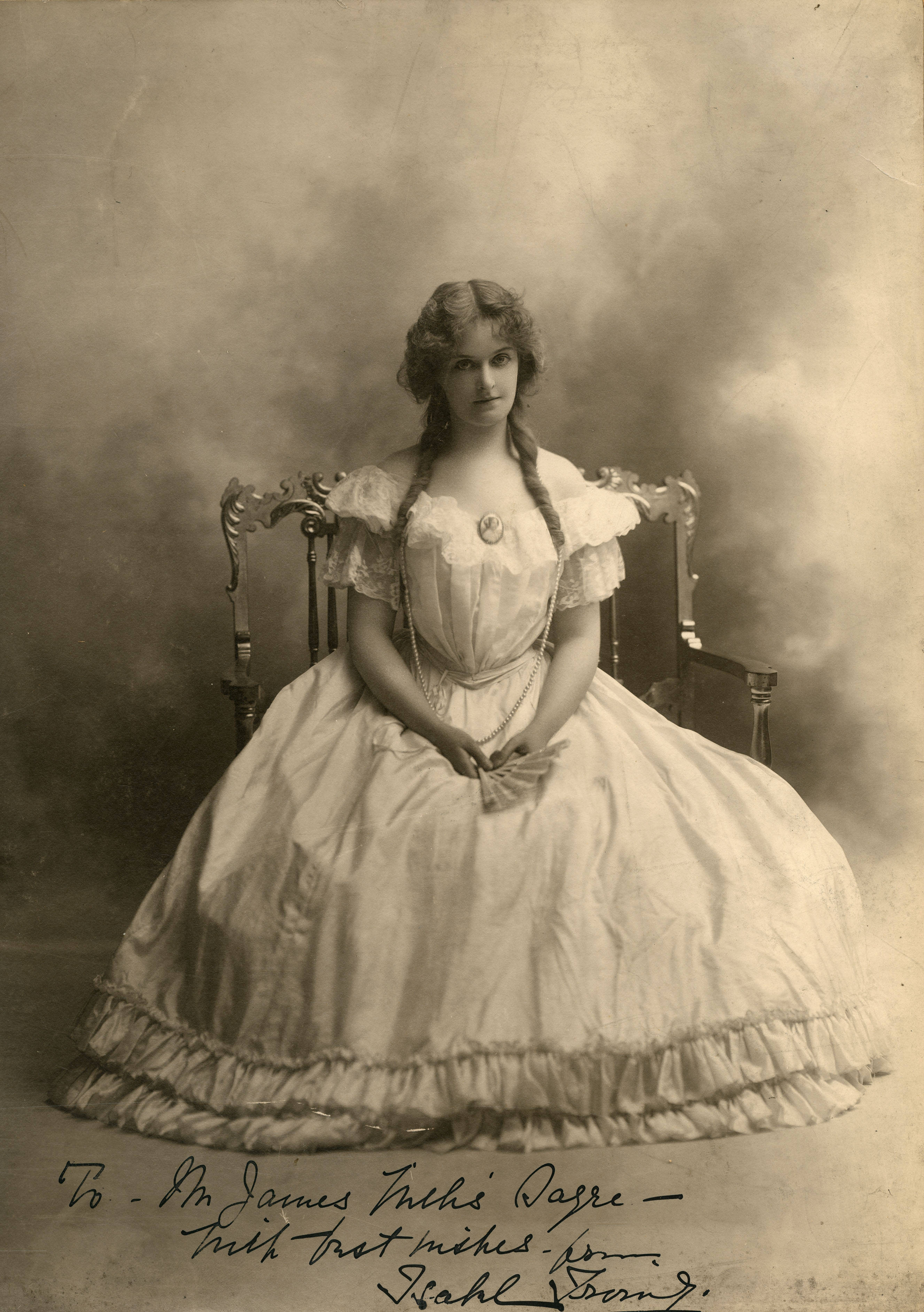
1904 photograph
