= Cheated Hearts (film) =

1921 film

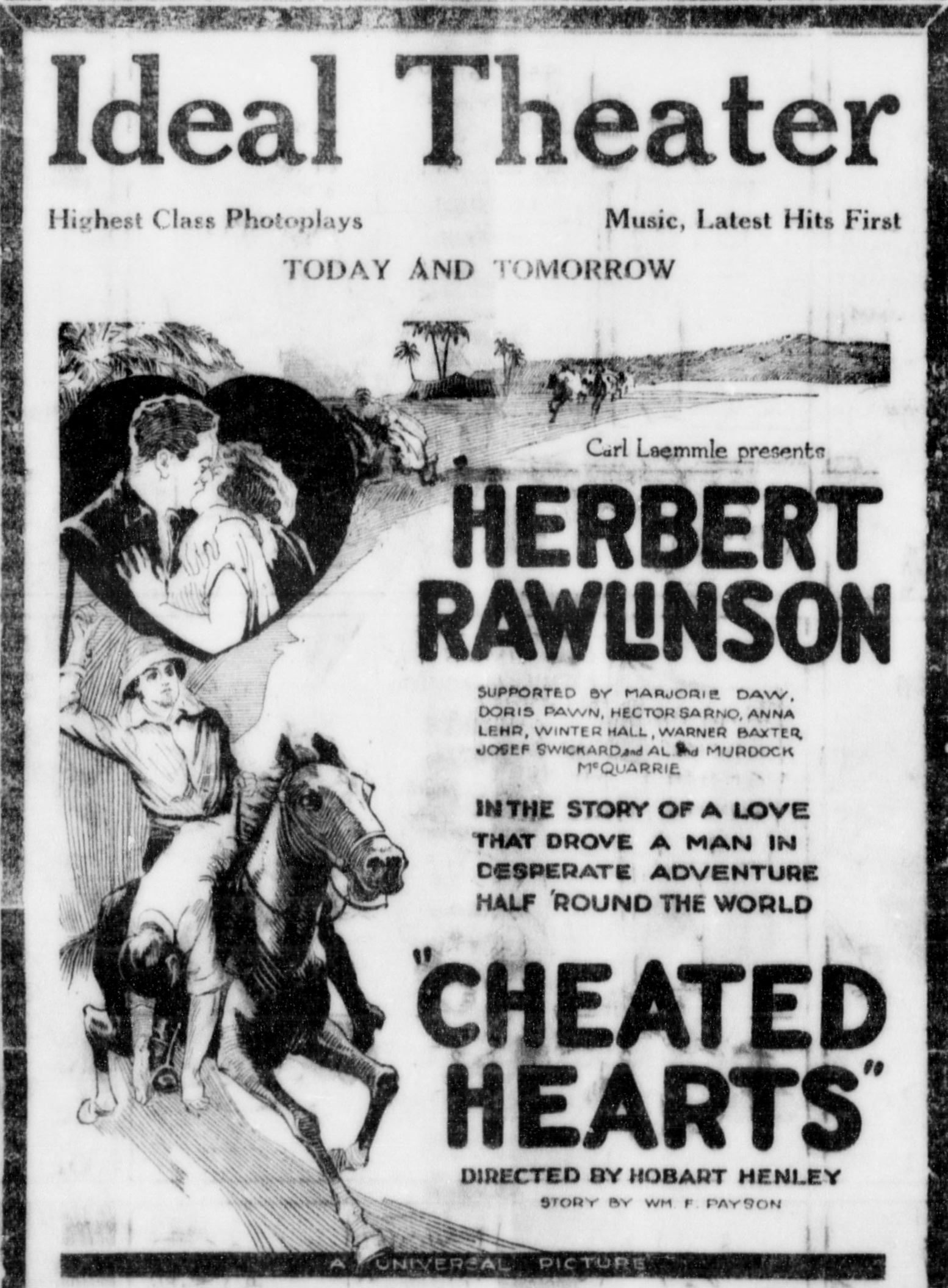
- Newspaper advertisement
- Directed by: Hobart Henley
- Written by: Wallace Clifton
- Story by: a novel "Barry Gordon" by William F. Payson
- Produced by: Carl Laemmle
- Starring: Herbert Rawlinson; Warner Baxter; Boris Karloff; Marjorie Daw
- Cinematography: Virgil Miller
- Distributed by: Universal Pictures
- Release date: December 12, 1921
- Running time: 5 reels (50 min.)
- Country: United States
- Language: Silent (English intertitles)

Cheated Hearts is a 1921 American silent drama film directed by Hobart Henley and featuring Herbert Rawlinson, Warner Baxter, Marjorie Daw and Boris Karloff. The screenplay was written by Wallace Clifton, based on the novel Barry Gordon by William Farquar Payson. The film's tagline was "All the Exotic Glamour of the East Woven in a Livid Picture of Love" (Print Ad in the Seattle Star, ((Seattle, Wash.)) 24 December 1921). It was shot in Universal City, and is today considered a lost film.

== Plot ==
Barry Gordon and his brother Tom, the sons of an old Virginia colonel, are both in love with Muriel Bekkman. Barry is a wastrel, however, and because he believes Muriel loves Tom the best, he takes to drinking heavily even though his father died of alcoholism. Barry goes to Paris thinking that Tom and Muriel will get married, but then receives word that his brother has been lost in Morocco. He goes to the nearest African village there and learns that his brother is being held captive by natives. He agrees to exchange places with Tom and pay the natives handsomely. Muriel and her father, Nathanial Beekman, arrive and are overjoyed when Tom is released from captivity, but now they are worried about Barry. Tom, however, is content to wait in the village instead of trying to aid his brother. Finally Barry, having escaped from a cave with the aid of a native girl named Naomi, who is killed helping him. Barry staggers into the village and Muriel, recognizing that he is truly the better man, declares her love for him. Barry decides to swear off drinking and marries Muriel.

== Cast ==
- Herbert Rawlinson as Barry Gordon
- Warner Baxter as Tom Gordon
- Marjorie Daw as Muriel Beekman
- Doris Pawn as Kitty Van Ness
- Winter Hall as Nathanial Beekman
- Josef Swickard as Colonel Fairfax Gordon
- Murdock MacQuarrie as Ibrahim
- Boris Karloff as Nei Hamid
- Anna Lehr as Naomi, the native girl
- Al MacQuarrie as Hassam
- Hector Sarno (aka Hector Samo) as Achmet

== See also ==
- List of American films of 1921
