= Edwin McKim =

American actor and director (1868-1942)

Samuel Edwin McKim (October 31, 1868 – March 31, 1942) was an actor and director of American silent films. He had directed films for Lubin Manufacturing Company, among other companies.

McKim was the father of actress Ann Dvorak, born during his marriage to silent film actress Anna Lehr. After Lehr and McKim divorced around 1921, Dvorak did not see McKim for 14 years, finally locating him after she began a public search. McKim confirmed paternity by sending footage of her as a child taken in Cuba when she was on location with her parents for a film. A man of modest means who insisted on paying for his own train ticket, McKim reunited with Ann in August 1934. She and husband Leslie Fenton met him at the train station in Pasadena, along with a lot of press photographers.

The reunion seemed to be a successful one, and Ann remained in contact with McKim until his death in 1942.

== Death ==
McKim died in Philadelphia on March 31, 1942.

== Selected filmography ==
- Oliver Twist (1912)
- Should a Woman Divorce? (director) (1914)
- The Butler (director) (1916)
