= A Simple Life (1912 film) =

- Written by: J. Russell O'Leary
- Produced by: Majestic Motion Picture Company
- Starring: William Lampe; Anna Lehr
- Distributed by: Film Supply Company
- Release date: October 13, 1912
- Running time: 1 reel
- Country: USA
- Language: Silent..English

A Simple Life is a 1912 silent short film comedy starring Anna Lehr.

A print is preserved in the Library of Congress collection.

== Cast ==
- William Lampe - Jack Vincent
- Anna Lehr - Marie Smith
- Paul Scardon - Cy Smith, Marie's Father (*as Mr. Scardon)
