= Milton S. Gould =

American lawyer (1909–1999)

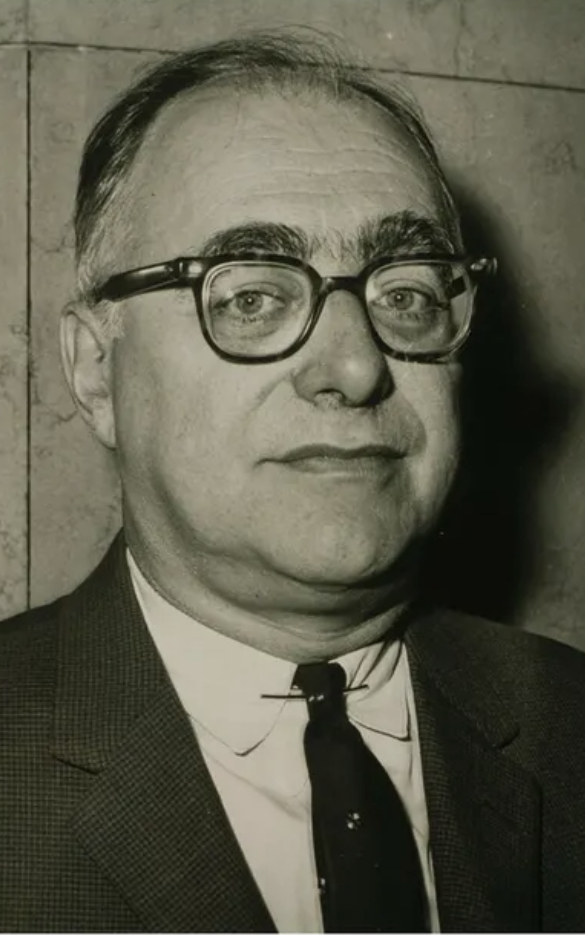

Milton S. Gould (October 8, 1909 – March 22, 1999) was a prominent New York City trial attorney.

== Early life ==
Milton S. Gould was born on October 8, 1909. He graduated from Cornell Law School in 1933.

== Career ==
Gould started his career as an attorney in New York City. Later, he joined the law firm Kaufman, Weitzman & Celler. The founders of that firm included Emanuel Celler, who later became a U.S. Congressman from Brooklyn, and Samuel H. Kaufman, who later served as a federal judge and presided over the first trial of Alger Hiss.

In 1964, Gould co-founded the law firm Shea & Gould with William Shea. Gould represented such clients as Aristotle Onassis, New York City Mayor Abraham Beame and the Reverend Sun Myung Moon. In 1971-1972, Gould returned to the Cornell Law School to serve as a professor of trial advocacy and trained a new cadre of trial lawyers.

In 1979, Gould published "The Witness Who Spoke With God and Other Tales From The Courthouse" (Viking, 1979), a book of a collection of his stories which had previously appeared in the New York Law Journal. In 1984, Gould represented former Israeli defense minister Ariel Sharon in his libel case against Time Magazine. In 1985, Gould's book "A Cast of Hawks" (Copley, 1985). The following year, Gould represented Donald Trump in a challenge to the New York state tax laws.

== Death ==
Gould died on March 22, 1999.
