= Leone Lane =

American actress

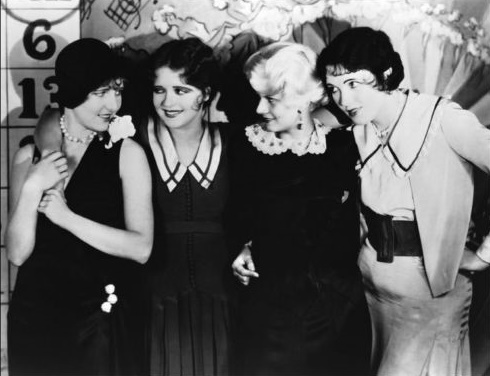
- Jean Arthur, Clara Bow, Jean Harlow and Lane in The Saturday Night Kid (1929)
- Born: Leone Hallie Lane; November 17, 1908; Boston, Massachusetts, U.S.
- Died: March 28, 1993 (aged 84); Los Angeles, California, U.S.
- Occupation: Actress
- Years active: 1928–1935

Leone Hallie Lane, known simply as Leone Lane or Leona Lane, (November 17, 1908 – March 28, 1993) was an American actress of the silent film era and the time of the early sound films.

== Biography ==
Leone Hallie Lane was born on November 17, 1908, in Boston, Massachusetts. She was an actress, known for Wolf Song (1929), Stairs of Sand (1929) and The Case of Lena Smith (1929).

== Death ==
She died on March 28, 1993, in Los Angeles, California of arteriosclerotic cardiovascular disease. Lane is buried at Forest Lawn Memorial Park in Glendale, California.

== Filmography ==
Film
Year	Title	Role	Notes
1928	You Just Know She Dares 'Em		
1929	The Case of Lena Smith	Pepi	(Only a fragment survives)
1929	Wolf Song	Dance-hall girl	
1929	Betrayal		
1929	Stairs of Sand		
1929	The Saturday Night Kid	Pearl	Uncredited
1935	Dante's Inferno	Lucrezia Borgia	Uncredited
