= Stairs of Sand =

1929 film

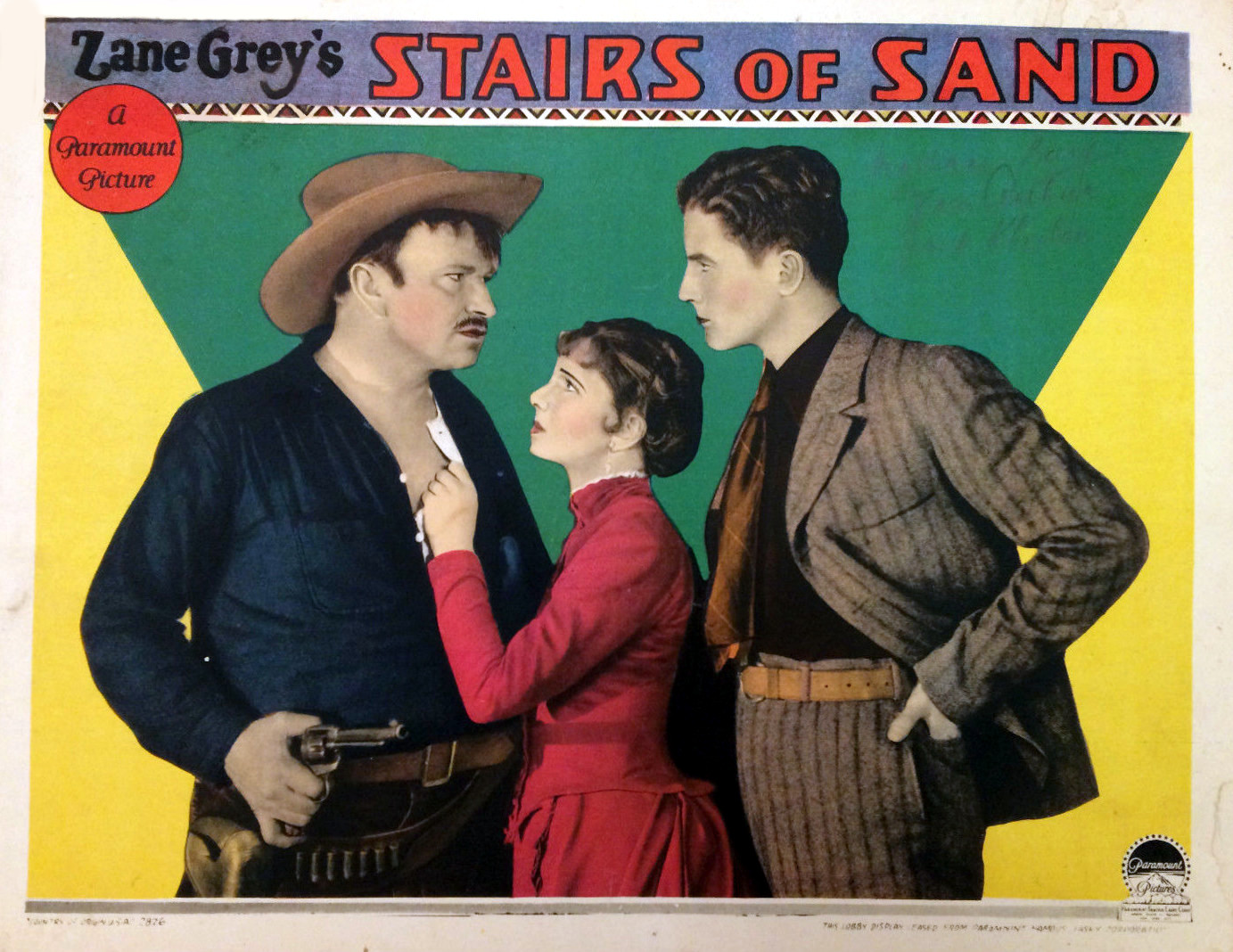
- Lobby card
- Directed by: Otto Brower
- Written by: Agnes Brand Leahy; Sam Mintz; J. Walter Ruben; Ben Grauman Kohn (titles)
- Based on: Stairs of Sand by Zane Grey
- Starring: Wallace Beery; Jean Arthur; Phillips Holmes
- Cinematography: Rex Wimpy
- Edited by: Frances Marsh
- Production company: Paramount Pictures
- Distributed by: Paramount Pictures
- Release date: June 8, 1929
- Running time: 6 reels
- Country: United States
- Languages: Silent; English intertitles

Stairs of Sand is a 1929 American silent Western film starring Wallace Beery, Jean Arthur and Phillips Holmes, made by Paramount Pictures, directed by Otto Brower, and written by Agnes Brand Leahy, Sam Mintz and J. Walter Ruben. It is based on a novel by Zane Grey.

The supporting cast of Stairs of Sand features Fred Kohler and Chester Conklin. Believed to be a lost film, in October 2025, a possible print of the film was discovered in Paramount's silent film holdings.

== Plot ==
Guerd Larey is an outlaw around the town of Lost Lake in the Old West. One day, he robs the stagecoach before it comes into town. His spoils included money that Ruth Hunt was going to use to leave town. She then forced to take a job dancing for patrons in Boss Stone's saloon.

Guerd comes into town and mocks Sheriff Collishaw and Boss Stone's futile attempts to capture the bandit. Boss Stone starts making unwanted sexual advances towards Ruth. To escape him, she steals Guerd's wallet. However, Guerd is able to catch up with her. At that point, she tells him the story about losing her money in the robbery.

Guerd becomes a boarder at Ruth's cabin and begins to fall in love with her. However, she does not share the feelings. One day, Collisaw encounters Adam Wansfell, a young stranger from the Eastern States who has come to town. Happening to be around at the time, Guerd tell the sheriff that Adam is his nephew. Over time, Ruth falls in love with Adam, and they plan to leave town

One day, Guerd returns to Ruth's cabin, having been wounded in an attempted robbery attempt. To protect Guerd, Adam confesses as the outlaw and the sheriff arrests him. Adam is convicted and facing hanging. Realizing that he owes a debt to Adam and Ruth, Guerd provides the sheriff proof of his own guilt and Ruth frees Adam in time to prevent his hanging.

== Cast ==
Wallace Beery as Guerd Lacey

- Wallace Beery as Guerd Lacey
- Jean Arthur as Ruth Hunt
- Phillips Holmes as Adam Wansfell (credited as Phillips R. Holmes)
- Fred Kohler as Boss Stone
- Chester Conklin as Tim
- Guy Oliver as Sheriff Collishaw
- Lillian Worth as Babe
- Frank Rice as Stage Driver
- C.L. Sherwood as Waiter (credited as Clarence L. Sherwood)
- Leone Lane
