= The Temple of Venus (film) =

1923 film directed by Henry Otto

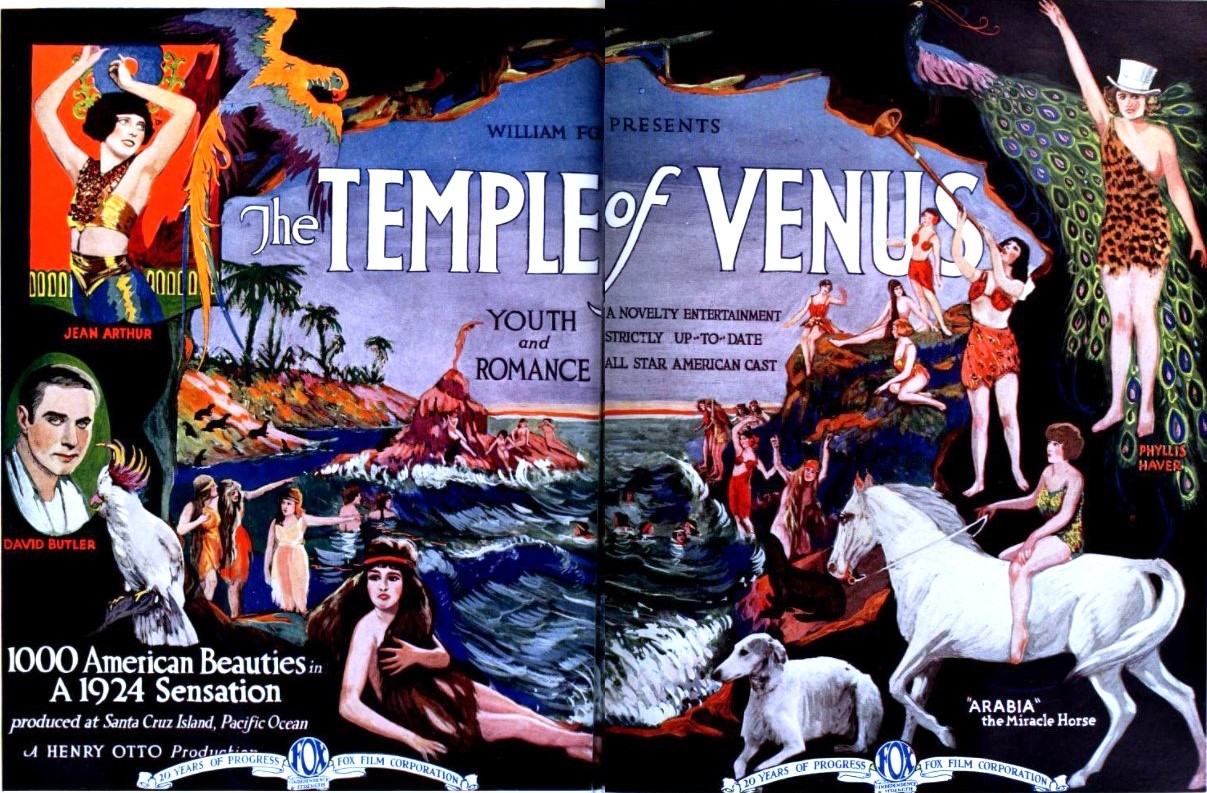
- Advertisement
- Directed by: Henry Otto
- Written by: Catherine Carr
- Story by: Catherine Carr
- Produced by: William Fox
- Starring: William Walling; Mary Philbin
- Cinematography: Joseph H. August
- Distributed by: Fox Film Corporation
- Release date: November 11, 1923
- Running time: 70 minutes
- Country: United States
- Language: Silent (English intertitles)

The Temple of Venus is a 1923 American silent fantasy romance film directed by Henry Otto. It stars William Walling, Mary Philbin, and Mickey McBan. It was produced by William Fox and released by his Fox Film Corporation.

== Plot ==
The fantasy has a modern theme and mythological sequences involving shots of beaches with flimsy gowned dancers and imaginative caverns where dwell Venus, Neptune, Jupiter and the rest of the gods. There is also some views of wild life such as seals and tropical birds.

== Cast ==
- William Walling as Dennis Dean
- Mary Philbin as Moira
- Mickey McBan as Mickey
- Alice Day as Peggy
- David Butler as Nat Harper
- William Boyd as Stanley Dale
- Phyllis Haver as Constance Lane
- Léon Bary as Phil Greyson
- Celeste Lee as Venus
- Senorita Consuella as Thetis
- Robert Klein as Neptune
- Marilyn Boyd as Juno
- Frank Keller as Jupiter
- Lorraine Eason as Echo
- Helen Vigil as Diana

== Production ==
On location filming was conducted at Santa Cruz Island, California. Jean Arthur was initially cast as the lead, but was replaced by the more experienced Mary Philbin after a few days of rehearsal.

== Preservation ==
With no prints of The Temple of Venus located in any film archive, it is a lost film.

== See also ==
- 1937 Fox vault fire
