= I Love You (1918 film) =

1918 film

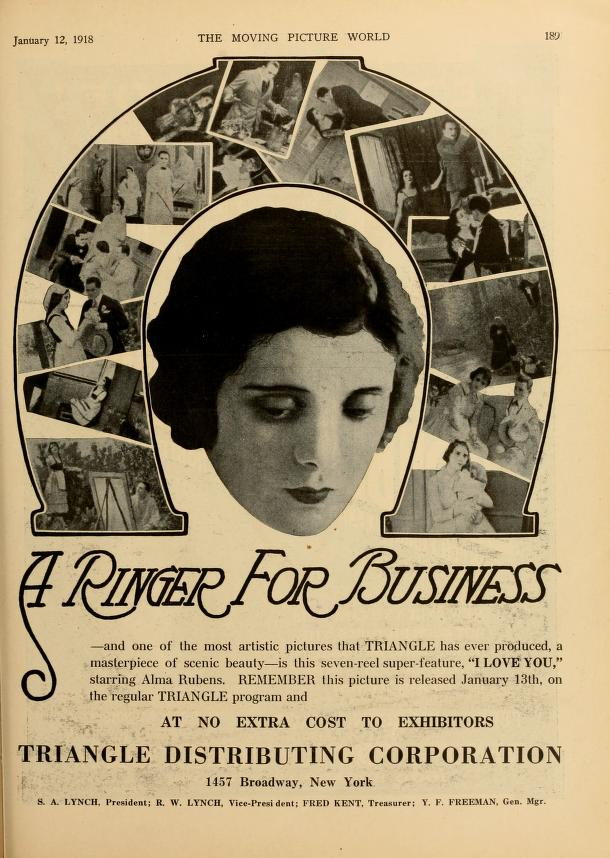
- poster for I Love You
- Directed by: Walter Edwards
- Written by: Catherine Carr
- Produced by: Triangle Studios
- Starring: Alma Rubens
- Cinematography: Gus Peterson
- Distributed by: Triangle Film Corporation
- Release date: January 13, 1918
- Running time: 7 reels
- Country: USA
- Language: Silent...English intertitles

I Love You is a lost 1918 silent film drama directed by Walter Edwards and starring Alma Rubens. The film was produced and distributed by Triangle Film Corporation.

== Cast ==
- Alma Rubens – Felice
- John Lince – Ravello
- Francis McDonald – Jules Mardon
- Wheeler Oakman – Armand de Gautier
- Frederick Vroom – Prince del Chinay
- Lillian Langdon – Princess del Chinay
- Peaches Jackson – Boy
