= The Wall Street Whiz =

1925 film

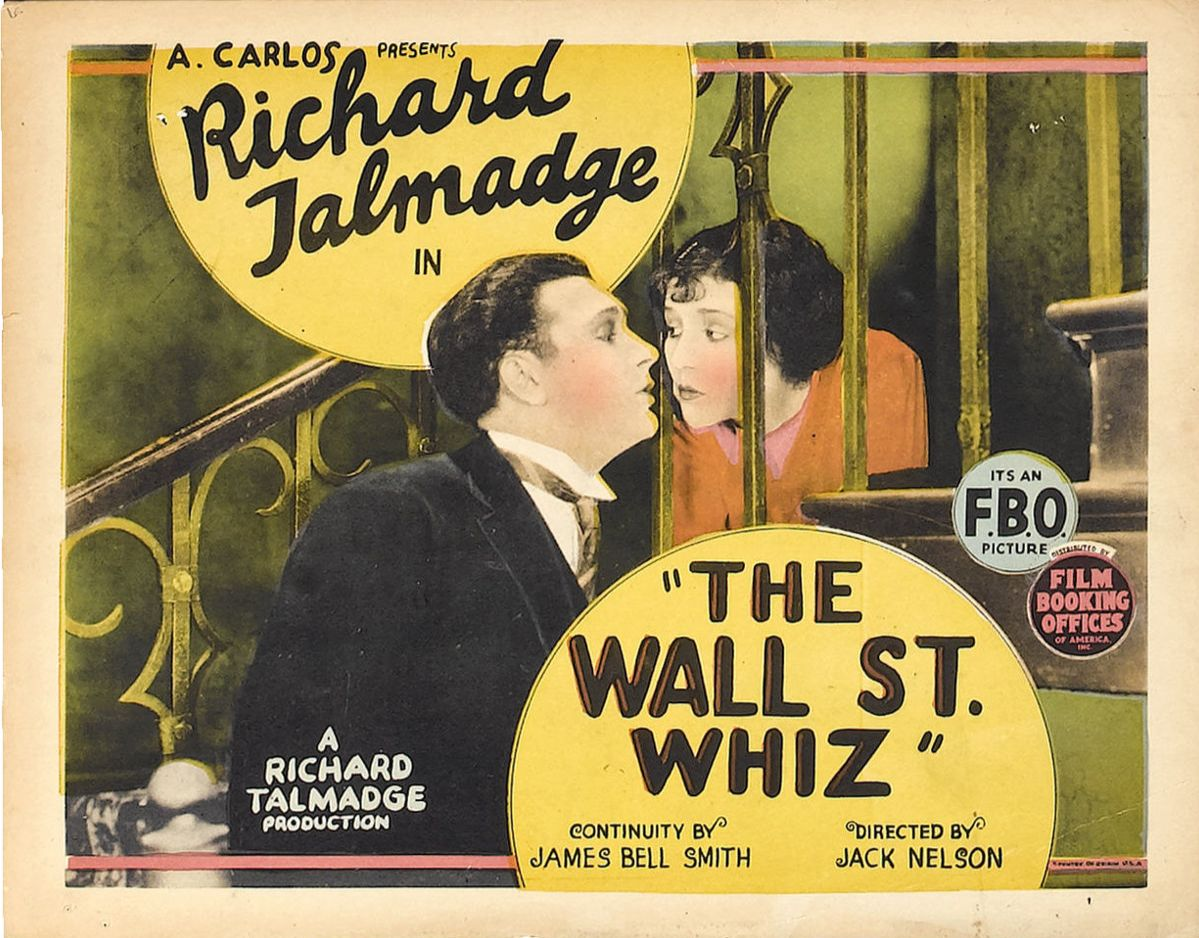
- Lobby card
- Directed by: Jack Nelson
- Written by: James Bell Smith
- Starring: Richard Talmadge; Marceline Day; Lillian Langdon
- Cinematography: William Marshall
- Production companies: Carlos Productions; Truart Film Corporation
- Distributed by: Film Booking Offices of America
- Release date: September 29, 1925
- Running time: 60 minutes
- Country: United States
- Languages: Silent; English intertitles

The Wall Street Whiz, also known under the title The New Butler, is a 1925 American silent action film directed by Jack Nelson and starring Richard Talmadge, Marceline Day, and Lillian Langdon. The film was billed as, "A rip-roaring comedy action drama of Wall Street chuck full of thrilling and interesting situations from beginning to end."

== Plot ==
As described in a review in a film magazine, Richard Butler (Talmadge) is a snappy young society man who under cover operates in the stock market, being in reality the mysterious "Wall Street Whiz." In a café he has an encounter with crooks, the place is raided, and he seeks refuge in an automobile containing Mrs. McCooey (Langdon), a newly rich woman, and her daughter Peggy (Day). When he introduces himself as a Butler, the same job is offered him and he accepts. Eventually he saves the young woman's father (Mason) from being ruined by a financial shark and wins the affections of the young woman, but not until after he has had a strenuous time to keep his true identity secret and a few more encounters with crooks, yeggs, etc.

== Cast ==
- Richard Talmadge as Richard Butler
- Marceline Day as Peggy McCooey
- Lillian Langdon as Mrs. McCooey
- Carl Miller as Clayton
- Billie Bennett as Aunty Jones
- Dan Mason as Mr. McCooey

== Preservation ==
A print is held by Lobster Films, Paris.

== Bibliography ==
- Darby, William. Masters of Lens and Light: A Checklist of Major Cinematographers and Their Feature Films. Scarecrow Press, 1991.
