= Catherine Carr (screenwriter) =

American screenwriter

- Born: Catherine Davis Woodridge; January 1, 1880; Austin, Texas, USA
- Died: January 18, 1941; Los Angeles, California, USA
- Occupation: Screenwriter

Catherine Carr (January 1, 1880 – January 18, 1941) was a silent film era screenwriter with at least 28 films to her credit.

== Biography ==
Catherine, daughter of Absalom and Ida Woodridge, was born in Austin, Texas. She was educated in Washington, D.C., where she met her husband, John Gillis Carr, and began her career as a writer of short stories. Her husband died soon after she gave birth to their two sons.

She began her career writing scenarios before rising to the rank of head of the scenario department at Kinetophone. She wrote a number of films for Vitagraph over the course of her years in the industry.

== Filmography ==
- The Temple of Venus (1923)
- Nobody's Kid (1921)
- The Forgotten Woman (1921)
- The Corsican Brothers (1920)
- Toton (1919)
- The Game's Up (1919)
- Prudence on Broadway (1919)
- The Usurper (UK title Her Buckskin Knight) (1919)
- Shifting Sands (1918)
- The Atom (1918)
- The Ghost Flower (1918)
- High Tide (1918)
- I Love You (1918)
- Irish Eyes (1918)
- The Lonely Woman (1918)
- The Painted Lily (1918)
- The Secret Code (1918)
- Station Content (1918)
- A Soul in Trust (1918)
- The Regenerates (1917)
- A Huntress of Men (1916)
- Temptation and the Man (1916)
- The Narrow Path (1916)
- The Melting Pot (1915)
- The Whirl of Life (1915)
- The Coming Power (1914)
- The Spirit of the Poppy (1914)
- The Span of Life (1914)
