= The Saturday Night Kid =

1929 film

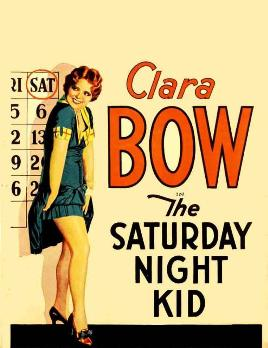
- Directed by: A. Edward Sutherland
- Written by: Ethel Doherty (story); Lloyd Corrigan; Edward E. Paramore, Jr. Joseph L. Mankiewicz (titles)
- Based on: Love 'Em and Leave 'Em; 1926 play by George Abbott; John V. A. Weaver
- Starring: Clara Bow; Jean Arthur; James Hall
- Edited by: Jane Loring
- Music by: John Leipold (uncredited)
- Distributed by: Paramount Pictures
- Release date: October 25, 1929
- Running time: 63 minutes
- Country: United States
- Language: English

The Saturday Night Kid is a 1929 American pre-Code romantic comedy film about two sisters and the man they both want. It stars Clara Bow, Jean Arthur, James Hall, and in her first credited speaking role, Jean Harlow. The film was based on the 1926 play Love 'Em and Leave 'Em by George Abbott and John V. A. Weaver.

== Plot ==
The Saturday Night Kid (1929)

In May 1929, two sisters – Mayme and Janie – share an apartment in New York City. In the daytime, they work as salesgirls at the Ginsberg's department store, at which Mayme is named to be the star of an upcoming pageant about the "Rise of Ginsberg's" written and directed by supervisor Miss Streete. The latter is unhappy with Mayme who is always late for work and often goofing off. Janie is named treasurer of the ticket money for the pageant, which will be donated to orphans. Mayme and Bill, who is a floorwalker at the store, are sweethearts, but when Bill treats a pretty female customer especially nicely, Mayme is jealous and acts up causing the customer to leave and ruining Bill's sale. Bill and Mayme have words, and Mayme breaks up with him.

Mayme's other problem is Janie's selfish and reckless behavior, such as stealing Mayme's clothes, acting sick so Mayme will do her work for her, and ultimately manipulating Bill into asking Janie to a dance, although Bill prefers Mayme over Janie. Janie has gambled away the pageant money with a dishonest neighbor who has cheated Janie; she goes to Mayme for help. Ever the trusting and helpful sister, Mayme tells her to go ahead to the pageant and she will take care of everything. Mayme goes to the crooked neighbor who took Janie's pageant money and gets the money back.

Janie, in the meantime, goes to the pageant and nervously confesses the money is gone, but allows Miss Streeter to believe that Mayme is the one who stole and gambled the money away. Bill overhears this and sells his radio so he can cover the lost money. When Mayme shows up with the money, Bill tries to give her his money. She is horrified that Bill thinks she has stolen and gambled away the money. Ms. Streeter vows to have Mayme prosecuted and fired. Back at the apartment, Mayme and Janie, who is trying to leave with a suitcase, have words. Bill overhears Janie confess that she is the one who stole the money. Feeling like a fool he pursues Mayme and begs her to forgive him and marry him.

== Cast ==
- Clara Bow as Mayme
- Jean Arthur as Janie
- James Hall as William 'Bill' Taylor
- Edna May Oliver as Miss Streeter
- Hyman Meyer as Ginsberg
- Charles Sellon as Lem Woodruff
- Ethel Wales as Lily Woodruff
- Jean Harlow as Hazel
- Leone Lane as Pearl

== Preservation ==
The film was preserved by the UCLA Film & Television Archive with funding by Clara Bow biographer David Stenn.

== See also ==
- List of early sound feature films (1926–1929)
