= Lillian Langdon =

American actress (1860–1943)

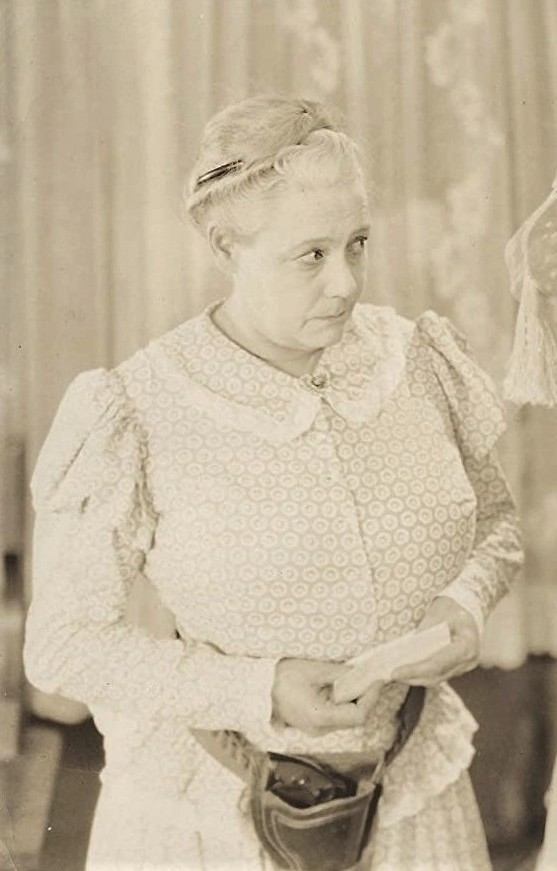
- Langdon in Going Some (1920)
- Born: November 25, 1860; Newark, New Jersey, U.S.
- Died: February 8, 1943 (aged 82); Santa Monica, California, U.S.
- Other names: Lillie H. Bolles
- Occupation: Actress
- Years active: 1912–1928
- Family: Zebulon Pike (Ancestor)

Lillian Langdon (November 25, 1860 – February 8, 1943) was an American film actress of the silent era. She appeared in more than 80 films between 1912 and 1928.

Born in Newark, New Jersey, Langdon was a descendant of Zebulon Pike, discoverer of Pike's Peak, and Jasper Crane, founder of Newark. She acted on stage before she began her career in films. In private life, she was known as Lillie H. Bolles.

She died at her home in Santa Monica, California, aged 82.

== Selected filmography ==
- A Girl of Yesterday (1915) – Mrs. A. H. Monroe
- Kindling (1915) – Mrs. Jane Burke-Smith
- The Wharf Rat (1916)
- Intolerance (1916) – Mary, mother of Jesus
- Diane of the Follies (1916) – Marcia Christy
- The Americano (1917) – Senora de Castille
- Jim Bludso (1917)
- Might and the Man (1917) – Mrs. Sloan
- Indiscreet Corinne (1917)
- Because of a Woman (1917)
- I Love You (1918)
- Limousine Life (1918)
- Society for Sale (1918) – Lady Mary
- The Last Rebel (1918)
- Everywoman's Husband (1918) – Mrs. Rhodes
- False Ambition (1918) – Mrs. Van Dixon
- Shifting Sands (1918) – Mrs. Stanford
- Daddy-Long-Legs (1919) – Mrs. Pendleton
- Prudence on Broadway (1919)
- When a Man Loves (1919)
- The Millionaire Pirate (1919)
- His Majesty, the American (1919) – Princess Marguerite
- A Regular Fellow (1919) – Mrs. Christy
- The Triflers (1920)
- Going Some (1920)
- The Great Accident (1920)
- The Hope (1920)
- Oh, Lady, Lady (1920) – Mrs. Farringdon
- The Triflers (1920)
- The Mother Heart (1921) – Mrs. Lincoln
- The Swamp (1921) – Mrs. Biddie
- What's a Wife Worth? (1921) – Mrs. Penfield
- Kissed (1922)
- The Strangers' Banquet (1922)
- Lights of the Desert (1922)
- Fools of Fortune (1922)
- The Glorious Fool (1922)
- Nobody's Bride (1923)
- Going Up (1923)
- The Prisoner (1923) – Mrs. Garrison
- The Wanters (1923) – Mrs. Worthington
- White Tiger (1923)
- Cobra (1925)
- The Thoroughbred (1925)
- After Business Hours (1925)
- The Wall Street Whiz (1925)
- Joanna (1925) – Mrs. Roxanna Adams
- The Blonde Saint (1926)
- The Millionaire Policeman (1926)
- Fifth Avenue (1926)
- The Cheer Leader (1928)
