= The Triflers (1920 film) =

1920 US film directed by Christy Cabanne

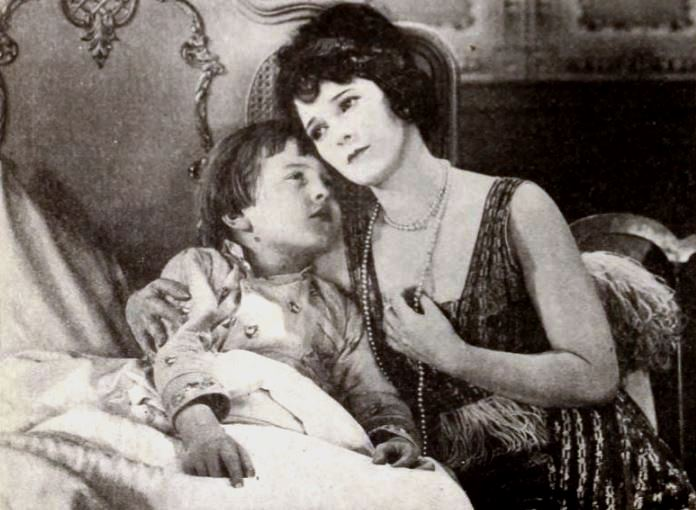
- Edith Roberts and Benny Alexander
- Directed by: Christy Cabanne
- Screenplay by: Hal Hoadley
- Story by: Joseph Franklin Poland
- Produced by: Carl Laemmle
- Starring: Edith Roberts; David Butler; Forrest Stanley
- Cinematography: John Leezer
- Production company: Universal Film Mfg Co.
- Release date: January 12, 1920 (US)
- Running time: 6 reels
- Country: United States
- Language: English

The Triflers is a 1920 American drama film directed by Christy Cabanne and starring Edith Roberts, David Butler, and Forrest Stanley. It was released on January 12, 1920.

== Cast ==
- Edith Roberts as Janet Randall
- David Butler as Cassidy
- Forrest Stanley as Monte Moreville
- Benny Alexander as Rupert Holbrook
- Katherine Kirkham as Mrs. Holbrook
- Arthur Shirley as Mr. Holbrook
- Arthur Hoyt as Charles Lewiston
- Lillian Langdon as Janet's mother
- Frederick Vroom as Janet's father
- Nell Craig as Mrs. Whitaker
