= The Regenerates =

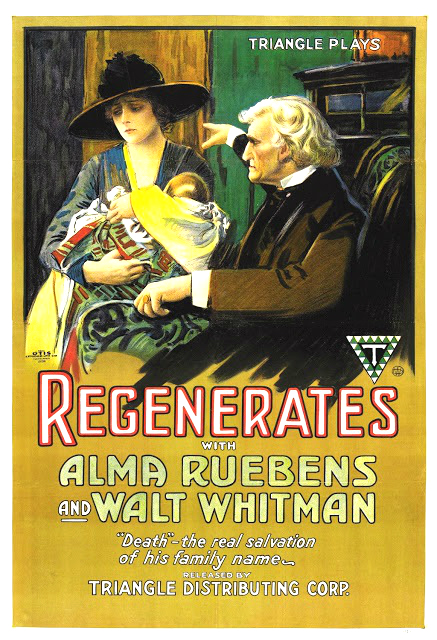
- lobby poster
- Directed by: E. Mason Hopper; Albert L. Werker
- Written by: Catherine Carr
- Produced by: Triangle Film Corporation
- Cinematography: Charles Stumar
- Distributed by: Triangle Film Corporation
- Release date: November 25, 1917
- Running time: 5 reels
- Country: USA
- Language: Silent..English intertitles

The Regenerates is a surviving 1917 silent film drama directed by E. Mason Hopper and starring Alma Rubens. It was produced and distributed by the Triangle Film Corporation.

== Cast ==
- Alma Rubens - Catherine Ten Eyck
- Walt Whitman - Mynderse Van Dyun
- Darrell Foss - Pell Van Dyun
- John Lince - Owen Duffy
- Allan Sears - Paul La Farge
- Louis Durnham - William Slade
- William Brady - James Forbes
- Pauline Starke - Nora Duffy

== Preservation status ==
- The film is preserved in the George Eastman House collection and the Library of Congress collection.
