= Betrayal (1929 film) =

1929 film directed by Lewis Milestone

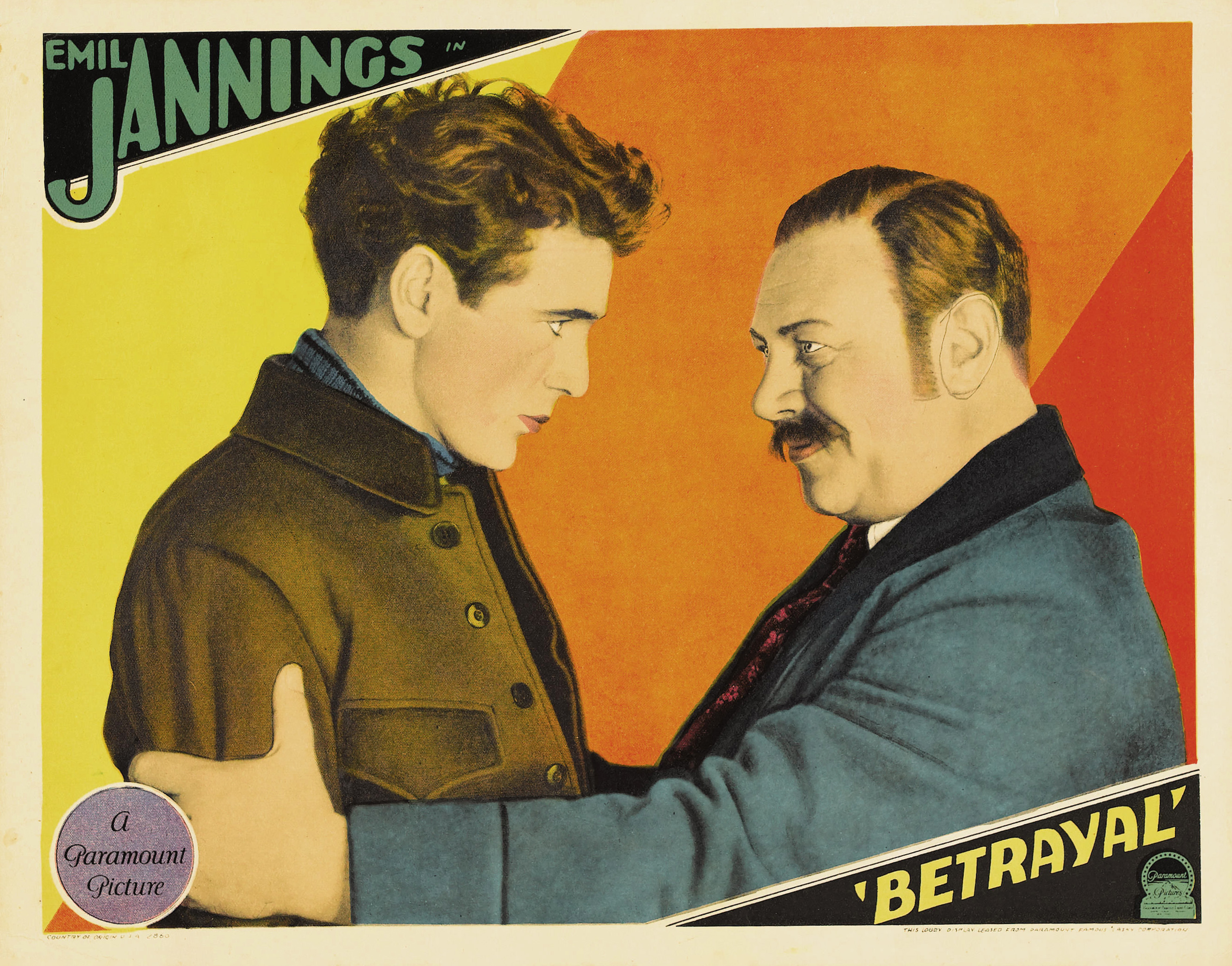
- Lobby card
- Directed by: Lewis Milestone
- Written by: Hanns Kräly; Julian Johnson (titles)
- Story by: Victor Schertzinger; Nicholas Soussanin
- Produced by: Lewis Milestone; David O. Selznick
- Starring: Emil Jannings; Esther Ralston; Gary Cooper
- Cinematography: Henry W. Gerrard
- Edited by: Del Andrews
- Music by: Louis De Francesco; J.S. Zamecnik
- Production company: Famous Players–Lasky
- Distributed by: Paramount Pictures
- Release dates: April 28, 1929 (NYC); May 11, 1929 (USA)
- Running time: 80 minutes 8 reels, 6,614 ft
- Country: United States
- Languages: Sound (Synchronized) (English intertitles)

Betrayal is a 1929 American Synchronized sound drama film produced for Famous Players–Lasky and released by Paramount Pictures. While the film has no audible dialog, it was released with a synchronized musical score with sound effects using both the sound-on-disc and sound-on-film process. The film is the last film without audible dialogue that was directed by Lewis Milestone, the last non-speaking role performance by Gary Cooper, the last non-speaking performance by Germany's Emil Jannings, and the only onscreen pairing of Cooper and Jannings. It is considered a lost film.

== Plot ==
Swiss peasant girl Vroni is having a secret summer romance with Viennese artist Andre Frey. When Andre later returns to Switzerland, he learns that Vroni has been forced to marry wealthy burgomeister Poldi Moser. Explaining Andre's appearance, Vroni introduces him as a young man who has just lost his sweetheart, and in sympathy, Poldi invites Andre to be a guest in his house.

Several times over the next few years Andre visits, during which time Poldi and Vroni have two children. Andre is overwrought by his repressed feelings toward Vroni, and after seven years, begs her to run off with him. She refuses, but agrees to one last tryst. While speeding down a dangerous run on a toboggan together, Vroni is killed and Andre fatally injured. Poldi learns the truth of the relationship while attending Vroni's funeral, and swears vengeance but discovers that Andre has died from the severity of his injuries.

== Cast ==
- Emil Jannings as Poldi Moser
- Esther Ralston as Vroni
- Gary Cooper as Andre Frey
- Douglas Haig as Peter
- Jada Weller as Hans
- Bodil Rosing as Andre's Mother
- Ann Brody
- Paul Guertzman
- Leone Lane

== Music ==
The film features a theme song entitled "Under The Weather" which was written by J.S. Zamecnik (music and lyrics). The musical score was prepared by J. S. Zamecnik and interpreted by the Paramount orchestra under the direction of Louis de Francesco. Max Terr supervised the entire recording.

== Production ==
Filmed at locations near Lake Tahoe, the film was intended to be a "part-talkie" with incorporated talking sequences, but because of Jannings's heavy German accent and the poor recording of Ralston's voice, it was released as a synchronized film with only music and sound effects.

== See also ==
- List of early sound feature films (1926–1929)
