= Prudence on Broadway =

1919 film

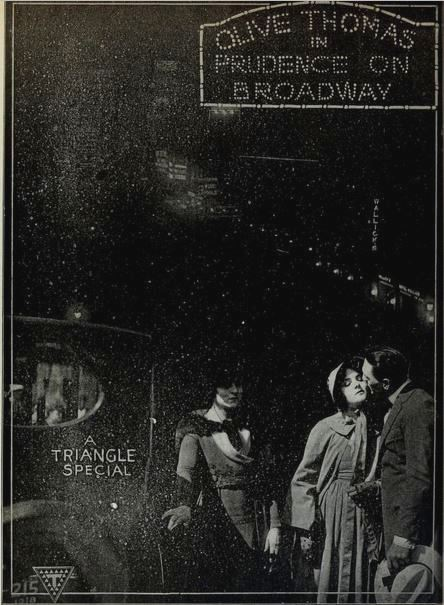
- Directed by: Frank Borzage
- Written by: Catherine Carr
- Produced by: Triangle Studios
- Starring: Olive Thomas
- Cinematography: Pliny Horne
- Distributed by: Triangle Film Corporation
- Release date: July 6, 1919
- Running time: 5 reels
- Country: United States
- Language: Silent (English intertitles)

Prudence on Broadway is a lost 1919 American silent comedy film directed by Frank Borzage and starring Olive Thomas. It was produced and distributed by the Triangle Film Corporation.

== Cast ==
- Olive Thomas as Prudence
- Francis McDonald as Grayson Mills
- Harvey Clark as John Melbourne
- J. P. Wild as John Ogilvie
- Alberta Lee as Mrs. Ogilvie
- Lillian West as Mrs. Allen Wentworth
- Edward Peil Sr. as Mr. Wentworth
- Mary Warren as Kitty
- Lillian Langdon as Mrs. Melbourne
- Claire McDowell as Miss Grayson
