= Jean Arthur =

American actress (1900–1991)

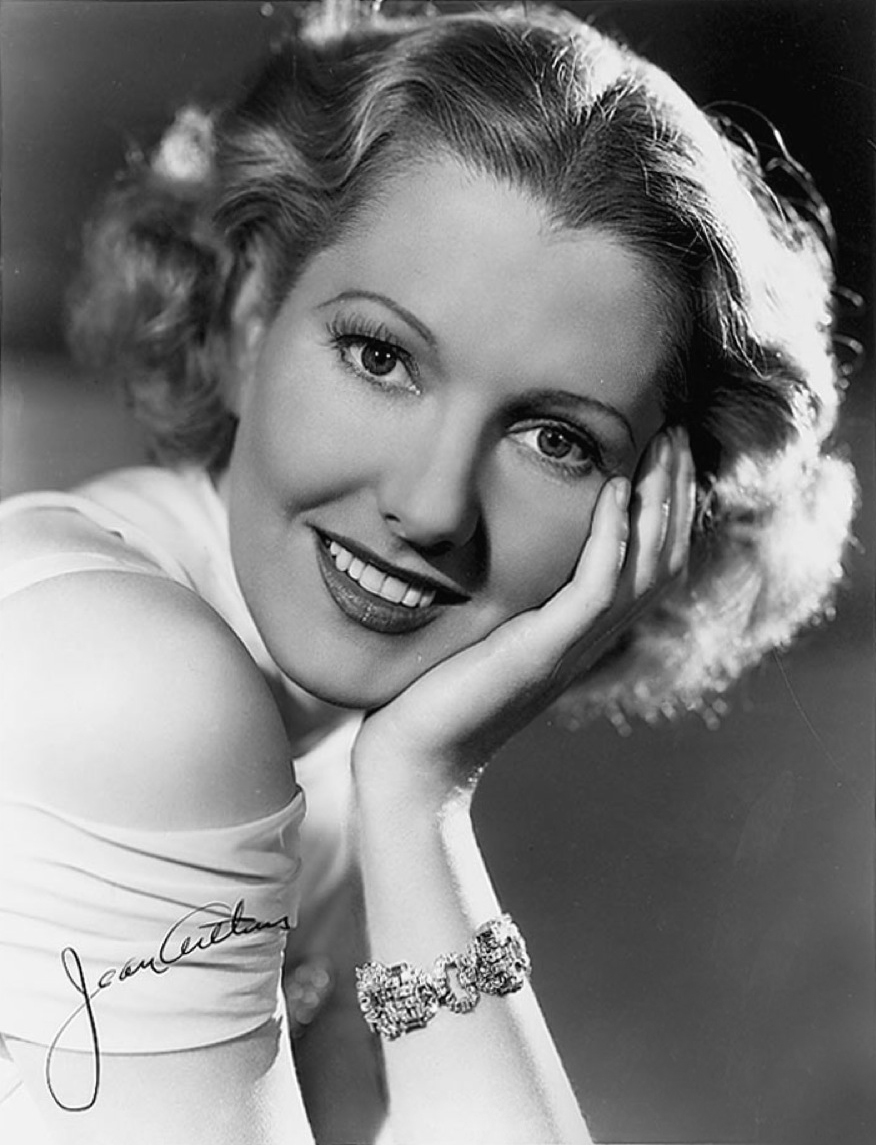
- Arthur in 1937
- Born: Gladys Georgianna Greene; October 17, 1900; Plattsburgh, New York, U.S.
- Died: June 19, 1991 (aged 90); Carmel-by-the-Sea, California, U.S.
- Occupation: Actress
- Years active: 1923–1975
- Known for: Shane; Mr. Smith Goes to Washington; The More the Merrier; You Can't Take It with You; Mr. Deeds Goes to Town
- Political party: Democratic
- Spouses: Julian Anker (m. 1928; annul. 1928) Frank Ross, Jr. (m. 1932; div. 1949)

Jean Arthur (born Gladys Georgianna Greene; October 17, 1900 – June 19, 1991) was an American film and theater actress whose career began in silent films in the early 1920s and lasted until the early 1950s.

Arthur had feature roles in three Frank Capra films: Mr. Deeds Goes to Town (1936) with Gary Cooper, You Can't Take It with You (1938) co-starring James Stewart, and Mr. Smith Goes to Washington (1939), also starring Stewart. These three films all championed the "everyday heroine", personified by Arthur. She also co-starred with Cary Grant in the adventure-drama Only Angels Have Wings (1939) and in the comedy-drama The Talk of the Town (1942). She starred as the lead in the acclaimed and highly successful comedy films The Devil and Miss Jones (1941) and A Foreign Affair (1948), starring alongside Marlene Dietrich in the latter. Arthur was nominated for an Academy Award for Best Actress in 1944 for her performance in The More the Merrier (1943), a comedy which also starred Joel McCrea.

James Harvey wrote in his history of the romantic comedy: "No one was more closely identified with the screwball comedy than Jean Arthur. So much was she part of it, so much was her star personality defined by it, that the screwball style itself seems almost unimaginable without her." She has been called "the quintessential comedic leading lady". Her last film performance was non-comedic, playing the homesteader's wife in George Stevens's Shane in 1953.

Like Greta Garbo, Arthur was well known in Hollywood for her aversion to publicity; she was very guarded about her privacy and rarely signed autographs or granted interviews. LIFE observed in an article in its 11 March 1940 issue, "Next to Garbo, Jean Arthur is Hollywood's reigning mystery woman." As well as recoiling from interviews, after a certain age, she avoided photographers and refused to become a part of any kind of publicity.

Jean Arthur was whimsical without being silly, unique without being nutty, a theatrical personality who was an untheatrical person. She was a delight to work with and to know.

— Edward G. Robinson, in his autobiography, All My Yesterdays,

== Early life ==
Arthur was born Gladys Georgianna Greene in Plattsburgh, New York, to parents Johanna Augusta Nelson and Hubert Sidney Greene. Gladys's maternal grandparents immigrated from Norway to the American West after the Civil War. Her paternal ancestors immigrated from England to Rhode Island in the second half of the 17th century. During the 1790s, Nathaniel Greene helped found the town of St. Albans, Vermont, where his great-grandson, Hubert Greene, was born.

Arthur had three older brothers.

The product of a nomadic childhood, Arthur lived at times in Saranac Lake, New York; Jacksonville, Florida, and Schenectady, New York. The family lived on and off in Westbrook, Maine, from 1908 to 1915, while Arthur's father worked at Lamson Studios in Portland. Relocating in 1915 to New York City, the family settled in the Washington Heights neighborhood of upper Manhattan.

Arthur dropped out of high school in her junior year due to a "change in family circumstances".

== Career ==
=== Silent film ===
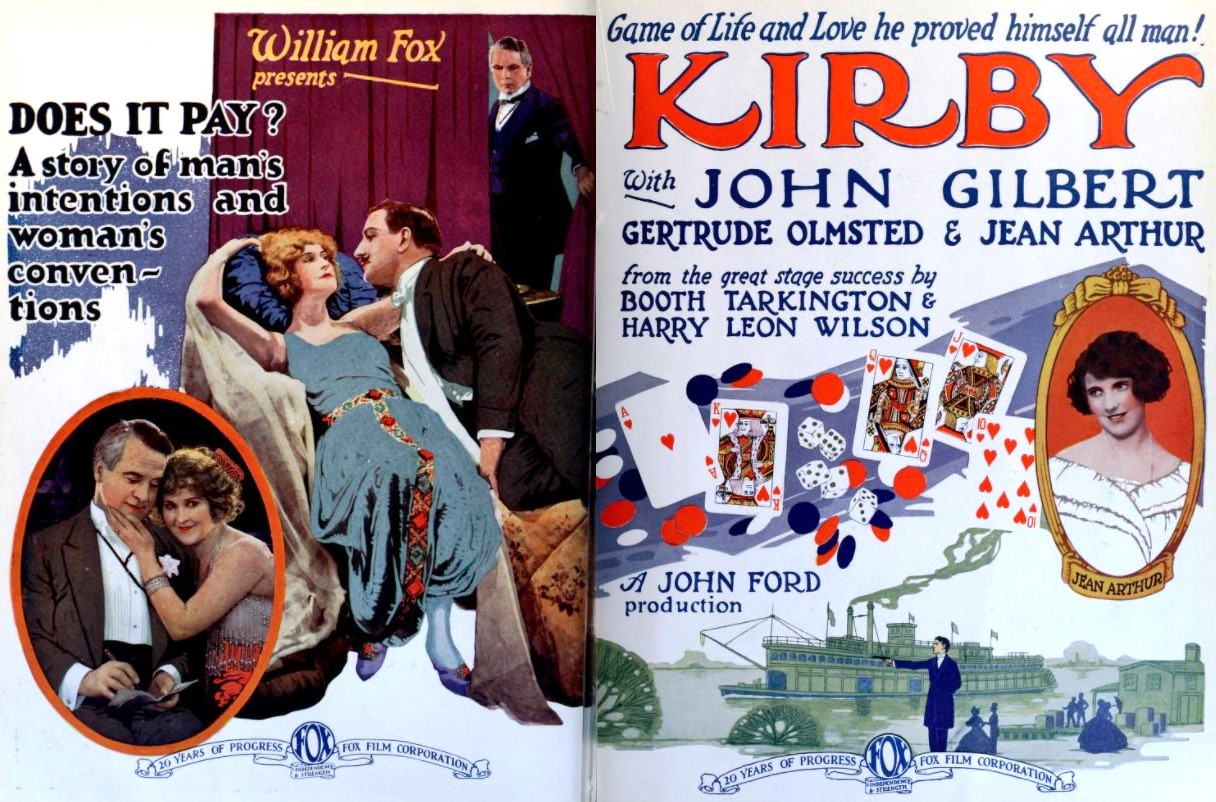
Cameo Kirby advertisement from the July 8, 1923 Film Daily

Discovered by Fox Film Studios while she was doing commercial modeling in New York City in the early 1920s, the newly named Jean Arthur landed a one-year contract and debuted in the silent film Cameo Kirby (1923), directed by John Ford. She reputedly took her stage name from two of her greatest heroes, Joan of Arc (Jeanne d'Arc) and King Arthur. The studio was at the time looking for new American sweethearts with sufficient sex appeal to interest the Jazz Age audiences. Arthur was remodeled as such a personality, a flapper.

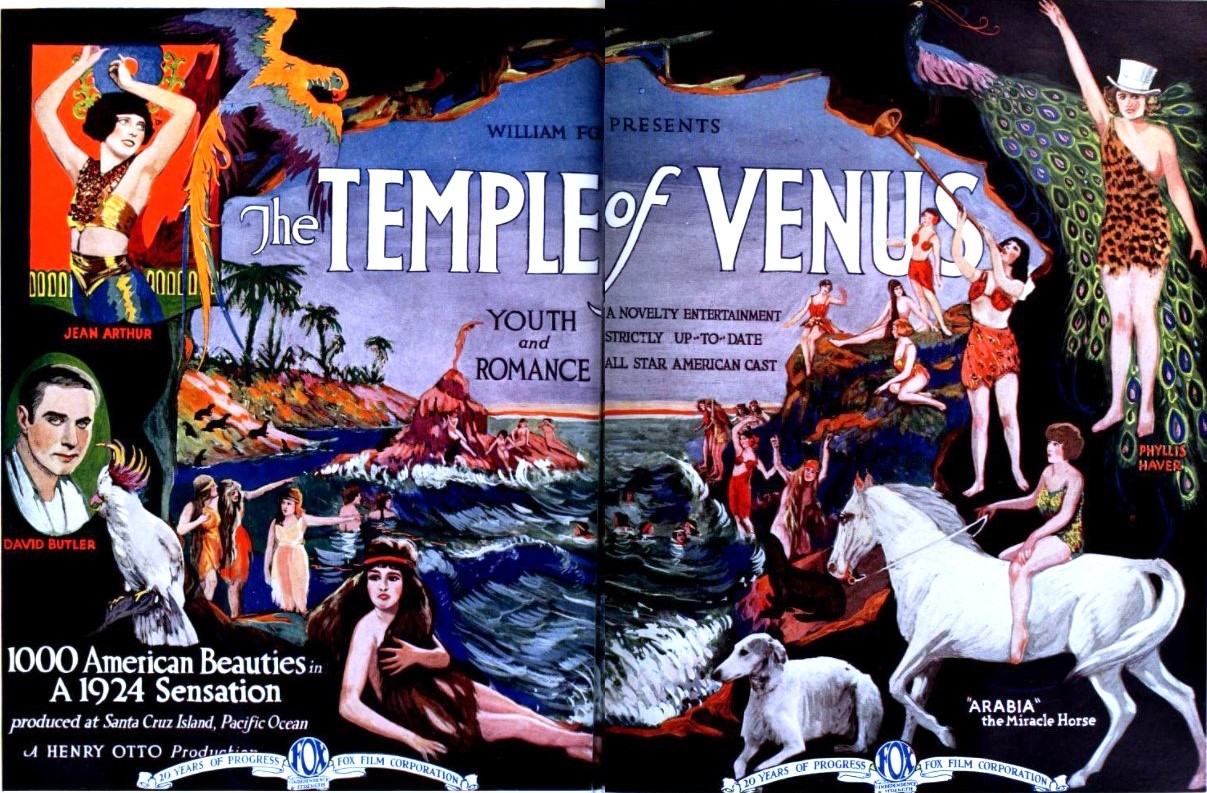
The Temple of Venus advertisement from the July 8, 1923 Film Daily

Following the small role in Cameo Kirby, she received her first female lead role in The Temple of Venus (1923), a plotless tale about a group of dancing nymphs. Dissatisfied with her lack of acting talent, the film's director, Henry Otto, replaced Arthur with actress Mary Philbin during the third day of shooting. Arthur agreed with the director: "There wasn't a spark from within. I was acting like a mechanical doll personality. I thought I was disgraced for life."

Arthur was planning on leaving the California film industry for good, but reluctantly stayed due to her contract, and appeared in comedy shorts, instead. Despite lacking the required talent, Arthur liked acting, which she perceived as an "outlet". To acquire some fame, she registered herself in the Los Angeles city directory as a photo player operator, as well as appearing in a promotional film for a new Encino nightclub, but to no avail.

It would have been better business if I cried in front of the producers. It isn't a bad idea to get angry and chew up the scenery. I've had to learn to be a different person since I've been out here. Anybody that sticks it out in Hollywood for four years is bound to change in self-defense... Oh, I'm hard-boiled now. I don't expect anything. But it took me a long time to get over hoping, and believing, people's promises. That's the worst of this business, everyone is such a good promisor.

— Arthur commenting on her unsuccessful film career in 1928.

Change came when one day she showed up at the lot of Action Pictures, which produced B Westerns, and impressed its owner, Lester F. Scott, Jr., with her presence. He decided to take a chance on a complete unknown, and she was cast in over 20 Westerns in a two-year period. Only receiving $25 a picture, Arthur suffered from difficult working conditions: "The films were generally shot on location, often in the desert near Los Angeles, under a scorching sun that caused throats to parch and make-up to run. Running water was nowhere to be found, and even outhouses were a luxury not always present. The extras on these films were often real cowboys, tough men who were used to roughing it and who had little use for those who were not." The films were moderately successful in second-rate Midwestern theaters, though Arthur received no official attention. Aside from appearing in films for Action Pictures between 1924 and 1926, she worked in some independent Westerns, including The Drug Store Cowboy (1925), and Westerns for Poverty Row, as well as having an uncredited bit part in Buster Keaton's Seven Chances (1925) as the receptionist.

In 1927, Arthur attracted more attention when she appeared opposite Mae Busch and Charles Delaney as a gold-digging chorus girl in Husband Hunters. Subsequently, she was romanced by actor Monty Banks in Horse Shoes (1927), both a commercial and critical success. She was cast on Banks's insistence, and received a salary of $700. Next, director Richard Wallace ignored Fox's wishes to cast a more experienced actress by assigning Arthur to the female lead in The Poor Nut (1927), a college comedy, which gave her wide exposure to audiences. A reviewer for Variety did not spare the actress in his review:

With everyone in Hollywood bragging about the tremendous overflow of charming young women all battering upon the directorial doors leading to an appearance in pictures, it seems strange that from all these should have been selected two flat specimens such as Jean Arthur and Jane Winton. Neither of the girls has screen presence. Even under the kindliest treatment from the camera, they are far from attractive and in one or two side shots almost impossible.

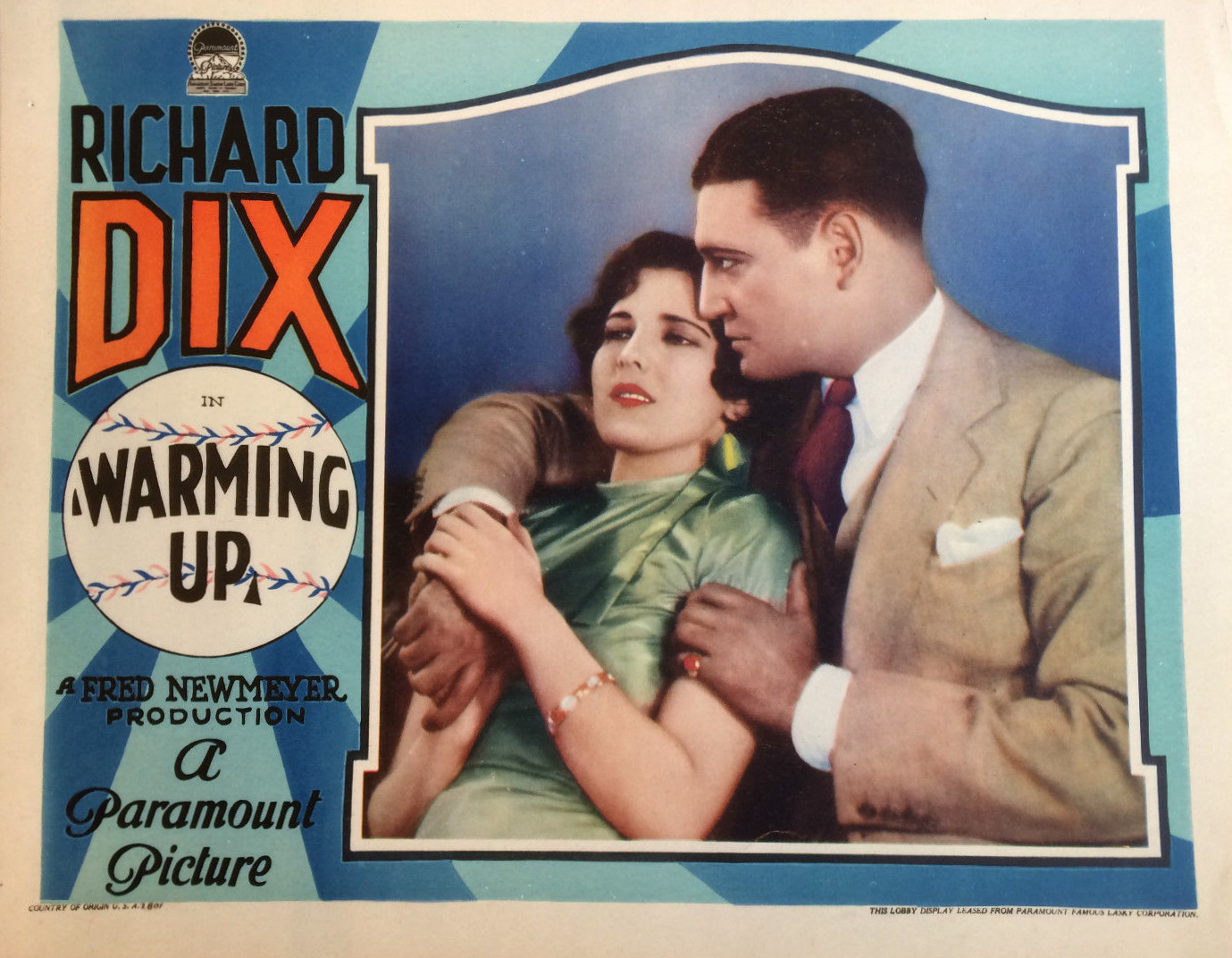
Lobby card featuring Jean Arthur and Richard Dix in Warming Up (1928)

Fed up with the direction that her career was taking, Arthur expressed her desire for a big break in an interview at the time. She was skeptical when signed to a small role in Warming Up (1928), a film produced for a big studio, Famous Players–Lasky, and featuring major star Richard Dix. Promoted as the studio's first sound film, it received wide media attention, and Arthur earned praise for her portrayal of a baseball club owner's daughter. Variety opined, "Dix and Arthur are splendid in spite of the wretched material", while Screenland wrote that Arthur "is one of the most charming young kissees who ever officiated in a Dix film. Jean is winsome; she neither looks nor acts like the regular movie heroine. She's a nice girl – but she has her moments." The success of Warming Up resulted in Arthur being signed to a three-year contract with the studio, soon to be known as Paramount Pictures, at $150 a week.

=== Transition to sound film ===
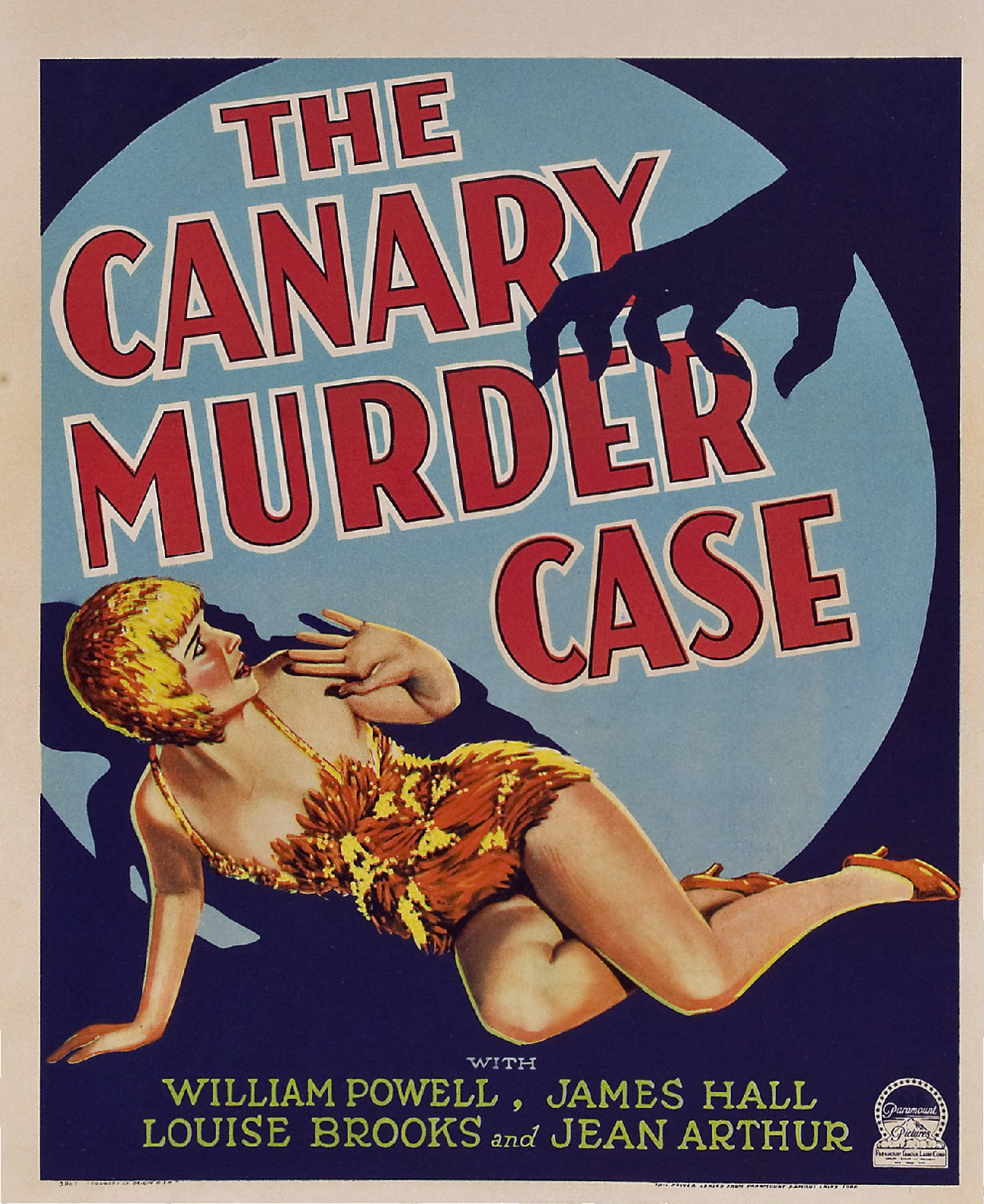
Window poster for The Canary Murder Case (1929)

With the rise of the talkies in the late 1920s, Arthur was among the many silent-screen actors of Paramount Pictures initially unwilling to adapt to sound films. Upon realizing that the craze for sound films was not a phase, she met with sound coach Roy Pomeroy. Her distinctive, throaty voice – in addition to some stage training on Broadway in the early 1930s – eventually helped make her a star in the talkies, but it initially prevented directors from casting her in films. In her early talkies, this "throaty" voice is still missing, and whether it had not yet emerged or whether she hid it remains unclear. Her all-talking film debut was The Canary Murder Case (1929), in which she co-starred opposite William Powell and Louise Brooks. Arthur impressed only a few with the film, and later claimed that at the time she was a "very poor actress ... awfully anxious to improve, but ... inexperienced so far as genuine training was concerned."

In the early years of talking pictures, Paramount was known for contracting Broadway actors with experienced vocals and impressive background references. Arthur was not among these actors, and she struggled for recognition in the film industry. Her personal involvement with rising Paramount executive David O. Selznick – despite his relationship with Irene Mayer Selznick – proved substantial; she was put on the map and became selected as one of the WAMPAS Baby Stars in 1929. Following a silent B Western called Stairs of Sand (1929), she received some positive notices when she played the female lead in the lavish production of The Mysterious Dr. Fu Manchu (1929). Arthur was given more publicity assignments, which she carried out, though she immensely disliked posing for photographers and giving interviews.

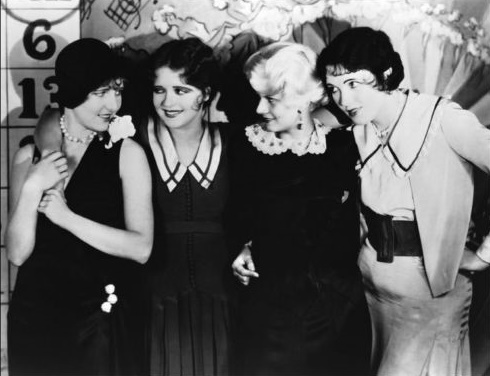
Promotional photo of Jean Arthur, Clara Bow, Jean Harlow, and Leone Lane for The Saturday Night Kid (1929)

Through Selznick, Arthur received her "best role to date" opposite famous sex symbol Clara Bow in the early sound film The Saturday Night Kid (1929). Of the two female leads, Arthur was thought to have "the better part", and director Edward Sutherland claimed, "Arthur was so good that we had to cut and cut to keep her from stealing the picture" from Bow. While some argued that Bow resented Arthur for having the "better part," Bow encouraged Arthur to make the most of the production. Arthur later praised her working experience with Bow: "[Bow] was so generous, no snootiness or anything. She was wonderful to me." The film was a moderate success, and The New York Times wrote that the film would have been "merely commonplace, were it not for Jean Arthur, who plays the catty sister with a great deal of skill."

Following a role in Half way to Heaven (1929) opposite popular actor Charles "Buddy" Rogers (of which Variety opined that her career could be heading somewhere if she acquired more sex appeal), Selznick assigned her to play William Powell's wife in Street of Chance (1930). She did not impress the film's director, John Cromwell, who advised the actress to move back to New York because she would not make it in Hollywood. By 1930, her relationship with Selznick had ended, causing her career at Paramount to slip. Following a string of "lifeless ingenue roles" in mediocre films, she debuted on stage in December 1930 with a supporting role in Pasadena Playhouse's 10-day production run of Spring Song. Back in Hollywood, Arthur saw her career deteriorating, and she dyed her hair blonde in an attempt to boost her image and avoid comparison with the more successful actress Mary Brian. Her effort did not pay off; when her three-year contract at Paramount expired in mid-1931, she was given her release with an announcement from Paramount that the decision was due to financial setbacks caused by the Great Depression.

=== Broadway ===
In late 1931, Arthur returned to New York City, where a Broadway agent cast Arthur in an adaptation of Lysistrata, which opened at the Riviera Theater on January 24, 1932. A few months later, she made her Broadway debut in Foreign Affairs opposite Dorothy Gish and Osgood Perkins. Though the play did not fare well and closed after 23 performances, critics were impressed by her work on stage. She next won the female lead in The Man Who Reclaimed His Head, which opened on September 8, 1932, at the Broadhurst Theatre to mostly mixed notices for Arthur; negative reviews for the play caused the production to be halted quickly. Arthur returned to California for the holidays, and appeared in the RKO film The Past of Mary Holmes (1933), her first film in two years.

Back on Broadway, Arthur continued to appear in small plays that received little attention. Critics, however, continued to praise her in their reviews. In this period, Arthur arguably developed confidence in her acting craft for the first time. On the contrast between films in Hollywood and plays in New York, Arthur commented:

I don't think Hollywood is the place to be yourself. The individual ought to find herself before coming to Hollywood. On the stage I found myself to be in a different world. The individual counted. The director encouraged me and I learned how to be myself.... I learned to face audiences and to forget them. To see the footlights and not to see them; to gauge the reactions of hundreds of people, and yet to throw myself so completely into a role that I was oblivious to their reaction.

The Curtain Rises, which ran from October to December 1933, was Arthur's first Broadway play in which she was the center of attention. With an improved résumé, she returned to Hollywood in late 1933, and turned down several contract offers until she was asked to meet with an executive from Columbia Pictures. Columbia hired her.

=== Columbia Pictures ===
During production of her first Columbia feature, she was offered a long-term contract that promised financial stability for herself and both of her parents. Though hesitant to give up her stage career, Arthur signed the five-year contract on February 14, 1934.

Jean Arthur's first two features for Columbia starred the studio's number-one boxoffice draw, the action star Jack Holt. Holt had a loyal following among fans and exhibitors, and Columbia's president Harry Cohn knew that Arthur would benefit from the exposure, and from working with screen veteran Holt. Whirlpool cast tough-guy Holt as a once-convicted gambler reunited with the daughter he has never seen. Arthur played the daughter with sincerity and sympathy, while Holt displayed a tenderness and compassion never before seen in his two-fisted melodramas. The Hollywood Reporter observed, "Particularly touching and well done are [Holt's] scenes with his daughter. He is given splendid assistance by Jean Arthur, and by the director, Roy William Neill. Without overplaying or mawkish sentimentality, these scenes have a natural, human quality that counts."

Holt and Arthur were teamed a few months later for a follow-up, The Defense Rests (1934); Arthur's character, fresh out of law school, wants to work for a celebrated criminal lawyer, played by Holt, and soon learns the inside story of his success.

Arthur's success in the Holt pictures had a salutary effect on the actress's outlook, according to Picture Play:

Her entire personality has changed, and from a somewhat immature actress of nice but no startling ability she has blossomed into a distinctive artist, and only the future can tell how high she will soar... [She] now receives, from Whirlpool alone, approval that any far more experienced actress might spend years in building up.

In 1935, at age 34, Arthur starred opposite Edward G. Robinson in the gangster farce The Whole Town's Talking, also directed by Ford, and her popularity began to rise. It was the first time Arthur portrayed a hard-boiled working girl with a heart of gold, the type of role with which she would be associated for the rest of her career. She enjoyed the acting experience and working opposite Robinson, who remarked in his biography that it was a "delight to work with and know" Arthur. By the time of the film's release, her hair, naturally brunette throughout the silent-film portion of her career, was bleached blonde and mostly stayed that way. She was known for maneuvering to be photographed and filmed almost exclusively from the left; Arthur felt that her left was her better side, and worked hard to keep it in the fore. Director Frank Capra recalled producer Harry Cohn's description of Jean Arthur's imbalanced profile: "half of it's angel, and the other half horse."

Her next few films, Party Wire (1935), Public Hero No. 1 (1935), and If You Could Only Cook (1935), did not match the success of The Whole Town's Talking, but they all brought the actress positive reviews. In his review for The New York Times, critic Andre Sennwald praised Arthur's performance in Public Hero No. 1, writing that she "is as refreshing a change from the routine it-girl as Joseph Calleia is in his own department." Another critic wrote of her performance in If You Could Only Cook that "[she is] outstanding as she effortlessly slips from charming comedienne to beautiful romantic." With her now apparent rise to fame, Arthur was able to extract several contractual concessions from Harry Cohn, such as script and director approval and the right to make films for other studios.

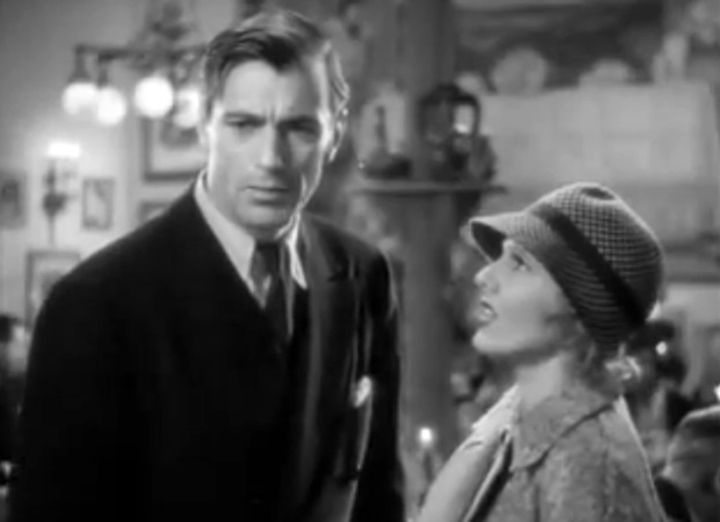
With Gary Cooper in Mr. Deeds Goes to Town (1936)

The turning point in Arthur's career came when she was chosen by Frank Capra to star in Mr. Deeds Goes to Town (1936). Capra had spotted her in a daily rush from the film Whirlpool in 1934 and convinced Cohn to have Columbia Studios sign her for his next film, playing a tough newspaperwoman who falls in love with a country bumpkin millionaire. Though several colleagues later recalled that Arthur was troubled by extreme stage fright during production, Mr. Deeds was critically acclaimed and propelled her to international stardom. In 1936 alone, she earned $119,000, more than the President of the United States and baseball star Lou Gehrig combined.

With fame also came media attention, something Arthur greatly disliked. She did not attend any social gatherings, such as formal parties in Hollywood, and acted difficult when having to work with an interviewer. She was named the American Greta Garbo – who was also known for her reclusive life – and magazine Movie Classic wrote of her in 1937: "With Garbo talking right out loud in interviews, receiving the press and even welcoming an occasional chance to say her say in the public prints, the palm for elusiveness among screen stars now goes to Jean Arthur."

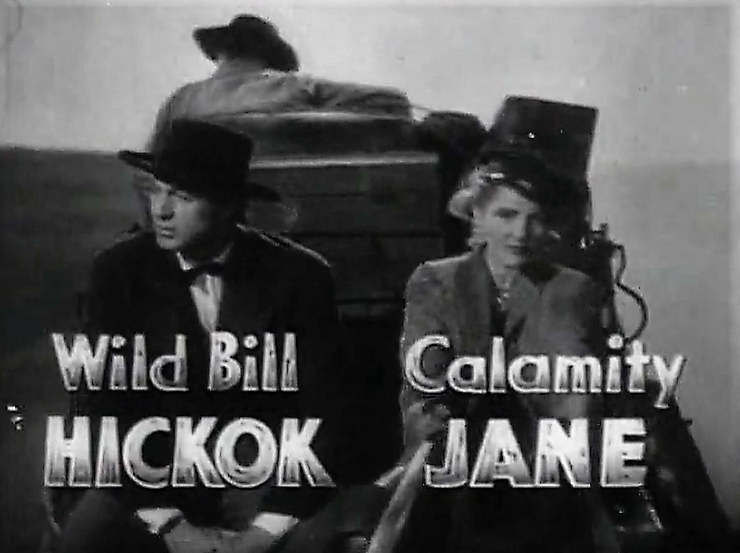
Gary Cooper as Wild Bill Hickok and Jean Arthur as Calamity Jane in The Plainsman (1936)

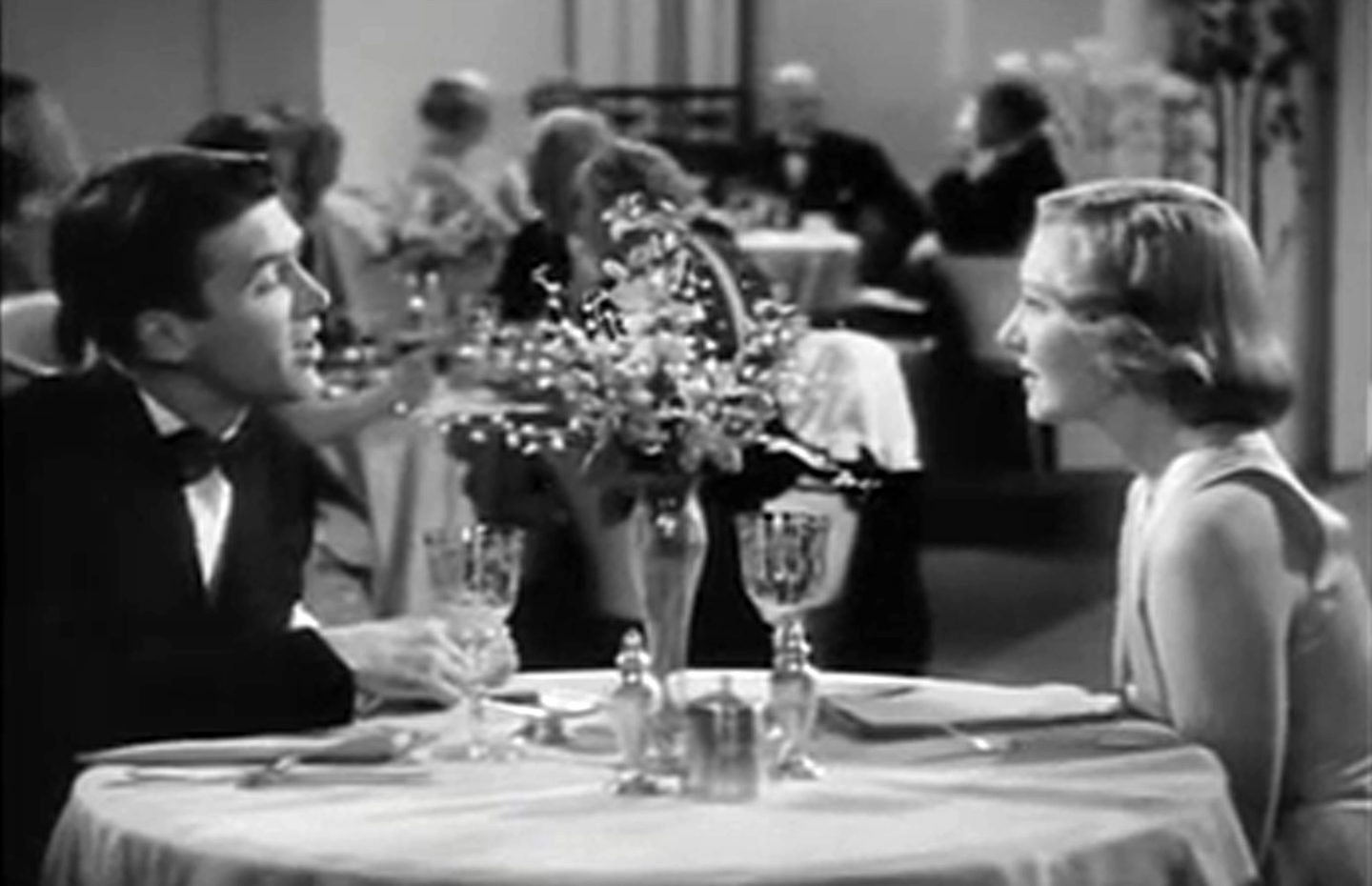
With James Stewart in You Can't Take It with You (1938)

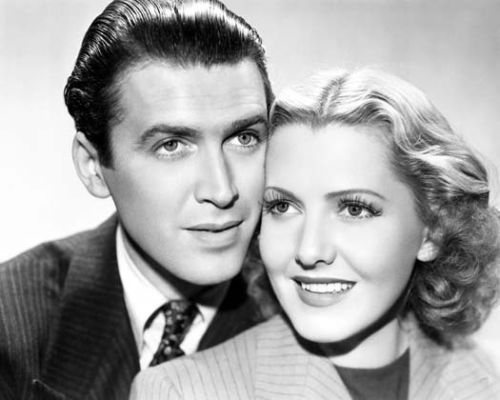
With James Stewart in Mr. Smith Goes to Washington (1939)

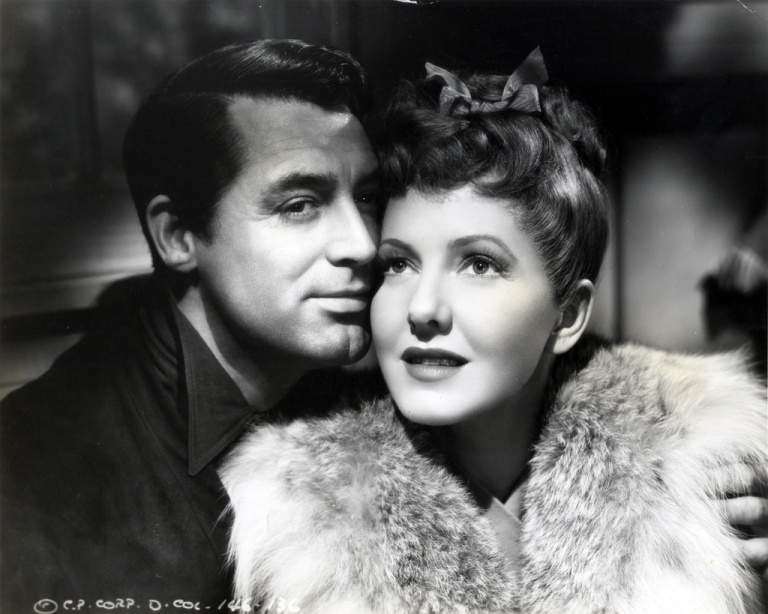
With Cary Grant in The Talk of the Town (1942)

Arthur's next film was The Ex-Mrs. Bradford (1936), on loan to RKO Pictures, in which she starred opposite William Powell on his insistence, and hoped to take a long vacation afterwards. Cohn, however, rushed her into two more productions, Adventure in Manhattan (1936) and More Than a Secretary (1936). Neither film attracted much attention.

Next, again without pause, she was reteamed with Cooper, playing Calamity Jane in Cecil B. DeMille's The Plainsman (1936) on another loan, this time for Paramount Pictures. Arthur, who was De Mille's second choice after Mae West, described Calamity Jane as her favorite role thus far.

In 1937, she appeared as a working girl, her typical role, in Mitchell Leisen's screwball comedy, Easy Living (1937), with Ray Milland. She followed this with another screwball comedy, Capra's You Can't Take It with You (1938), which teamed her with James Stewart. The film won an Academy Award for Best Picture, with Arthur getting top billing.

So strong was her box-office appeal by now that she was one of four finalists for the role of Scarlett O'Hara in Gone with the Wind (1939). The film's producer, David O. Selznick, had briefly romanced Arthur in the late 1920s when they both were with Paramount. Arthur reunited with director Frank Capra and Stewart for Mr. Smith Goes to Washington (1939), with Arthur cast once again as a working woman, this time one who teaches the naïve Mr. Smith the ways of Washington, DC. Arthur was offered a third reunion with Capra and Stewart in It's a Wonderful Life (1946), playing the role of Stewart's wife Mary (which eventually went to Donna Reed), but she refused the role to instead attend Stephens College.

Arthur continued to star in films such as Howard Hawks' Only Angels Have Wings (also 1939), with Cary Grant, The Talk of the Town (1942), directed by George Stevens (with Cary Grant and Ronald Colman, working together for the only time, as Arthur's two leading men), and again for Stevens as a government clerk in The More the Merrier (1943), for which Arthur was nominated for the Academy Award for Best Actress (losing to Jennifer Jones for The Song of Bernadette). As a result of being in dispute with studio boss Harry Cohn, her fee for The Talk of the Town (1942) was only $50,000, while her male co-stars Grant and Colman received upwards of $100,000 each.

Arthur remained Columbia's top star until the mid-1940s, when she left the studio; Rita Hayworth took over as the studio's biggest name. Stevens famously called her "one of the greatest comediennes the screen has ever seen," while Capra credited her as "my favorite actress."

== Later career and retirements ==
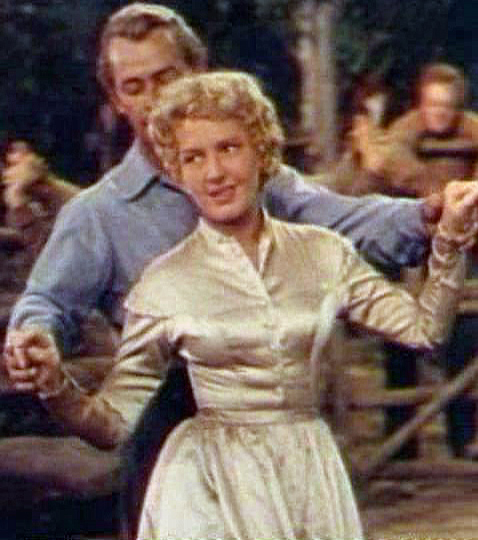
With Alan Ladd in Shane (1953)

Arthur announced her retirement when her contract with Columbia Pictures expired in 1944. She reportedly ran through the studio's streets, shouting "I'm free, I'm free!" For the next several years, she turned down virtually all film offers, the two exceptions being Billy Wilder's A Foreign Affair (1948), in which she played a congresswoman and rival of Marlene Dietrich's, and as a homesteader's wife in Stevens' classic Western Shane (1953), which turned out to be the biggest box-office hit of her career. The latter was her final film, and the only color film in which she appeared.

Arthur's postretirement work in theater was intermittent, somewhat curtailed by her unease and discomfort about working in public. Capra claimed she vomited in her dressing room between scenes, yet emerged each time to perform a flawless take. According to John Oller's biography, Jean Arthur: The Actress Nobody Knew (1997), Arthur developed a kind of stage fright punctuated with bouts of psychosomatic illnesses. A prime example was in 1945, when she was cast in the lead of the Garson Kanin play Born Yesterday. Her nerves and insecurity got the better of her and she left the production before it reached Broadway, opening the door for a then-unknown Judy Holliday to take the part. Nevertheless, Arthur appeared as Peter Pan in the 1950 Broadway musical Peter Pan.

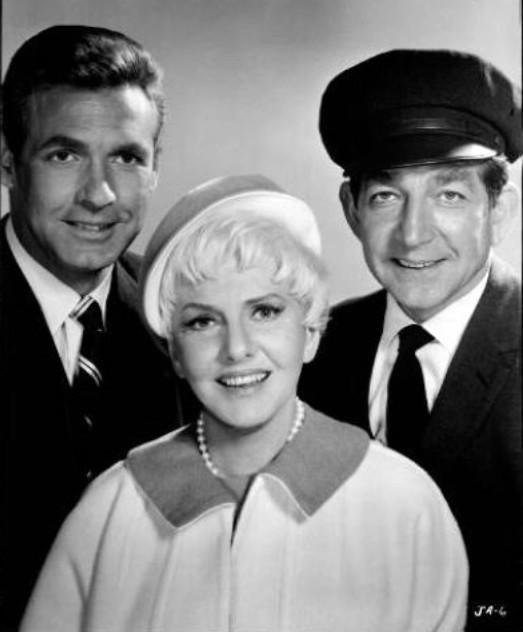
With Ron Harper and Leonard Stone in The Jean Arthur Show (1966)

After Shane and A Foreign Affair, Arthur went into retirement for 11 years.

In 1965, the reclusive Arthur returned to show business to star in an episode of Gunsmoke, as Julie Blane in season 10, episode 24's "Thursday's Child". In 1966, she took on the role of Patricia Marshall, an attorney, on her own television sitcom, The Jean Arthur Show, which was cancelled midseason by CBS after only 12 episodes.

In 1967, Arthur was coaxed back to Broadway to appear as a Midwestern "spinster" who falls in with a group of hippies in the play The Freaking Out of Stephanie Blake. In his book The Season, William Goldman reconstructed the disastrous production, which eventually closed during previews when Arthur refused to go on.

Arthur next decided to teach drama, first at Vassar College and then the North Carolina School of the Arts.

While living in North Carolina, in 1973, Arthur made front-page news by being arrested and jailed for trespassing on a neighbor's property to console a dog she felt was being mistreated. An animal lover her entire life, Arthur said she trusted them more than people. She was convicted, fined $75, and given three years' probation.

After 11 performances of First Monday in October in Cleveland, Ohio, in 1975, Arthur then retired for good, retreating to Driftwood Cottage, her oceanside home on Carmel Point at the southern city limits of Carmel-by-the-Sea, California, steadfastly refusing interviews until her resistance was broken down by the author of a book about Capra. Arthur once famously said that she would rather have her throat slit than give an interview.

== Personal life ==
Arthur's first marriage, to photographer Julian Anker in 1928, was annulled after one day. She married producer Frank Ross, Jr. in 1932. They divorced in 1949.

Arthur lived in Carmel-by-the-Sea, California, for 30 years, and died from heart failure on June 19, 1991, at the age of 90. No funeral service was held. She was cremated, and her remains were scattered off the coast of Point Lobos, California.

=== Driftwood Cottage ===
Driftwood Cottage, in Carmel Point, California, was once the home of Arthur and her mother Johanna Greene. Arthur remodeled the house and created a large outdoor garden, with landscape artist George Hoy, in a Japanese architecture style, including a Japanese bronze dragon gate latch.

== Legacy ==
Upon her death, film reviewer Charles Champlin wrote the following in the Los Angeles Times:

To at least one teenager in a small town (though I'm sure we were a multitude), Jean Arthur suggested strongly that the ideal woman could be – ought to be – judged by her spirit as well as her beauty ... The notion of the woman as a friend and confidante, as well as someone you courted and were nuts about, someone whose true beauty was internal rather than external, became a full-blown possibility as we watched Jean Arthur.

For her contribution to the motion-picture industry, Arthur has a star on the Hollywood Walk of Fame at 6333 Hollywood Blvd.

In 2014, Arthur was inducted into the Hall of Great Western Performers at the National Cowboy & Western Heritage Museum in Oklahoma City.

In January 2026, she was recognized as Turner Classic Movies Star of the Month.

== Radio performances ==
Year	Program	Episode/source
1937	Lux Radio Theatre	Mr. Deeds Goes to Town
1937	Lux Radio Theatre	The Plainsman
1938	Lux Radio Theatre	Seventh Heaven
1939	Lux Radio Theatre	Only Angels Have Wings
1939	Lux Radio Theatre	Pygmalion
1940	Screen Guild Theater	Jezebel
1941	Lux Radio Theatre	Remember the Night
1943	Lux Radio Theatre	The Talk of the Town
1953	Theatre Guild on the Air	The Grand Tour

== See also ==
- List of actors with Academy Award nominations
- Irene Dunne
- List of actors with Hollywood Walk of Fame motion picture stars
