= The Case of Lena Smith =

1929 film

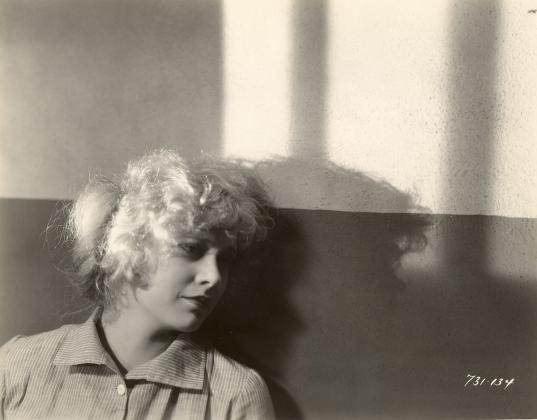
- Directed by: Josef von Sternberg
- Written by: Jules Furthman; Julian Johnson (titles)
- Story by: Samuel Ornitz
- Produced by: Jesse L. Lasky
- Starring: Esther Ralston; James Hall; Gustav von Seyffertitz; Emily Fitzroy
- Cinematography: Harold Rosson
- Edited by: Helen Lewis
- Distributed by: Paramount Pictures
- Release date: January 29, 1929 (United States)
- Running time: 80 minutes
- Country: United States
- Language: Silent (English intertitles)

The Case of Lena Smith is a 1929 American silent drama film directed by Josef von Sternberg, starring Esther Ralston and James Hall, and released by Paramount Pictures.

The Case of Lena Smith is ranked by film critics as among the “lost masterpieces” of the silent era and the Holy Grail for archivists who sift through film repositories. The last remaining prints were destroyed by Paramount Pictures shortly after the end of the Second World War for tax purposes. In 2003, Japanese film historian Komatsu Hiroshi unearthed a four-minute fragment of The Case of Lena Smith in Manchuria, China, reviving interest in the film.

The work was the last of Sternberg's eight silent films and one of three in his career set in the city of his birth and childhood: Vienna. The two other movies are Dishonored (1931) and The King Steps Out (1936). American film-maker Curtis Harrington was among the latter people to view a print from the Paramount vaults. Commenting on the experience in Sight & Sound (February 17, 1949), Harrington wrote:

The Case of Lena Smith may be regarded as von Sternberg’s most successful attempt at combining a story of meaning and purpose with his very original style.

== Plot ==
The following plot summary is derived from the 10-page “Sequence Summary” issued by Paramount's Story Department (October 28, 1928). The narrative is framed between a prologue and an epilogue, both set in a small Hungarian village. The main story occurs in a flashback, presented in sequences A through M (each containing a number of scenes), all of which are set in fin-de-siècle Vienna. The focal character is Lena Smith (the name an Austrian bureaucrat bestowed on her to shorten her Hungarian given name).

Prologue: The tale opens in August 1914 and World War I has been declared. The middle-aged Lena, and her elderly husband Stephan, a prosperous peasant farmer, anxiously take leave of Franz Jr. the son of Lena's first (now deceased) husband. The young man is deploying to fight on the frontlines.

Sequences A-M summary: A flashback takes the viewer 20 years in the past to 1894. The young Lena has just spurned her suitor, Stephan, who has arranged their marriage with the consent of Lena's father. Despite Stephan's declaration of devotion, she departs gaily on foot toward Vienna, accompanied by two other adventurous peasant girls. They all hope to find pleasant work in the big city and escape the dreary hardships of farm labor.

In Vienna, the three country girls stroll through the Prater at night. Each of them pairs off with a soldier, Lena with the cadet officer, Franz Hofrat. She surrenders to his seductions and they begin an affair – which we will discover in time has produced a child. They secretly are married, and Franz reassures her “Don’t worry Lena, I will look after you.”

The scene shifts to Vienna four years hence. Lena performs menial tasks as a house servant, as do many other young woman in the neighborhood. Her master and mistress are Herr and Frau Hofrat, the parents of their only son, Franz. The young officer has arranged employment for Lena in his parents' petty-bourgeois household, who know nothing of their servant's clandestine marriage to their son, nor that they are grandparents a little Franz. Lena and her spouse Franz are estranged and refrain from associating with each other – on the young husband's insistence. The young Hofrat's moral cowardice is compounded by gambling, the debt payments which he extorts from his father. Nor is the prideful officer faithful to Lena: He sleeps with other men's wives.

Lena visits her 3-year-old son Franz at the house of Stephan's sister, who lives in Vienna – secretly, and only after nightfall. The elder Hofrat is alerted to Lena's nocturnal excursions and suspects she may be involved with his son. Herr Hofrat is relieved when he visits his son's apartment, unannounced, and Lena is not there. Nonetheless, Herr Hofrat confines Lena to her room at night, and sternly reminds her that he is the chief of Vienna's Bureau of Morals.

On her day off, Lena – ostensibly an unmarried woman - takes her little boy to the Prater. There she has an unpleasant encounter with the janitor who serves at the Hofrat apartments. Maliciously, the laborer reports the matter to the elder Hofrat, who instantly assumes that the child is illegitimate. He summons Lena and fires her on the spot. As police councilor, he orders the child seized and placed in an orphanage for the poor.

When Lena, distracted, appeals to administrators at the Bureau of Morals to discover the whereabouts of her little Franz, they disclose that she has been deemed an “unfit” mother. To regain custody of her child from the poor house, she must pay a fee of 1,000 crowns.

When Lena informs her husband about the crisis, he lightly dismisses the matter as on one that might bring disgrace to his name. He declines to intervene on the child's behalf.

When Lena returns to the home of Stephan's sister, she discovers that Stephan himself has arrived from the countryside. His sister has told him everything and he is determined to rescue Lena from her plight. Lena demurs, but Stephan presents her with 700 crowns – his life savings – and insists that she demand 300 crowns from her husband, that “uniformed poodle” so as to free the child. Lena approaches her husband to a café and reveals that she possesses 700 crowns and demands he contribute another 300. In her desperation, Lena relinquishes the funds to Franz, who promises to use it to win a fortune at the gambling tables.

When Officer Franz rejoins his fellow officers at the café, he discovers a surly peasant has taken his chair: Stephan. The farmer scurrilously insults the honor of the military man and an altercation ensues. Franz knows his is outmatched when he realizes that the farmer is Lena's true champion. A policeman separates the two rivals.

That evening at home, Franz pens a letter to his family – a self-pitying farewell. Lena arrives to retrieve the money, but her disgraced Franz retreats to his bedroom and takes his own life with a pistol. Lena attends the inquest for her husband's death. The elder Hofrat, intent on casting blame on Lena for her son's suicide, attempts to interrogate her. Lena reacts by submitting her marriage license to the court. The elder Hofrat is faced with the fact that Lena is his daughter-in-law and little Franz his grandchild. He reacts harshly, insisting on adopting the child and denying any visitation rights to Lena. When she threatens to go public with facts of the marriage, the court punishes her outburst with a six-month term in the workhouse.

Lena brutally is dragged into the prison upon her arrival and whipped by the head matron in an attempt tame her. Lena makes a desperate escape over a barbed wire fence, barely eluding the guards. She reaches the asylum where little Franz is held and flees with the boy from Vienna and back to the Hungarian countryside – and freedom.

Epilogue – The story flashes back to 1914 as Franz Jr. bids farewell to his distraught mother Lena. She is devoid of any patriotic fervor. Her intuition tells her that the boy will not survive the war, and that all the suffering she has endured has been in vain.

== Cast ==
- Esther Ralston as Lena Smith
- James Hall as Warrant Officer Franz Hofrat
- Gustav von Seyffertitz as Herr Hofrat
- Emily Fitzroy as Frau Hofrat
- Fred Kohler as Stephan
- Betty Aho as Stephan's sister
- Lawrence Grant as Commissioner
- Alex Woloshin as Janitor
- Ann Brody as Janitor's wife

== Background ==
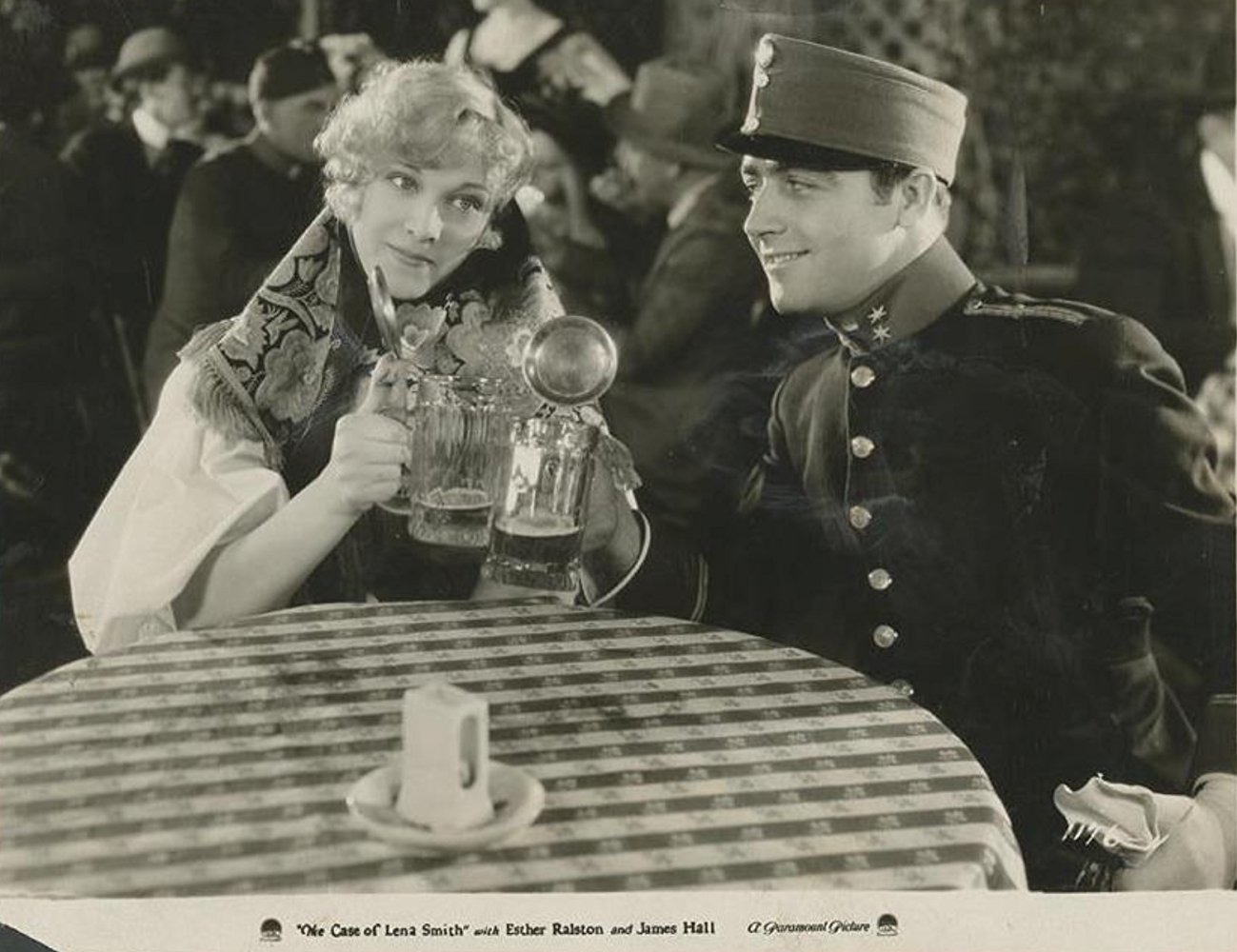
Lena (Esther Ralston) and cadet officer Franz (James Hall) at the Prater.

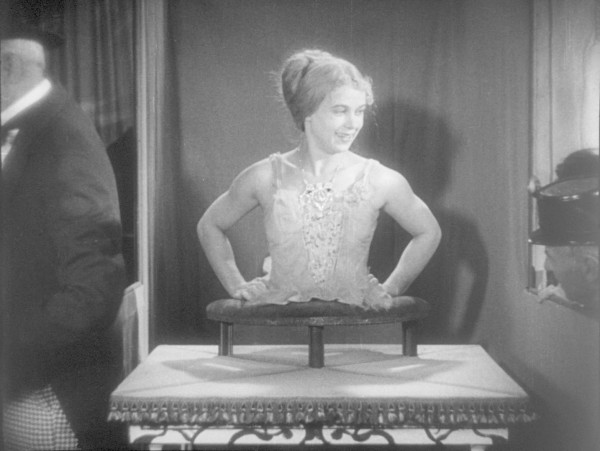
Prater sequence: "Half Lady" exhibit

Elements of the film's narrative and creative character have been reconstructed from archival material from multiple sources, including the Paramount film files.

The main story of the movie unfolds in Vienna of 1894 (the year of von Sternberg's birth) during a period which saw a doubling of the city's population as agricultural workers from the realms of the decaying Austria-Hungary empire - Bohemia, Moravia, Galicia and Hungary – migrated to the urban centers. The ethnically diverse newcomers found employment as industrial workers in factories and domestic servants for the bourgeoisie.

Sternberg presents the full range of social types who inhabited “the ethnic melting pot of the Viennese population” at the turn of the century. The character of Lieutenant Franz Hofrat, Lena's first husband, is based on the novelist Arthur Schnitzler’s protagonist in Leutnant Gustl (1901).

The Prater comprises the Wurstelprater – the theme park, a mingling place for all of Vienna’s social strata at the fin-de-siècle. Film historian Andrew Sarris reports that Sternberg's depiction of the Prater is "one of the most admired sequences in the film" and quotes at length the director's vivid recollection of the Wurstelprater in his memoirs:

Mine was every crevice of the vast amusement park, the like of which never again existed...Hundreds of shooting galleries, Punch and Judy and the inevitable Satan puppet, chalk-faced clowns in the dominoes...leather-faced dummies that groaned when slapped, pirouetting fleas, sword swallowers, tumbling midgets and men on stilts, contortionists, jugglers and acrobats, wild swings with skirts flaring from them...forests of balloons, tattooed athletes, muscle-bulging weight lifters, woman who were sawed in half...grunting knife throwers with screaming targets whose hair flowed down to the hems of their nightgowns, hatchet-throwing Indians and phlegmatic squaws, double-headed calves, members of the fair sex, fat and bearded, with thighs that could pillow and army, magicians who poured jugs of flaming liquid down their throats...and the Chinese mandarin with drooping moustache longer than the tail of a horse revolving on a merry-go-round to the tune of Ion Ivanovici's Donauwellen - and what more could I have asked?

Sternberg was not the only director of the silent era to invoke Vienna's famous Prater. Erich von Stroheim’s Merry-Go-Round (1923) and The Wedding March (1928) “probably contributed to the conception of Lena Smith” and contemporary film critics recognized von Stroheim's influence.

“I was never that good an actress, [although] I did think that in The Case of Lena Smith I did well. Josef von Sternberg was so clear and coherent in his direction. I loved his directing; I practically worshiped him…”— Actor Esther Ralston from her memoir Someday We’ll Laugh (1985).

Sternberg first worked with actress Esther Ralston when he re-shot some scenes on the Famous Players–Lasky film Children of Divorce (1927). Samuel Ornitz submitted a story about a young unwed mother who fights to keep her illegitimate child. The earliest scripts of the film is marked “Brief Synopsis of a Ralston-Mother Story” indicating that Sternberg had the actress in mind from the start.

The framing components (prologue and epilogue) of the film were “the last thing[s] added in the script” by screenwriter Jules Furthman and director Sternberg, and comprised “the heart of the film, ending on a tone of utter bleakness and helplessness in the face of state authority.” Indeed, the final script and contemporary reviews describe a scenario of such tragic proportions as to have "risked the commercial success" of the film.

== Reception ==
=== United States ===
While American film enthusiasts were very impressed with The Case of Lena Smith, the trade papers offered mixed reviews. Variety (January 16, 1929) considered the film's story, theme, acting and production "admirable" but regretted that "its realism is pretty remote from the tastes of most movie-goers" and "the picture hasn’t a spark of light to relieve the shadow." The Los Angeles Times (January 20, 1929) appreciated Sternberg's original style, but complained that "Lena Smith fails to satisfy, for it reaches no rounded-out conclusion." The Film Daily (January 20, 1929) described the film as "a psychological study of a woman’s reactions to the injustices of class and caste in aristocratic and military Vienna before the war." Motion Picture News reported that Sternberg's Lena Smith "missed the mark" as a form of "mass entertainment ... the title misleading. The tale is one of mother love; it is not a murder-trial thriller."

The New York Times’s critic Mordaunt Hall (January 15, 1929) described the films scenario as unnecessarily deterministic, such that the female protagonist’s "destiny is controlled at all times by the author’s pen, irrespective of what happens in everyday life" and chastening Sternberg for failing to present his "child reminisces" with "any suggestion of whimsicality."

Mary Porter Russell, writing for the Washington Post (February 25, 1929) thought the film "strikingly original in its treatment ... Not once did it become stickily sentimental over Lena’s plight or make a deliberate effort to play on the emotions ... An excellent picture, unless you insist on a good time." Lacking "simple themes" and "uncomplicated action", the movie was not a box-office success, and like most silent films distributed during the transition to sound, The Case of Lena Smith "fell by the wayside".

=== Germany ===
German film critic Gero Gandert provided an overview of the lively commentary among cinephiles that met the release of The Case of Lena Smith (German Title: Eine Nacht im Prater – One Night in the Park) when it opened Berlin on January 29, 1930.

Critic and novelist Hans Sahl of the Montag Morgan (February 3, 1930) approvingly called the movie “one of the sharpest, most embittered settling of accounts with the spirit of the dapperly uniformed pre-war Habsburg monarchy.”

Editor Heinz Pol of the Vossische Zeitung (February 3, 1930) praised Sternberg for transforming an otherwise light love story into a tragic tale of a woman's struggle to regain custody of her child. Pol's estimate of Sternberg's talent included praise for “that razor-sharp line between art and non-art.”

Politically conservative critics expressed displeasure with the films depiction of the Viennese social order, particularly the scenes portraying Austrian petty-bourgeois under the Habsburg monarchy. The Deutsche Tageszeitung of January 31, 1930 criticized Sternberg for indulging “in his blind (possibly self-inflicted) hate of pre-war Austria.” The journal Der Montag (February 3, 1930) accused the director of “portraying the inhabitants of Vienna as “cold-hearted...which does not seem to us to be the most prominent Viennese characteristic.”

=== Austria ===
The Vienna censorship board briefly barred The Case of Lena Smith in May 1929 during the initial review due to its "unsuccessful portrayal of milieu" and "unsuitable intertitles in Viennese dialect."” In June 1929 (eight months before reaching Vienna theatres) the film received their imprimatur: "Overall qualification – Passable, average film" and a genre category of "moral drama in 8 acts."

Unlike Berlin reviewers, Viennese commentators did not address any pro- or anti-Austrian perceptions regarding the film. The major factor affecting reception in Austria was related to the shift in public enthusiasm toward sound films that was underway when The Case of Lena Smith – a silent film – opened in Vienna on February 8, 1930. Vienna, with a weaker film culture than the vibrant cinephile associations in Berlin, virtually guaranteed the film "was hardly noticed or reviewed at all."

Sternberg's The Blue Angel, with its innovative use of sound effects and dialogue would open in the city just 10 weeks later.

The multiple titles, and their unwieldy length created a degree of confusion among reviewers and the public as what the film was about: “moral drama”, “American crime thriller” or “tragedy of a single mother.” Lacking “simple themes” and “uncomplicated action”, the movie was not a box-office success and like most silent films distributed during the transition to sound, The Case of Lena Smith “fell by the wayside.”

=== France ===
Paramount Pictures screened The Case of Lena Smith (French title - La Calvaire de Lena X - The Calvary (mental suffering) of Lena X) at its flagship theatre in Paris on May 23, 1930. Within a week all showings were discontinued and replaced with Wolf Song, a Gary Cooper and Lupe Vélez vehicle: “Suburban theatre operators wanted productions suitable to show off their new sound reproduction equipment.” Of Sternberg's The Case of Lena Smith, “the daily papers in France took hardly any notice.”

== Preservation status ==
A surviving fragment from The Case of Lena Smith

This is now considered a lost film. A four-minute fragment was shown at the 2003 Giornate del cinema muto festival in Pordenone, Italy. The sole extant fragment of The Case of Lena Smith has been published on DVD by the Austrian Film Museum.

Assembling 150 original stills and set designs, numerous script and production documents and essays by eminent film historians, the book Josef von Sternberg. The Case of Lena Smith published by the Austrian Film Museuma and SYNEMA tries to reconstruct Sternberg's drama.

== See also ==
- List of incomplete or partially lost films

== Sources ==
- Arens, Katherine (August 2009). Reconstructing a Lost Masterpiece. Department of Germanic Studies, University of Texas at Austin.
- Bowser, Eileen (April 2008). Josef Von Sternberg: the Case of Lena Smith. Journal of Film Preservation. Archived from the original on May 30, 2018 – via Questia.
- Bergstrom, Janet (2007). "The Sternberg Paradox: The Case of Lena Smith". In Horwath, Alexander; Omasta, Michael (eds.). Josef von Sternberg. The Case of Lena Smith. Vienna: SYNEMA - Gesellschaft für Film und Medien. ISBN 978-3-901644-22-1. (Filmmuseum-Synema-Publikationen Vol. 5).
- Eyman, Scott (1997). The Speed of Sound: Hollywood and the Talkie Revolution, 1926-1930. New York: Simon & Schuster. ISBN 0-684-81162-6.
- Gandert, Gero (2007). ""He Too Has the Evil Eye" - On the Reception of Josef von Sternberg and Lena Smith in the Weimar Republic". In Horwath, Alexander; Omasta, Michael (eds.). Josef von Sternberg. The Case of Lena Smith. Vienna: SYNEMA - Gesellschaft für Film und Medien. ISBN 978-3-901644-22-1. (Filmmuseum-Synema-Publikationen Vol. 5).
- Grafl, Franz (2007). "Lena X". In Horwath, Alexander; Omasta, Michael (eds.). Josef von Sternberg. The Case of Lena Smith. Vienna: SYNEMA - Gesellschaft für Film und Medien. ISBN 978-3-901644-22-1. (Filmmuseum-Synema-Publikationen Vol. 5).
- Hiroshi, Kumatsu (2007). "The Case of Lena Smith: A Fragment". In Horwath, Alexander; Omasta, Michael (eds.). Josef von Sternberg. The Case of Lena Smith. Vienna: SYNEMA - Gesellschaft für Film und Medien. ISBN 978-3-901644-22-1. (Filmmuseum-Synema-Publikationen Vol. 5).
- Horwath, Alexander; Omasta, Michael, eds. (2007). Josef von Sternberg. The Case of Lena Smith. Vienna: SYNEMA - Gesellschaft für Film und Medien. ISBN 978-3-901644-22-1. (Filmmuseum-Synema-Publikationen Vol. 5).
- Horwath, Alexander (2007). "Working with Spirits - Trace of Sternberg: A Lost Film About the "City of My Dreams."". In Horwath, Alexander; Omasta, Michael (eds.). Josef von Sternberg. The Case of Lena Smith. Vienna: SYNEMA - Gesellschaft für Film und Medien. ISBN 978-3-901644-22-1. (Filmmuseum-Synema-Publikationen Vol. 5).
- Lunzer, Martina (April 2009). "Vienna's Prater District on Film, or: Looking at the World Again". Senses of Cinema.
