= Wolf Song =

1929 film

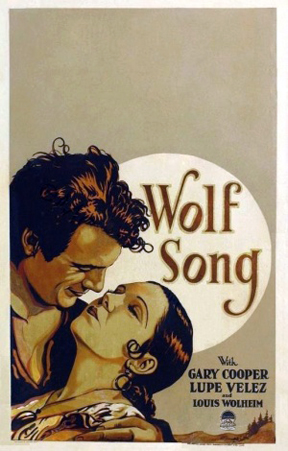
- Theatrical release poster
- Directed by: Victor Fleming
- Written by: Keene Thompson; John Farrow; Julian Johnson (intertitles)
- Story by: Harvey Fergusson
- Produced by: B.P. Fineman; Lucien Hubbard
- Starring: Gary Cooper; Lupe Vélez
- Cinematography: Allen Siegler
- Edited by: Eda Warren
- Music by: Max Bergunker; Gerard Carbonara
- Production company: Paramount Pictures
- Distributed by: Paramount Pictures
- Release date: March 30, 1929
- Running time: 93 minutes
- Country: United States
- Languages: Sound (Part-Talkie); English Intertitles

Wolf Song is a 1929 American sound part-talkie Western romance film directed by Victor Fleming and starring Gary Cooper and Lupe Vélez. While the film has a few sequences with dialog, the majority of the film featured a synchronized musical score with sound effects using both the sound-on-disc and sound-on-film process.

Based on a story by Harvey Fergusson, the film is about a Kentucky man (Cooper) who heads out west in 1840 looking for adventure and meets a group of mountain men who take him into the Rocky Mountains to trap beavers and cats. The man meets a beautiful Mexican woman (Vélez) in Taos who comes from a proud and wealthy family. They fall in love and elope, and he becomes torn between his love for her and his desire for travelin'. The film contains a synchronized score and sound effects, as well as some synchronized singing sequences. This Pre-Code film is notable for showing Gary Cooper almost entirely nude as he shaves and washes in a river.

== Plot ==
Sam Lash is a Kentucky fur trapper with a randy reputation when it comes to women. But when Sam meets tempestuous Mexican damsel Lola Salazar, he falls deeply in love for the first time in his life. Lola's aristocratic father Don Solomon disapproves of the romance, forcing Sam to kidnap the girl and high-tail it to the mountains. After a brief period of marital contentment, Sam gets restless and leaves Lola, preferring the company of his trapper pals Gullion and Rube. But he relents and returns to his bride—making short work of his bitter enemy, Indian leader Black Wolf.

== Cast ==
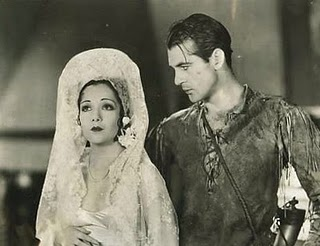
Lupe Velez and Gary Cooper

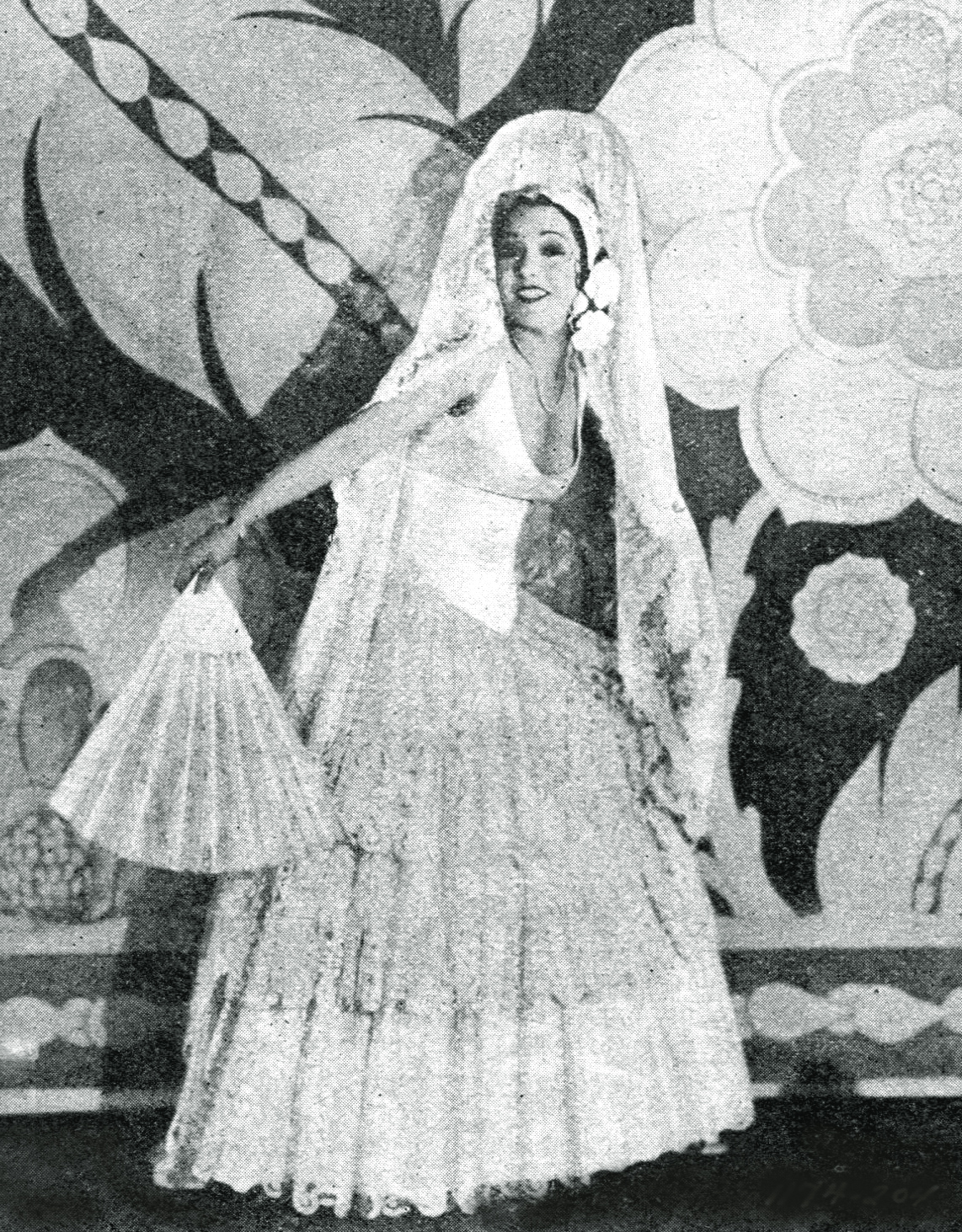
Lupe Velez

- Gary Cooper as Sam Lash
- Lupe Vélez as Lola Salazar
- Louis Wolheim as Gullion
- Constantine Romanoff as Rube Thatcher
- Michael Vavitch as Don Solomon Salazar
- Ann Brody as Duenna
- Russ Columbo as Ambrosio Guiterrez
- Augustina López as Louisa
- George Regas as Black Wolf
- Leone Lane as Dance hall girl
- Guy Oliver (uncredited)

== Production ==
Filming took place on location in the Sierra Nevada mountain range around California in late 1928.

== Music ==
The soundtrack featured the following songs:

- "Mi Amado" (Harry Warren, Sam Lewis, and Joe Young)
- "Yo Te Amo Means I Love You" (Richard A. Whiting and Al Bryan)
- “Dolly Dean” (Arthur Lamb and A. Teres)
- "Love Take My Heart" (Arthur J. Lamb and A. Teres)

== See also ==
- List of early sound feature films (1926–1929)
